= 2012 Guerrero state elections =

2012 Guerrero State Election
← 2011	July 1, 2012	2015 →

81 municipalities and 28 local deputies

The 2012 Guerrero State Election was a collection of popular elections held in the Mexican State of Guerrero on Sunday July 1, 2012. In it the following positions were renewed:

- One municipal president for each of the 81 Municipalities. Elected for a period of three years not re-eligible for the immediate period.
- 28 deputies to the Congress of Guerrero. Elected by relative majority in each of the electoral districts.

== Election results ==
The following table records the number of votes each party and coalition had received during the election. The party or coalition that won in each municipality would have their corresponding cells shaded:

No.	Municipality	Elected municipal president	Parties							Coalition		Votes		
No.	Municipality	Elected municipal president	PAN	PRI	PRD	PT	PVEM	MC	PNA	Compromiso por Guerrero	Guerrero nos Une	Null Votes	Valid Votes	Total votes
1	Acapulco de Juárez	Luis Walton Aburto	28,669						7,100	91,830	147,896	10,309	275,495	285,804
2	Acatepec	Juan Paulino Neri	2,629	2,513	4,167	113		1,952	71			448	11,445	11,893
3	Ahuacuotzingo	Daniel Casarrubias Hernández	337	3,697	3,433	2,876						448	10,343	10,791
4	Ajuchitlán del Progreso	Carmen Higuera Fuentes	338	4,774	5,142		2,758	4,611	62			523	17,685	18,208
5	Alcozauca de Guerrero	Armando Sánchez de Jesús		2,895	2,228			1,297				237	6,420	6,657
6	Alpoyeca	Marco Antonio Garcia Morales	144	1,103			21				1,747	161	3,015	3,176
7	Apaxtla	Efraín Peña Damacio		875	2,151		84	1,766	263			175	5,139	5,314
8	Arcelia	Taurino Vázquez Vázquez	156	7,300	7,031			250				585	14,737	15,322
9	Atenango del Río	Andrés Cantoran González		1,844	1,215	786			60			132	3,905	4,037
10	Atlamajalcingo del Monte	Jorge Luis Espinobarrios Galindo	207	894	470	145		562	43			147	2,321	2,468
11	Atlixtac	Juventino Flores Salgado	2,537		2,150	230		1,193	554	2,797		736	9,461	10,197
12	Atoyac de Álvarez	Ediberto Tabarez Cisneros	484	10,719	7,115	315		4,971	481			1,661	24,085	25,746
13	Ayutla de los Libres	Severo Castro Godinez	5,940	2,856			7,188		227		6,089	2,021	22,300	24,321
14	Azoyú	Luis Justo Bautista	130	3,466	2,930		24	240	120			432	6,910	7,342
15	Buenavista de Cuéllar	Elías Salgado Samano	364		202	2,754		88	85	2,577		268	6,070	6,338
16	Benito Juárez	Nicolás Torreblanca García	167	3,427	4,149		59		186			378	7,988	8,366
17	Coahuayutla de José María Izazaga	Everardo Barron Ríos		2,439	3,662							31	6,101	6,132
18	Cochoapa el Grande	Luciano Moreno López	98	4,117	3,099	82	111	275				426	7,782	8,208
19	Cocula	César Miguel Peñaloza Santana	246	2,546	2,221	105	100		1,338			470	6,556	7,026
20	Copala	Sadot Bello García	1,008						35	2,591	2,572	306	6,206	6,512
21	Copalillo	Bernardo Rosas Linares	138	1,762	2,228	357		1,851	34			308	6,370	6,678
22	Copanatoyac	Manuel Ayala Velázquez	53	3,358	3,297	223			27			478	6,958	7,436
23	Coyuca de Benítez	Ramiro Ávila Morales	7,611	9,353	6,916		208	3,630	997			2,055	28,715	30,770
24	Coyuca de Catalán	Rey Hilario Serrano	995	8,549	9,034	124	65	16	59			1,210	18,842	20,052
25	Cuajinicuilapa	Yrineo Loya Flores	3,099	2,956	3,008	645	55	69	67			586	9,899	10,485
26	Cualac	Leopoldo Sánchez Morales	408	1,188			21		498		1,194	158	3,309	3,467
27	Cuautepec	Arquimides Quintero Díaz			3,492	1,320		75		2,102		277	6,989	7,266
28	Cuetzala del Progreso	Feliciano Álvarez Mecino		1,624	2,435		79		122			212	4,260	4,472
29	Cutzamala de Pinzón	Isidro Duarte Cabrera	169	3,995	5,476	502						396	10,142	10,538
30	Chilapa de Álvarez	Francisco Javier García González	1,433							21,348	21,089	2,147	43,870	46,017
31	Chilpancingo de los Bravo	Mario Moreno Arcos	3,522	44,576			1,692		1,647		35,601	5,116	87,038	92,154
32	Zumpango del Río	Ignacio Basilio García	653	6,717	4,185	139	1,205	5,441	73			1,178	18,413	19,591
33	Cruz Grande	Ociel Hugar García Trujillo	1,044		5,011				120	2,440		319	8,615	8,934
34	General Canuto A. Neri	Eleuterio Arandas Salgado		1,200	1,935	114						69	3,249	3,318
35	General Heliodoro Castillo	Mario Alberto Chávez Carbajal	1,918	4,503	5,645	233	303					717	12,602	13,319
36	Huamuxtitlán	Joohny Saucedo Romero	2,370	1,814			38				2,750	419	6,972	7,391
37	Huitzuco de los Figueroa	Norberto Figueroa Almazo	711	7,272	2,787	1,155	1,731	62	264			991	13,982	14,973
38	Iguala de la Independencia	José Luis Abarca Velázquez	2,848	14,668			10,623		1,705		21,546	2,875	51,390	54,265
39	Igualapa	Omar González Álvarez	619	1,294	2,844	166						198	4,923	5,121
40	Iliatenco	Israel Romero Sierra		1,305	1,690			865	371			133	4,231	4,364
41	Ixcateopan de Cuauhtémoc	Filiberta Honelia Barrera Bahena	141	1,833	1,899	20	56					174	3,949	4,123
42	José Joaquín de Herrera	Maurino Santos Merino	1,555	1,205	2,019	934		56				329	5,769	6,098
43	Juan R. Escudero	Elizabeth Gutiérrez Díaz	2,994	2,829			1,234		288		2,893	601	10,238	10,839
44	Juchitán	Demetrio Guzmán Aguilar	1,190	1,084	1,414		15					236	3,703	3,939
45	Chichihualco	Leopoldo Ramíro Cabrera Chávez	602	2,866	3,332	113	1,445	1,269	114			617	9,741	10,358
46	Malinaltepec	Aristóteles Tito Arrollo	559	2,193	3,834	3,136		83	59			573	9,864	10,437
47	Mártir de Cuilapán	José Guadalupe Rivera Ocampo	681	1,025	1,881	269	473	1,156	1,326			494	6,811	7,305
48	Marquelia	Javier Adame Montalvan	313	1,819	3,044	235	73		145			409	5,629	6,038
49	Metlatónoc	Neftalí Hernández Aguilar	921	1,402	2,456			1,758				277	6,537	6,814
50	Mochitlán	Cevero Espíritu Valenzo		1,959	2,511	410	251	131	293			386	5,555	5,941
51	Olinalá	Eusebio González Rodríguez	211	6,222							5,199	184	11,632	11,816
52	Ometepec	Antonio Atenojenes Vázquez Rodríguez	5,841						322	9,180	8,397	1,368	23,740	25,108
53	Pedro Ascencio Alquisiras	Francisco Prudencio Hernández Basave	20	1,260	1,453	162			589			126	3,484	3,610
54	Petatlán	Jorge Ramírez Espino		8,082	8,024	450	276	80	375			1,387	17,287	18,674
55	Pilcaya	Sandra Velazquez Lara	1,897	901	801	1,732	494	45	43			225	5,913	6,138
56	Pungarabato	Reynel Rodríguez Muñoz	252	8,349					220		7,593	404	16,414	16,818
57	Quechultenango	Antonio Navarrete Cortez	560	4,373	2,543		2,402	3,683	59			905	13,620	14,525
58	San Luis Acatlán	Alejandro Contreras Velasco	272		4,131	3,668		242	117	4,694		1,056	13,124	14,180
59	San Marcos	Gustavo Villanueva Barrera	6,547						240	5,613	8,755	1,076	21,155	22,231
60	San Miguel Totolapan	Saúl Beltran Orosco	1,437		4,435			65		4,947		279	10,884	11,163
61	Taxco de Alarcón	Salomón Majul González	8,923	19,531	13,364	1,443	1,852	587	347			2,735	46,047	48,782
62	Tecoanapa	Manuel Quiñonez Cortes	4,128	4,475			5,796		211		4,442	1,124	19,052	20,176
63	Tecpan de Galeana	Crisoforo Otero Heredia	397	7,268			395		7,904		9,545	1,422	25,509	26,931
64	Teloloapan	Ignacio de Jesús Valladares	2,330	4,901			673		424		11,514	1,341	19,842	21,183
65	Tepecoacuilco de Trujano	Antonio Garza Zavaleta	3,906	3,837	1,487	326	88	3,300	202			923	13,146	14,069
66	Tetipac	Néstor Serrano Rodríguez	1,422	3,432	1,431	59						231	6,344	6,575
67	Tixtla de Guerrero	Gustavo Alfredo Alcaraz Abarca	755	4,315	5,202	524	1,049	1,419	453			1,141	13,717	14,858
68	Tlacoapa	Efren Merino Sierra		1,893	1,939							147	3,832	3,979
69	Tlacoachistlahuaca	Amado Ramos Brito	1,802						209	3,216	2,280	432	7,507	7,939
70	Tlalchapa	María Guadalupe Aguiluz Bautista	337	2,737	3,284	180						156	6,538	6,694
71	Tlalixtaquilla de Maldonado	Joel Ángel Romero	85							1,362	1,613	66	3,060	3,126
72	Tlapa de Comonfort	Victoriano Wuences Real	4,905	7,423	6,984	8,660	159	69	314			2,081	28,514	30,595
73	Tlapehuala	Everaldo Wuences Santamaria	190	5,243	5,121	463			442			286	11,459	11,745
74	La Unión de Isidoro Montes de Oca	Crescencio Reyes Torres		6,033	7,368	49	42	66	146			910	13,704	14,614
75	Xalpatlahuac	Brijido Lorenzo de Jesús	61	1,184	1,968	884	21	964	214			334	5,296	5,630
76	Xochistlahuaca	Celerino Rojas Morales	171						35	5,059	6,866	614	12,131	12,745
77	Xochihuehuetlan	Fermín Rivera Peña	577	530	1,372	1,004			11			139	3,494	3,633
78	Zapotitlán Tablas	Pedro Vargas Ramírez	1,033	1,930							1,295	186	4,258	4,444
79	Zihuatanejo de Azueta	Eric Fernández Ballesteros	1,244	22,929			481		771		21,932	2,951	47,357	50,308
80	Zirándaro	Marcial Cárdenas Sánchez	222	4,111	4,455							186	8,788	8,974
81	Zitlala	Francisco Tecuchillo Neri	648	3,083	3,167	339	294	1,820	136			721	9,487	10,208
Total			130,174	323,856	212,267	37,444	43,934	46,007	32,618	159,756	332,808	68,968	1,318,864	1,387,832
Total number of municipalities won by each party/coalition			4	23	33	2	2	0	0	7	10			

=== Town Halls ===
Party/Alliance	Municipalities	+/-
Party of the Democratic Revolution	33	▲8
Institutional Revolutionary Party	23	▼17
Guerrero nos Une (PRD, Citizens' Movement, PT)	10	▲7
Compromiso por Guerrero (PRI, PVEM)	7	▲3
National Action Party	4	Steady
Labor Party	2	▲2
Ecologist Green Party of Mexico	2	Steady
Citizens' Movement	0	▼2
New Alliance Party	0	Steady
Total	81	
Source: Electoral Institute of the State of Guerrero.

=== State Congress ===
Party/Alliance	Districts relative majority	+/-
Party of the Democratic Revolution	12	▼1
Guerrero nos Une (PRD, Citizens' Movement, PT)	9	▲8
Institutional Revolutionary Party	5	▼6
Compromiso por Guerrero (PRI, PVEM)	2	Steady
National Action Party	0	▼1
Labor Party	0	Steady
Ecologist Green Party of Mexico	0	Steady
Citizens' Movement	0	Steady
New Alliance Party	0	Steady
Total	28	
Source: Electoral Institute of the State of Guerrero.

== See also ==
- Guerrero
- Congress of Guerrero
