= 5th federal electoral district of Guerrero =

Federal electoral district of Mexico

Guerrero's 5th
- Electoral district of the Chamber of Deputies of Mexico

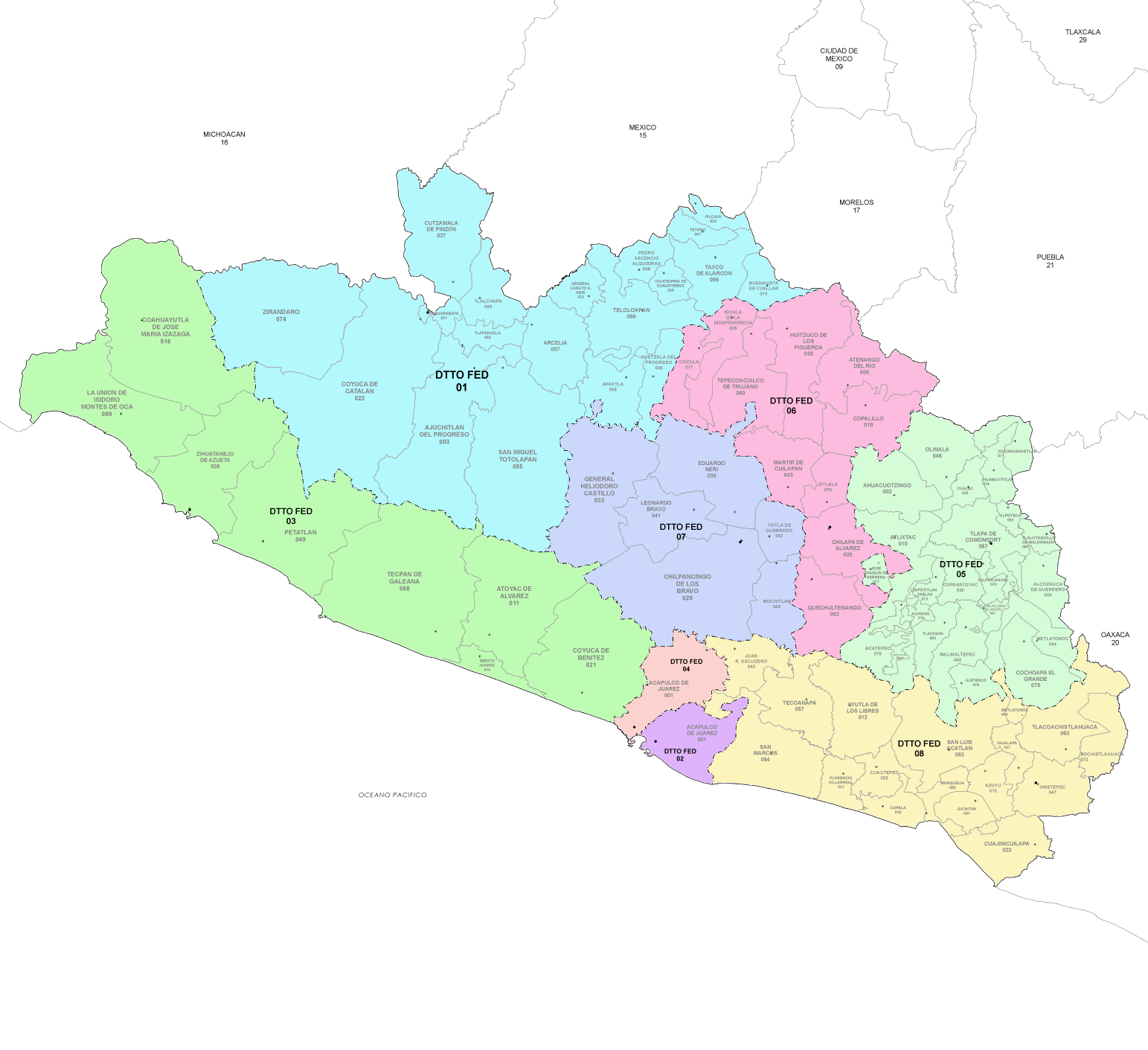
- 5th district since 2022

Incumbent
- Member: Gerardo Olivares Mejía
- Party: ▌Labour Party
- Congress: 66th (2024–2027)

District
- State: Guerrero
- Head town: Tlapa de Comonfort
- Coordinates: 17°33′N 98°35′W
- Covers: 23 municipalities: Acatepec, Ahuacuotzingo, Alcozauca, Alpoyeca, Atlamajalcingo del Monte, Atlixtac, Cochoapa el Grande, Copanatoyac, Cualac, Huamuxtitlán, Iliatenco, José Joaquín de Herrera, Malinaltepec, Metlatónoc (part), Olinalá, Tlacoapa, Tlalixtaquilla de Maldonado, Tlalixtaquilla, Tlapa, Xalpatláhuac, Xochihuehuetlán, Zapotitlán Tablas
- PR region: Fourth
- Precincts: 315
- Population: 453,410 (2020 census)
- Indigenous: Yes (85%)

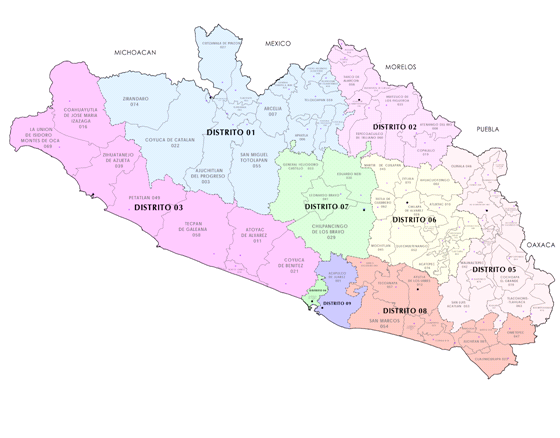
Guerrero under the 2017–2022 districting plan

The 5th federal electoral district of Guerrero (Spanish: Distrito electoral federal 05 de Guerrero) is one of the 300 electoral districts into which Mexico is divided for elections to the federal Chamber of Deputies and one of eight such districts in the state of Guerrero.

It elects one deputy to the lower house of Congress for each three-year legislative period by means of the first-past-the-post system. Votes cast in the district also count towards the calculation of proportional representation ("plurinominal") deputies elected from the fourth region.

The current member for the district, elected in the 2024 general election, is Gerardo Olivares Mejía of the Labour Party (PT).

== District territory ==
Guerrero lost a congressional seat in the 2023 redistricting process carried out by the National Electoral Institute (INE). Under the new districting plan, which is to be used for the 2024, 2027 and 2030 federal elections, the 5th district covers 315 electoral precincts (secciones electorales) across 23 municipalities in the easternmost part of the state's Mountain region:

- Acatepec, Ahuacuotzingo, Alcozauca, Alpoyeca, Atlamajalcingo del Monte, Atlixtac, Cochoapa el Grande, Copanatoyac, Cualac, Huamuxtitlán, Iliatenco, José Joaquín de Herrera, Malinaltepec, Olinalá, Tlacoapa, Tlalixtaquilla de Maldonado, Tlalixtaquilla, Tlapa, Xalpatláhuac, Xochihuehuetlán, Zapotitlán Tablas and a portion of Metlatónoc. (Note: The horseshoe-shaped municipality of Metlatónoc is split between the 5th and the 8th districts.)

The head town (cabecera distrital), where results from individual polling stations are gathered together and tallied, is the city of Tlapa de Comonfort. The district reported a population of 453,410 in the 2020 census; with Indigenous and Afrodescendent inhabitants accounting for over 85% of that total, it is classified by the National Electoral Institute (INE) as an indigenous district. (Note: The INE deems any local or federal electoral district where Indigenous or Afrodescendent inhabitants number 40% or more of the total population to be an indigenous district.)

== Previous districting schemes ==
Evolution of electoral district numbers
| | 1974 | 1978 | 1996 | 2005 | 2017 | 2023 |
|---|---|---|---|---|---|---|
| Guerrero | 6 | 10 | 10 | 9 | 9 | 8 |
| Chamber of Deputies | 196 | 300 | | | | |

Because of shifting population patterns, Guerrero currently has two fewer districts than the ten the state was assigned under the 1977 electoral reforms that set the national total at 300.

2017–2022

Between 2017 and 2022, Guerrero was allocated nine electoral districts. The 5th district had its head town at Tlapa de Comonfort and it comprised 18 municipalities in the eastern Mountain region:
- Alcozauca de Guerrero, Alpoyeca, Atlamajalcingo del Monte, Cochoapa el Grande, Cualac, Huamuxtitlán, Igualapa, Iliatenco, Malinaltepec, Metlatónoc, Olinalá, San Luis Acatlán, Tlacoachistlahuaca, Tlalixtaquilla de Maldonado, Tlapa de Comonfort, Xalpatláhuac, Xochihuehuetlán and Xochistlahuaca.

2005–2017

The 2005 districting plan assigned Guerrero nine districts. The 5th district's head town was at Tlapa de Comonfort and it covered a different configuration of 18 municipalities in the Mountain region:
- Acatepec, Alcozauca de Guerrero, Alpoyeca, Atlamajalcingo del Monte, Atlixtac, Copanatoyac, Igualapa, José Joaquín de Herrera, Malinaltepec, Metlatónoc, San Luis Acatlán, Tlacoachistlahuaca, Tlacoapa, Tlalixtaquilla de Maldonado, Tlapa de Comonfort, Xalpatláhuac, Xochistlahuaca and Zapotitlán Tablas.

1996–2005

Under the 1996 districting plan, which allocated Guerrero ten districts, the 5th district was located in the eastern Mountain region and had its head town at Tlapa de Comonfort. It comprised the following municipalities:
- Alcozauca, Alpoyeca, Copanatoyac, Cualac, Huamuxtitlán, Malinaltepec, Metlatónoc, Olinalá, Tlacoapa, Tlalixtaquilla, Tlapa de Comonfort, Xalpatláhuac and Xochihuehuetlán.

1978–1996

The districting scheme in force from 1978 to 1996 was the result of the 1977 electoral reforms, which increased the number of single-member seats in the Chamber of Deputies from 196 to 300. Under that plan, Guerrero's district allocation rose from six to ten. The 5th district had its head town at Tlapa de Comonfort and it covered 17 municipalities in the Mountain region:
- Alcozauca de Guerrero, Alpoyeca, Atlamajalcingo del Monte, Atlixtac, Copanatoyac, Cuautepec, Igualapa, Malinaltepec, Metlatónoc, San Luis Acatlán, Tlacoachistlahuaca, Tlacoapa, Tlalixtaquilla, Tlapa de Comonfort, Xalpatláhuac, Xochistlahuaca and Zapotitlán Tablas.

== Deputies returned to Congress ==
(Mexico) National parties
- Current
- PAN
- PRI
- PT
- PVEM
- MC
- Morena
- PAZ
- Somos
- Defunct or local only
- PLM
- PNR
- PRM
- PNM
- PP
- PPS
- PARM
- PFCRN
- CON
- PANAL
- PSD
- PES
- PES
- PRD

Guerrero's 5th district
| Election | Deputy | Party | Term | Legislature |
|---|---|---|---|---|
| 1976 | Reveriano García Castrejón | Institutional Revolutionary Party | 1976–1982 | 50th Congress |
| 1979 | Ulpiano Gómez Rodríguez | Institutional Revolutionary Party | 1979–1982 | 51st Congress |
| 1982 | Mario González Navarro | Institutional Revolutionary Party | 1982–1985 | 52nd Congress |
| 1985 | José Robles Catalán | Institutional Revolutionary Party | 1985–1988 | 53rd Congress |
| 1988 | Blas Vergara Aguilar | Institutional Revolutionary Party | 1988–1991 | 54th Congress |
| 1991 | Juan José Castro Justo | Institutional Revolutionary Party | 1991–1994 | 55th Congress |
| 1994 | Fernando Cruz Merino | Institutional Revolutionary Party | 1994–1997 | 56th Congress |
| 1997 | Juan José Castro Justo (Note: Castro Justo resigned his seat on 20 April 1999 to replace Guadalupe Gómez Maganda in the Senate.); Ezequiel Campos Sánchez | Institutional Revolutionary Party | 1997–1999; 1999–2000 | 57th Congress |
| 2000 | Sergio Maldonado Aguilar | Institutional Revolutionary Party | 2000–2003 | 58th Congress |
| 2003 | Javier Manzano Salazar | Party of the Democratic Revolution | 2003–2006 | 59th Congress |
| 2006 | Víctor Aguirre Alcaide | Party of the Democratic Revolution | 2006–2009 | 60th Congress |
| 2009 | Sofío Ramírez Hernández (Note: Ramírez Hernández was elected for the PRI but switched allegiance to the PRD in February 2011. He resigned his seat on 24 March 2011 to take office as Secretary of Rural Development of Guerrero. When his substitute, Villanueva de la Luz, was found murdered in September 2011, a number of PRI members accused Ramírez Hernández of involvement. He returned to his seat in Congress in December 2011.); Moisés Villanueva de la Luz | Institutional Revolutionary Party Party of the Democratic Revolution | 2009–2012 | 61st Congress |
| 2012 | Vicario Portillo Martínez | Party of the Democratic Revolution | 2012–2015 | 62nd Congress |
| 2015 | Victoriano Wences Real | Party of the Democratic Revolution | 2015–2018 | 63rd Congress |
| 2018 | Javier Manzano Salazar | National Regeneration Movement | 2018–2021 | 64th Congress |
| 2021 | Victoriano Wences Real | Labour Party (Mexico) | 2021–2024 | 65th Congress |
| 2024 | Gerardo Olivares Mejía | Labour Party (Mexico) | 2024–2027 | 66th Congress |

== Presidential elections ==
Guerrero's 5th district
| Election | District won by | Party or coalition | % |
|---|---|---|---|
| 2018 | Andrés Manuel López Obrador | Juntos Haremos Historia | 63.3554 |
| 2024 | Claudia Sheinbaum Pardo | Sigamos Haciendo Historia | 67.1397 |

== Notes ==
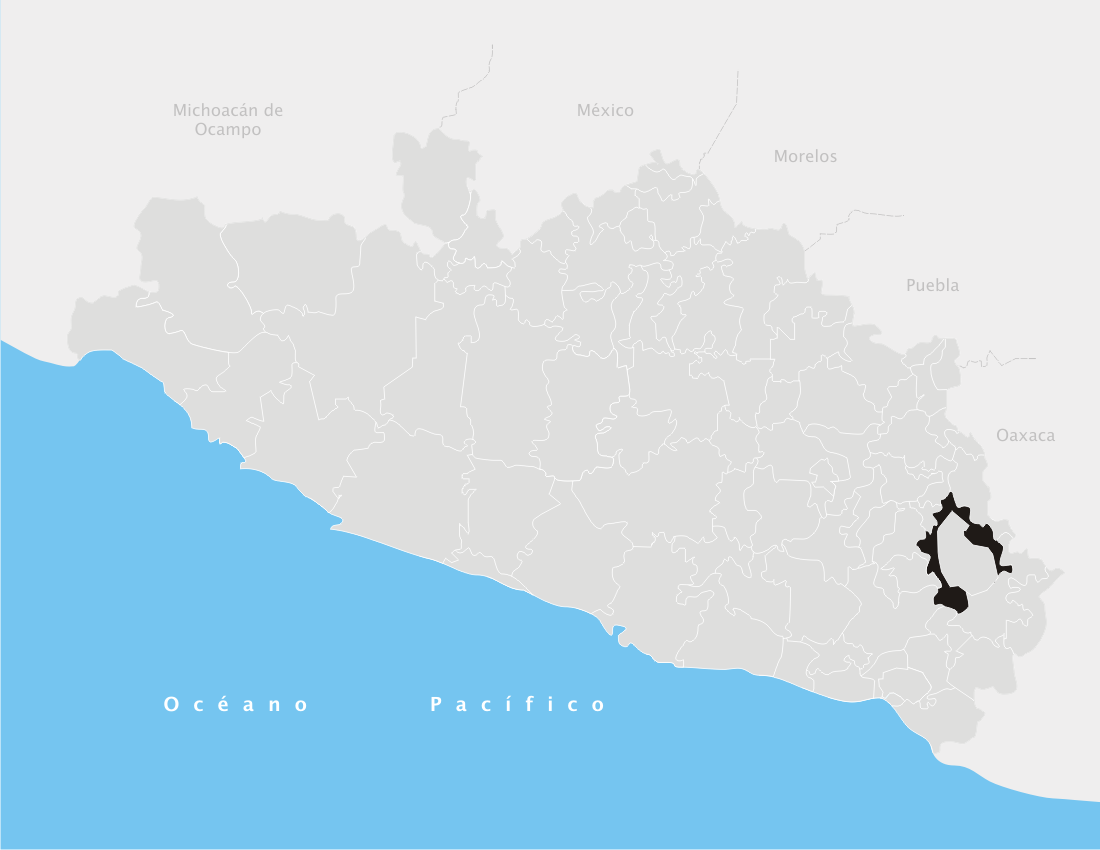
Municipality of Metlatónoc
