= 8th federal electoral district of Guerrero =

Federal electoral district of Mexico

Guerrero's 8th
- Electoral district of the Chamber of Deputies of Mexico

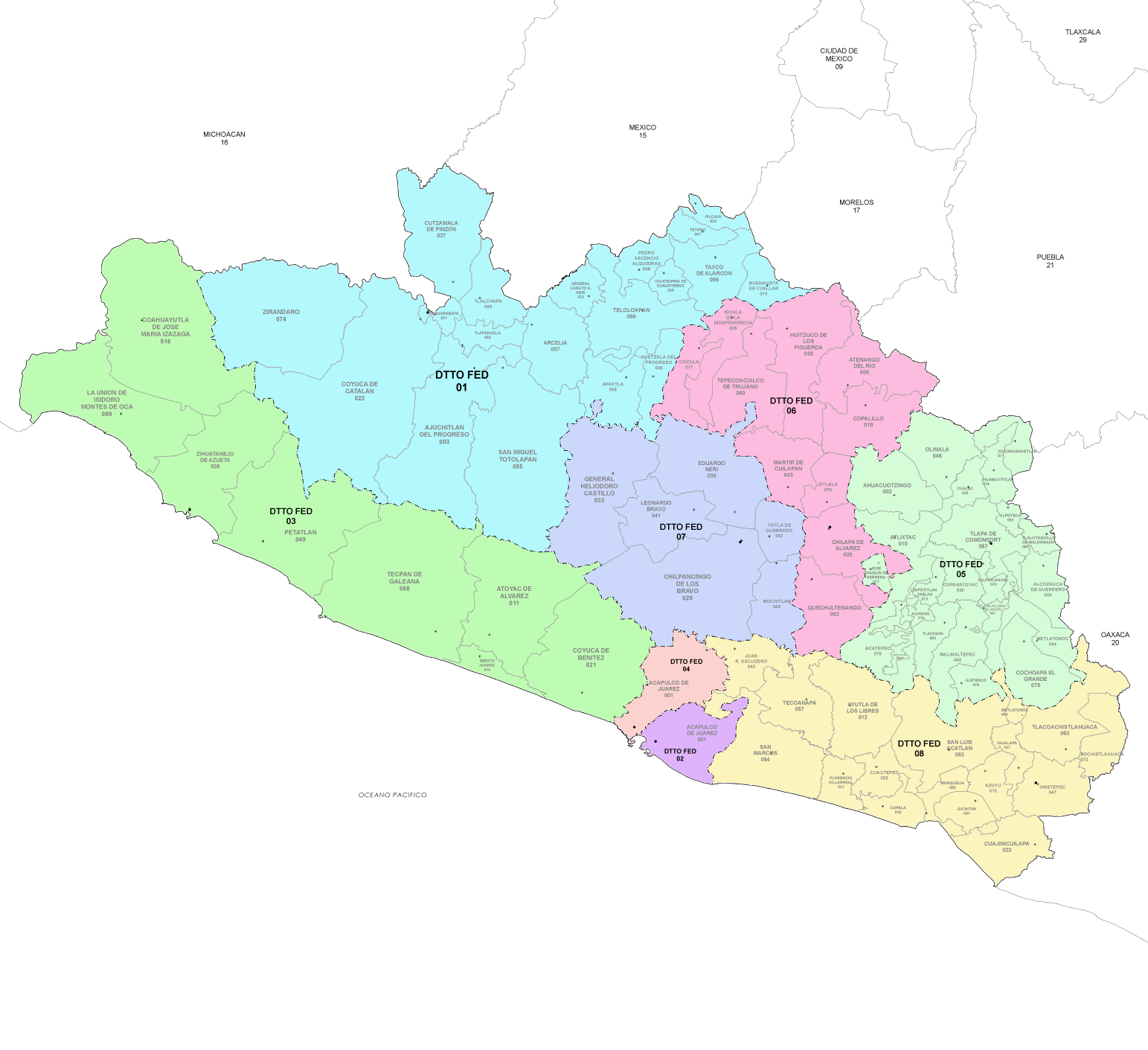
- 8th district since 2022

Incumbent
- Member: Marco Antonio de la Mora
- Party: ▌Ecologist Green Party
- Congress: 66th (2024–2027)

District
- State: Guerrero
- Head town: Ometepec
- Coordinates: 16°41′N 98°25′W
- Covers: 17 municipalities: Ayutla de los Libres, Azoyú, Copala, Cuautepec, Florencio Villarreal, Igualapa, Juan R. Escudero, Juchitán, Marquelia, Metlatónoc (part), Ometepec, San Luis Acatlán, San Marcos, Tecoanapa, Tlacoachistlahuaca, Xochistlahuaca
- PR region: Fourth
- Precincts: 383
- Population: 485,772 (2020 census)
- Indigenous: Yes (52%)

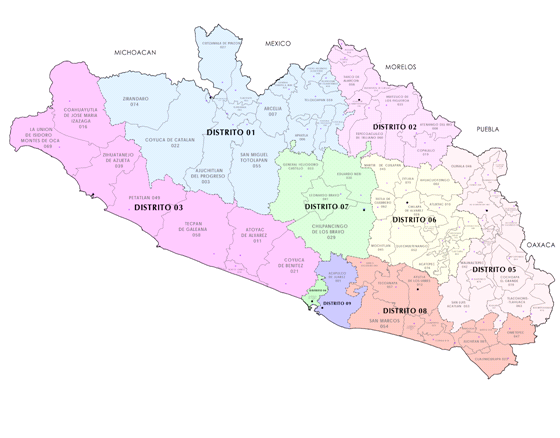
Guerrero under the 2017–2022 districting plan

The 8th federal electoral district of Guerrero (Spanish: Distrito electoral federal 08 de Guerrero) is one of the 300 electoral districts into which Mexico is divided for elections to the federal Chamber of Deputies and one of eight such districts in the state of Guerrero.

It elects one deputy to the lower house of Congress for each three-year legislative period by means of the first-past-the-post system. Votes cast in the district also count towards the calculation of proportional representation ("plurinominal") deputies elected from the fourth region.

The current member for the district, elected in the 2024 general election, is Marco Antonio de la Mora Torreblanca of the Ecologist Green Party of Mexico (PVEM).

== District territory ==
Guerrero lost a congressional seat in the 2023 redistricting process carried out by the National Electoral Institute (INE). Under the new districting plan, which is to be used for the 2024, 2027 and 2030 federal elections, the 8th district covers 383 electoral precincts (secciones electorales) across 17 municipalities in the state's south-eastern Costa Chica region:

- Ayutla de los Libres, Azoyú, Copala, Cuautepec, Florencio Villarreal, Igualapa, Juan R. Escudero, Juchitán, Marquelia, Ometepec, San Luis Acatlán, San Marcos, Tecoanapa, Tlacoachistlahuaca, Xochistlahuaca and a fraction of Metlatónoc. (Note: In the 2022 scheme, the horseshoe-shaped municipality of Metlatónoc is split between the fifth and the eighth districts.)

The head town (cabecera distrital), where results from individual polling stations are gathered together and tallied, is the city of Ometepec. The district reported a population of 485,772 in the 2020 census and, with Indigenous and Afrodescendent inhabitants accounting for over 52% of that total, it is classified by the INE as an indigenous district. (Note: The INE deems any local or federal electoral district where Indigenous or Afrodescendent inhabitants number 40% or more of the population to be an indigenous district.)

== Previous districting schemes ==
Evolution of electoral district numbers
	1974	1978	1996	2005	2017	2023
Guerrero	6	10	10	9	9	8
Chamber of Deputies	196	300				

Because of shifting population patterns, Guerrero currently has two fewer districts than the ten the state was assigned under the 1977 electoral reforms that set the national total at 300.

2017–2022

Between 2017 and 2022, Guerrero was allocated nine electoral districts. The 8th district had its head town at Ayutla de los Libres and it comprised 12 municipalities:
- Ayutla de los Libres, Azoyú, Copala, Cuajinicuilapa, Cuautepec, Florencio Villarreal, Juan R. Escudero, Juchitán, Marquelia, Ometepec, San Marcos and Tecoanapa.

2005–2017

The 2005 districting plan assigned Guerrero nine districts. The 8th district's head town was at Ayutla de los Libres. The district covered the same area as in 2017 plan but at the time comprised only ten municipalities. (Note: Juchitán was split off from Azoyú in 2004 and Marquelia was created from sections of Azoyú and Cuajinicuilapa in 2001, but neither are listed in the Federal Electoral Institute's 2005 Acuerdo.)

1996–2005

Under the 1996 districting plan, which allocated Guerrero ten districts, the 8th district had its head town at Ometepec and it covered 12 municipalities:
- Ayutla de los Libres, Azoyú, Copala, Cuajinicuilapa, Cuautepec, Florencio Villarreal, Igualapa, Ometepec, San Luis Acatlán, San Marcos, Tlacoachistlahuaca and Xochistlahuaca.

1978–1996

The districting scheme in force from 1978 to 1996 was the result of the 1977 electoral reforms, which increased the number of single-member seats in the Chamber of Deputies from 196 to 300. Under that plan, Guerrero's district allocation rose from six to ten. The newly restored 8th district was located inland, in the north of the state. Its head town was at the city of Taxco and it covered ten municipalities: (Note: Under the 1978 plan, the Costa Chica region was covered by the fifth and sixth districts.)
- Arcelia, Cutzamala de Pinzón, General Canuto A. Neri, Ixcateopan de Cuauhtémoc, Pedro Ascencio Alquisiras, Pilcaya, Taxco de Alarcón, Tetipac, Tlalchapa and Tlapehuala.

== Deputies returned to Congress ==
(Mexico) National parties
- Current
- PAN
- PRI
- PT
- PVEM
- MC
- Morena
- PAZ
- Somos
- Defunct or local only
- PLM
- PNR
- PRM
- PNM
- PP
- PPS
- PARM
- PFCRN
- CON
- PANAL
- PSD
- PES
- PES
- PRD

Guerrero's 8th district
Election	Deputy	Party	Term	Legislature
1922	Ezequiel Padilla Peñaloza		1922–1924	30th Congress
...
The 8th district was suspended between 1930 and 1979
1979	Filiberto Vigueras Lázaro	Institutional Revolutionary Party	1979–1982	51st Congress
1982	Luis Jaime Castro	Institutional Revolutionary Party	1982–1985	52nd Congress
1985	Píndaro Uriostegui Miranda	Institutional Revolutionary Party	1985–1988	53rd Congress
1988	Jaime Castrejón Diez	Institutional Revolutionary Party	1988–1991	54th Congress
1991	Luis Taurino Castro Jaime	Institutional Revolutionary Party	1991–1994	55th Congress
1994	Antelmo Alvarado García	Institutional Revolutionary Party	1994–1997	56th Congress
1997	Salvio Herrera Lozano (Note: Herrera Lozano resigned his seat on 9 August 2000.); Daría Divina Cruz Guillén	Institutional Revolutionary Party	1997–2000; 2000	57th Congress
2000	Santiago Guerrero Gutiérrez	Institutional Revolutionary Party	2000–2003	58th Congress
2003	Ángel Aguirre Rivero	Institutional Revolutionary Party	2003–2006	59th Congress
2006	Odilón Romero Gutiérrez	Party of the Democratic Revolution	2006–2009	60th Congress
2009	Ángel Aguirre Herrera (Note: Aguirre Herrera switched allegiance to the PRD in 2011.)	Institutional Revolutionary Party Party of the Democratic Revolution	2009–2012	61st Congress
2012	Sebastián de la Rosa Peláez	Party of the Democratic Revolution	2012–2015	62nd Congress
2015	Arturo Álvarez Angli	Ecologist Green Party of Mexico	2015–2018	63rd Congress
2018	Rubén Cayetano García	National Regeneration Movement	2018–2021	64th Congress
2021	Eunice Monzón García	Ecologist Green Party of Mexico	2021–2024	65th Congress
2024	Marco Antonio de la Mora	Ecologist Green Party of Mexico	2024–2027	66th Congress

== Presidential elections ==
Guerrero's 8th district
Election	District won by	Party or coalition	%
2018	Andrés Manuel López Obrador	Juntos Haremos Historia	63.1363
2024	Claudia Sheinbaum Pardo	Sigamos Haciendo Historia	75.6946

== Notes ==
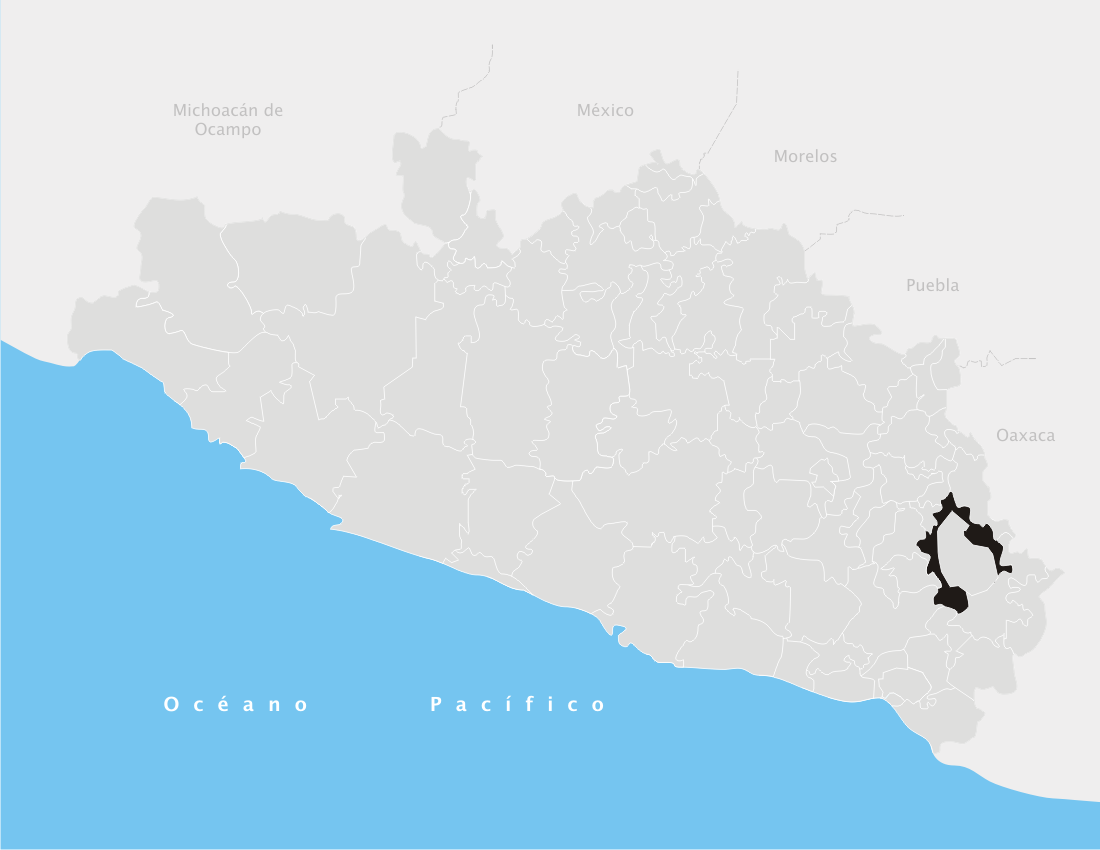
Municipality of Metlatónoc
