= Javier Manzano Salazar =

Mexican politician

- Born: 5 June 1963 (age 62); Alcozauca de Guerrero, Guerrero, Mexico
- Occupation: Politician
- Political party: PRDMORENA

Javier Alejandro Manzano Salazar (born 5 June 1963) is a Mexican politician. Previously affiliated with the Party of the Democratic Revolution (PRD), he later switched allegiance to the National Regeneration Movement (Morena).

In the 2003 mid-terms he was elected to the Chamber of Deputies to represent the fifth district of Guerrero for the PRD, and he was re-elected to the same seat, for Morena, in the 2018 general election.

He had previously served as municipal president of Alcozauca de Guerrero in 1994–1996 and in 1999–2002.
