= Moisés Villanueva de la Luz =

Mexican politician

- Born: 17 November 1964; Alcozauca, Guerrero, Mexico
- Died: 17 September 2011 (aged 46); Huamuxtitlán, Guerrero, Mexico
- Cause of death: Homicide
- Occupation: Politician
- Known for: Murder victim

Moisés Villanueva de la Luz (17 November 1964 – 17 September 2011) was a Mexican politician and a member of the Institutional Revolutionary Party (PRI). He served in both the Chamber of Deputies and the Congress of Guerrero.

Villanueva de la Luz was born in Alcozauca, Guerrero, on 17 November 1964. After studying for a degree in law and social sciences at the Autonomous University of Guerrero (UAG), his political career in the PRI progressed within the framework of the Confederación Nacional Campesina (National Peasant Confederation) in Guerrero, where he was regional coordinator and state political adviser, in addition to Visitor electoral trainer of the Agrarian agriculture, as well as a member of the Congress of Guerrero from 1999 to 2002. As the alternate federal deputy for Guerrero's 5th district, he succeeded Sofío Ramírez Hernández in that seat in the 61st Congress in 2009. On 30 March 2011 he took over leadership of the deputation and stood down as the owner in the Comisiónes de población, Fronteras y Asuntos Migratorios y Reforma Agraria (Chamber of Deputies was part of the Commission on Population, Borders and Migration Issues and Agrarian Reform).

He was reported missing on 4 September 2011 on the road between the cities of Chilapa and Tlapa, in the Mountain region of the state of Guerrero. He was found murdered next to his driver on 17 September in Huamuxtitlán.

In May 2020 an individual who had confessed that he had committed the double murder in exchange for a payment of 300,000 pesos from Mayor Willy Reyes was sentenced to 60 years in prison.

== See also ==
- List of unsolved murders (2000–present)
- List of solved missing person cases (post-2000)
