= Municipalities of Guerrero =

List of municipalities of Mexican state

Map of Mexico with Guerrero highlighted

Guerrero is a state in southern Mexico that is divided into 85 municipalities. According to the 2020 INEGI census, Guerrero is the 13th most populous state with 3,540,685 inhabitants and the 14th largest by land area spanning 63,803.42 square kilometres (24,634.64 sq mi).

Municipalities in Guerrero are administratively autonomous of the state according to the 115th article of the 1917 Constitution. Every three years, citizens elect a municipal president (Spanish: presidente municipal) by a plurality voting system who heads a concurrently elected municipal council (ayuntamiento) responsible for providing all the public services for their constituents. The municipal council consists of a variable number of trustees and councillors (regidores y síndicos). Municipalities are responsible for public services (such as water and sewerage), street lighting, public safety, traffic, and the maintenance of public parks, gardens and cemeteries. They may also assist the state and federal governments in education, emergency fire and medical services, environmental protection and maintenance of monuments and historical landmarks. Since 1984, they have had the power to collect property taxes and user fees, although more funds are obtained from the state and federal governments than from their own income.

The largest municipality by population in Guerrero is Acapulco, with 779,566 residents, and the smallest municipality is Atlamajalcingo del Monte with 5,811 residents. The largest municipality by land area is Coyuca de Catalán which spans 3,368.20 km^{2} (1,300.47 sq mi), and the smallest is Alpoyeca which spans 94.18 km^{2} (36.36 sq mi).

== Municipalities ==
Largest municipalities in Guerrero by population

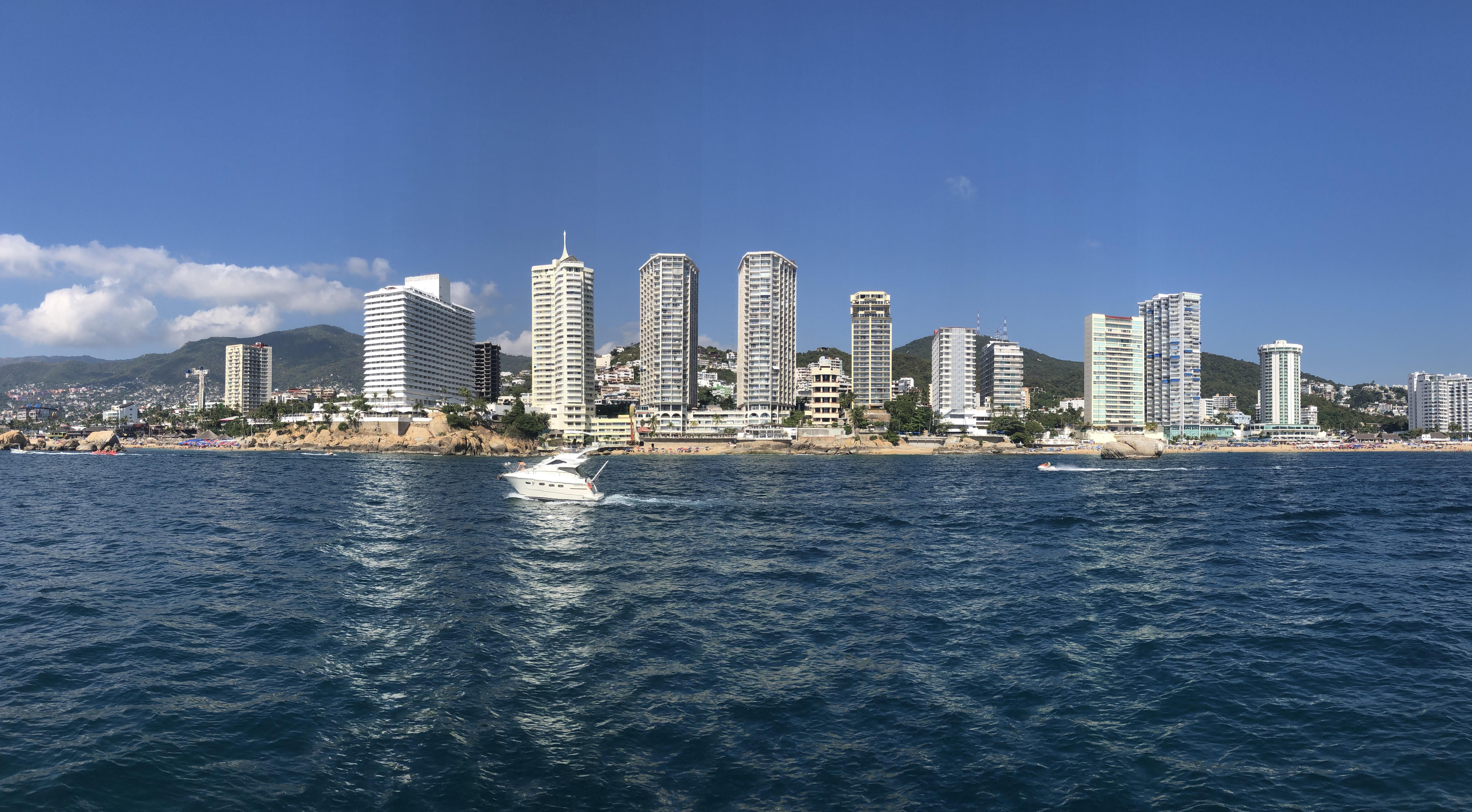
Acapulco, Guerrero's largest municipality by population

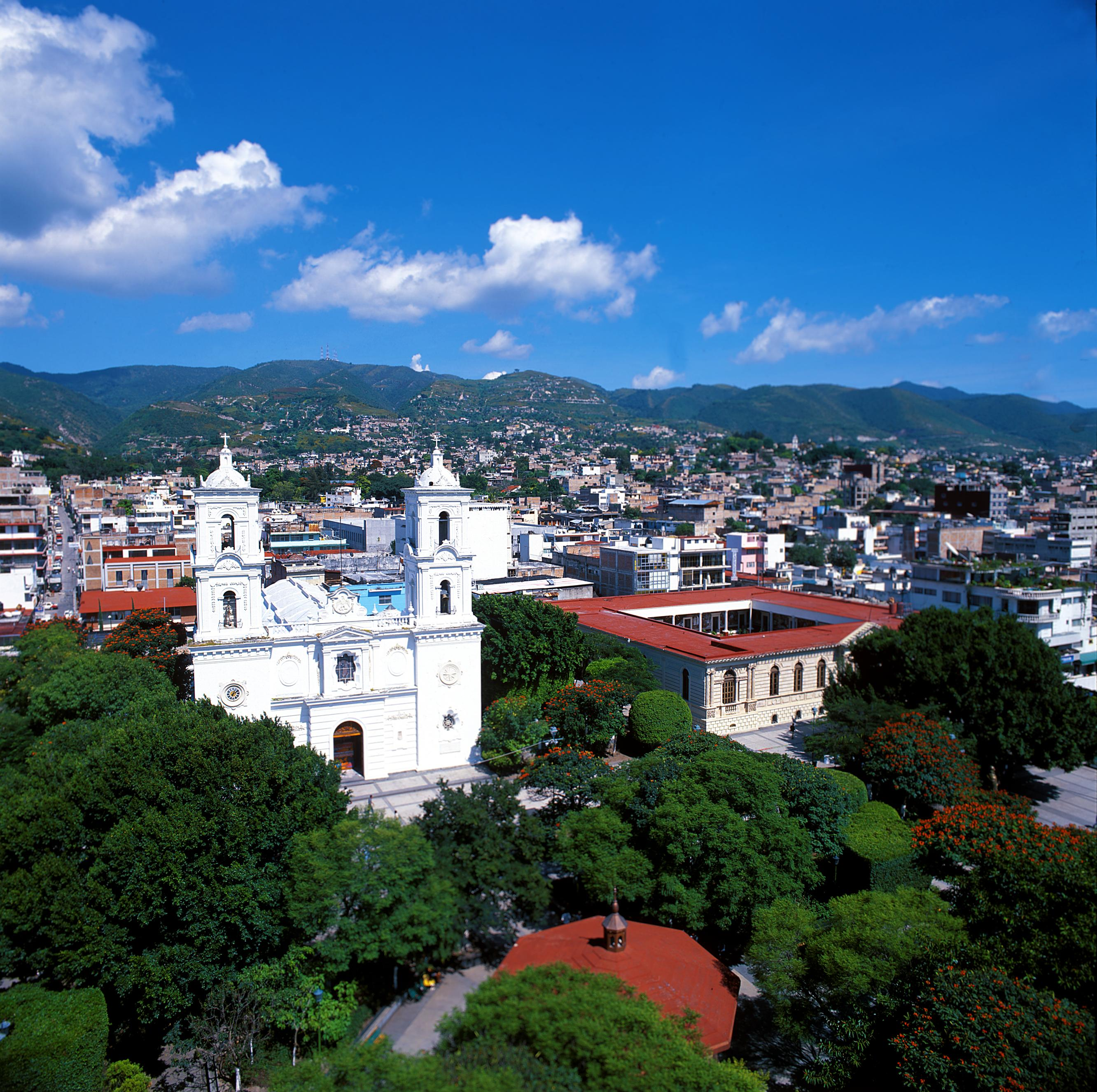
Chilpancingo, Guerrero's capital and second-largest municipality

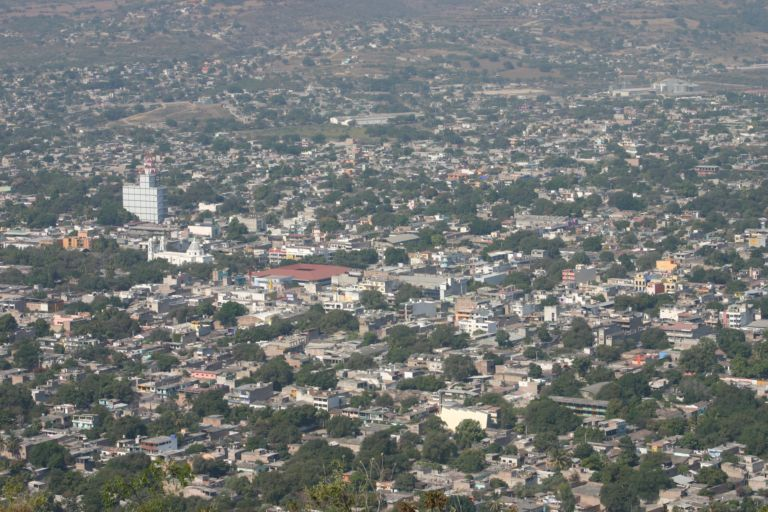
Iguala, third largest municipality in Guerrero

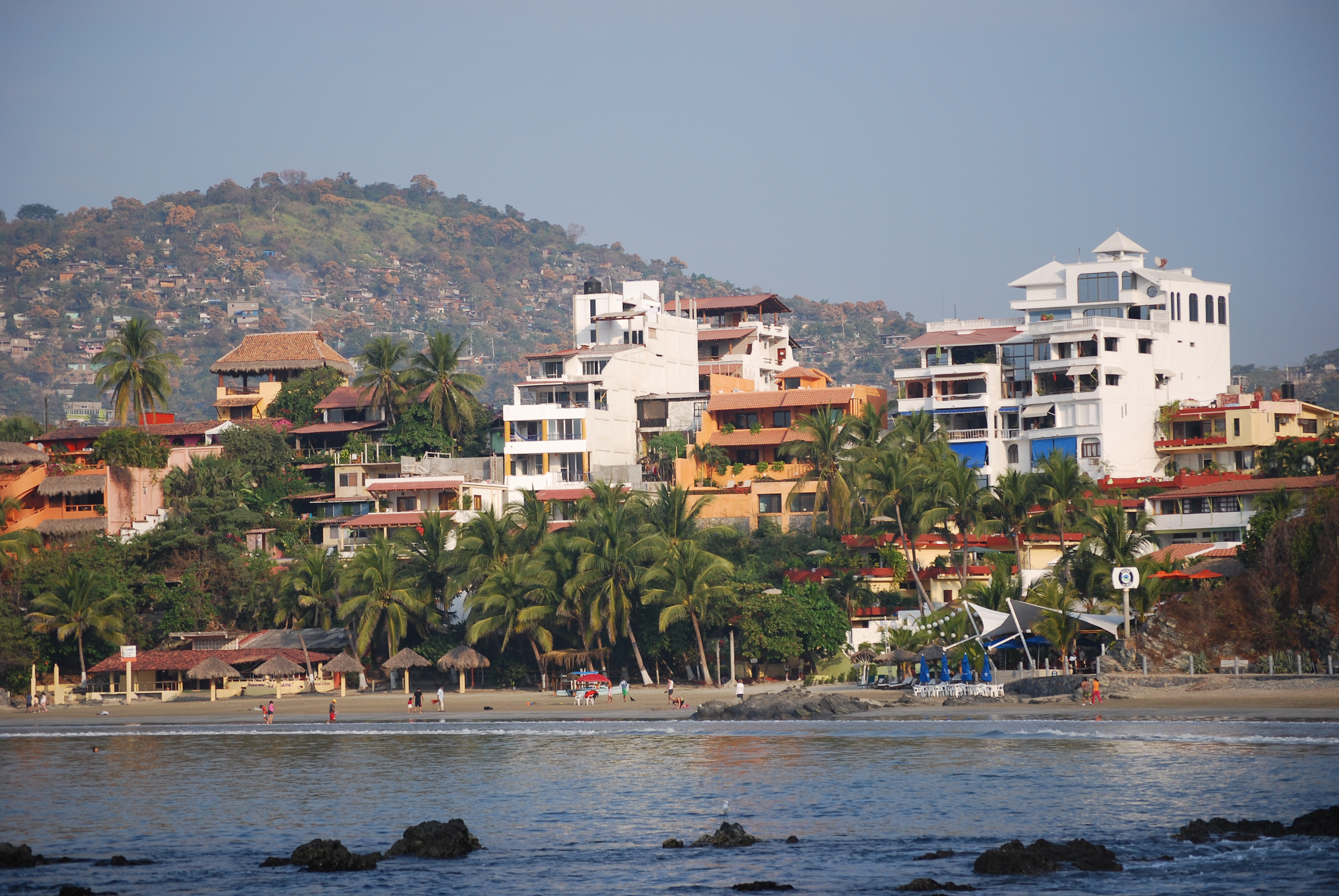
Zihuatanejo, Guerrero's fourth largest municipality

† State capital

Municipalities of Guerrero
Name	Municipal seat	Population (2020)	Population (2010)	Change	Land area		Population density (2020)	Incorporation date (Note: Incorporation years are included when there is no known primary source information on the date of amalgamation.)
Name	Municipal seat	Population (2020)	Population (2010)	Change	km^{2}	sq mi	Population density (2020)	Incorporation date
Acapulco	Acapulco de Juárez	779,566	789,971	−1.3%	1,733.61	669.35	449.7/km^{2} (1,164.7/sq mi)	August 6, 1824
Acatepec	Acatepec	40,197	32,792	+22.6%	632.85	244.35	63.5/km^{2} (164.5/sq mi)	March 23, 1993
Ahuacuotzingo	Ahuacuotzingo	25,205	25,027	+0.7%	874.14	337.51	28.8/km^{2} (74.7/sq mi)	1826
Ajuchitlán	Ajuchitlán del Progreso	37,655	38,203	−1.4%	2,000.88	772.55	18.8/km^{2} (48.7/sq mi)	1826
Alcozauca	Alcozauca de Guerrero	21,225	18,971	+11.9%	471.45	182.03	45.0/km^{2} (116.6/sq mi)	May 27, 1837
Alpoyeca	Alpoyeca	7,813	6,637	+17.7%	94.18	36.36	83.0/km^{2} (214.9/sq mi)	May 27, 1837
Apaxtla	Apaxtla de Castrejón	11,112	12,389	−10.3%	628.88	242.81	17.7/km^{2} (45.8/sq mi)	April 30, 1924
Arcelia (Note: Arcelia was originally incorporated as Totoltepec; it changed its name to Ixcatepec in 1874 and then to Arcelia on November 3, 1892.)	Arcelia	33,267	32,181	+3.4%	756.47	292.07	44.0/km^{2} (113.9/sq mi)	March 23, 1861
Atenango del Río	Atenango del Río	9,147	8,390	+9.0%	559.76	216.12	16.3/km^{2} (42.3/sq mi)	1826
Atlamajalcingo del Monte	Atlamajalcingo del Monte	5,811	5,706	+1.8%	147.00	56.76	39.5/km^{2} (102.4/sq mi)	May 27, 1837
Atlixtac	Atlixtac	28,491	26,341	+8.2%	575.33	222.14	49.5/km^{2} (128.3/sq mi)	May 27, 1837
Atoyac	Atoyac de Álvarez	60,680	61,316	−1.0%	1,454.17	561.46	41.7/km^{2} (108.1/sq mi)	November 29, 1880
Ayutla (Note: The municipality of Ñuu Savi was created from 37 localities in Ayutla on August 31, 2021, and the consequent change in population of 11,099 residents and land area is not reflected in the 2020 and 2010 census data.)	Ayutla de los Libres	69,123	62,690	+10.3%	1,055.26	407.44	65.5/km^{2} (169.7/sq mi)	May 27, 1837
Azoyú	Azoyú	15,099	14,429	+4.6%	397.31	153.40	38.0/km^{2} (98.4/sq mi)	May 27, 1837
Benito Juárez	San Jerónimo de Juárez	15,442	15,019	+2.8%	230.71	89.08	66.9/km^{2} (173.4/sq mi)	January 1, 1934
Buenavista	Buenavista de Cuéllar	12,982	12,688	+2.3%	304.93	117.73	42.6/km^{2} (110.3/sq mi)	January 17, 1934
Chilapa	Chilapa de Álvarez	123,722	120,790	+2.4%	752.17	290.42	164.5/km^{2} (426.0/sq mi)	August 6, 1824
Chilpancingo de los Bravo†	Chilpancingo de los Bravo	283,354	241,717	+17.2%	2,187.80	844.72	129.5/km^{2} (335.4/sq mi)	1826
Coahuayutla de José María Izazaga	Coahuayutla de Guerrero	12,408	13,025	−4.7%	2,653.49	1,024.52	4.7/km^{2} (12.1/sq mi)	November 29, 1880
Cochoapa el Grande	Cochoapa el Grande	21,241	18,778	+13.1%	622.64	240.40	34.1/km^{2} (88.4/sq mi)	January 29, 1947
Cocula	Cocula	15,579	14,707	+5.9%	446.83	172.52	34.9/km^{2} (90.3/sq mi)	November 29, 1880
Copala	Copala	14,463	13,636	+6.1%	297.57	114.89	48.6/km^{2} (125.9/sq mi)	October 6, 1869
Copalillo	Copalillo	15,598	14,456	+7.9%	734.84	283.72	21.2/km^{2} (55.0/sq mi)	December 10, 1875
Copanatoyac	Copanatoyac	21,648	18,855	+14.8%	307.63	118.78	70.4/km^{2} (182.3/sq mi)	November 29, 1880
Coyuca de Benítez	Coyuca de Benítez	73,056	73,460	−0.5%	1,816.84	701.48	40.2/km^{2} (104.1/sq mi)	May 4, 1876
Coyuca de Catalán	Coyuca de Catalán	38,554	42,069	−8.4%	3,368.20	1,300.47	11.4/km^{2} (29.6/sq mi)	December 10, 1831
Cuajinicuilapa (Note: The municipality of San Nicolás was created from 10 localities in Cuajinicuilapa on August 31, 2021, and the consequent change in population of 6,948 residents and land area is not reflected in the 2020 and 2010 census data.)	Cuajinicuilapa	26,627	25,922	+2.7%	633.77	244.70	42.0/km^{2} (108.8/sq mi)	April 1, 1852
Cualac	Cualac	7,874	7,007	+12.4%	239.99	92.66	32.8/km^{2} (85.0/sq mi)	May 27, 1837
Cuautepec	Cuautepec	17,024	15,115	+12.6%	315.04	121.64	54.0/km^{2} (140.0/sq mi)	May 27, 1837
Cuetzala del Progreso	Cuetzala del Progreso	8,272	9,166	−9.8%	374.21	144.48	22.1/km^{2} (57.3/sq mi)	May 11, 1874
Cutzamala	Cutzamala de Pinzón	20,537	21,388	−4.0%	1,339.79	517.30	15.3/km^{2} (39.7/sq mi)	1826
Eduardo Neri (Note: Eduardo Neri was originally incorporated as Zumpango del Río; it changed its name on October 13, 1987.)	Zumpango del Río	53,126	46,158	+15.1%	1,253.31	483.91	42.4/km^{2} (109.8/sq mi)	1826
Florencio Villarreal (Note: Florencio Villarreal was originally incorporated as Cruz Grande and changed its name on November 11, 1899.)	Cruz Grande	22,250	20,175	+10.3%	285.34	110.17	78.0/km^{2} (202.0/sq mi)	March 10, 1885
General Canuto A. Neri	Acapetlahuaya	6,278	6,301	−0.4%	260.87	100.72	24.1/km^{2} (62.3/sq mi)	December 30, 1953
General Heliodoro Castillo (Note: General Heliodoro Castillo was originally incorporated as Tlacotepec and changed its name on December 10, 1947.)	Tlacotepec	37,254	36,586	+1.8%	1,732.33	668.86	21.5/km^{2} (55.7/sq mi)	March 15, 1850
Huamuxtitlán	Huamuxtitlán	17,488	14,393	+21.5%	275.81	106.49	63.4/km^{2} (164.2/sq mi)	May 27, 1837
Huitzuco	Huitzuco de los Figueroa	36,593	37,364	−2.1%	1,331.81	514.22	27.5/km^{2} (71.2/sq mi)	1826
Iguala	Iguala de la Independencia	154,173	140,363	+9.8%	572.50	221.04	269.3/km^{2} (697.5/sq mi)	1826
Igualapa	Igualapa	11,739	10,815	+8.5%	195.78	75.59	60.0/km^{2} (155.3/sq mi)	May 27, 1837
Iliatenco	Iliatenco	11,679	10,522	+11.0%	241.06	93.07	48.4/km^{2} (125.5/sq mi)	November 25, 2005
Ixcateopan	Ixcateopan de Cuauhtémoc	6,138	6,603	−7.0%	212.77	82.15	28.8/km^{2} (74.7/sq mi)	1826
José Joaquín de Herrera	Hueycantenango	18,381	15,678	+17.2%	132.41	51.12	138.8/km^{2} (359.5/sq mi)	November 10, 2002
Juan R. Escudero	Tierra Colorada	26,093	24,364	+7.1%	410.16	158.36	63.6/km^{2} (164.8/sq mi)	December 26, 1953
Juchitán	Juchitán	7,559	7,166	+5.5%	254.64	98.32	29.7/km^{2} (76.9/sq mi)	March 5, 2004
Las Vigas (Note: The municipality of Las Vigas was created from 19 localities in San Marcos on August 31, 2021, and this change is not included in the 2020 or 2010 census figures. The population of Las Vigas is 9,449 as of the 2020 census.)	Las Vigas	—	—	—	—	—	—	August 31, 2021
La Unión de Isidoro Montes de Oca (Note: La Unión was originally incorporated as Zacatula; it changed its name to La Unión de Isidoro Montes de Oca on November 29, 1880.)	La Unión	26,349	25,712	+2.5%	1,765.85	681.80	14.9/km^{2} (38.6/sq mi)	August 6, 1824
Leonardo Bravo	Chichihualco	26,357	24,720	+6.6%	723.04	279.17	36.5/km^{2} (94.4/sq mi)	May 16, 1908
Malinaltepec (Note: The municipality Santa Cruz del Rincón was created from 19 localities in Malinaltepec on August 31, 2021, and the consequent change in population of 6,851 residents and land area is not reflected in the 2020 and 2010 census data.)	Malinaltepec	29,625	29,599	+0.1%	474.49	183.20	62.4/km^{2} (161.7/sq mi)	May 31, 1870
Marquelia	Marquelia	14,280	12,912	+10.6%	211.45	81.64	67.5/km^{2} (174.9/sq mi)	June 15, 2002
Mártir de Cuilapán (Note: Arcelia was originally incorporated as Apango; it changed its name to Atliaca in May 23, 1874 and then to Mártir de Cuilapán on November 27, 1926.)	Apango	18,613	17,702	+5.1%	617.32	238.35	30.2/km^{2} (78.1/sq mi)	1826
Metlatónoc	Metlatónoc	18,859	18,976	−0.6%	603.60	233.05	31.2/km^{2} (80.9/sq mi)	May 27, 1837
Mochitlán	Mochitlán	12,402	11,376	+9.0%	514.27	198.56	24.1/km^{2} (62.5/sq mi)	April 2, 1852
Ñuu Savi (Note: The municipality of Ñuu Savi was created from 37 localities in Ayutla on August 31, 2021, and this change is not included in the 2020 or 2010 census figures. Ñuu Savi has a population of 11,099 as of the 2020 census.)	Coapinola	—	—	—	—	—	—	August 31, 2021
Olinalá	Olinalá	28,446	24,723	+15.1%	709.19	273.82	40.1/km^{2} (103.9/sq mi)	May 27, 1837
Ometepec	Ometepec	68,207	61,306	+11.3%	604.68	233.47	112.8/km^{2} (292.1/sq mi)	March 20, 1824
Pedro Ascencio Alquisiras	Ixcapuzalco	7,076	6,978	+1.4%	295.15	113.96	24.0/km^{2} (62.1/sq mi)	November 28, 1890
Petatlán	Petatlán	44,583	44,979	−0.9%	1,978.09	763.74	22.5/km^{2} (58.4/sq mi)	April 1, 1870
Pilcaya	Pilcaya	12,753	11,558	+10.3%	162.79	62.85	78.3/km^{2} (202.9/sq mi)	December 10, 1931
Pungarabato	Ciudad Altamirano	38,482	37,035	+3.9%	126.72	48.93	303.7/km^{2} (786.5/sq mi)	December 10, 1831
Quechultenango	Quechultenango	36,143	34,728	+4.1%	848.28	327.52	42.6/km^{2} (110.4/sq mi)	1826
San Luis Acatlán	San Luis Acatlán	46,270	42,360	+9.2%	1,101.36	425.24	42.0/km^{2} (108.8/sq mi)	November 29, 1880
San Marcos (Note: The municipality of Las Vigas was created from 19 localities in San Marcos on August 31, 2021, and the consequent change in population of 9,449 residents and land area is not reflected in the 2020 and 2010 census data.)	San Marcos	50,124	48,501	+3.3%	1,160.38	448.03	43.2/km^{2} (111.9/sq mi)	1826
San Miguel Totolapan	San Miguel Totolapan	24,139	28,009	−13.8%	2,378.57	918.37	10.1/km^{2} (26.3/sq mi)	June 23, 1871
San Nicolás (Note: The municipality of San Nicolás was created from 10 localities in Cuajinicuilapa on August 31, 2021, and this change is not included in the 2020 or 2010 census figures. The population of is 6,948 as of the 2020 census.)	San Nicolás	—	—	—	—	—	—	August 31, 2021
Santa Cruz del Rincón (Note: The municipality of Santa Cruz del Rincón was created from 19 localities in Malinaltepec on August 31, 2021, and this change is not included in the 2020 or 2010 census figures. The population of Santa Cruz del Rincón is 6,851 as of the 2020 census.)	Santa Cruz del Rincón	—	—	—	—	—	—	August 31, 2021
Taxco	Taxco de Alarcón	105,586	104,053	+1.5%	652.73	252.02	161.8/km^{2} (419.0/sq mi)	August 6, 1824
Tecoanapa	Tecoanapa	46,063	44,079	+4.5%	699.86	270.22	65.8/km^{2} (170.5/sq mi)	July 3, 1874
Tecpan	Tecpan de Galeana	65,237	62,071	+5.1%	2,854.47	1,102.12	22.9/km^{2} (59.2/sq mi)	October 13, 1811
Teloloapan	Teloloapan	53,817	53,769	+0.1%	1,012.59	390.96	53.1/km^{2} (137.7/sq mi)	1826
Tepecoacuilco de Trujano	Tepecoacuilco de Trujano	30,806	30,470	+1.1%	855.63	330.36	36.0/km^{2} (93.3/sq mi)	1826
Tetipac	Tetipac	13,552	13,128	+3.2%	218.48	84.36	62.0/km^{2} (160.7/sq mi)	July 1, 1872
Tixtla	Tixtla de Guerrero	43,171	40,058	+7.8%	389.90	150.54	110.7/km^{2} (286.8/sq mi)	August 6, 1824
Tlacoachistlahuaca	Tlacoachistlahuaca	22,781	21,306	+6.9%	805.48	311.00	28.3/km^{2} (73.3/sq mi)	May 11, 1872
Tlacoapa (Note: Tlacoapa was originally incorporated as Totomixtlahuaca and changed its name to Tlacoapa on May 30, 1885.)	Tlacoapa	10,092	9,967	+1.3%	280.90	108.45	35.9/km^{2} (93.1/sq mi)	May 27, 1837
Tlalchapa	Tlalchapa	11,681	11,495	+1.6%	473.52	182.83	24.7/km^{2} (63.9/sq mi)	October 20, 1851
Tlalixtaquilla	Tlalixtaquilla de Maldonado	7,602	7,096	+7.1%	117.83	45.50	64.5/km^{2} (167.1/sq mi)	December 13, 1944
Tlapa	Tlapa de Comonfort	96,125	81,419	+18.1%	611.02	235.91	157.3/km^{2} (407.5/sq mi)	March 20, 1824
Tlapehuala	Tlapehuala	22,209	21,819	+1.8%	285.60	110.27	77.8/km^{2} (201.4/sq mi)	November 5, 1947
Xalpatláhuac	Xalpatláhuac	11,966	12,240	−2.2%	227.38	87.79	52.6/km^{2} (136.3/sq mi)	November 29, 1880
Xochihuehuetlán	Xochihuehuetlán	7,862	7,079	+11.1%	262.46	101.33	30.0/km^{2} (77.6/sq mi)	May 27, 1837
Xochistlahuaca	Xochistlahuaca	29,891	28,089	+6.4%	454.74	175.58	65.7/km^{2} (170.2/sq mi)	May 27, 1837
Zapotitlán Tablas	Zapotitlán Tablas	12,004	10,516	+14.1%	229.11	88.46	52.4/km^{2} (135.7/sq mi)	March 25, 1870
Zihuatanejo de Azueta (Note: Zihuatanejo was originally incorporated as José Azueta; it changed its name to Zihuatanejo de Azueta on May 6, 2008.)	Zihuatanejo	124,824	118,211	+5.6%	1,472.67	568.60	84.8/km^{2} (219.5/sq mi)	December 23, 1953
Zirándaro	Zirándaro de los Chávez	18,031	18,813	−4.2%	2,151.64	830.75	8.4/km^{2} (21.7/sq mi)	December 10, 1831
Zitlala	Zitlala	21,977	22,587	−2.7%	305.66	118.02	71.9/km^{2} (186.2/sq mi)	1826
Guerrero	—	3,540,685	3,388,768	+4.5%	63,803.42	24,634.64	55.5/km^{2} (143.7/sq mi)	—
Mexico	—	126,014,024	112,336,538	+12.2%	1,960,646.7	757,010	64.3/km^{2} (166.5/sq mi)	—
