= Vicario Portillo Martínez =

Mexican politician

- Born: 6 November 1960 (age 65); San Luis Acatlán, Guerrero, Mexico
- Occupation: Deputy
- Political party: PRD

Vicario Portillo Martínez (born 6 November 1960) is a Mexican politician affiliated with the Party of the Democratic Revolution (PRD). In the 2012 general election he was elected to the Chamber of Deputies to represent the fifth district of Guerrero during the 62nd Congress.
