= Tototepec, Guerrero =

Coordinates: 17°26′N 98°35′W

Tototepec Yozononi
- Town
- Interactive map of Tototepec
- Country: Mexico
- State: Guerrero
- Elevation: 1,670 m (5,480 ft)

Population (2012)
  - Total: 2,573

Tototepec is a town located in the state of Guerrero in Mexico. It is located in the municipality of Tlapa de Comonfort and has a population of 2,573 as of 2012. In Mixteco, the indigenous language of the region, the town is known as Yozononi. The town's elevation is 1,670 meters above sea level.
