= Ángel Aguirre Herrera =

Mexican politician

- Born: 26 October 1984; Chilpancingo, Guerrero, Mexico
- Died: 17 January 2017 (aged 32); Ciudad de México
- Occupation: Politician
- Political party: PRD

Ángel Aguirre Herrera (26 October 1984 – 17 January 2017) was a Mexican politician. At different times he was afflilated with both the Institutional Revolutionary Party (PRI) and the Party of the Democratic Revolution (PRD).

In the 2009 mid-terms he was elected to the Chamber of Deputies to represent the eighth district of Guerrero during the 61st Congress (2009–2012). Originally elected for the PRI, he switched allegiance to the PRD in 2011.

Aguirre Herrera was the son of Ángel Aguirre Rivero, who served as governor of Guerrero from 2011 to 2014. He died from a brain aneurysm in 2017.
