= Sebastián de la Rosa Peláez =

Mexican politician

- Born: 20 January 1963 (age 63); San Juan Cacahuatepec, Oaxaca, Mexico
- Education: Autonomous University of Guerrero
- Occupation: Deputy
- Political party: PTMC

Sebastián Alfonso de la Rosa Peláez (born 20 January 1963) is a Mexican politician. At different times he has been affiliated with the Party of the Democratic Revolution (PRD) and the Citizens' Movement.

De la Rosa Peláez was born in San Juan Cacahuatepec, Oaxaca, in 1963. He graduated in Ibero-American literature from the Autonomous University of Guerrero in 1989.

In the 2012 general election he was elected to the Chamber of Deputies to represent the eighth district of Guerrero for the PRD during the 62nd Congress.
