= Odilón Romero Gutiérrez =

Mexican politician

- Born: 24 October 1957 (age 68); Guerrero, Mexico
- Occupation: Politician
- Political party: PRD

Odilón Romero Gutiérrez (born 24 October 1957) is a Mexican politician affiliated with the Party of the Democratic Revolution (PRD). In the 2006 general election he was elected to the Chamber of Deputies to represent the eighth district of Guerrero during the 60th Congress. He had previously served as municipal president of Ayutla de los Libres, Guerrero, from 1996 to 1999.
