= Víctor Aguirre Alcaide =

Mexican politician

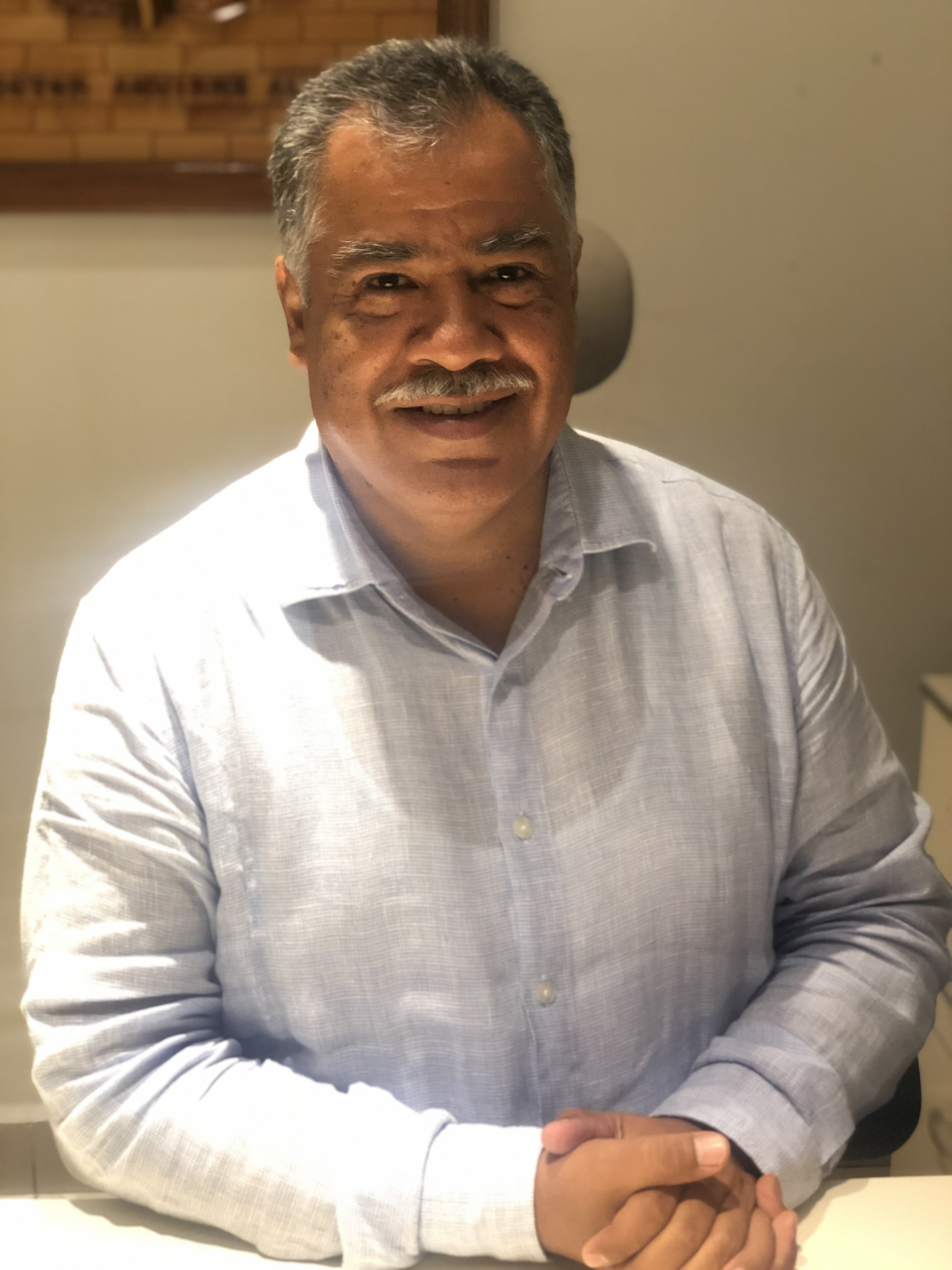
- Acapulqueño, Político, miembro del PRD y líder de la corriente interna "Unidad de Izquierda Guerrerense".
- Born: July 28, 1972 (age 54); Acapulco, Guerrero, Mexico
- Education: Autonomous University of Guerrero
- Occupation: Politician
- Notable credit(s): Líder de la corriente "Unidad de Izquierda Guerrerense" (UIG, PRD)

Víctor Aguirre Alcaide (born 28 July 1972) is a Mexican politician affiliated with the Party of the Democratic Revolution (PRD). In the 2006 general election he was elected to the Chamber of Deputies to represent the fifth district of Guerrero during the 60th Congress.
