= San Luis Acatlán =

Town in the Mexican state of Guerrero

- Municipal seat and town
- Location within Guerrero Location within Mexico
- Coordinates: 17°25′N 99°13′W
- Country: Mexico
- State: Guerrero
- Municipality: San Luis Acatlán

Population (2005)
  - Total: 7,938
- Time zone: UTC-6 (Zona Centro)

San Luis Acatlán is the seat of the municipality of San Luis Acatlán, located in the Mexican state of Guerrero. It is located in the Costa Chica region of the state, about 158 km from Acapulco. Most often called simply "Acatlán", the name comes from the locality of Acatlán de Osorio located in the modern state of Puebla. The name itself derives from Nahuatl, meaning "among the reeds". Indigenous shepherds from Puebla arrived to this place between two rivers in Guerrero around 1750. San Luis derives from the name it was given in 1522 when soldiers of Pedro de Alvarado arrived here on this saint's day (August 25).

The town's population as of 2005 was 7,938.

== History ==
The areas has been occupied by Mixtecs and Tlapanecos since the seventh century. Around 1457, the territory was conquered by the Aztec Empire, under the rule of Moctezuma Ilhuicamina. A number of stories exist about the town's beginnings but the most widely accepted has that the area was settled by the Tlapanecos, a group descended from a race called the Yopes. This group was in constant struggle with the Mexicas and other groups that caused them to move around in search of safer ground. In their wanderings, these people also founded towns such as Cintla, Tepetlapa, Ayutla de Álvarez, Suchitonala and Azoyú.

In 1522, after the Spanish conquest, soldiers associated with Pedro de Alvarado arrived, asking him for authorization to found a Spanish town here after discovering gold in a nearby river. Alvarado came here under orders of Hernán Cortés to establish the town, naming it Villa de San Luis. In 1531, nearby Yopes attacked it. The Spanish response was to attack the Yopes, killing most, and taking many of their young as slaves. The few that remained dispersed to Oaxaca and Central America down to Nicaragua.

After the river's gold ran out, the town became deserted. In 1532, the area was annexed to a town named Jalapa or Ayacaxtla. It was not until 1591, when the town became officially independent again due to efforts of the Jesuits to repopulate it. Around 1750, Olmeca shepherds migrating from Acatlán de Osorio, Puebla settled here, naming it after the place they came from and building their homes among Spanish ruins. Later Zapotecs from Oaxaca and another group called the Xalpatlahuac from the low mountainous region of Guerrero joined them. The town was nearly wiped out again in 1825 when a large flood left few survivors.

== Festival ==
=== Atlzazilistle (Festival to petition for rain) ===
In late April and early May, the Nahuas in this community participate in this event of pre-Hispanic origins to bring about the rainy season and to assure good crops. Community members who have migrated as far as Mexico City and Ciudad Nezahualcóyotl return each year for this event. The festival begins on April 25 with the blessing of the seeds and climaxes in the beginning of May with a number of events. During this time these people offer birds, flowers, food, copal and wax figures at the various hills and other places considered sacred. However, the highlight of this event are the staged fights among various masked figures.

The rain petition begins on the last days of the festival when men in masks, wearing jute sacks and carrying whips, called "tlacololeros" move in procession to the community leader's house. Here they offer the leader (called a "mayordomo") mezcal and pozole to invite him to the ceremonies. After this, the entire community goes to church as the church bells ring. In the early morning of May 2, dances dating back to pre-Hispanic times are performed. On May 3, there is a procession to Mount Cruzco. Last but not least, in the center of the town, men with leather masks, huge gloves and orange, yellow or green overalls painted to make them look like tigers (or sometimes jaguars) gather in groups of up to 22 to stage fights. The belief is that the harder the tigers fight, the more abundant the rains will be when they come. Each tiger is anonymous and fighters take care to dress away from everyone else to maintain that anonymity. Younger boys, are dressed similarly by their fathers, with cardboard masks and have the tasks of keeping the crowds back and sometimes helping one tiger against another. The adult tigers, called "tecuani" have leather masks decorated by local artisans, some of which are worth as much as US$200.
