= Tlapa de Comonfort (municipality) =

Municipality in the Mexican state of Guerrero

- Municipality
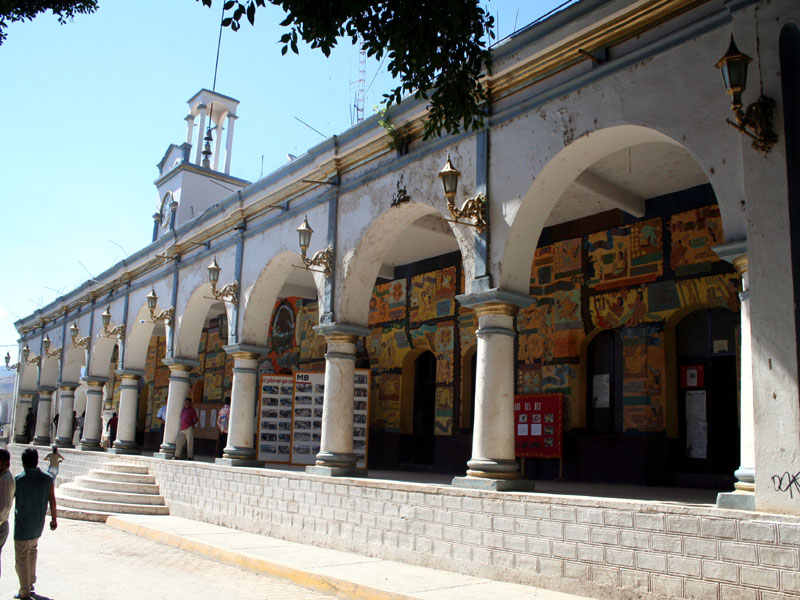
- Town hall

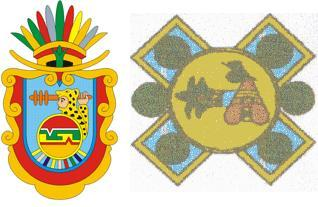
- Coat of arms

- Location in Mexico
- Coordinates: 17°30′N 98°27′W
- Country: Mexico
- State: Guerrero
- Municipal seat: Tlapa de Comonfort

Area
  - Total: 1,054 km^{2} (407 sq mi)

Population (2005)
  - Total: 65,763

Tlapa de Comonfort is a municipality in the Mexican state of Guerrero. The municipal seat lies at Tlapa de Comonfort. The municipality covers an area of 1,054 km^{2}.

As of 2005, the municipality had a total population of 65,763.
