= Atlamajalcingo del Monte (municipality) =

Municipality in the Mexican state of Guerrero

- Municipality
- Coat of arms

- Location in Mexico
- Coordinates: 18°13′N 99°29′W
- Country: Mexico
- State: Guerrero
- Municipal seat: Atlamajalcingo del Monte

Area
  - Total: 199.4 km^{2} (77.0 sq mi)

Population (2005)
  - Total: 5,143

Atlamajalcingo del Monte is a municipality in the Mexican state of Guerrero, being the least populous municipality in Guerrero. The municipal seat lies at Atlamajalcingo del Monte. The municipality covers an area of 199.4 km^{2}.

As of 2005, the municipality had a total population of 5,143.
