= Juchitán (municipality) =

Municipality in the Mexican state of Guerrero

- Municipality
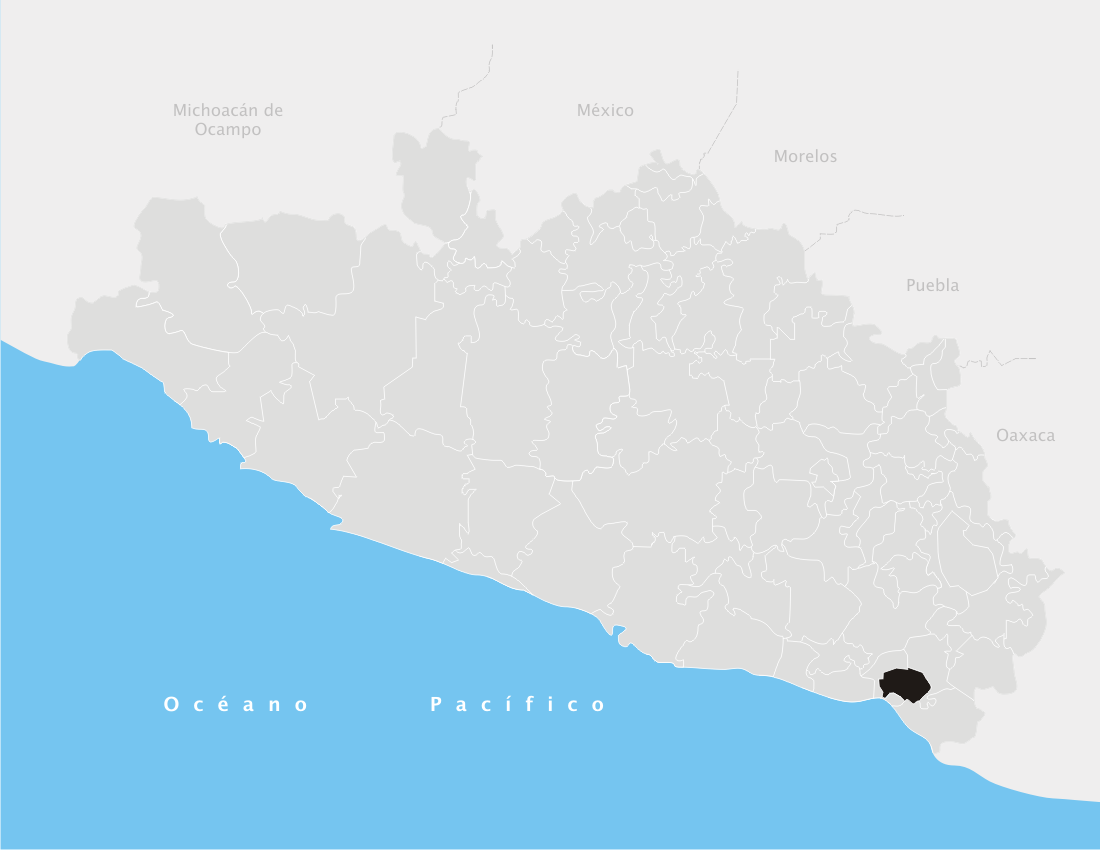
- Municipality of Juchitán in Guerrero

- Location in Mexico
- Coordinates: 16°37′N 98°38′W
- Country: Mexico
- State: Guerrero
- Municipal seat: Juchitán

Area
  - Total: 1,142 km^{2} (441 sq mi)

Population (2005)
  - Total: 6,240

Juchitán is a municipality in the Mexican state of Guerrero. The municipal seat lies at Juchitán. Founded in 2004, it is one of the newest municipalities in Guerrero.

As of 2005, the municipality had a total population of 6,240.

The municipality of Juchitán was created on 5 March 2004 with its excision from the municipality of Azoyú; as of February 2008, it was Guerrero's newest municipality.
