= Xalpatláhuac (municipality) =

Municipality in the Mexican state of Guerrero

- Municipality
- Location in Mexico Xalpatláhuac (Mexico)
- Coordinates: 17°20′N 98°39′W
- Country: Mexico
- State: Guerrero
- Municipal seat: Xalpatláhuac

Area
  - Total: 393.6 km^{2} (152.0 sq mi)

Population (2005)
  - Total: 12,615

Xalpatláhuac is a municipality in the Mexican state of Guerrero. The municipal seat lies at Xalpatláhuac. The municipality covers an area of 393.6 km^{2}.

In 2005, the municipality had a total population of 12,615.
