= Malinaltepec (municipality) =

Municipality in the Mexican state of Guerrero

- Municipality
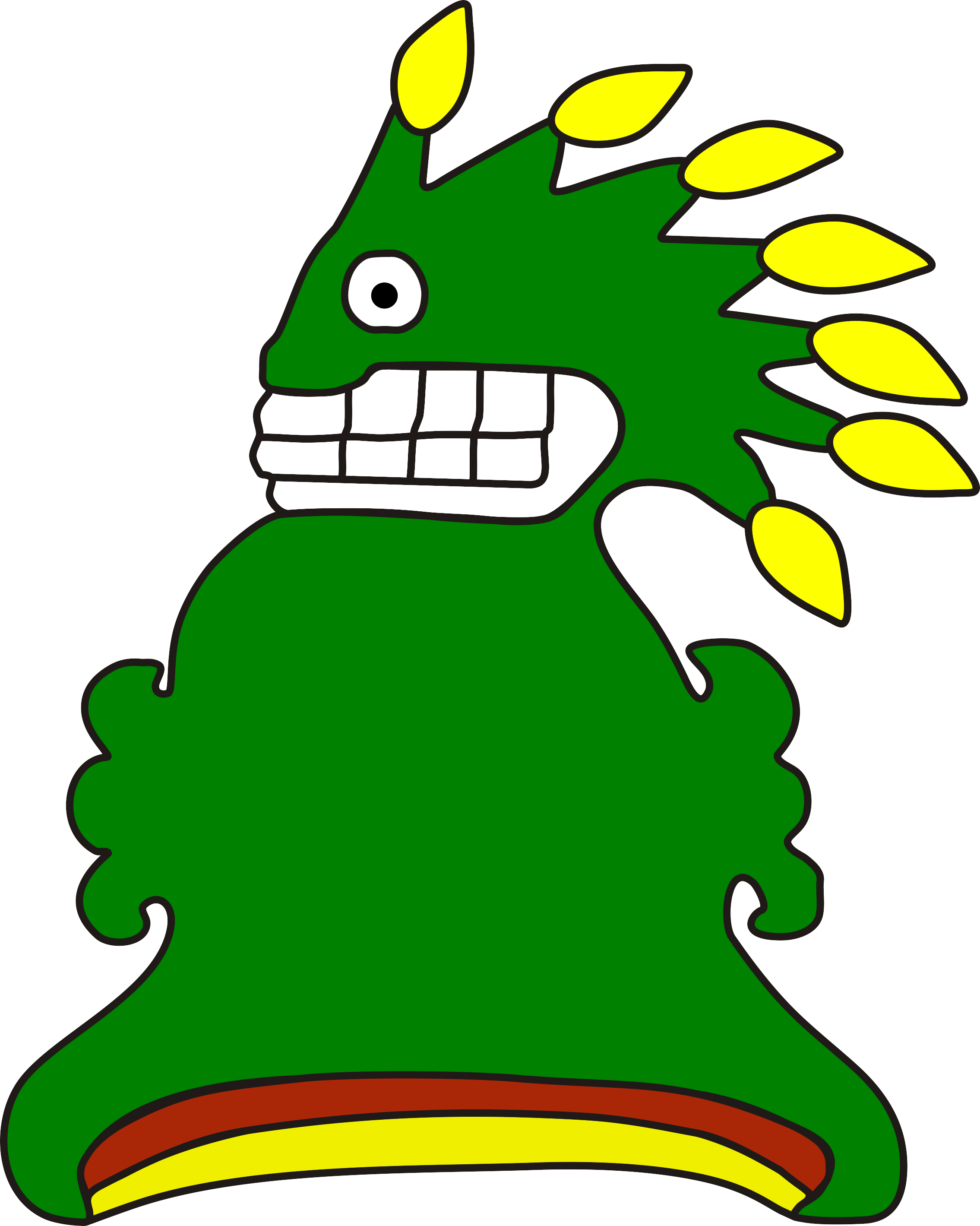
- Coat of arms

- Location in Mexico
- Coordinates: 16°57′N 98°36′W
- Country: Mexico
- State: Guerrero
- Municipal seat: Malinaltepec

Area
  - Total: 492 km^{2} (190 sq mi)

Population (2005)
  - Total: 26,613

Malinaltepec is a municipality in the Mexican state of Guerrero. The municipality covers an area of 492 km^{2}.

As of 2005, the municipality had a total population of 26,613.
