= Azoyú (municipality) =

Municipality in the Mexican state of Guerrero

- Municipality
- Coat of arms

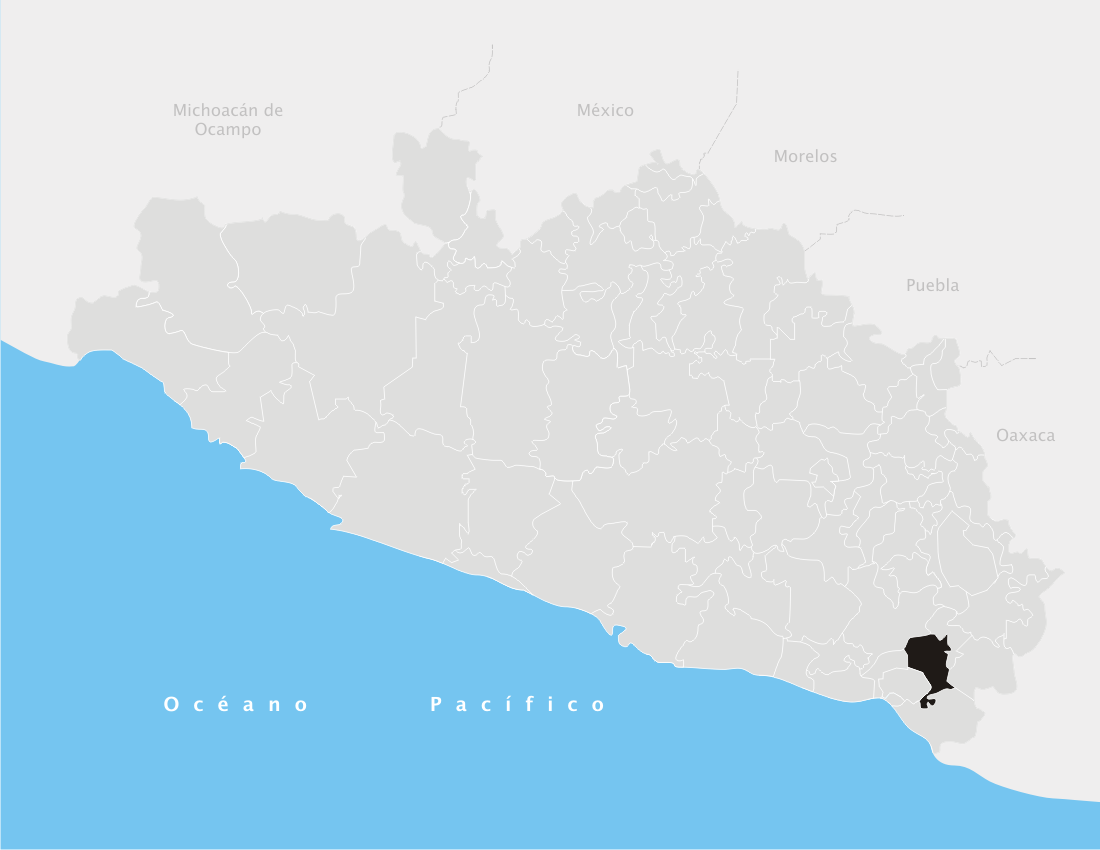
- Municipality of Azoyu in Guerrero

- Location in Mexico
- Coordinates: 16°45′N 98°36′W
- Country: Mexico
- State: Guerrero
- Municipal seat: Azoyu

Area
  - Total: 784.6 km^{2} (302.9 sq mi)

Population (2005)
  - Total: 13,448

Azoyú is a municipality in the Mexican state of Guerrero. The municipal seat lies at Azoyu. The municipality covers an area of 784.6 km^{2}.

In 2005, the municipality had a total population of 13,448.
