= Tecoanapa (municipality) =

Municipality in the Mexican state of Guerrero

- Municipality
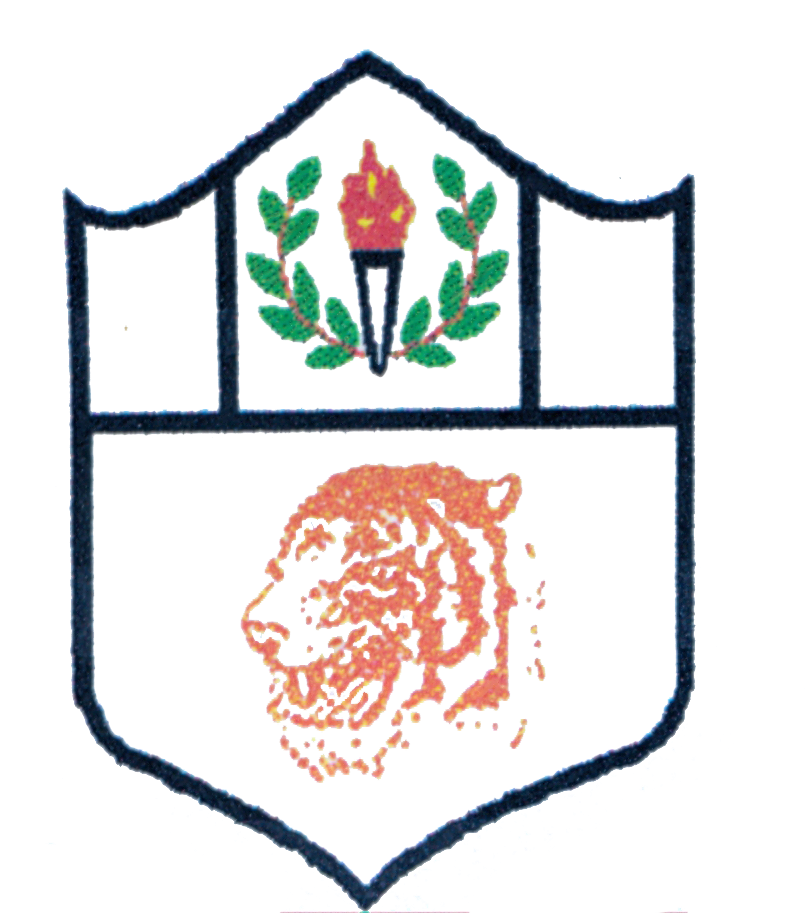
- Coat of arms

- Location in Mexico
- Coordinates: 16°48′N 99°09′W
- Country: Mexico
- State: Guerrero
- Municipal seat: Tecoanapa

Area
  - Total: 776.9 km^{2} (300.0 sq mi)

Population (2005)
  - Total: 42,619

Tecoanapa is a municipality in the Mexican state of Guerrero. The municipal seat lies at Tecoanapa. The municipality covers an area of 776.9 square kilometres (300.0 mi^{2}).

In 2005, the municipality had a population of 42,619.

== Gallery ==
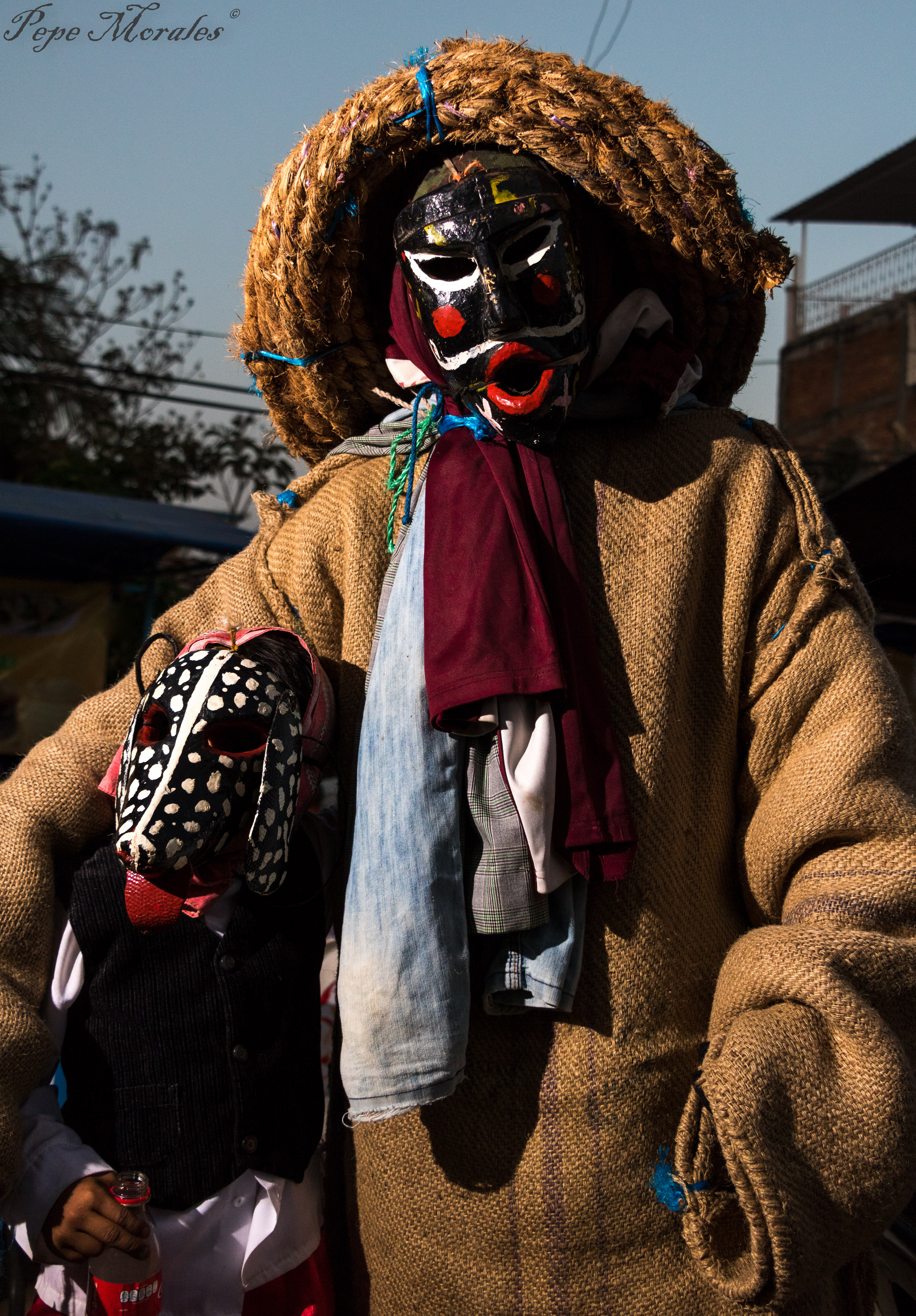
Danzante Tlacololero and his son in Las Ánimas, Municipality of Tecoanapa, Guerrero. Mex.

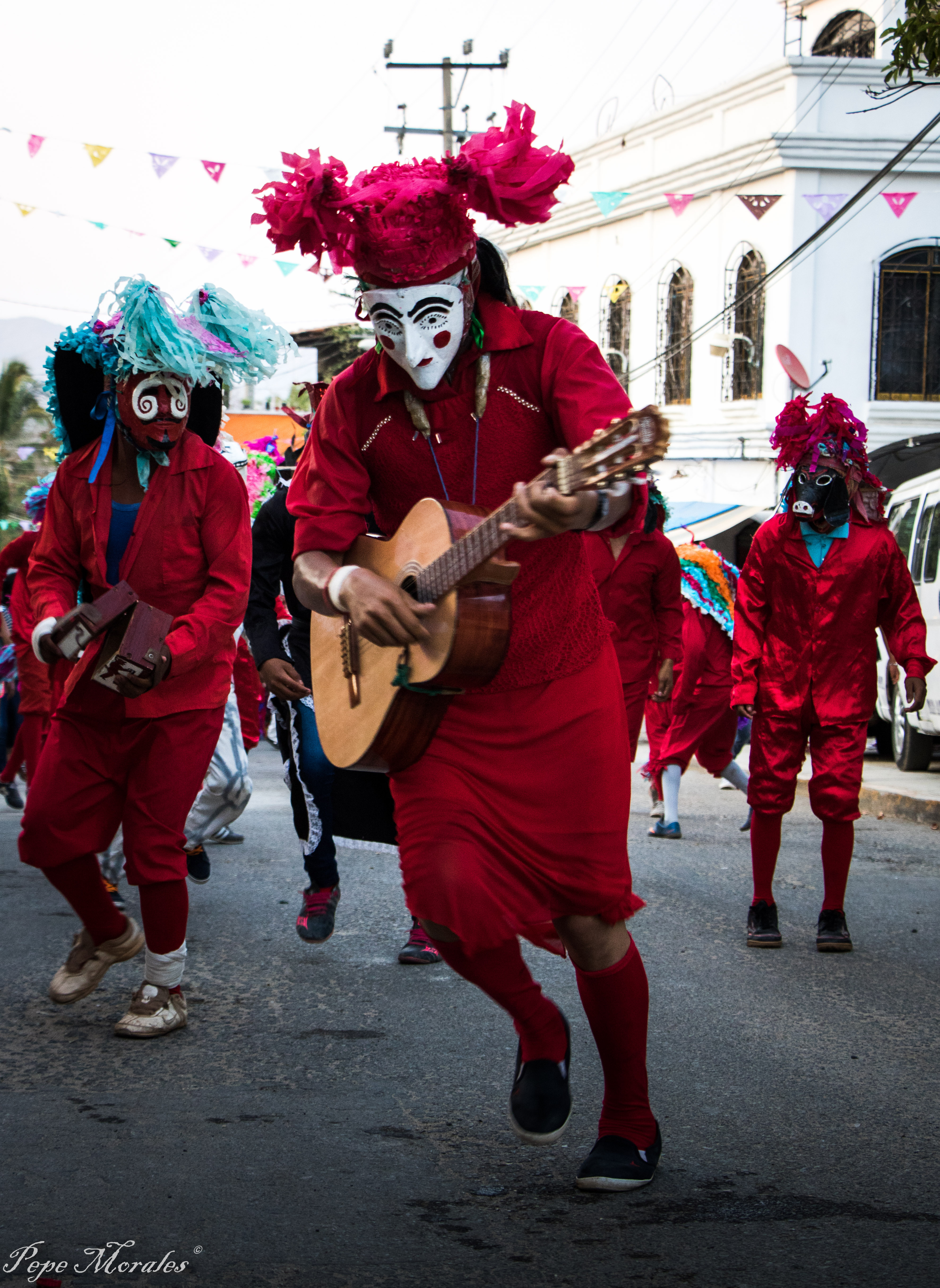
Dance of "Los Diablos". Las Ánimas, Municipality of Tecoanapa, Guerrero, Mex.

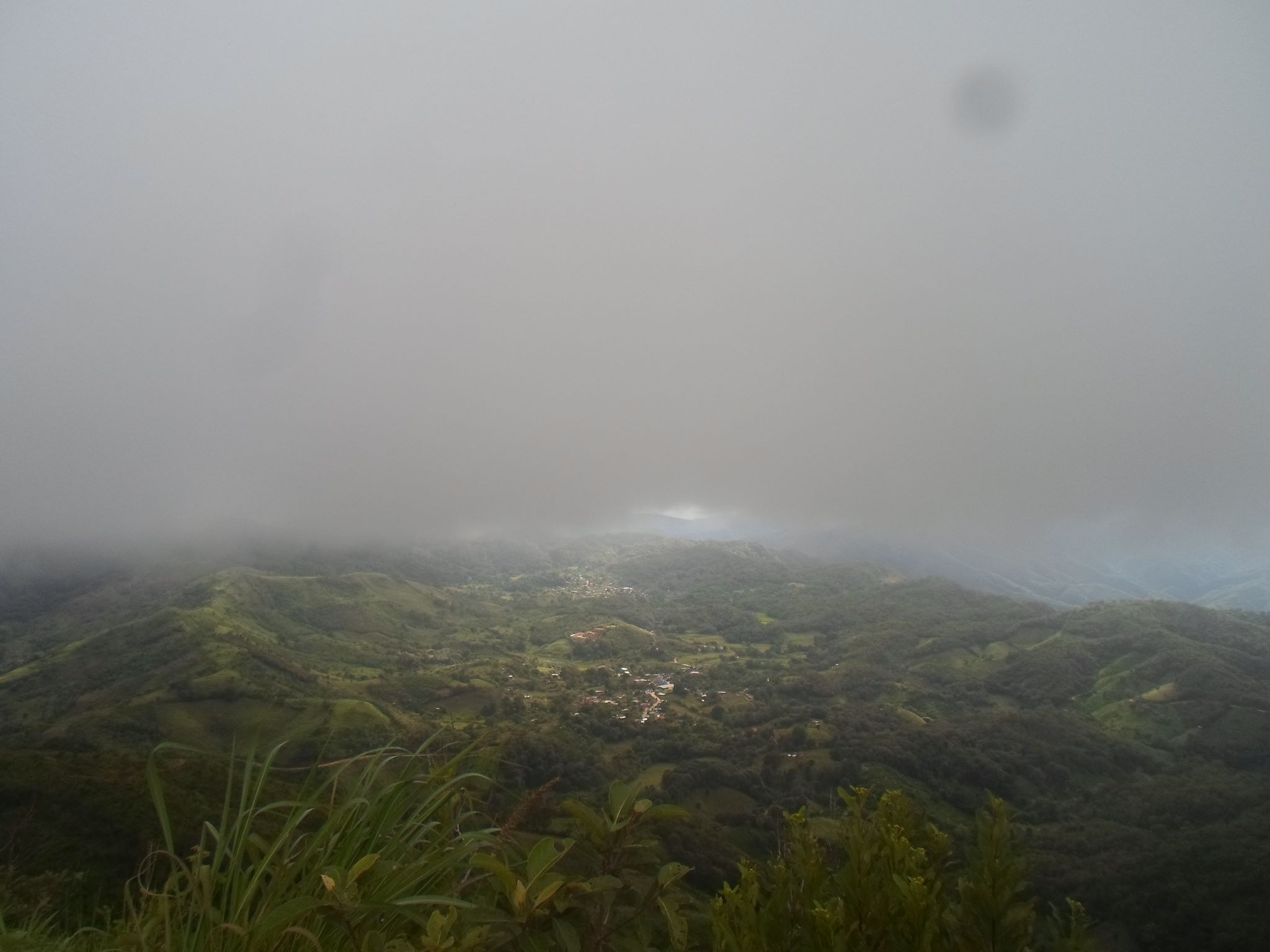
Los Magueyitos, small town in the municipality of Tecoanapa.
