= Acatepec (municipality) =

Municipality in the Mexican state of Guerrero

- Municipality
- Location in Mexico
- Coordinates: 16°51′N 98°40′W
- Country: Mexico
- State: Guerrero
- Municipal seat: Acatepec

Area
  - Total: 599 km^{2} (231 sq mi)

Population (2010)
  - Total: 32,792

Acatepec is a municipality in the Mexican state of Guerrero. The municipal seat lies at Acatepec. The municipality covers an area of 599 km^{2}.

In 2010, the municipality had a total population of 32,792, up from 28,525 in 2005.
