= San Luis Acatlán (municipality) =

Municipality in the Mexican state of Guerrero

- Municipality
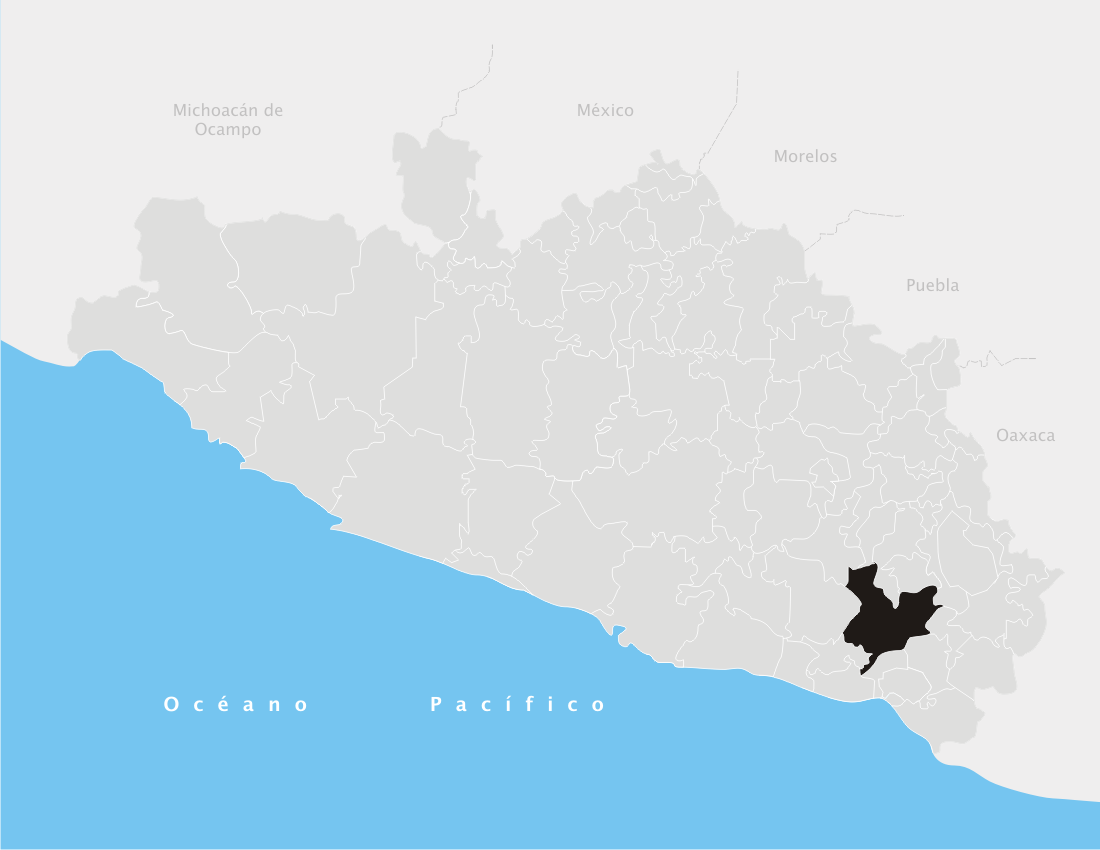
- Municipality of San Luis Acatlán in Guerrero

- Location in Mexico
- Coordinates: 16°32′N 98°03′W
- Country: Mexico
- State: Guerrero
- Municipal seat: San Luis Acatlán

Area
  - Total: 704.4 km^{2} (272.0 sq mi)

Population (2005)
  - Total: 41,884

San Luis Acatlán is a municipality in the Mexican state of Guerrero. The municipal seat lies at San Luis Acatlán. The municipality covers an area of 704.4 km^{2}.

As of 2005, the municipality had a total population of 41,884.

== History ==
The town gained municipality status jurisdicción municipal in 1850 while Juan N. Alvarez was in power. The municipality was originally named San Luis Allende but was changed to the current name in 1883. In 1944, it became the seat of the District of Altamirano. It borders the municipalities of Zapotitlán Tablas, Tecoanapa, Malinaltepec Metlatonoc, Azoyú, Igualapa, Cuautepec, and Ayutla de los Libres.

== The municipality ==
San Luis Acatlán is the governing authority for the following communities:

Los Achotes, Arroyo Cumiapa, Arroyo Mixtecolapa (Mixtecolapa), Rancho Calixto, Buena Vista, El Carmen, Cuanacaxtitlán, Pueblo Hidalgo, Horcasitas (Atotonilco de Horcasitas), Jicamaltepec de la Montaña, Jolotichán, Loma Bonita, El Mesón, Miahuichán, Pascala del Oro, Piedra Ancha, Piedra Quebrada, Potrerillo Coapinole, Poza Verde, Río Iguapa, Zentixtlahuaca, Tlaxcalixtlahuaca, Yoloxóchitl, Rancho Zacatecomate, Llano Guaje, El Recodo, Tuxtepec (Cofradía), Pajarito Chiquito, Xihuitepec, Pajarito Grande (Pájaro Grande), Cerro Zapote, Llano Silleta, Coyul (Coyul Chiquito), Rancho Rivera (La Huerta Rivera), La Guadalupe, Jicamaltepec (El Mango), Camalotillo (El Camalotillo), Hondura Tigre, Cerro Limón, Nejapa, El Pipe, El Tejoruco (El Zapote), Inés Carranza Oropeza, Rancho los Limos, Arroyo de Faisán, Arroyo Hoja de Venado, Cafetal Escondido, Pie de Cabra, Barrio el Barrero, Rancho el Cuajilote (El Cuajilote), Arroyo Limón (Arroyo Lima), Cacalutla (Paso Cacalutla), Paraje Ocotero Santa Cruz (Paraje Santa Cruz), Arroyo Mamey (Plan de Mamey), El Mamey (Plan del Mamey), Atotonilco, El Manguito, Mixtecapa, Tecomazuche (Pie de la Hamaca), Cerro Cantón, Rancho Andraca, Huerta Darío Pastrana, Barrio de Guadalupe, Cruz Alta, Llano de Maguey, Barrio Guadalupe, Arroyo del Mango, El Recodo Dos, San José de Cacalutla, Tierra Colorada, Pie de Tierra Blanca (Tierra Blanca), Cuadrilla de la Parota, Plan la Tejería (El Mesón Viejo), Tierra Azul (Barranca Tierra Azul), Arroyo Limón, Cuatro Caminos, El Zacatón, Loma de Parota, Palo de Tehuaje, Piedra Grande, Tejoruco, Altepec, Rancho Javier Hernández, Colonia San Marcos, Tuxtepec, El Llanito, El Mirador, El Paraíso and Renacimiento as well as 215 unnamed settlements.

These communities have a total population of 41,884 and constitute 704.40 km² of territory.

== Economy ==
Most of the municipality's economy is based on agriculture and livestock, growing, beans, sesame seeds, hibiscus flowers and peanuts using traditional farming techniques. Livestock includes cattle, goats, pigs, sheep, donkeys, horses, birds and bees, also done traditionally. Industrial activity is also based on food production such as the making of tortillas, but hats and some machinery are produced as well. Some coffee is processed here for export. In the highlands of the municipality, a number of communities survive by logging.
