= Iliatenco (municipality) =

Municipality in the Mexican state of Guerrero

- Municipality
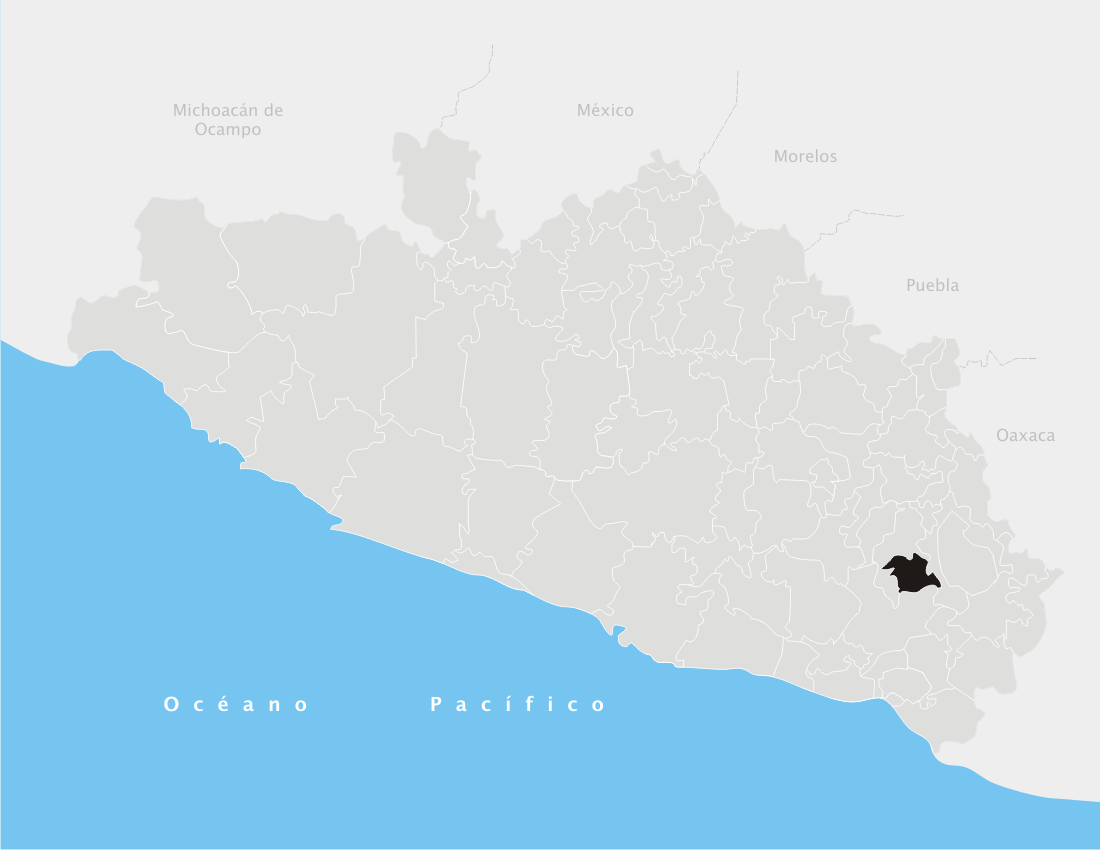
- Iliatenco in Guerrero

- Location in Mexico
- Coordinates: 18°13′N 99°29′W
- Country: Mexico
- State: Guerrero
- Municipal seat: Iliatenco

Population (2005)
  - Total: 10,039

Iliatenco is a municipality in the Mexican state of Guerrero. The municipal seat lies at Iliatenco. In 2005, the municipality had a total population of 10,039 and is the newest of municipalities in Guerrero, formed in 2005.
