= Alpoyeca (municipality) =

Municipality in the Mexican state of Guerrero

- Municipality
- Coat of arms

- Location in Mexico
- Coordinates: 17°32′N 98°01′W
- Country: Mexico
- State: Guerrero
- Municipal seat: Alpoyeca

Area
  - Total: 155.4 km^{2} (60.0 sq mi)

Population (2005)
  - Total: 5,848

Alpoyeca is a municipality in the Mexican state of Guerrero, being the smallest municipality in Guerrero. The eponymous municipal seat is Alpoyeca. The municipality covers an area of 155.4 km^{2}.

In 2005, the municipality had a total population of 5,848.
