= Atlamajalcingo del Monte =

City in the Mexican state of Guerrero

- Municipal seat and city
- Location in Mexico Atlamajalcingo del Monte (Mexico)
- Coordinates: 17°18′57″N 98°36′21″W
- Country: Mexico
- State: Guerrero
- Municipality: Atlamajalcingo del Monte

Atlamajalcingo del Monte is a city and seat of the municipality of Atlamajalcingo del Monte, in the state of Guerrero, southern Mexico.
