= Tlacoapa (municipality) =

Municipality in the Mexican state of Guerrero

- Municipality
- Location in Mexico
- Coordinates: 17°03′N 98°34′W
- Country: Mexico
- State: Guerrero
- Municipal seat: Tlacoapa

Area
  - Total: 326.3 km^{2} (126.0 sq mi)

Population (2010)
  - Total: 9,967

Tlacoapa is a municipality in the Mexican state of Guerrero. The municipal seat lies at Tlacoapa. The municipality covers an area of 326.3 km^{2}.

In 2010, the municipality had a total population of 9,967.
