= Malinaltepec =

City in the Mexican state of Guerrero

- Municipal seat and city
- Location in Mexico Malinaltepec (Mexico)
- Coordinates: 17°3′N 98°40′W
- Country: Mexico
- State: Guerrero
- Municipality: Malinaltepec

Area
  - Total: 492 km^{2} (190 sq mi)
- Elevation: 1,520 m (4,990 ft)

Population (2005)
  - Total: 26,613
  - Density: 54.1/km^{2} (140/sq mi)
- Time zone: UTC-6 (Zona Centro)
- Postal Code: 12041

Malinaltepec is a city and seat of the municipality of Malinaltepec, in the Mexican state of Guerrero.
