= Tlalixtaquilla (municipality) =

Municipality in the Mexican state of Guerrero

Tlalixtaquilla de Maldonado
- Municipality
- Location in Mexico
- Coordinates: 17°29′N 98°14′W
- Country: Mexico
- State: Guerrero
- Municipal seat: Tlalixtaquilla

Area
  - Total: 331.5 km^{2} (128.0 sq mi)

Population (2005)
  - Total: 6,534

Tlalixtaquilla de Maldonado is a municipality in the Mexican state of Guerrero. The municipal seat lies at Tlalixtaquilla. The municipality covers an area of 331.5 km^{2}.

In 2005, the municipality had a total population of 6534.
