= Metlatónoc =

City in the Mexican state of Guerrero

- Municipal seat and city
- Location in Mexico Metlatónoc (Mexico)
- Coordinates: 17°11′38″N 98°24′33″W
- Country: Mexico
- State: Guerrero
- Municipality: Metlatónoc
- Time zone: UTC-6 (Zona Centro)

Metlatónoc is a city and the seat of the municipality of Metlatónoc, in the southern Mexican state of Guerrero.
