= Metlatónoc (municipality) =

Municipality in the Mexican state of Guerrero

- Municipality
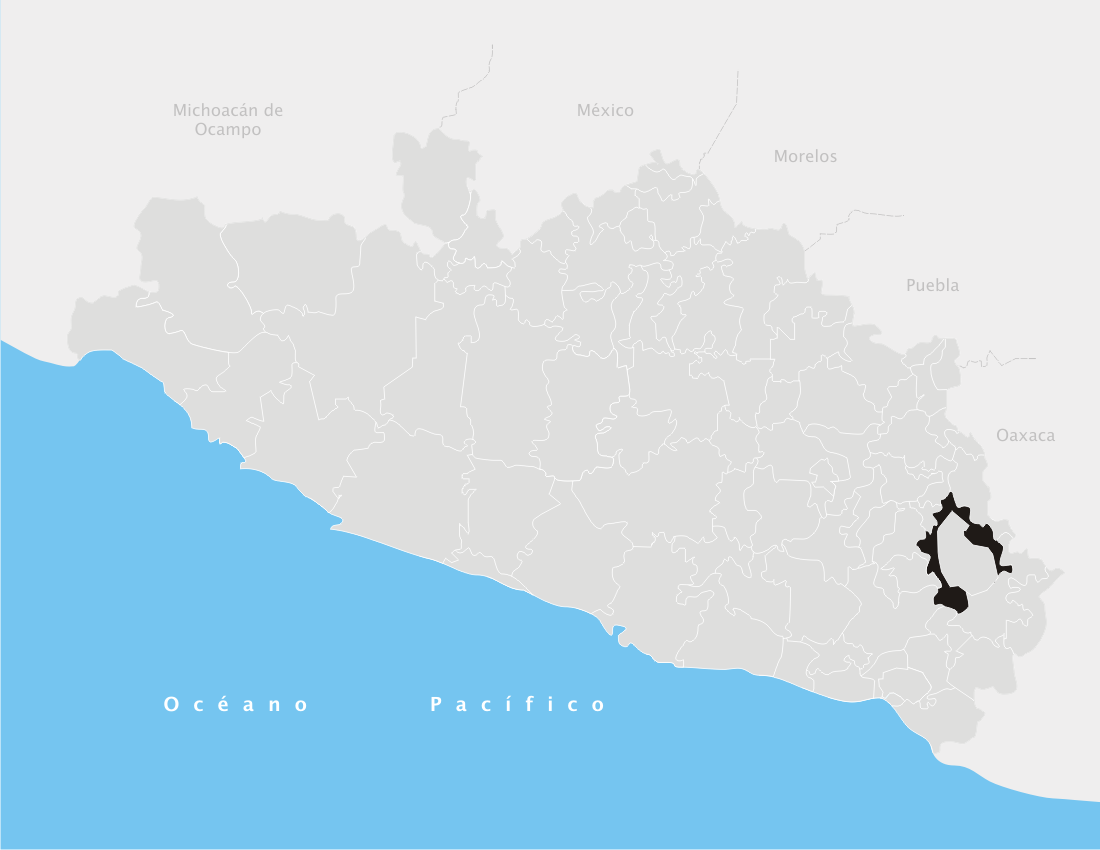
- Municipality of Metlatonoc in Guerrero

- Location in Mexico
- Coordinates: 17°12′N 98°24′W
- Country: Mexico
- State: Guerrero
- Municipal seat: Metlatónoc

Area
  - Total: 1,367.8 km^{2} (528.1 sq mi)

Population (2005)
  - Total: 17,398

Metlatónoc is a municipality in the Mexican state of Guerrero. The municipality covers an area of 1367.8 km^{2}.

As of 2005, the municipality had a total population of 17,398.

The municipality has one of the most distinctive shapes in Mexico, that of a horseshoe.
