= Xochistlahuaca (municipality) =

Municipality in the Mexican state of Guerrero

Xochistlahuaca Municipality
- Municipality
- Location in Mexico
- Coordinates: 16°43′N 98°02′W
- Country: Mexico
- State: Guerrero
- Municipal seat: Xochistlahuaca

Area
  - Total: 321.1 km^{2} (124.0 sq mi)

Population (2005)
  - Total: 25,180

Xochistlahuaca Municipality is a municipality in the Mexican state of Guerrero and is the easternmost municipality in Guerrero. The municipal seat lies at Xochistlahuaca. The municipality covers an area of 321.1 km^{2}.

As of 2005, the municipality had a total population of 25,180.

== The municipality ==
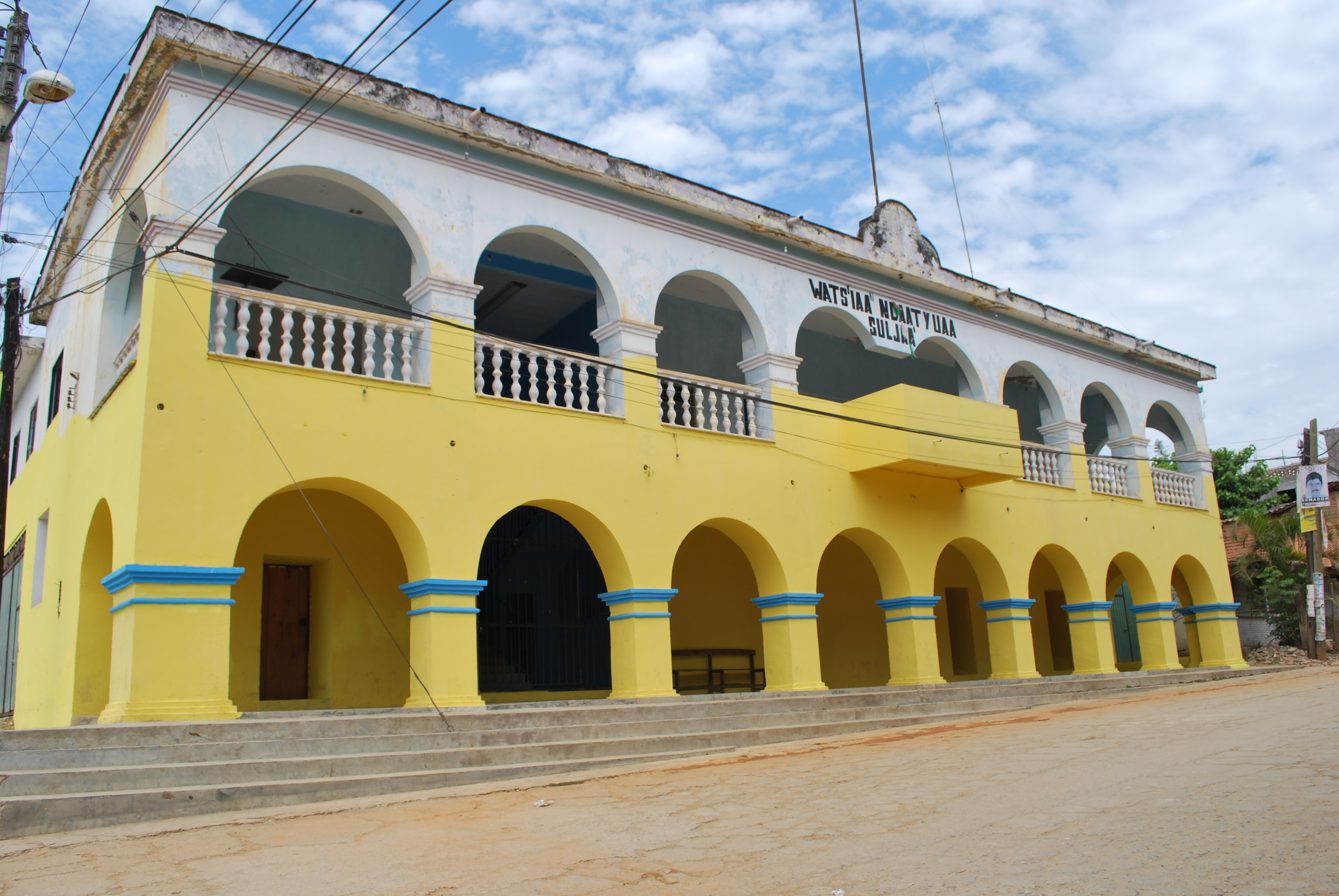
Municipal palace

As seat, the town of Xochistlahuaca is the local government of 103 communities which cover a territory of 430 km^{2}. It borders the municipalities of Tlacoachistlahuaca and Ometepec with the state of Oaxaca to the south and east. The seal of the municipality has a flower called a "laja nido" in the center, along with geometric designs which represent the weaving of Amuzgo women. The municipal government has one municipal president, a "síndico" and six representatives called "regidors."

The municipality has 103 communities. The largest communities after the seat are Guadalupe Victoria, Los Lirios, El Carmen and Arroyo Grande. Other important communities include Plan Maguey, Cabeza de Arroyo Nuevo, Llano del Carmen, Los Lirios, El Santiago, Plan de Pierna, Plan Lagarto, Guadalupe Victoria, Tierra Colorada, Arroyo Gente, Linda Vista, Arroyo Guacamaya, Arroyo Pájaro, Arroyo Montaña, Piedra Pesada, La Ciénega, Cumbre de San José, Rancho del Cura, Arroyo Grande, Junta de Arroyo Grande, Rancho del Cura Ejido, Cerro Bronco, Crucero de Camino, Ma-nantial Mojarra, Colonia Renacimiento, Plan de los Muertos, Cabeza de Arroyo Caballo and Colonia Luis Donaldo Colosio.

The highway connecting the municipality with Ometepec, the region's commercial center, was built in 1995. However, most transportation along this road is controlled by a single group of truckers and bus drivers because of the investment needed to by a vehicle. Others must work with this group to transport.
