= Alcozauca de Guerrero (municipality) =

Municipality in the Mexican state of Guerrero

- Municipality
- Location in Mexico
- Coordinates: 17°27′N 98°23′W
- Country: Mexico
- State: Guerrero
- Municipal seat: Alcozauca de Guerrero

Population (2005)
  - Total: 16,237

Alcozauca de Guerrero is a municipality in the Mexican state of Guerrero. The municipal seat lies at Alcozauca de Guerrero. The municipality covers an area of 55,160 hectares.

As of 2005, the municipality had a total population of 16,237.

== Climate ==
Climate data for Alcozauca de Guerrero (1951–2010)
Month	Jan	Feb	Mar	Apr	May	Jun	Jul	Aug	Sep	Oct	Nov	Dec	Year
Record high °C (°F)	32.0 (89.6)	34.0 (93.2)	36.5 (97.7)	38.5 (101.3)	39.0 (102.2)	38.0 (100.4)	34.0 (93.2)	34.0 (93.2)	33.0 (91.4)	33.5 (92.3)	33.0 (91.4)	32.0 (89.6)	39.0 (102.2)
Mean daily maximum °C (°F)	27.4 (81.3)	28.9 (84.0)	31.1 (88.0)	32.3 (90.1)	32.1 (89.8)	29.4 (84.9)	27.7 (81.9)	27.7 (81.9)	27.4 (81.3)	27.6 (81.7)	27.7 (81.9)	27.1 (80.8)	28.9 (84.0)
Daily mean °C (°F)	18.0 (64.4)	19.3 (66.7)	21.3 (70.3)	23.1 (73.6)	23.9 (75.0)	22.7 (72.9)	21.5 (70.7)	21.4 (70.5)	21.4 (70.5)	20.6 (69.1)	19.4 (66.9)	18.0 (64.4)	20.9 (69.6)
Mean daily minimum °C (°F)	8.6 (47.5)	9.7 (49.5)	11.6 (52.9)	13.8 (56.8)	15.6 (60.1)	16.0 (60.8)	15.3 (59.5)	15.1 (59.2)	15.4 (59.7)	13.5 (56.3)	11.0 (51.8)	8.9 (48.0)	12.9 (55.2)
Record low °C (°F)	0.5 (32.9)	1.0 (33.8)	5.0 (41.0)	6.0 (42.8)	7.0 (44.6)	8.0 (46.4)	6.0 (42.8)	9.0 (48.2)	10.0 (50.0)	2.0 (35.6)	1.0 (33.8)	2.5 (36.5)	0.5 (32.9)
Average precipitation mm (inches)	10.7 (0.42)	3.9 (0.15)	6.8 (0.27)	20.9 (0.82)	58.9 (2.32)	178.5 (7.03)	193.2 (7.61)	199.2 (7.84)	164.9 (6.49)	80.6 (3.17)	12.2 (0.48)	3.8 (0.15)	933.6 (36.76)
Average precipitation days (≥ 0.1 mm)	0.9	0.7	1.0	2.4	6.4	15.8	18.3	18.8	16.7	8.2	1.5	0.5	91.2
Source: Servicio Meteorologico Nacional
