= Tlapa de Comonfort =

City in the Mexican state of Guerrero

Tlapa de Comonfort, Guerrero
- City
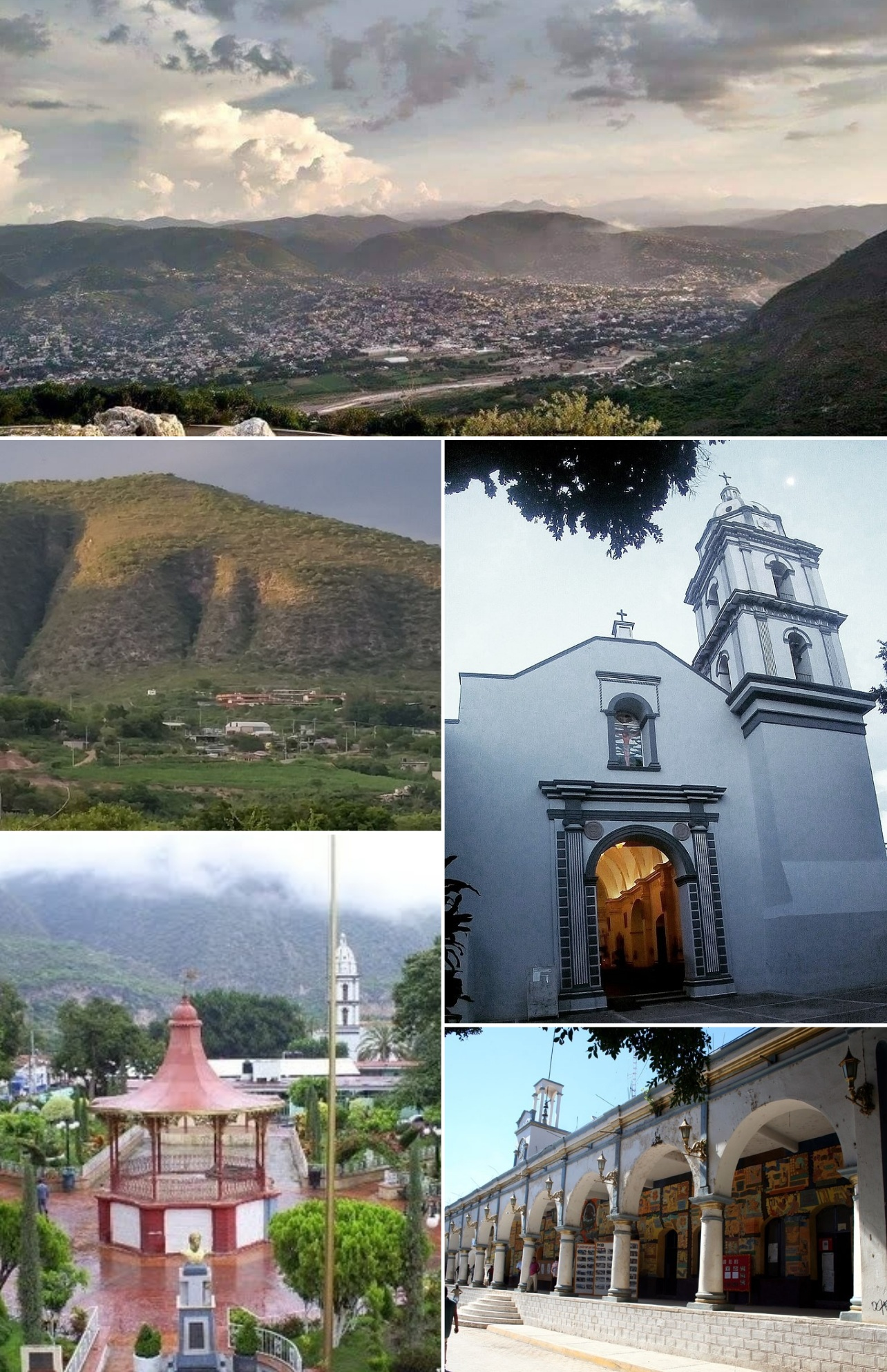
- Images of Tlapa

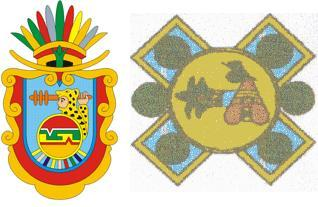
- Seal
- Nickname: Tlapa
- Location within Guerrero Location within Mexico
- Coordinates: 17°32′46″N 98°34′35″W
- Country: Mexico
- State: Guerrero
- Municipality: Tlapa de Comonfort

Government
  - Presidente Municipal: Martimiano Benítez Lorenzo
- Elevation: 1,100 m (3,600 ft)

Population (2020)
  - Total: 59,580
- Time zone: UTC-6 (Zona Centro)

Tlapa de Comonfort, often shortened to Tlapa and known as Tindaꞌi in Mixtec, is a city in the mountain region of the Mexican state of Guerrero. It also serves as the municipal seat for the surrounding municipality of the same name.

"Tlapa" is a Nahuatl exonym from tlappan or tluhpan, meaning "place of washing". The "de Comonfort" part of the name is in homage to President Ignacio Comonfort.

== History ==
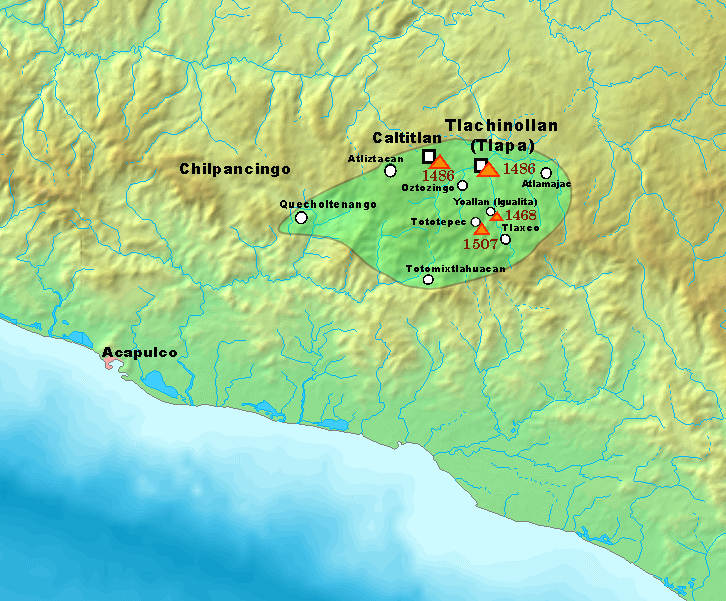
The Kingdom of Tlachinollan at its greatest extent

The Codex Azoyú attests to the existence of the late postclassic kingdom of Tlachinollan in this area, which was ruled by both Mixtecs and Tlapanec-Nahuas in dual lineages based in Tlachinollan and Caltitlán. It existed as early as 1300 AD, and beginning in 1349 progressively grew to cover much of what is now the Montaña region of the state of Guerrero, stretching as far as Totomixtlahuaca in the south and Quechultenango in the west. One factor motivating this expansion may have been the population growth in Central Mexico which resulted in increased demand for local goods. Conquered settlements retained their own rulers, who paid tribute and were considered vassals of the rulers at Tlachinollan. At its height, Tlachinollan constituted the largest indigenous polity ever based in Guerrero.

By the 1440s, Tlachinollan was dealing with the effects of a wave of Nahua migrants coming from the north, separate from the Aztec Empire. The area was subject to an Aztec invasion during the reign of Tizoc, but according to Fernando de Alva Cortés Ixtlilxóchitl it was definitively conquered after a joint campaign in 1486 led by Ahuitzotl, Nezahualpilli, and Chimalpopoca (Tlacopan). Tlachinollan was subsequently renamed to Tlapan and became an Aztec garrison and capital of a tributary province roughly corresponding to the territorial extent of the former kingdom. Gold was one of the most important tribute products given by Tlapan to the Aztecs, along with cotton clothing, warrior costumes, and tecomates for cacao.

References to Tlapa exist in codices and wood carvings from the town of Chiepetlán, claiming it was founded in 1607, and in the Humboldt Codex.

The municipality was founded in 1912, with the excision of Guerrero from the states of Puebla and México. It received city status in 1920.

== Modern day ==
The 2005 INEGI Census reported a population of 37,975 in the municipal seat. The current mayor is Victoriano Wences of the PT.

== Geography ==
- 17°32′46″N 98°34′35″W
- 1,100 metres above sea level
