= Alcozauca de Guerrero =

City in the Mexican state of Guerrero

- Municipal seat and city
- Location in Mexico Alcozauca de Guerrero (Mexico)
- Coordinates: 17°17′N 98°29′W
- Country: Mexico
- State: Guerrero
- Municipality: Alcozauca de Guerrero

Population (2020)
  - Total: 3,115
- INEGI code: 120040001

Alcozauca de Guerrero is a city and seat of the municipality of Alcozauca de Guerrero, in the state of Guerrero, southern Mexico.
