= Costa Chica of Guerrero =

Coastal area in Guerrero, Mexico

Coordinates: 16°47′38.48″N 98°59′52.09″W

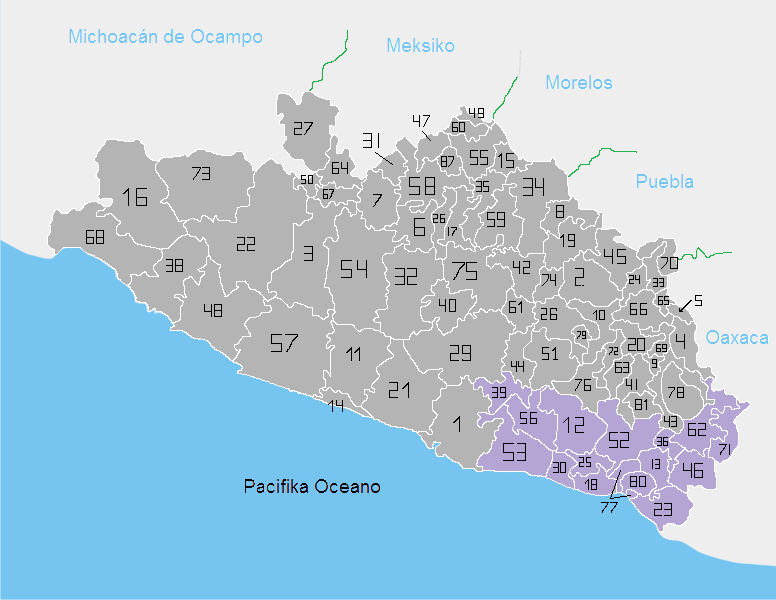
Location of the Costa Chica region in Guerrero

The Costa Chica de Guerrero (Spanish for "small coast of Guerrero") is an area along the south coast of the state of Guerrero, Mexico, extending from just south of Acapulco to the Oaxaca border. Geographically, it consists of part of the Sierra Madre del Sur, a strip of rolling hills that lowers to coastal plains to the Pacific Ocean. Various rivers here form large estuaries and lagoons that host various species of commercial fish.

This area is paired with the Costa Chica of Oaxaca as both have significant populations of Afro-Mexicans. The Afro-Mexican presence in Guerrero is strongest in this region, especially in the coastal municipalities from Marquelia to Cuajinicuilapa. Another important ethnic group is the Amuzgo, who are by far the largest indigenous ethnicity in the region, in the municipalities of Xochistlahuaca, Tlacoachistlahuaca and Ometepec. The Amuzgo, especially in Xochistlahuca, still wear traditional clothing and speak the Amuzgo language. Many women still weave cloth on backstrap looms. The region is one of the poorest in Mexico, with an economy based on subsistence agriculture and fishing, with some commerce, especially along Highway 200, which parallels the coast.

== Geography ==
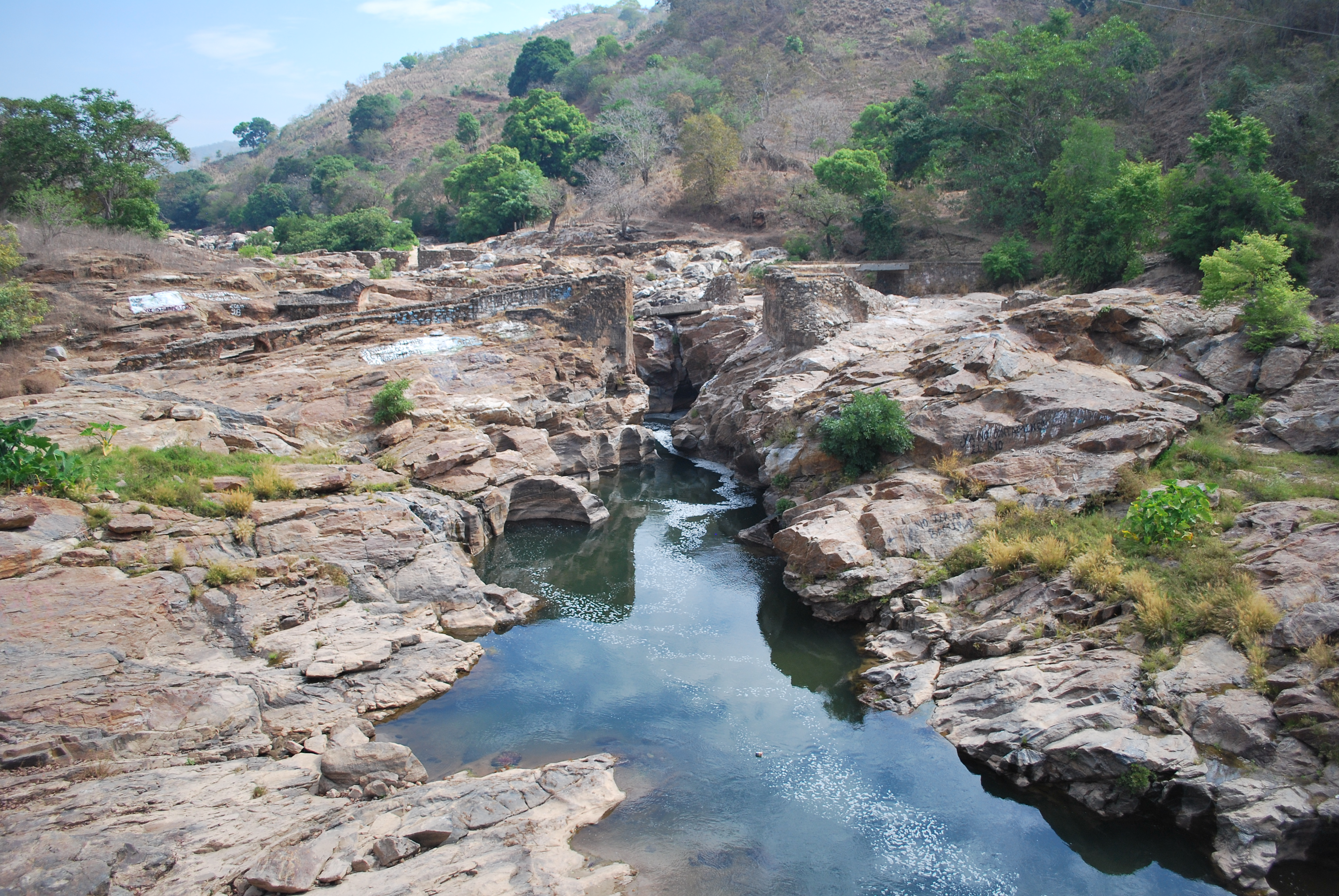
Ravine in the mountains of Xochistlahuaca

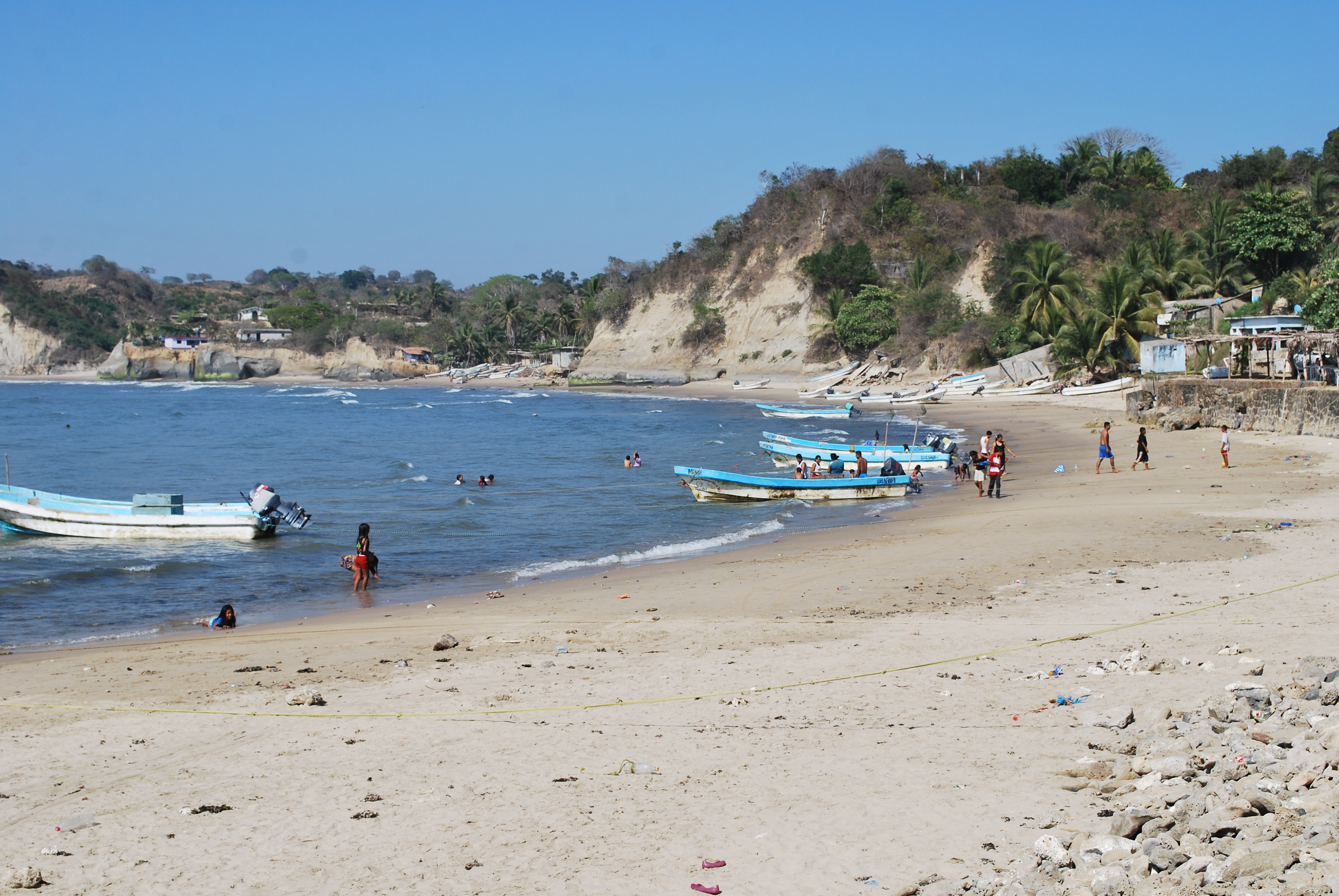
View of the beach at Punta Maldonado - El Faro

The Costa Chica of Guerrero is a coastal region beginning just southeast of Acapulco, and ending at the Oaxaca state border to the south. It is culturally paired with the Costa Chica of Oaxaca as both have significant populations of Afro-Mexicans, who often also have indigenous ancestry.

The Costa Chica is one of the seven regions of the state along with Zona Norte, Tierra Caliente, Centro, La Montaña, Acapulco and Costa Grande. The largest metropolitan area of the region is San Marcos. There are fifteen municipalities in the region: Ayutla, Azoyú, Copala, Cuautepec, Florencio Villarreal, Igualapa, Ometepec, San Luis Acatlán, San Marcos, Tecoanapa, Tlacoachistlahuaca, Xochistlahuaca, Cuajinicuilapa, Marquelia and Juchitán.

Most of the terrain is dominated by the Sierra Madre del Sur as it parallels the coast. Between the mountains and the ocean is a narrow strip of hilly land called the Lomérios de la Vertiente del Pacífico and coastal plains called the Planicies Costeras. The region is filled with winding rivers which empty into the Pacific. The vegetation is deciduous low height tropical forest that loses most of its leaves during the dry season from November to May. Oceanside municipalities include San Marcos, Florencio Villarreal, Copala, Marquelia and Cuajinicuilapa. The three main lagoons are Tecomate, Chautengo and Tres Palos. The largest bay is the Bay of Puerto Marques next to Acapulco.

The area has a hot climate that reaches an average high temperature of 32C. The dry season extends from November to May and a rainy season from June to October. The area is prone to cyclones from June to October. In 1997, Hurricane Pauline devastated the Costa Chica in both Guerrero and Oaxaca with winds reaching between 166 and 200 km/h. The toll was 120 dead, and 8,700 other victims. The region was left with partially destroyed roads with left a number of communities physically isolated for days.

== Afro-Mexican community ==
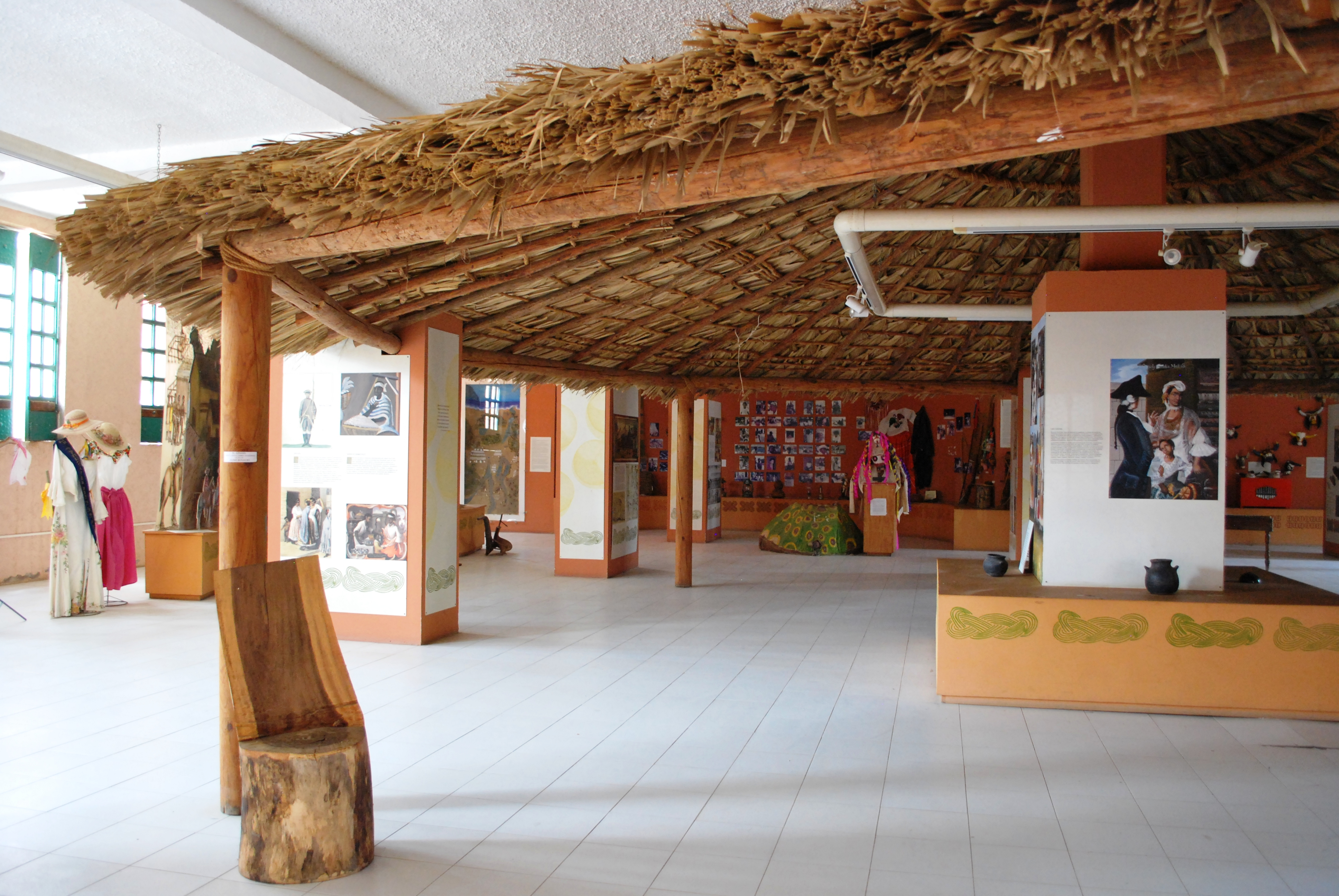
View inside the Museo de las Culturas Afromestizas

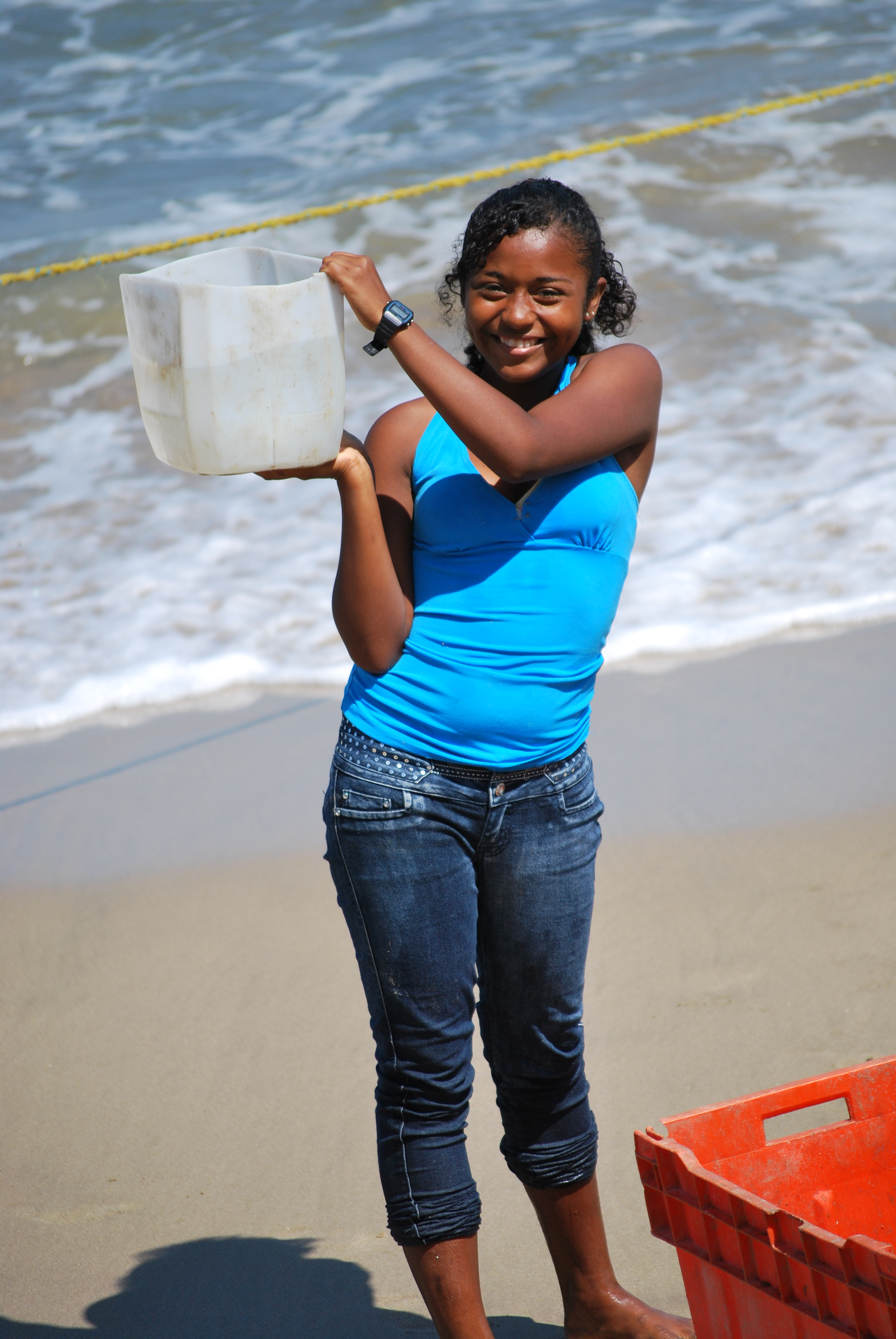
Afro-Mexican girl at Punta Maldonado

The Costa Chica (of both Guerrero and Oaxaca) is one of two zones in Mexico with significant Afro-Mexican populations, with the other being in the state of Veracruz. While Afro-Mexicans are found in most parts of the Costa Chica, the highest concentrations in Guerrero are found between Marquelia and Cuajinicuilapa. Members of this group in the region are often identified by skin color. Some consider the classification to be racism, while others identify as primarily Afro-Mexican. Many also have indigenous or mestizo ancestry. While Africans are described as the “third root,” along with indigenous and Spanish people as part of Mexico heritage, this has often been "forgotten” in the description of the “mestizaje” identity of Mexico, which stresses the mixture of European and indigenous peoples.

After the Spanish conquest of the Aztec Empire, disease, war and overwork killed part of the native population. In a number of areas, the Spanish brought in African slaves to replace the lost labor. Juan Garrido, one of numerous African conquistadors, accompanied Hernán Cortés in Mexico in 1519. During the colonial period, there was a significant African slave population. Large quantities of slaves were imported starting in the mid-1500s and by 16th and 17th centuries. The first Africans brought to the Pacific coast arrived to Acapulco brought by Spanish galleons. Many later arrivals included escaped black slaves, called “cimarrones” who found refuge in the area. However, most local stories about how Africans arrived to the area have to do with local shipwrecks, whether it was a slave ship or not. All end with the idea that they found freedom and refuge in the communities along the coast. Due to the isolation of the area and their desire to keep their freedom, little was written about their history.

The historic Afro-Mexican communities were known for building round mud huts with thatched roofs, the design of which can be traced back to what are now Ghana and the Ivory Coast. Few of these traditional structures remain; over time, the people adopted local customs. Today, Afro-Mexican culture does not have its own language or dress. It is sometimes distinguished by body language and vocabulary, as well as a shared heritage.

The culture was featured in a documentary called Santa Negritud by La Maga Films sponsored by Susana Harp . The history and culture of these people is also the focus of a museum in Cuajinicuilapa, called the Museo de las Culturas Afromestizas .

== Amuzgos and other indigenous ==
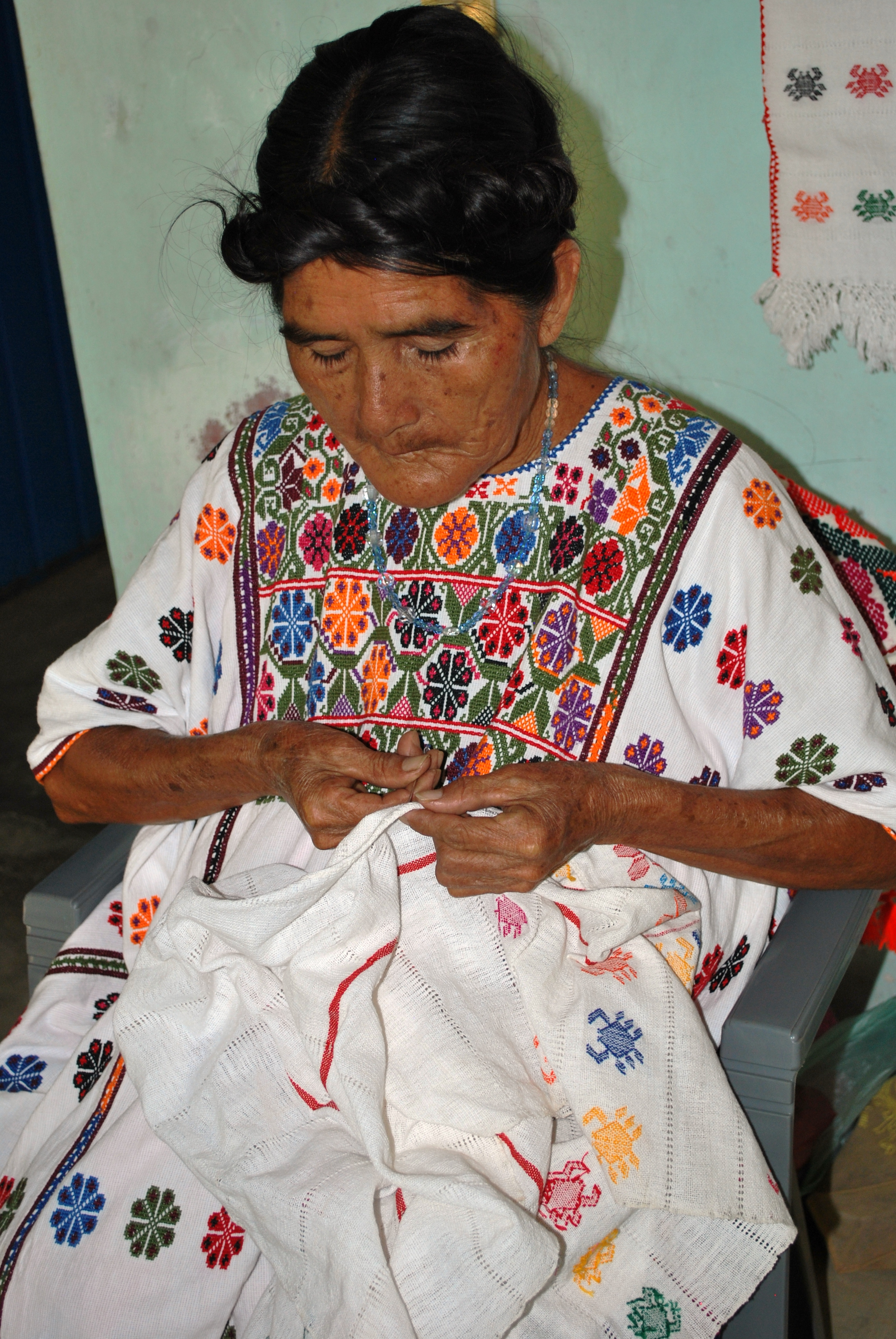
Amugzo woman piecing cloth together to make a huipil.

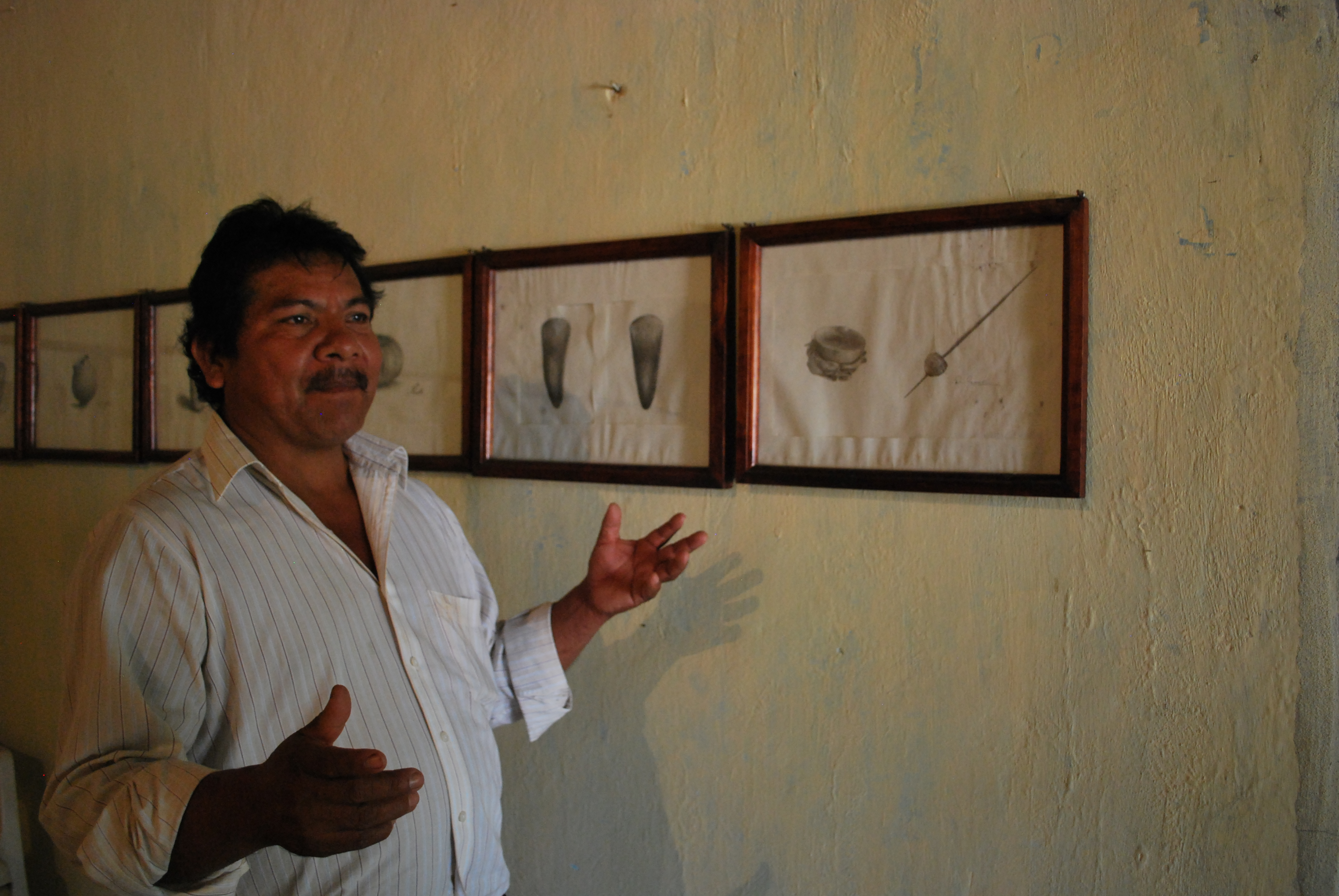
Ireneo Santanna, director of the Amuzgo Community Museum in Xochistlahuaca

Indigenous peoples of the area include the Amuzgo, Mixtec, Tlapanec and Nahuas. The Amuzgo are the most numerous by far, followed by the Mixtec, who are mostly found in Tlacoachistlahuaca. Historically the indigenous peoples associated the African slaves with the Spanish. The colonists sometimes used the slaves to execute indigenous people. Most indigenous and Afro Mexicans live in separate communities or separate neighborhoods of the same community. However, the separation is not absolute, as there have been marriages between indigenous and Afro Mexicans.

The Amuzgo live in the border region of Guerrero and Oaxaca, near the Pacific Coast. Municipalities with the largest Amuzgo population in order are Xochistlahuaca, Tlacoachistlahuaca, Ometepec in Guerrero and San Pedro Amuzgos in Oaxaca. Census figures put the Amuzgo speaking population at about 35,000, but ethnic studies put the number at about 50,000, with about eighty percent living in the state of Guerrero. The Amuzgo language belongs to the Oto-Manguean family, most closely related to the Mixtecan sub-family.

The origin of the Amuzgo is unknown. One theory states that the group migrated to its current location from the north from the area of the Pánuco River. Another states that they migrated from South America. Amuzgo folklore states that they came from islands in the sea. The Amuzgo also populated the coast but Mixtec expansion, the Spanish conquest, and later African migration pushed them into the mountains. One interpretation of the name “Amuzgo” is from Nahuatl, meaning “place of books,” probably indicating that the region had administrative functions. The name of the language in Amuzgo is ñomnda (word of water). The name of the people is nnánncue (people in the middle).

There is important traditional textile production among the Amuzgos, along with ceramics, leather, cheese and piloncillo. Most surplus products are sold in Ometepec. Traditional weaving is done on a backstrap loom, and girls learn the process starting from when they are about six or seven years old. The most traditional garments are made from a local cotton called coyuche, which is grown, cleaned, spun, dyed then woven. The most notable and time-consuming garment is the women's huipil, which has, at times, very complicated designs woven into it. A number of Amuzgo weavers have been recognized for their work, including Florentina López de Jesús. Many Amuzgos in Guerrero still wear traditional garments, with men wearing loose white cotton pants and shirt and the women wearing a huipil and dress. However, those made with commercial cloth are becoming more common.

== History ==
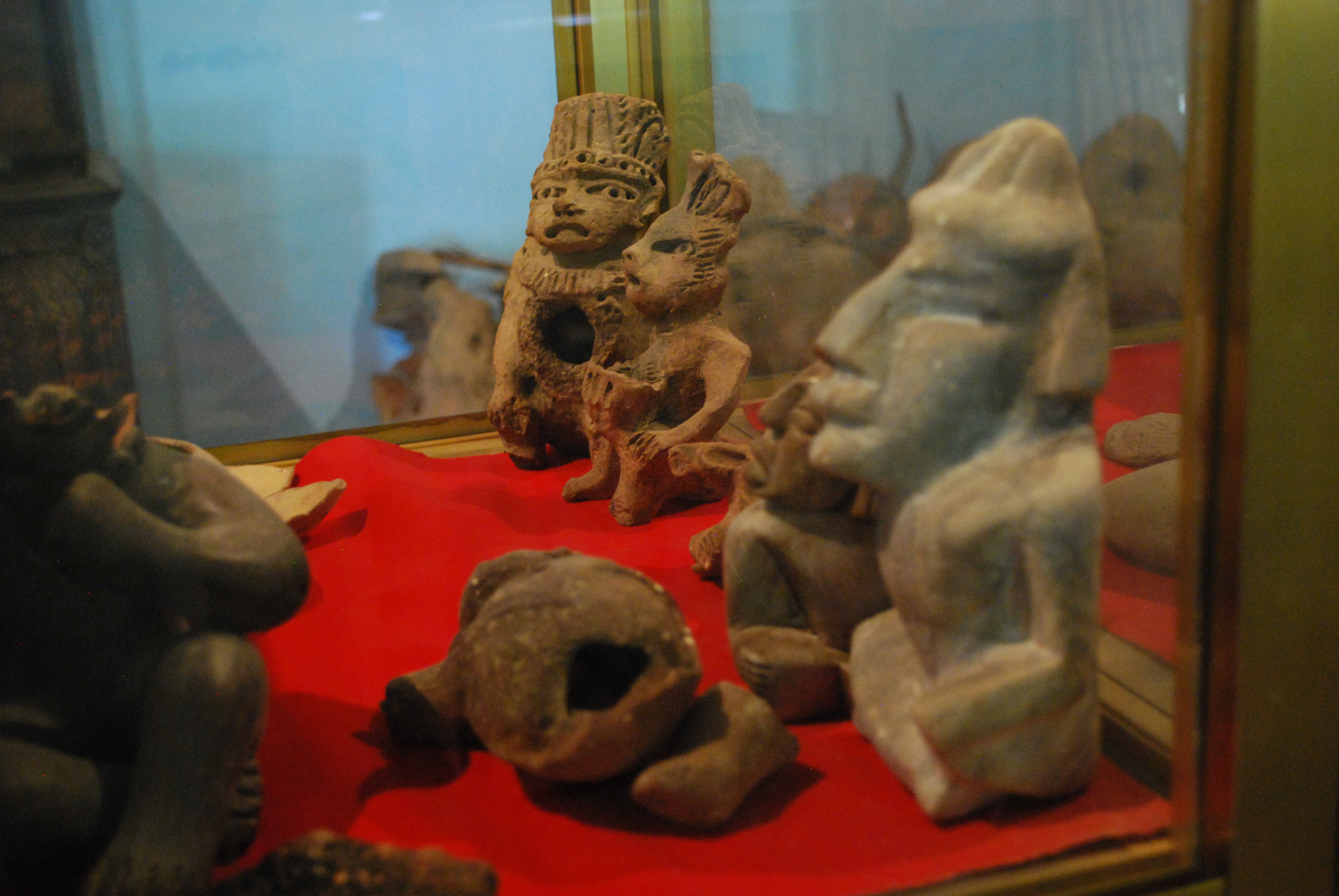
Archeological pieces at the Xochistlahuaca Community Museum

Archeological excavation in the region has been spotty with only preliminary evaluation starting from the 1930s, so information on the pre Hispanic history of this area is limited. Sites have been identified in the municipalities of Azoyú, Juchitán, Marquelia, Ometepec, San Luis Acatlán and Tecoanapa. Highland sites include Piedra Labrada, Los Zapotales, La Mira, Arcelia del Progreso and Yoloxóchitl all above 650 meters above sea level. Hill sites include Capulín Chocolate, El Pericón, Tecuantepec, El Limón, Horcasitas, Chinantla, San Luis Acatlán and Zoyatlán. Those by the ocean are generally near the mouths of rivers and include Las Arenillas and El Alto. Horcasitas and San Luis Acatlán are notable because they are built on natural elevations to avoid seasonal flooding from the San Luis River.

Arcelia del Progreso, Marquelia and Yoloxóchitl show Olmec influence. Much of the region was part of a Mixtec province called Ayacastla, which had its capital in Igualapa and also included Ometepec, Azoyú, Quahuitlan (now Cahuitán), and the extinct settlement of Tlacolula. In addition to the four found today, there were other indigenous groups, such as the Yopenahuatlec in what is now Marquelia, but they disappeared over the colonial period as the indigenous population markedly declined. Ayacastla, Huehuetán, Quahuitlan and the extinct villages of Cintla and Cuauhtzapotla each had their own unattested languages, referred to respectively as Ayacastec, Huehuetec, Quahutec, Cintec, and Zapotec (most likely unrelated to the Zapotec languages of Oaxaca).

During the Spanish conquest of the Aztec Empire, Pedro de Alvarado conquered the area in 1522, founding the town of Acatlán the same year. In 1531, a Tlapanec uprising forced most of the Spanish residents to flee. During the rest of the 16th century, much of the indigenous population was decimated, primarily due to new infectious diseases carried by colonists; they also suffered from war and overwork. In Xochistlahuaca there were about 20,000 indigenous in 1522 but by 1582, only 200 survived.

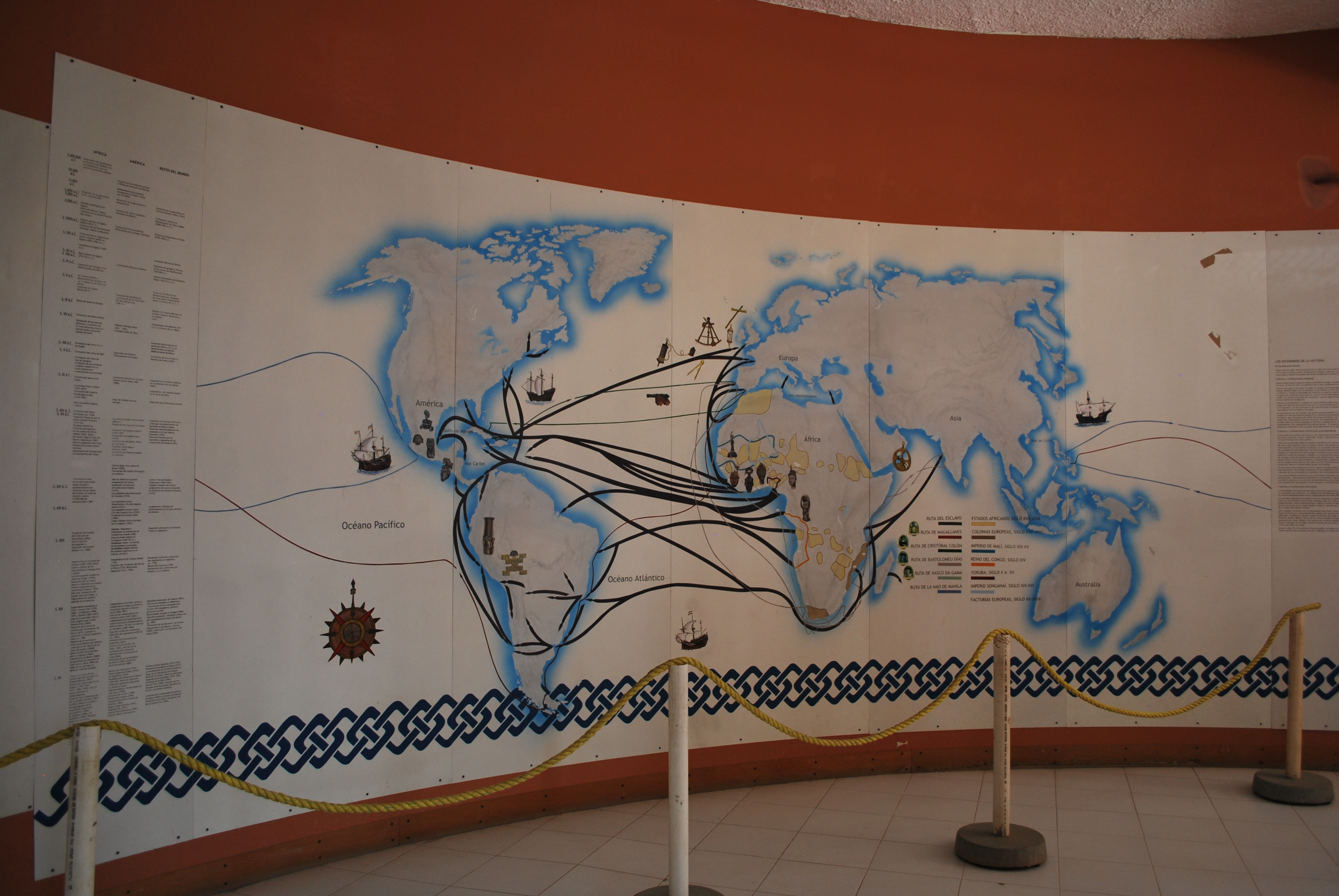
Map depicting the slave trade at the Museo de las Culturas Afromeztizas

The area was developed by colonists in the 16th century for ranching, and they imported slaves to help with the labor. They exported meat, hides and wool. Soon after, the area became inhabited by Africans and Afro-Mexicans. During the colonial period, the Spanish imported a total of about 200,000 African slaves from West Africa to Mexico over three centuries. Most were landed at Veracruz. Working on sugar plantations, in mines and in ranching, slaves who escaped migrated to the isolated Costa Chica region, where they found refuge.

Spanish landholders gave them protection in return for cheap labor, mostly tending cattle and curing leather. Over time, there was significant interracial mixing among Europeans, indigenous and Africans. Colonial authorities required slaves to convert to Catholicism. But, in smaller communities such as San Nicolas and Colorado, many Afro-Mexicans continued to use traditional magical practices to cure illness and resolve problems, often combining them with Catholic practice. Xochistlahuaca became an administrative and religious center in 1563, which it was during the height of the Mixtec people. It has remained an important religious center to this day.

In 1813, José María Morelos y Pavón came through the region, entering from Oaxaca to take the area during the Mexican War of Independence on his way to Acapulco. At the end of the war, the region became part of the Capitanía General del Sur, with Vicente Guerrero, an Afro-Mexican, as its head. In 1824, the Ometepec area was part of the state of Puebla.

In 1878, the Casa Miller was founded in Cuajinicuilapa, which transformed the economy of the area. The enterprise consisted of a soap factory, the raising of cattle and the growing of cotton, on a total of about 125,000 hectares. Products were shipped from Tecoanapa to market.

During the colonial period, the Amuzgo and other indigenous had their land taken from them and were forced to pay rent where they lived. They began to fight to take the land back in 1920, which resulted in the establishment of an Amuzgo ejido in 1933. Land redistribution in ejidos occurred in the 1930s. This ejido was recognized as the municipality of Xochistlahuaca in 1934.

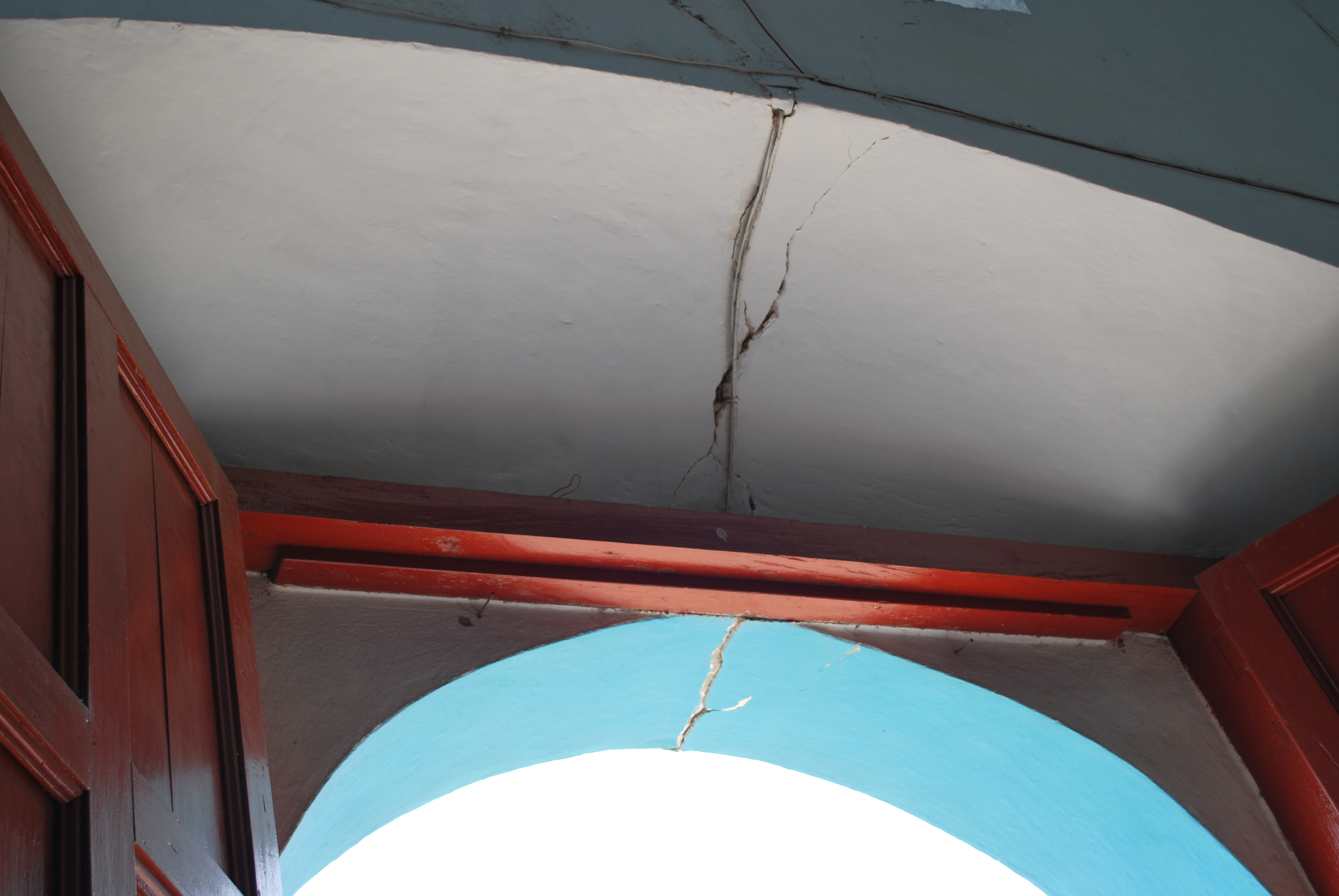
Cracks at the parish church in Xochistlahuaca from the 2012 quake

Highway 200, built through the region in the early 1960s, stimulated commercial development in the area, as it opened up transportation connections with other areas. With ease of travel, new residents were attracted to the region. Population growth precipitated the need to subdivide areas into new municipalities. Marquelia was made a municipality in 2002 and Juchitán became one in 2004.

The last major earthquake in the region occurred on 20 March 2012, and was 7.4 on the Richter scale. It was centered near Ometepec and was the strongest since the 1985 quake. It was preceded by at least 16 quakes of over 5.0 in the same spring. Municipalities in the region that suffered damage include Ometepec, Xochistlahuaca, Copala, Cruz Grande and Marquelia. Most of the serious damage from this quake occurred in the Costa Chica region, with over 900 homes made inhabitable.

From the late 20th century to the present, crime has been a problem for the region. There has been a growing problem with drug trafficking, despite the increased presence of military and federal police. Most municipalities do not have the resources to police the very rural, mostly indigenous areas. Communities have developed various citizen patrols and justice systems, which mostly mete out community service as punishment. Most of these have been legally recognized by local authorities.

Dengue and rotavirus are relatively common health problems in the region, as in the rest of the state.

== Culture and education ==
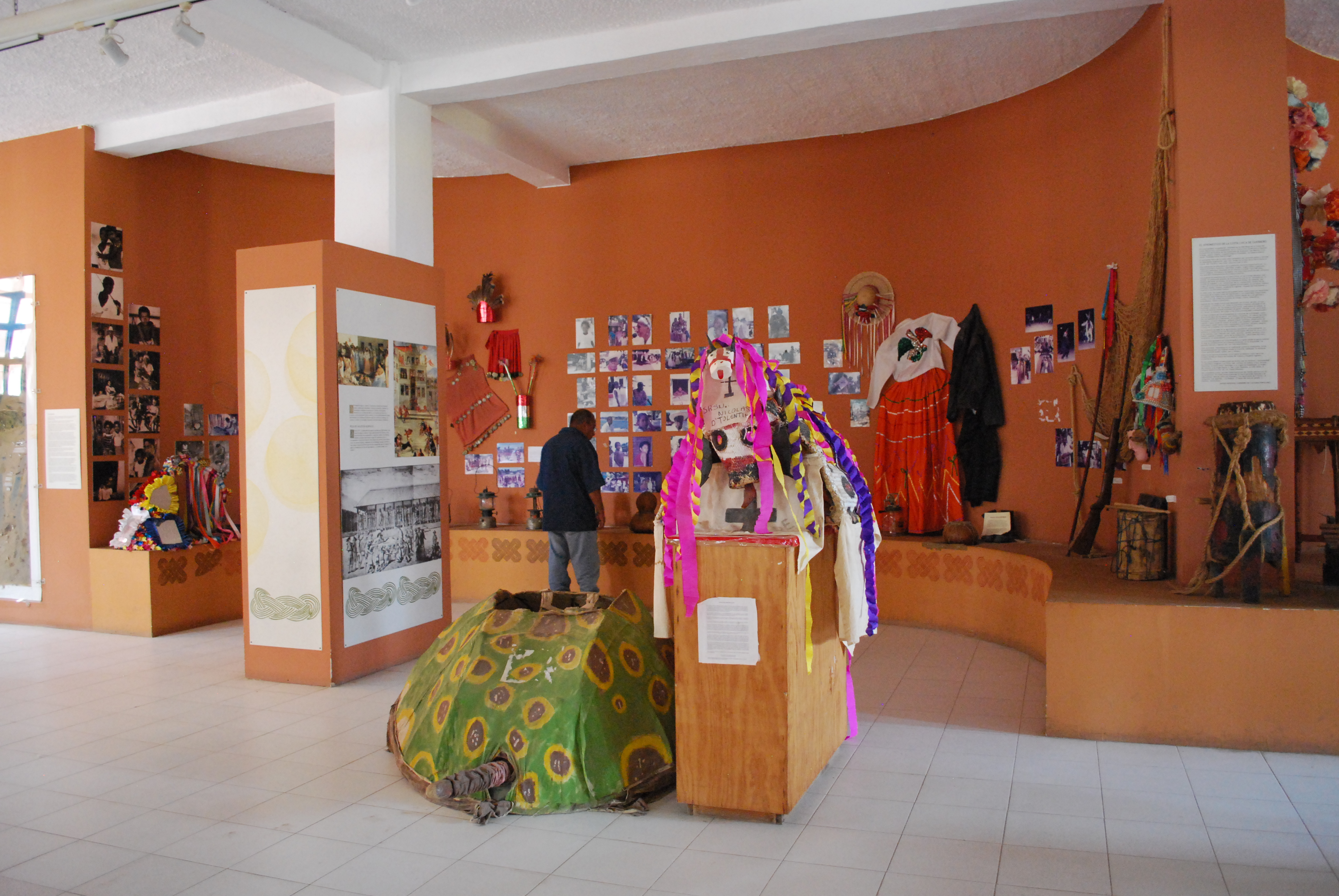
Display at the Museo de las Culturas Afromestizas with a "torito"

The Costa Chica has one of Mexico's unique music and dance traditions. Many of the songs and dances reflect the interethnic conflicts of the region over the centuries. One notable music and dance style is called “chilena,” characterized by a stomping dance with erotic movements with participants carrying handkerchiefs, part of Afro-Mexican as well as criollo culture. The songs have themes such as love, the environment, animals, politicians and religion. Another genre is called “artesa,” a type of fandango, which is performed in front of a type of an elongated wooden box fitted with a bull's head. It is also called El Torito, which involves the use of a bull-shaped frame on the center dancer with others around him. While the music plays, various couple step up onto the box to dance on it with vigor. The dance has been interpreted as a way to gain a kind of vengeance as the bull-box represents the Spanish.

Another important folk dance is called Los Diablos (The Devils), which is performed by a group of men in masks with long beards. The dancers are “encouraged” by assistants wielding leather whips. This is performed on 31 October in preparation for the national holiday of the Day of the Dead. These devils represent the underworld. Other traditional dances of the region include 'La Tortuga,' 'Los Doce Pares de Francia' and 'La Conquista.' These dances feature characters such as Hernán Cortés, Cuauhtémoc, Moctezuma and even Charlemagne and Turkish horsemen.

The region has an active corrido or ballad tradition. One type of corrido simultaneously glorifies and chastises “hombres bragado” (“ballsy men”) who risk their lives, often with violence, to defend local notions of honor and glory.

Magical practices, such as the use of amulets and more to cure sickness and other problems, are still found. These practices can be found particularly in very rural Afro-Mexican communities, such as San Nicolas and Colorado. Afro-mestiza culture does not have its own language and dress but it is distinguished by body language and vocabulary as well as a shared heritage. There have been efforts to strengthen and promote the African-descended culture of the Costa Chica. One of these is the establishment of the Museo de las Culturas Afromestizas.

As of 2000, about a quarter of the population of the Costa Chica region was illiterate. The municipality of Cuajinicuilapa having the highest rate at 30%. The government has worked for twenty years to try to improve education in the region.

== Economy ==
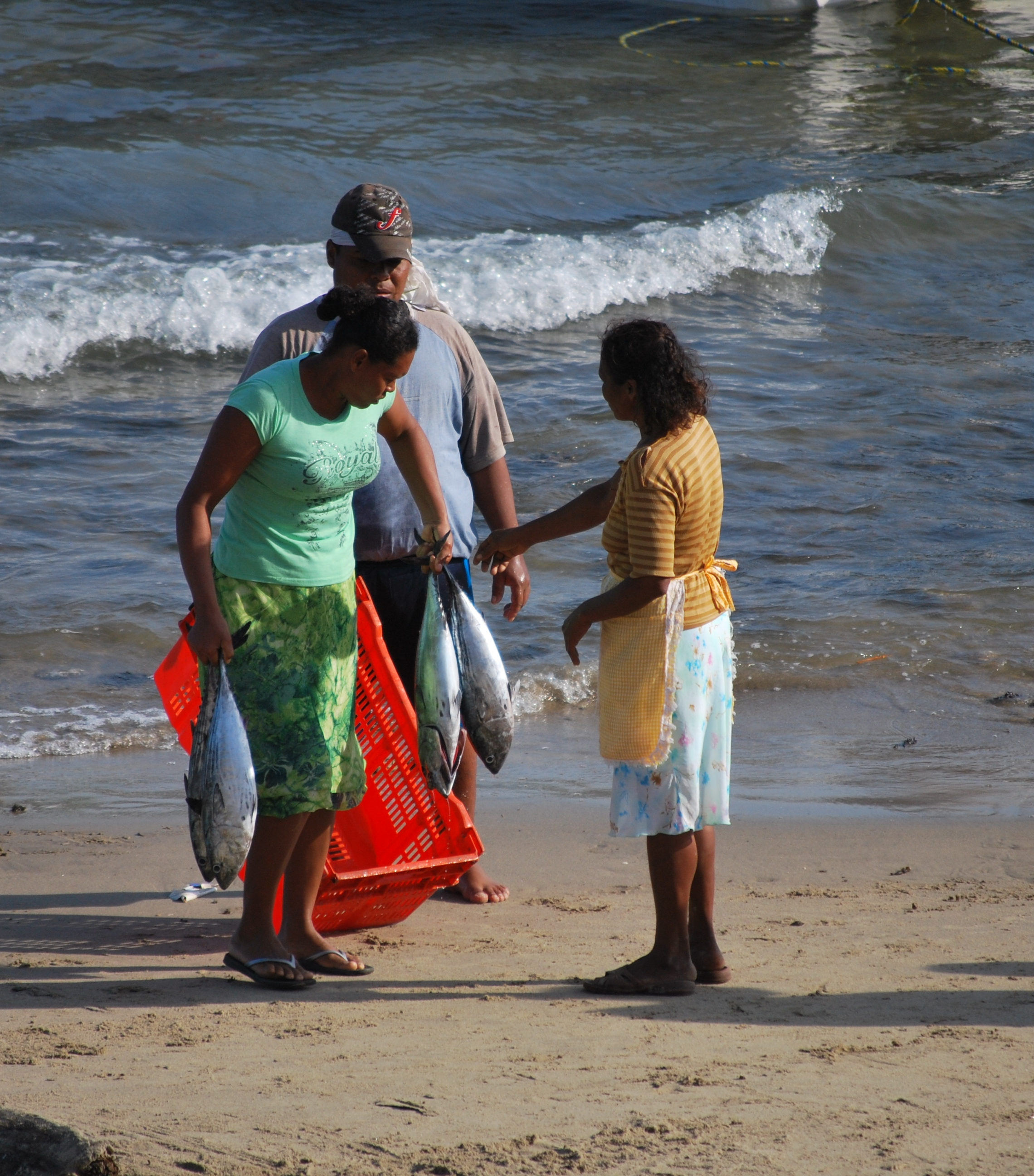
Residents of Punta Maldonada with freshly caught fish

The Costa Chica is characterized by high indices of socio-economic marginalization; it is one of the poorest regions in the state of Guerrero. Xochistlahuaca is the 4th-poorest municipality in Guerrero and the 16th-poorest in Mexico. Only 16% of homes have running water and drainage, and only 15% use gas for cooking. Only three percent of the population has access to government health care. Since the late 20th century, more men have migrated out of the region to find work, mostly in tourism centers in Guerrero, such as Acapulco, and some other states in Mexico. There is also some migration to the US, such as California, Chicago and North Carolina.

The main economic activities are agriculture, livestock and fishing, with corn being the most important crop, grown by households for their own consumption. One cash crop is hibiscus, which is sold locally and nationally, and another is sesame seed. Other common crops are coconut, mango, and some watermelon. In Xochistlahuaca and Tlacoachistlahuaca, the economy is based on agriculture. There is a small but growing commercialization of dairy products such as cheese to outside municipalities. Commerce in this area has been helped by the 1995 construction of highway linking Xochistlahuaca and Tlacoachistlahuaca with the regional commercial center of Ometepec. Marquelia has large expanses of coconut groves, whose fruit is mostly used to produce soap and oil.

There are fifteen main fishing communities, which capture various ocean and lagoon/estuary species. Thirteen of these are completely dependent on fishing, with San Marcos and Marquelia having other economic activities, such as commerce and services. Fishing communities are divided among those that principally fish in open ocean and those that fish in lagoons. Each community has at least one fishing cooperative. The fishing communities include San José Guatemala, Boca del Río, Colonia Juan Nepmuceno Álvarez, Barra de Copala, Marquilia, Playa La Bocana, Barra de Teconapa, Punta Maldonado, Nuevo Tecomulapa, Las Ramaditas, San Marcos, Pico del Monte and Las Peñas. The two locations with the most fishing activity area Barra de Tecoanapa and Punta Maldonado.

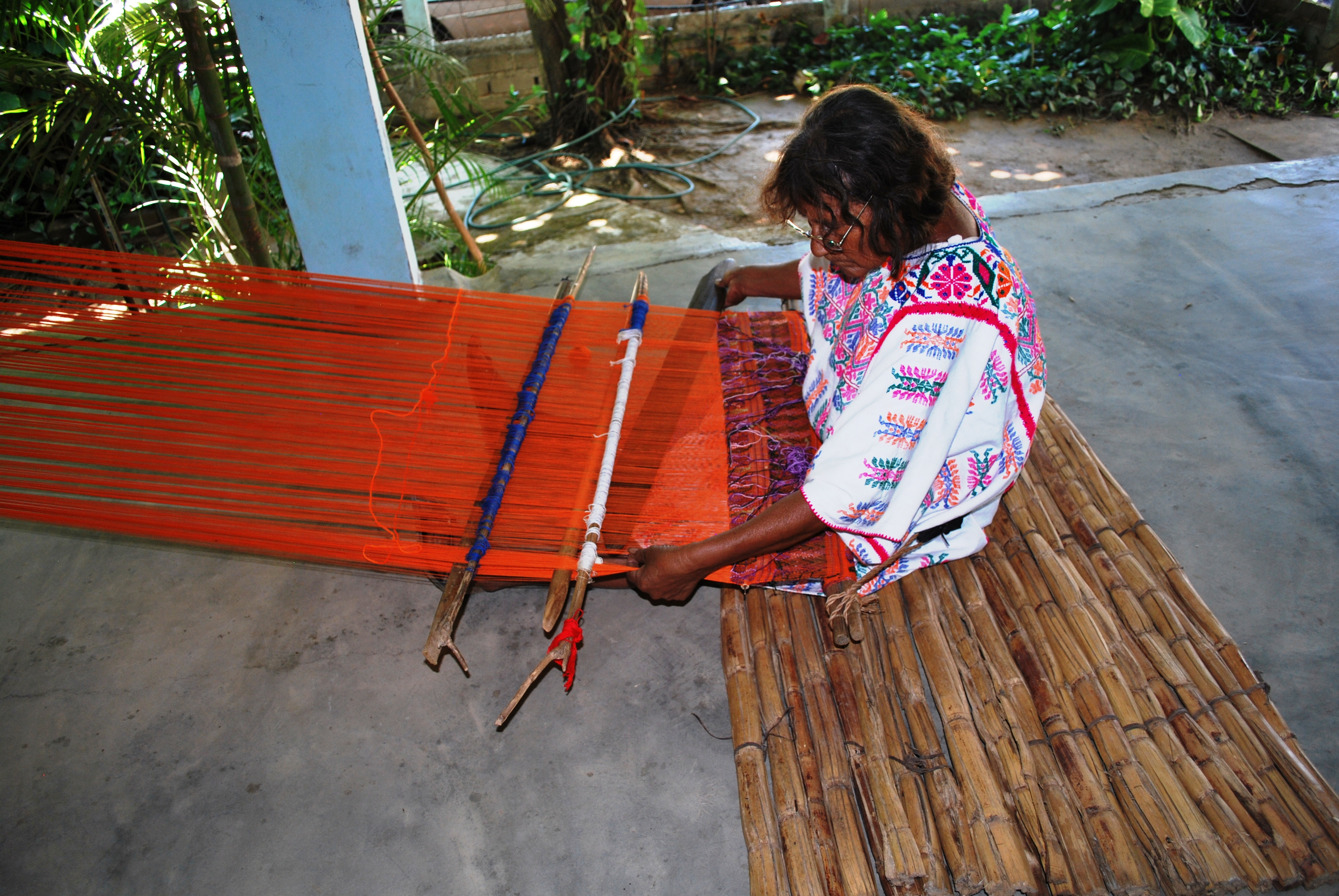
Amuzgo woman weaving in Xochistlahuaca

Traditional fishermen on the Guerrero coast earn little and are marginalized socially and economically. But they also are exposed to global pressures on the fishing industry in both marketing their catch and fishing rights offshore. The growing tourism industry threatens commercial fishermen. Fishermen supplement what they make by fishing with agriculture (mostly corn) and some livestock. Despite this, it is still a valuable economic activity for the communities that depend on it. Between 2000 and 2003, 1,229 tons of fish and other ocean specimens were captured off the Costa Chica, with a value of just under 2 million dollars. Given the length of the coastline, this is considered low. Major species include huachinango (Lutjanus peru), rock oysters (Crossostrea virginensis), lisa (Mugel sp), bandera (Ariidae), jurel (Caranx caninus), pargo (lutjanus argentiventris) and others.

Seventy percent of the fishermen belong to cooperatives. Fishermen work for themselves, selling to intermediaries. Fishing is limited to the ocean close to shore due to the small fiberglass motorboats used. Most fish is shipped to Acapulco, with lesser amounts to Chilpancingo, Tecpan, Chilapa and Tlapa.

Most municipalities of the region are joined by Federal Highway 200, stretching from Acapulco to Pinotepa Nacional in Oaxaca. Most economic development, especially commerce, has taken place along this highway as well, mostly among mestizo inhabitants. Most other roads in the area are in poor condition, either because they are deteriorated or unpaved. During the rainy season, they can be impassable.

San Marcos, which is along Highway 200, is the region's most important commercial center. It is followed by Ometepec.

== Tourism ==
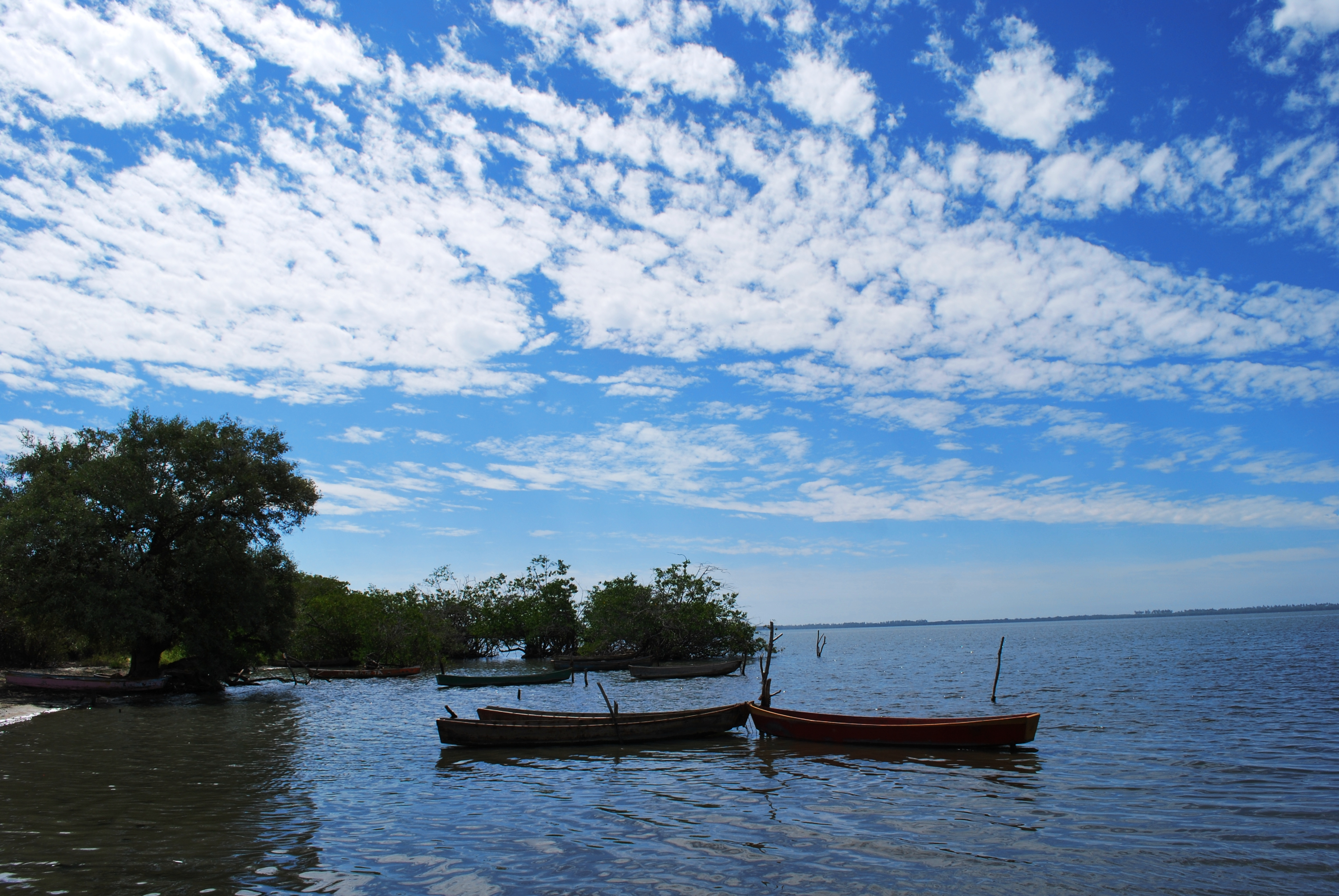
View at Chautengo Lagoon

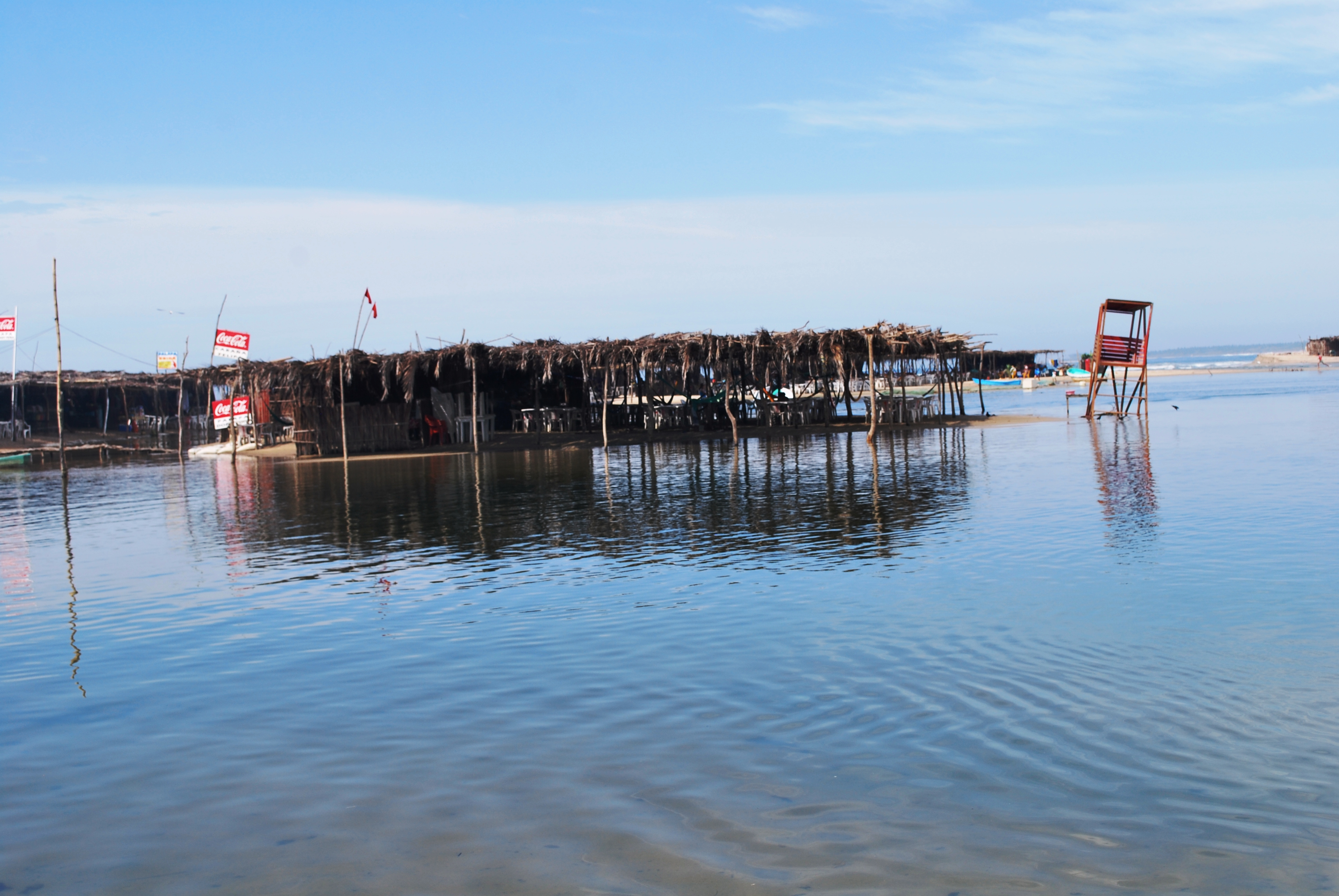
Palapa restaurants at Playa Bocana

While the Costa Chica is generally unknown to tourists, the state government has worked to promote it. It has sunk cement blocks designed to allow the growth of coral to form artificial reefs and accompanying fish and shellfish. The reefs are intended to attract recreational divers. They also serve as breeding areas for the huauchinango fish, which is important for the Costa Chica. The artificial reefs have been placed off various points of the state: in the Costa Chica, about 300 have been placed in Marquelia and Copala. At Playa Ventura, the blocks also serve to break waves making the surf here gentler for swimmers. In the past the beaches of this area were considered dangerous for tourists but this is no longer the case.

Generally tourist facilities are very basic and rustic. Food service, generally under palapas, open-air restaurants with thatched roofs, is common, but accommodations are sparse. One change to encourage tourism was to replace many speed bumps on Highway 200 and other major roads with devices that make the car vibrate instead to control speed. These roads are now also regularly patrolled by the Mexican federal police, which has been trying to control an increased incidence of highway robbery. Chautengo is a large lagoon in the Cruz Grande municipality. Most economic activity is based on fishing, but there are some palapas and food service at the Pico del Monte beach, which is next to where the lagoon opens to the sea. La Bocana is a long beach facing open ocean with a small navigable estuary where the Marquelia River empties into the Pacific Ocean. The area is filled with palapa restaurants as the beach is popular with locals. La Peñitas has two small bays facing the ocean, and one mostly closed off and protected by a strip of land. Accommodations in small bungalows is available along with restaurants. Barra de Tecoanapa is next to the mouth of the Quetzala River. It has beaches facing the ocean. Playa Ventura is in the municipality of Marquelia. This is a small bay facing open ocean with a long beach and medium waves. Unlike other beaches in the area, this is relatively developed with houses, restaurants and hotels made of cinderblock and concrete, painted in bright colors. Hotel services are basic and camping is permitted.

Punta Maldonado is in the municipality of Cuajinicuilapa. This is a small bay home to a fishing village. There is a couple of restaurants and two very modest hotels. The waves are gentle to moderate depending on the beach. This beach borders the state of Oaxaca. In Punta Maldonado, men go out to sea at night to fish, with women taking the catch to market in the morning. The area also produces rock lobsters just a few meters off shore. The small lighthouse is close to the Guerrero/Oaxaca border.

Near Punta Maldonado is Tierra Colorada, which is dedicated to the growing of sesame seed and hibiscus. It lies on the Santo Domingo lagoon, which has a wide variety of fish and birds among its mangroves. Near this is the Barro del Pío, which attracts fishermen in certain seasons. The structures in this area are inhabited only during these seasons.

== See also ==
Regions of Guerrero
