= Cuajinicuilapa (municipality) =

Municipality in the Mexican state of Guerrero

- Municipality
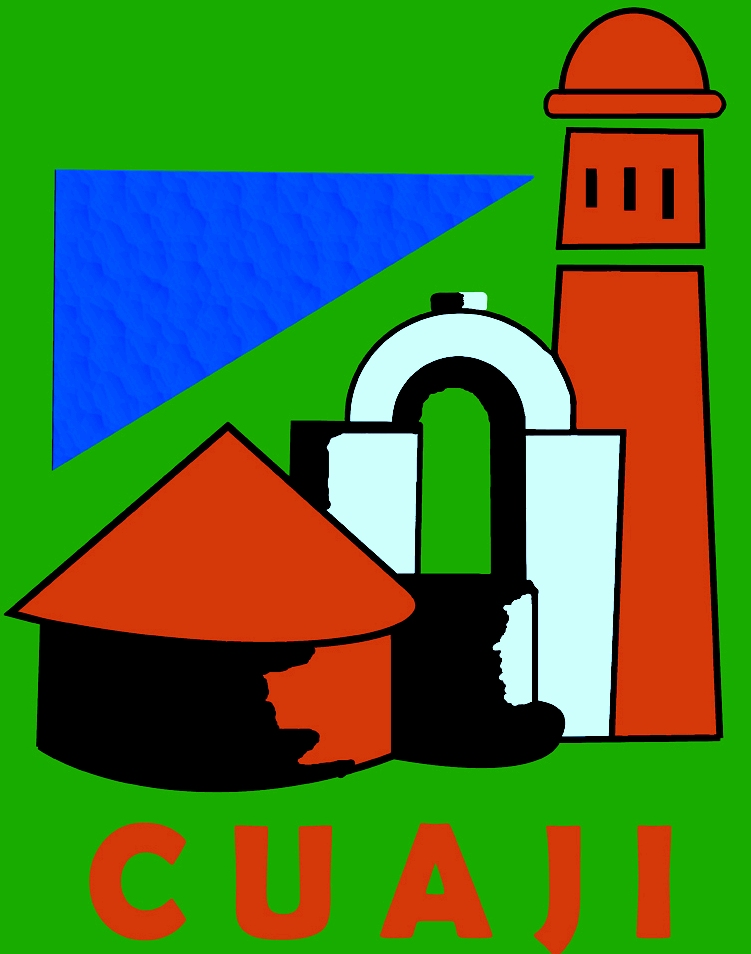
- Coat of arms

- Location in Mexico Cuajinicuilapa (Mexico)
- Coordinates: 16°28′N 98°24′W
- Country: Mexico
- State: Guerrero
- Municipal seat: Cuajinicuilapa

Area
  - Total: 857.1 km^{2} (330.9 sq mi)

Population (2020)
  - Total: 26,627
- Postal code: 41919
- Area code: 741

Cuajinicuilapa is a municipality in the Mexican state of Guerrero and is the southernmost municipality in Guerrero. The municipal seat lies at Cuajinicuilapa. The municipality covers an area of 857.1 km^{2}. In 2020, the municipality had a total population of 26,627, up from 25,537 in 2005.

According to data provided by the XII General Census of 2000 documenting Population and Housing carried out by the National Institute of Geographic Statistics and Informatics (INEGI), there are three main ethnic groups in the municipality: whites, indigenous Mexicans and blacks, which by intermarriage have formed the current phenotypical characteristics of some of the Cuajinicuilapa population.

It is possible to distinguish some small numbers of Indians in the town of Cuajinicuilapa. According to INEGI there are around 1,170 indigenous people in this town, representing 4.56% on the total municipal population whose languages are amusgo with 297 speakers, Mixtec with 211 speakers, Nahuatl with 5, Tlapanecos with 22, Zapotec with 2.

There are also whites and other native Indian newcomers to the municipality who are traders and merchants. Some residents of the municipality have distinct Negroid features which in colonial days were called "mulatos pardos" (mulatto brown) denoting their negroid admixture.

== The municipality ==
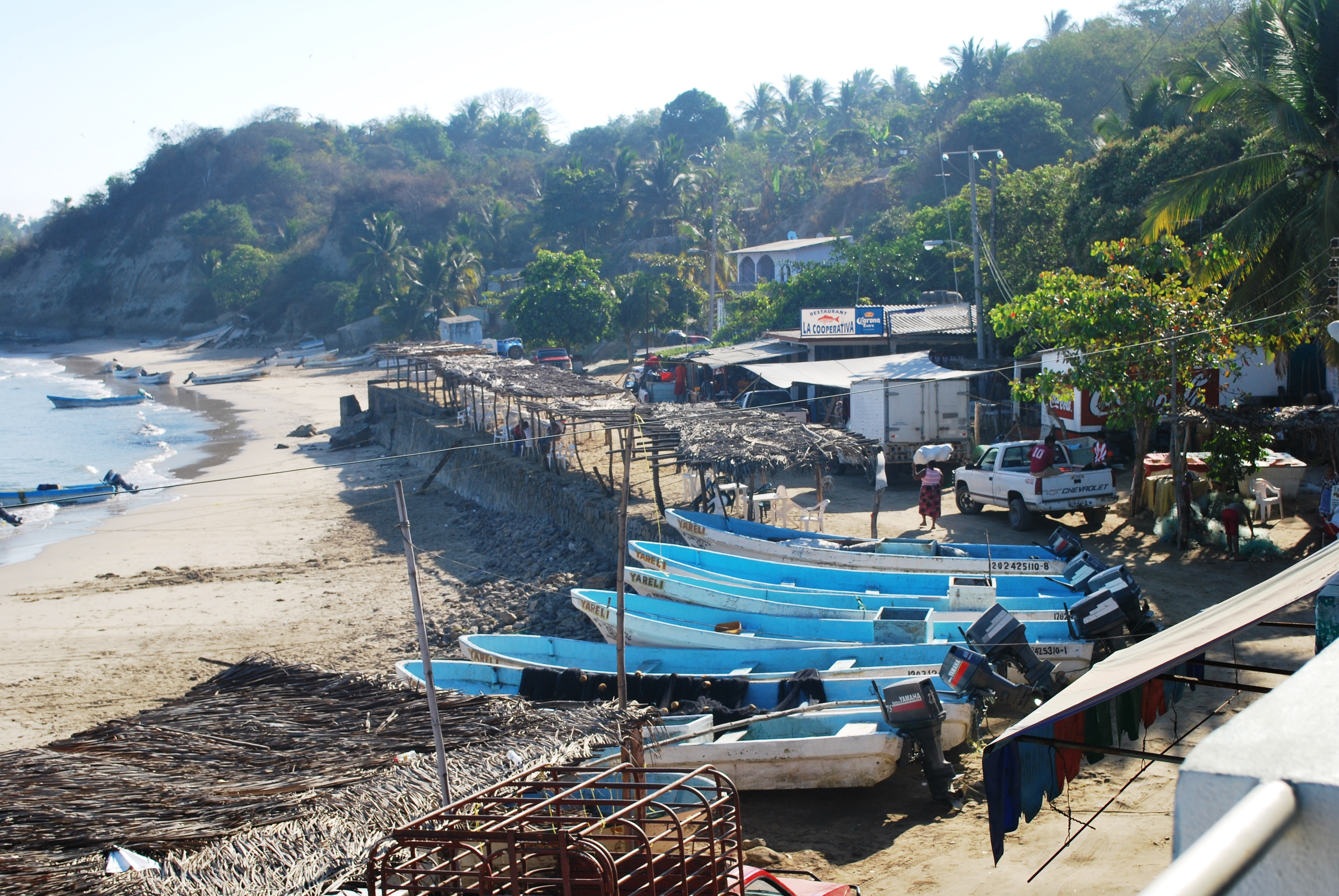
View of Punta Maldonado

As seat, the town of Cuajinicuilapa is the local government for ninety communities, which together cover an area of 715km2. The municipality borders the municipalities of Azoyú, Ometepec, Juchitán and Marquelia with the Pacific Ocean to the south and west and the state of Oaxaca to the east. It has 28 preschools, 41 primary schools, 14 middle schools and three public high schools. There is also a vocational school and a high school run by the Universidad Autónoma de Guerrero. The main roads of the municipality are Highway 200 connecting Acapulco and Pinotepa Nacional and the local road connecting Cuajinicuilapa with Punta Maldonado. The rest of the communities are connected by dirt roads.

One notable Afro-Mexican community outside the seat is San Nicolás. The residents here have a reputation for festivities and dancing. It is said that people have gotten ill and even died after parties called fandangos, which can last for up to three days. Another community with an Afro-Mexican population is Barajillas.

The Playa de Tierra Colorada is located in the community of the same name located between Punta Maldonado and the Barra de Tecoanapa. The area was declared an ecological reserve by the municipality in 1986 because it is a breeding area for marine turtles as well as its rich vegetation.

Punta Maldonado is a small cape, which is the furthest point east of the state of Guerrero. It is an important fishing port, especially of rock lobster as well as its large Afro-Mexican population. The men go out to sea at night to fish in shifts that can last up to fifteen hours every day. It has a small antique lighthouse very near the border with Oaxaca.

The Santo Domingo lagoon has a wide variety of fish and birds especially among its mangroves. Near Santo Domingo is the Barra del Pío. It is generally inhabited only during certain fishing seasons, with houses here that are abandoned during other times of the year.

== History ==
Cuajinicuilapa is located on what was once the Ayacastla province, stretching from the river Ayutla all the way to the plains that share borders with the states of Guerrero and Oaxaca, and was integrated with people of different ethnic and language groups such as: Ayutla Xochitonala, Acatlan Cuauhtepec, Tututepec, and the Tlacuilo had the language of the Mixtec. Nahuatl was probably the majority. Igualapa and Ometepec spoke ayacasteca, but also understood amusga speaking individuals.

This language was peculiar to Xicayán, Ayotzinapa and Xochistlahuaca. They also formed part of the province of Huehuetán which spoke Huehueteca. The Quetzapotla, spoke quetzapoteca and Quahuitlán spoke quahuteca.

Cuajinicuilapa lies precisely in what was Quahhuitlán, which is an area thirty miles wide and fifty miles long which was situated on the dividing line between the town now called Cuajinicuilapa and the State of Oaxaca. Quahuitlán was subject to the chieftainship of Tututepec.

In 1824, when Mexico first became a Federal Republic, Cuajinicuilapa belonged to the party of Ayutla and to the District of Tlapa in the State of Puebla. By creating the state of Guerrero in 1850 Cuajiniculapa was integrated to the municipality of Ometepec and the District of Allende in 1852 and was constituted as a town with the southern part of Ometepec and was integrated to San Nicolás Maldonado which is the municipal head of Cuajinicuilapa which since 1862 belongs to Abasolo district.
