= San Nicolás, Guerrero =

Municipality in the Mexican state of Guerrero

San Nicolás
- Municipality
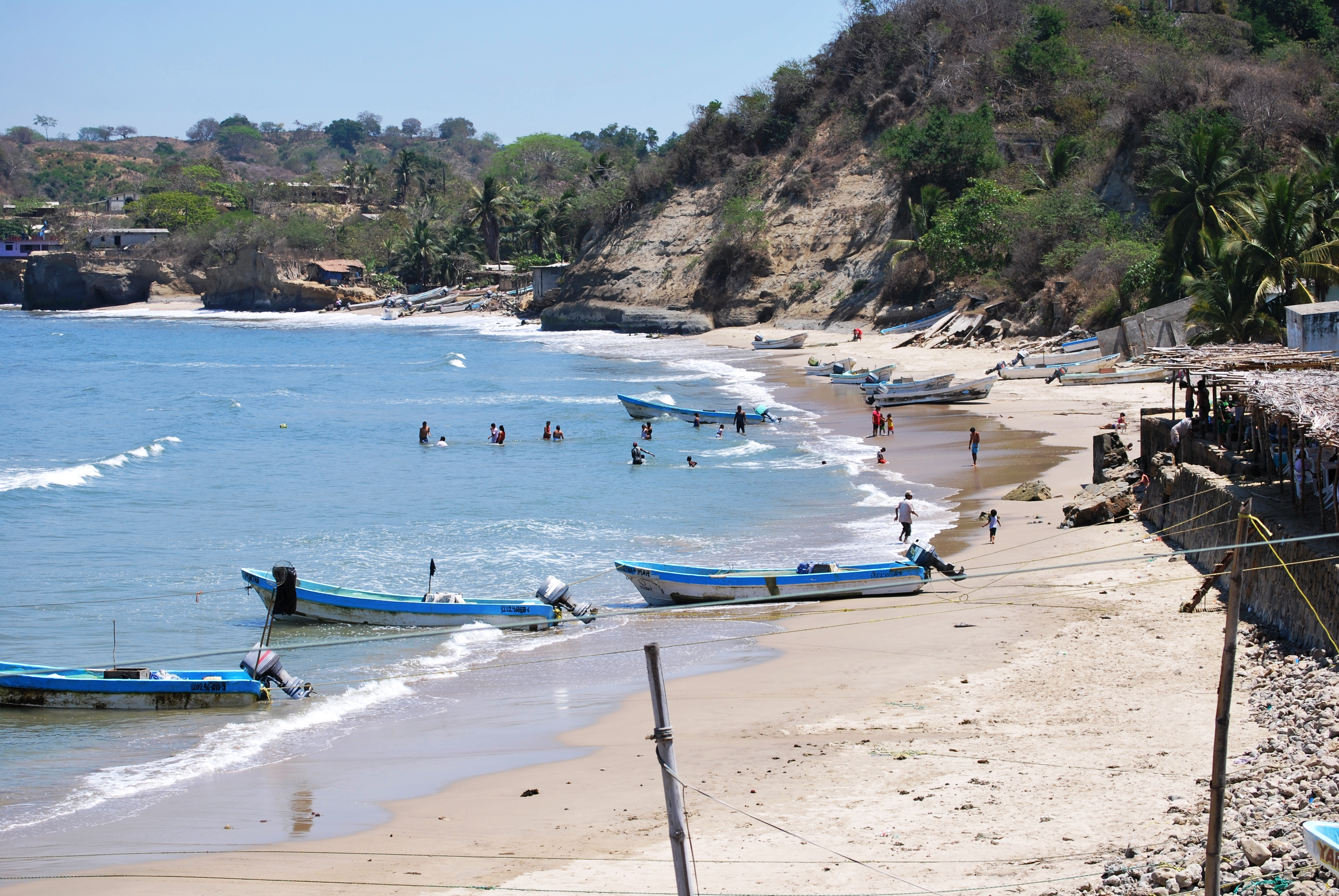
- Beach at Punta Maldonado

- Location of San Nicolás San Nicolás (Mexico)
- Coordinates: 16.42°N 98.52°W
- Country: Mexico
- State: Guerrero
- Incorporated: 21 May 2022
- Seat: San Nicolás

Area
  - Total: 167.22 km^{2} (64.56 sq mi)

Population (2020 Census)
  - Total: 6,984
  - Density: 41.77/km^{2} (108.2/sq mi)
  - Seat: 3,249
- Time zone: UTC-6 (Central)
- Postal codes: 41960–41968
- Area code: 741
- Website: sannicolasguerrero.gob.mx

San Nicolás is a municipality in the Mexican state of Guerrero. It is located 165 kilometres (103 mi) southeast of the state capital of Chilpancingo. It is named after its patron saint, Nicholas of Tolentino. Its creation from the municipality of Cuajinicuilapa was approved in 2021 and went into force on 21 May 2022.

== Geography ==
The municipality of San Nicolás is located in the Costa Chica region of southeastern Guerrero. It borders the municipality of Cuajinicuilapa in Guerrero to the west, north, and east, the Oaxacan municipality of Santiago Tapextla to the southeast, and the Pacific Ocean to the southwest. The municipality covers an area of 167.22 square kilometres (64.56 sq mi). The municipality's Pacific coast serves as a critical nesting area for the leatherback turtle and is protected as the Ramsar site Playa Tortuguera Tierra Colorada.

San Nicolás has a subhumid temperate climate with rain in the summer. Average temperatures range between 24 and 28 °C (75–82 °F), and average annual precipitation ranges between 1,100 and 1,300 millimetres (43–51 in).

== History ==
The municipality of San Nicolás is located on territory that was once part of the province of Quahuitlán, whose inhabitants spoke Quahteca or Cuahuiteca, which was probably a Mixtec dialect. Quahuitlán which was controlled by Tututepec until around 1497, when the area was conquered by the Mexica Empire. Pedro de Alvarado conquered the area for Spain in 1522, and in 1548 the area was made an encomienda of Tristán de Luna y Arellano. In the late 16th century, Spanish cattle ranchers brought free and enslaved blacks and mulattoes to the area, from whom most of San Nicolás's present-day inhabitants are descended.

In 2004, inhabitants of San Nicolás and nearby communities began an initiative to separate from Cuajinicuilapa and form a new municipality, citing a lack of resources for development in their area. On 31 August 2021 the Guerrero state legislature approved the formation of the municipality of San Nicolás comprising ten localities previously belonging to Cuajinicuilapa. The state constitutional amendment establishing the municipality was passed on 13 January 2022 and went into force on 21 May 2022.

== Administration ==
San Nicolás held its first elections as an independent municipality in 2024. The municipal government of San Nicolás comprises a municipal president, a councillor (Spanish: síndico), and six trustees (regidores).

== Demographics and culture ==
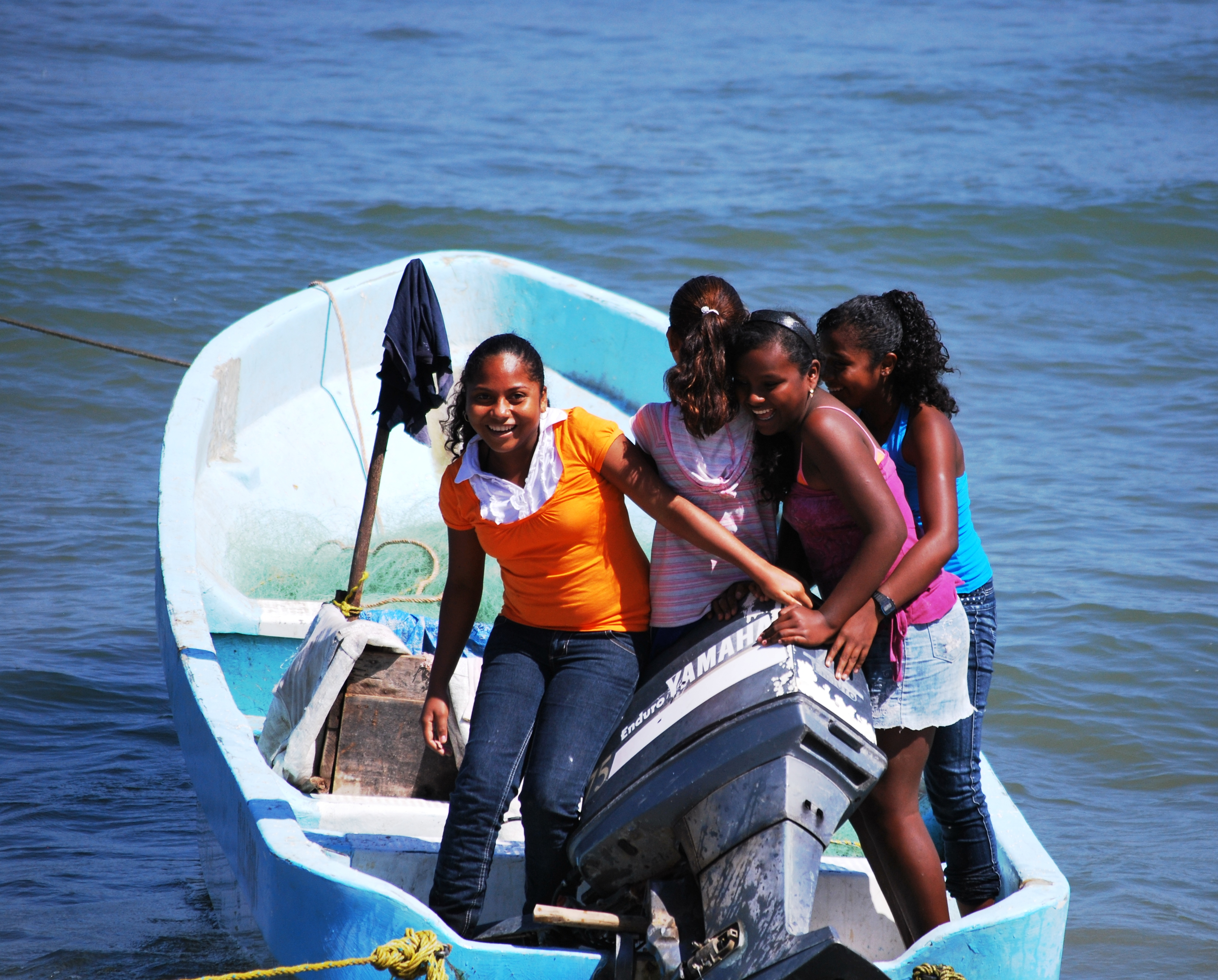
Girls in Punta Maldonado.

In the 2020 INEGI Census, the localities that now comprise the municipality of San Nicolás recorded a population of 6984 inhabitants. The municipal seat, also named San Nicolás, recorded a population of 3249 inhabitants in the 2020 Census. The next most populous localities are El Pitahayo and Punta Maldonado, which recorded populations of 1583 and 848 inhabitants respectively in the 2020 Census.

Like the neighbouring Cuajinicuilapa, San Nicolás has been identified by cultural authorities, academics, and journalists as a centre of Afro-Mexican culture in Guerrero's Costa Chica. However, residents of San Nicolás self-identify as moreno (black Indians) and reject labels such as "black", "Afro-Mexican" and "Afromestizo". Since the late 1990s, a significant community of expatriates from San Nicolás has lived in the cities of Winston-Salem, Greensboro and Charlotte in the U.S. state of North Carolina.

== Economy ==
The economy of San Nicolás is based on smallholder farming: farmers grow corn for their own consumption, and sesame and fruit (e.g., mango, papaya and watermelon) for sale to regional markets. Seaside communities depend heavily on fishing.
