= Marquelia (municipality) =

Municipality in the Mexican state of Guerrero

- Municipality
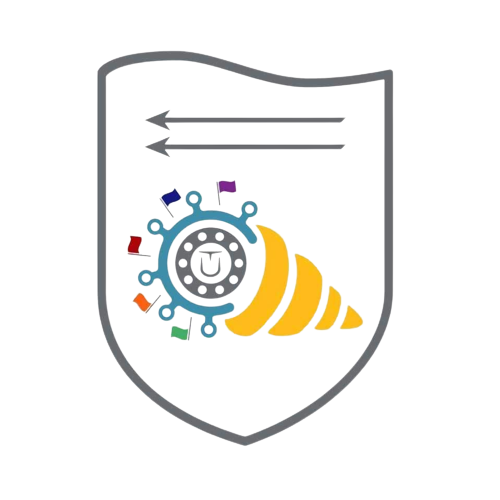
- Coat of arms

- Location within Guerrero Location within Mexico
- Coordinates: 16°35′N 98°49′W
- Country: Mexico
- State: Guerrero
- Municipal seat: Marquelia

Population (2005)
  - Total: 11,801
- Time zone: UTC-6 (Zona Centro)
- Website: gobiernodemarquelia.gob.mx

Marquelia is a municipality in the Mexican state of Guerrero. The municipal seat lies at Marquelia.

In 2005, the municipality had a population of 11,801. By 2020, it had risen to 14,280.

The municipality of Marquelia was created from sections of Azoyú and Cuajinicuilapa in 2001.
