= Cuajinicuilapa =

- Town
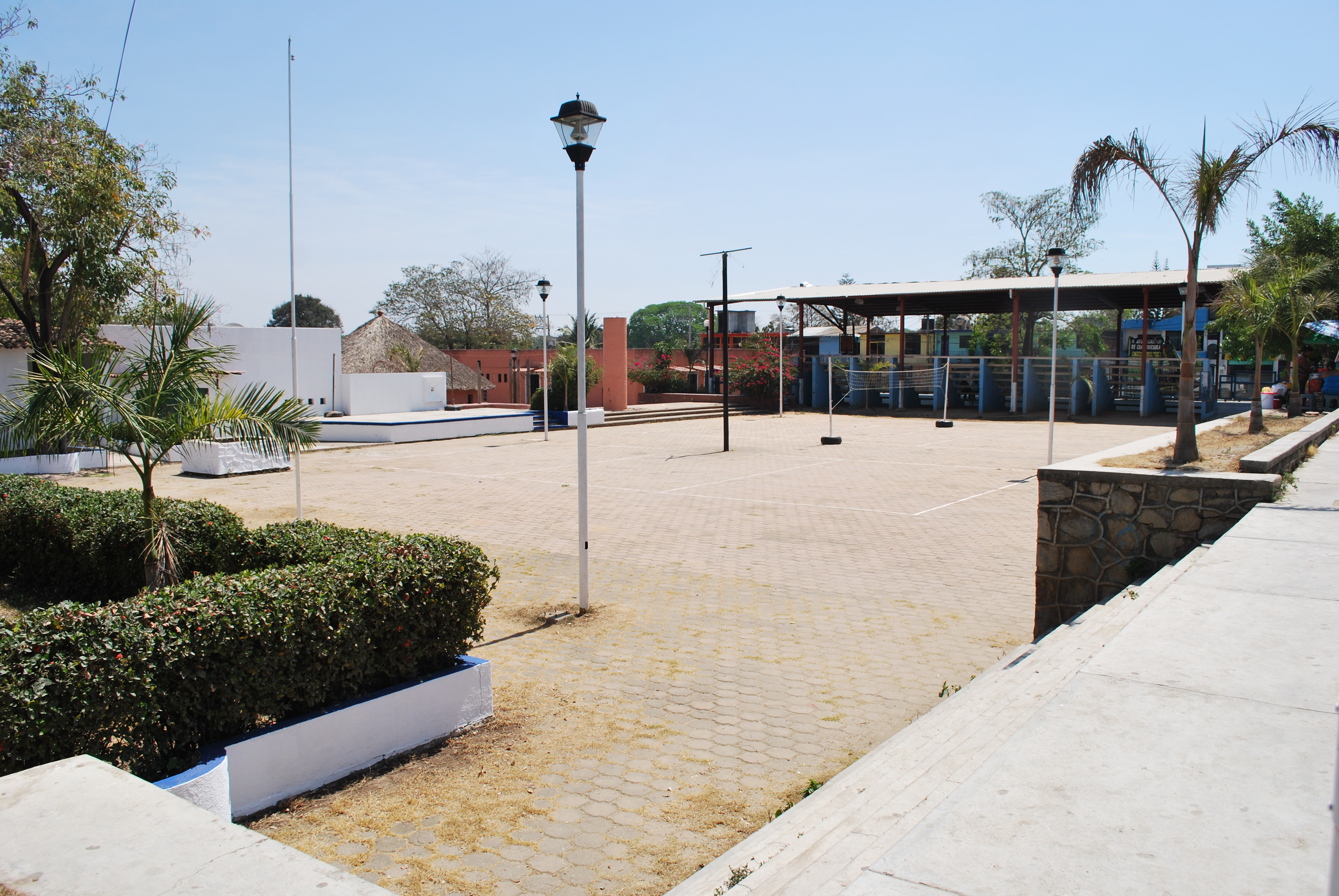
- Main plaza of Cuajinicuilapa

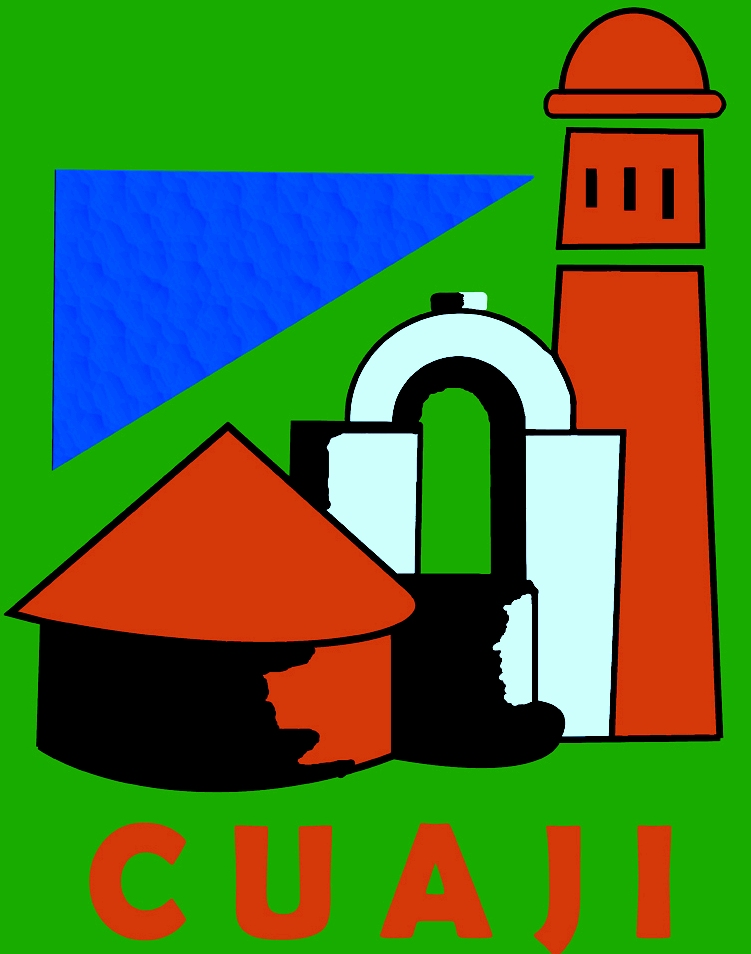
- Seal

- Location within Guerrero Location within Mexico
- Coordinates: 16°28′18″N 98°24′55″W
- Country: Mexico
- State: Guerrero

Government
  - Municipal President: C. José Guadalupe Salvador Cruz Castro

Area
  - Total: 715 km^{2} (276 sq mi)
- Elevation (of seat): 50 m (160 ft)

Population (2020) Municipality
  - Total: 26,627
  - Seat: 10,282
- Time zone: UTC-6 (Central (US Central))
- Postal code (of seat): 41919
- Area code: 741
- Demonym: Cuijileña
- Website: (in Spanish)

Cuajinicuilapa is the head town of the municipality of the same name in the Costa Chica region of the Mexican state of Guerrero. A low-lying area, it borders the Pacific Ocean and the state of Oaxaca. The municipality has the state's largest population of Afro-Mexicans with most of the population of this ethnicity. The town and municipality are highly socioeconomically marginalized and it is the poorest municipality of the state, with the economy dependent on livestock and fishing.

== The town ==
The town of Cuajinicuilapa is 361 km from the Guerrero state capital of Chilpancingo and has an altitude of fifty meters above sea level. While it is the commercial center of a rural municipality with two small supermarkets, various stores and a traditional municipal market, it has a high level of socioeconomic marginalization. It is also the center of communications and transportation with mail service and telephone mostly limited to here and it has a small airstrip.

It is the seat of a municipality that promotes its Afro-Mexican heritage. The town was host to the 13th Encuentro de Pueblos Negros in 2011, sponsored by the Centro Cultural de España en México. The purpose of the event is to promote Afro-Mexican identity, issues and culture in Mexico.

The Museo de las Culturas Afromestizas, formerly called the Museo de la Tercera Raíz, is the first museum in Mexico dedicated to the descendants of African slaves in Mexico and their history. It is located in the center of the town, near the main plaza.

== Demographics and culture ==
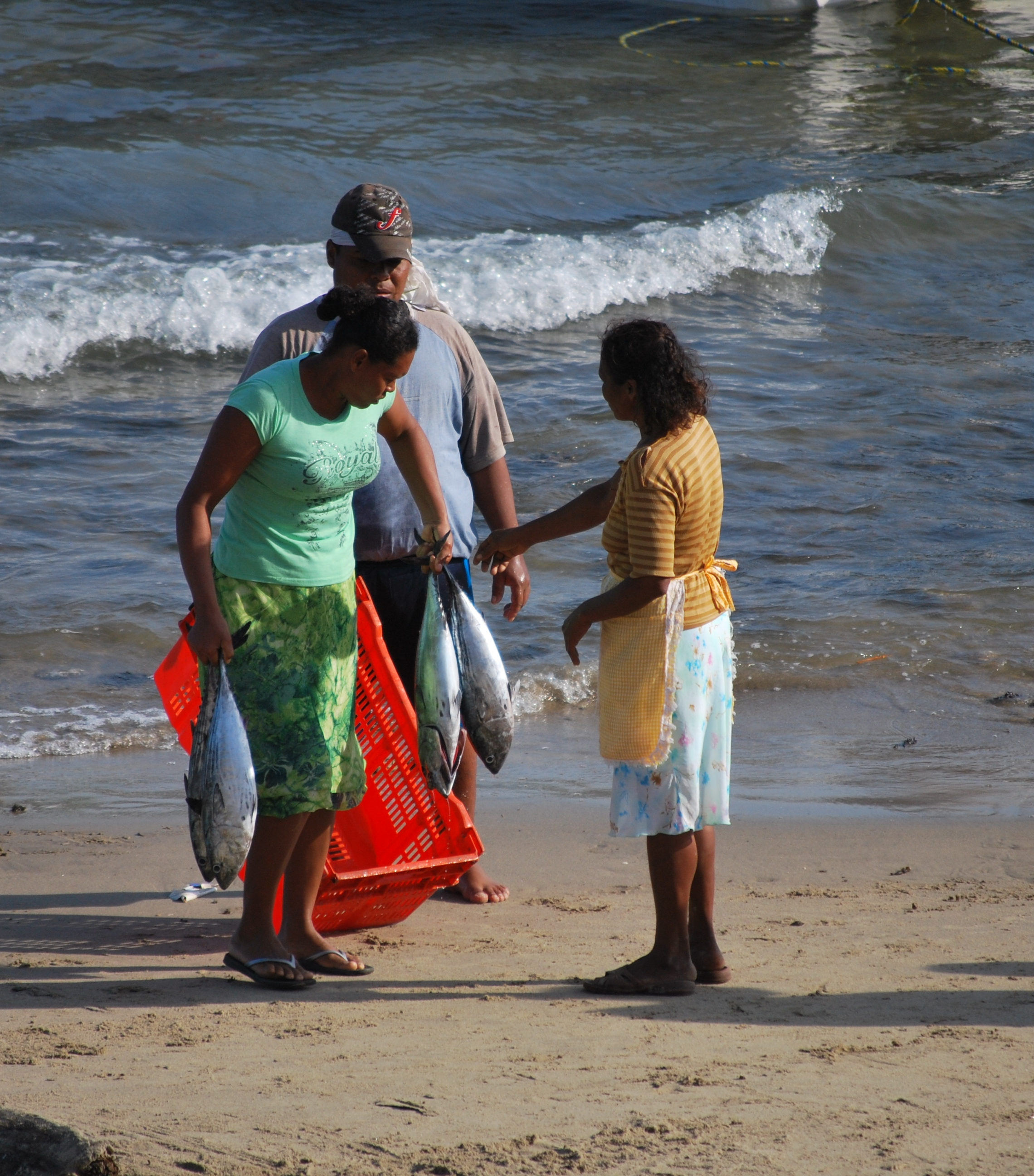
Afro-Mexican fishermen in Punta Maldonado

Cuajinicuilapa is the largest Afro-Mexican community in the Costa Chica region of Guerrero with most of the population of this ethnicity. The municipal government promotes Cuajinicuilapa as the “municipio negro” or “black municipality” as a way to obtain federal resources. Afro-Mexican culture is not defined by language or dress, but rather body language, vocabulary and a shared history. Much of the “black” population is mixed with indigenous. Those native to the municipality are called criollos even if black. There is some hostility between blacks and indigenous. Much of the population of the area has migrated out since the 1980s. The population has grown, but much of this is because of migration into Cuajinicuilapa by other groups, including Amuzgos and Mixtecs, especially in the 2000s. They have become the majority in a number of communities in the municipality including El Cuije and La Petaca. As of 2010, there are just over 1,300 who speak an indigenous language, most of whom speak Amuzgo and Mixtec.

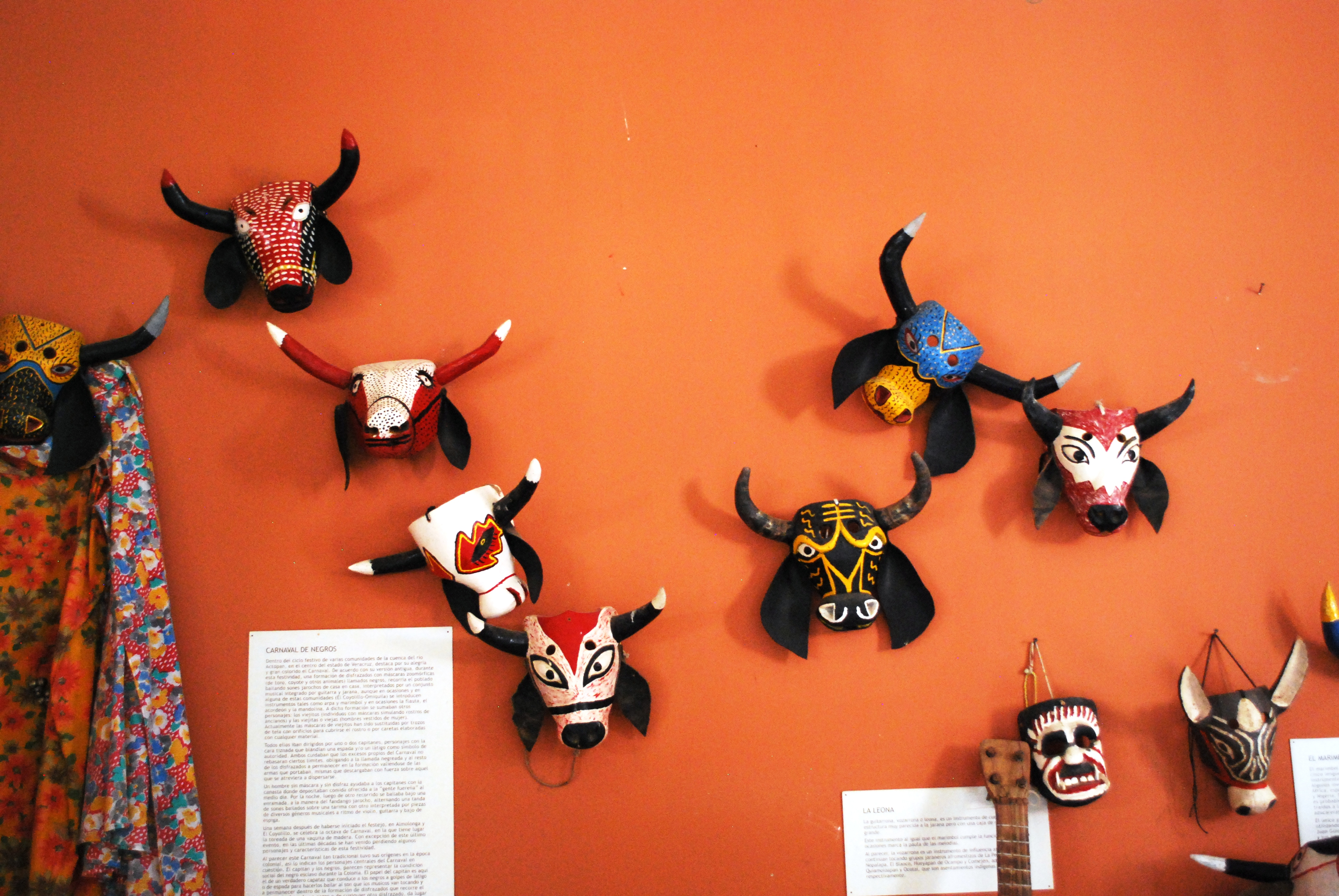
Masks on display at the Museo de las Culturas Afromestizas

Los Diablos (the devils) is the best known Afro-Mexican dance in the Costa Chica with dancers wearing devil's mask and dancing with wild, exaggerated movements. They are attended by assistants with whips. From 30 October to 1 November, the dancers leave the cemetery to dance, eat offerings of food and more. They spend three days in the streets with dance, music, and theatrical antics before “returning” to the grave. The two main dancers represent the chief of the devils called Tenango or Pancho along with his wife called La Minga, the mother of devils who also appears in other regional dances. The dance as various influences including African and Catholic. While the dance and dressing up as devils were exclusively for men, this has changed as many have left to work outside of the Costa Chica. Women and children have now participated in the annual ritual. Other dances in the municipality include El Torito (the little bull), which is centered on a frame in the shape of a bull that goes through town with residents dancing around it. Versions of La Conquista and Doce Pares de Francia have unusual characters such as Hernán Cortés, Cuauhtémoc, Moctezuma, Charlemagne and Turkish horsemen. Las Chilenas are dances with erotic movements.

Regional specialties include barbacoa, red and green mole, pig's head with mole sauce, tamales of various types including with iguana meat, seafood prepared in various ways including shrimp and lobster. Traditional drinks include chilate (similar to pozol) and a drink called chicha.

Almost all in the municipality are Catholic with only about 2,500 people professing other faiths such as Jehovah's Witness and Pentecostal. However, the percentage of non-Catholics is growing. The main feast days are dedicated to the Apostle James (in August) and Nicolas of Tolentino in September. On the second Friday of Lent, a regional fair exhibits the area's products, such as cattle, along with cockfights, horse racing and popular dance.

== Geography ==
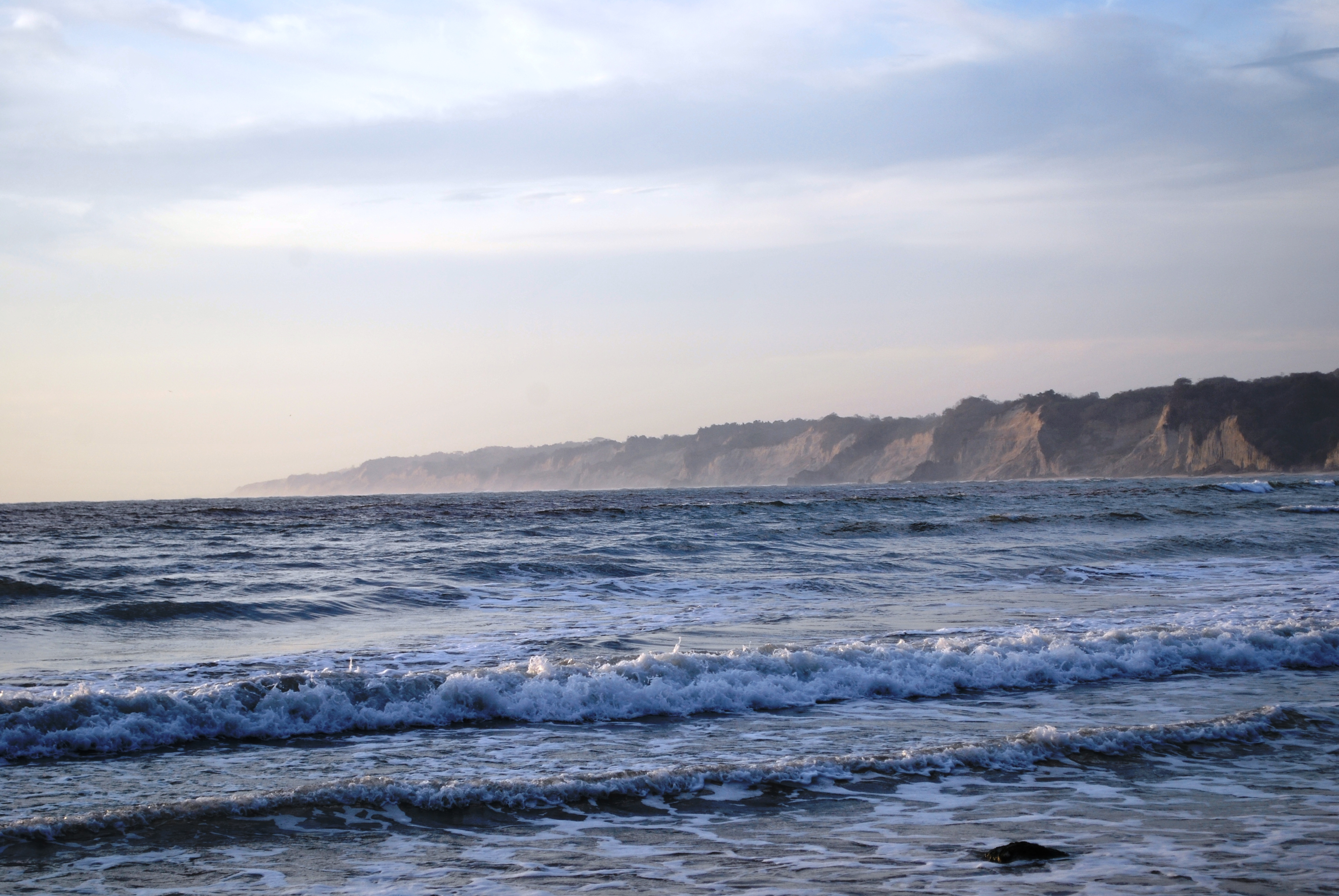
Bay at Punta Maldonado

Cuajinicuilapa is in the Costa Chica region of Guerrero in the southeast of the state along the Pacific Ocean and the border of Oaxaca. The area is mostly rolling hills along with beaches on the coast. Near the Pacific Ocean and the Azoyú border in the northwest the land is flat, in the southeast it is semi-flat with gentle hills. There are very few significant elevations but they include El Borjo, 85 m (279 ft) above sea level, Las Tablas, 70 m (230 ft), Pozas de Agua, 85 m (279 ft), and Piedra Parada, 45 m (148 ft).

The climate is semi moist and hot with average temperatures varying from 19 °C (66 °F) to 34 °C (93 °F) during the year. There is a defined rainy season from May to October.

The most important river is the Santa Catarina, which enters the municipality from Ometepec. Here it joins with the Quetzala to empty into the Pacific at the Barra de Tecoanapa. In addition there are a number of streams such as La Zanja, Arriero, Las Playitas, Mataplátano, Cuaulote, Cortija, El Chorro, La Serpiente, Carrizo, Arroyo Viejo, Soledad, Tecoyame, La Presa, Fortuna and Samaritanes. There are some lagoons such as the Monte Alto, Portezuela and Albufera Salinitas.

As the vicinity is placed in a subduction zone, it is prone to earthquakes (see: M5.2 earthquake near Cuajinicuilapa).

== Economy ==
It has a high level of socioeconomic marginalization and is the poorest in Guerrero. About forty two percent of homes have adobe walls, about fifty seven percent have cement and less than one percent have wood or laminate walls. Sixty one percent have running water, about thirty six percent have drainage and eighty nine percent have electricity. About eighty two percent own their own homes.

Much of the municipality is grassland suitable for agriculture and livestock. The principal cash crops are hibiscus and sesame seed. Other crops include palm trees and corn. Fishing is important on the coast proper, especially in Punta Maldonado.

There are some deposits of iron and aluminum oxide.

The main tourist attraction is Punta Maldonado, also known as El Faro. It is followed by the Santo Domingo Lagoon, which has extensive mangrove and Barra de Pío.

== History ==
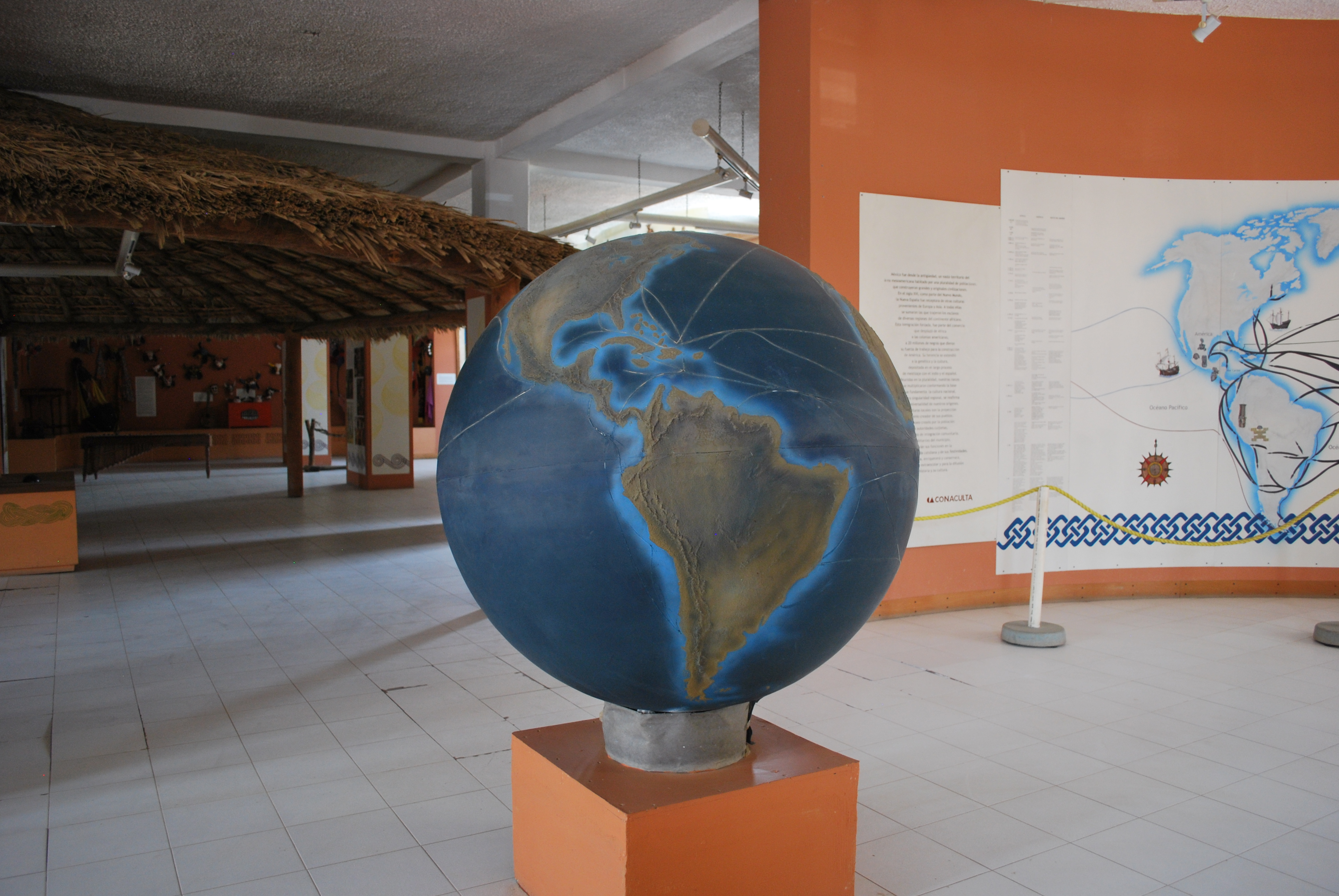
Exhibits in the Museo de las Culturas Afromestizas about the slave trade

The name comes from the Nahuatl phrase cuauhxinicuilli-atl-pan, which means “in the river of the cuajiicuil plant (a kind of edible legumbre).

From before the arrival of the Spanish, Cuajinicuilapa was the province of Ayacastla, with the town of Igualapa as capital. After Independence, the capital moved to Ometepec.

The area was conquered by 1522 by Pedro de Alvarado, who established the Spanish town of Acatlán. In 1531, an uprising by the Tlapaneca caused many to flee the area. During the 16th century, the area lost almost all of its indigenous population due to war, oppression and disease.

The loss of indigenous labor prompted the Spanish to bring African slaves over the colonial period for 300 years. Most of the slaves headed for Mexico arrived in Veracruz. However, those that managed to escape began to make their way to the Costa Chica area. The area was dedicated to livestock, with much of the land owned by Mateo Anaus y Mauleon. The isolation of the area and the lack of workers led to an arrangement between Anaus and the runaway slaves, trading cheap labor for sanctuary. Over time the Cuajinicuilapa area was home to a number of communities of escaped slaves and their descendants. Many of these worked as cowboys or with leather. Over time, many of these intermarried with indigenous and whites.

During the Mexican War of Independence the main rebels were Afro-Mexicans Juan Bruno and Francisco Atilano Santa María, but their effect was limited as there was little access to firearms.

In 1878, much of the land came under the control of the Casa Miller enterprise, an association between Pérez Reguera and Carlos A. Miller. The enterprise consisted of a soap factory, and land where they raised cattle and grew cotton. The holdings include about 125,000 hectares, centered on Cuajinicuilapa. The town was home to whites. The blacks lived in small huts with thatched roofs based on African-style construction. Product from the enterprise was shipped through Tecoanapa with destination such as Salina Cruz, Manzanillo and Acapulco.

On March 20, 2012, a 7.4 earthquake hit the area, which caused two deaths, severe damage to over 500 homes and partial damage to another thousand.
