= Igualapa (municipality) =

Municipality in the Mexican state of Guerrero

- Municipality
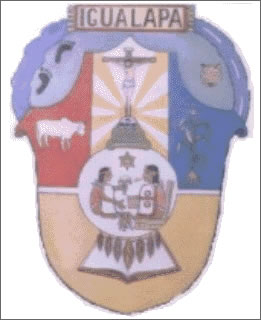
- Coat of arms

- Location in Mexico
- Coordinates: 16°42′N 98°26′W
- Country: Mexico
- State: Guerrero
- Municipal seat: Igualapa

Area
  - Total: 266.7 km^{2} (103.0 sq mi)

Population (2005)
  - Total: 10,312

Igualapa is a municipality in the Mexican state of Guerrero. The municipal seat lies at Igualapa. The municipality covers an area of 266.7 km^{2}.

As of 2005, the municipality had a total population of 10,312.
