= Barajillas =

Community in Cuajinicuilapa, Guerrero, Mexico

Barajillas is a community in the municipality of Cuajinicuilapa, Guerrero, Mexico. According to the 2010 census, the town has 759 inhabitants. In 2000, the town had 833 inhabitants. 63 inhabitants are indigenous, of which at least 2 do not speak Spanish. According to the statistics of the Instituto Nacional de Estadistica y Geografia 19% of the population are illiterate. The postal code is 41951. The town has three schools, a primary school, a "telesecundaria", or secondary school that receives the lessons by way of satellite, and a preschool. The town is typical of small villages in the region for its community telephone service, where calls are announced by way of a loudspeaker. The town borders Mexico highway route 200 which parallels the coast from Tepic Nayarit all the way to the Guatemala border. The north side of the town is bordered by the Rio Cortijos, a wide, sandy, shallow river famous for its "endocos" or very large fresh water shrimp. The town is also known for its unique racial and ethnic mixture of Afro-Mexican peoples, as well as three indigenous groups, the Amuzgo, the "Mixteco" or Mixtec, and the Nahuatl.
