= Tlacoachistlahuaca (municipality) =

Municipality in the Mexican state of Guerrero

- Municipality
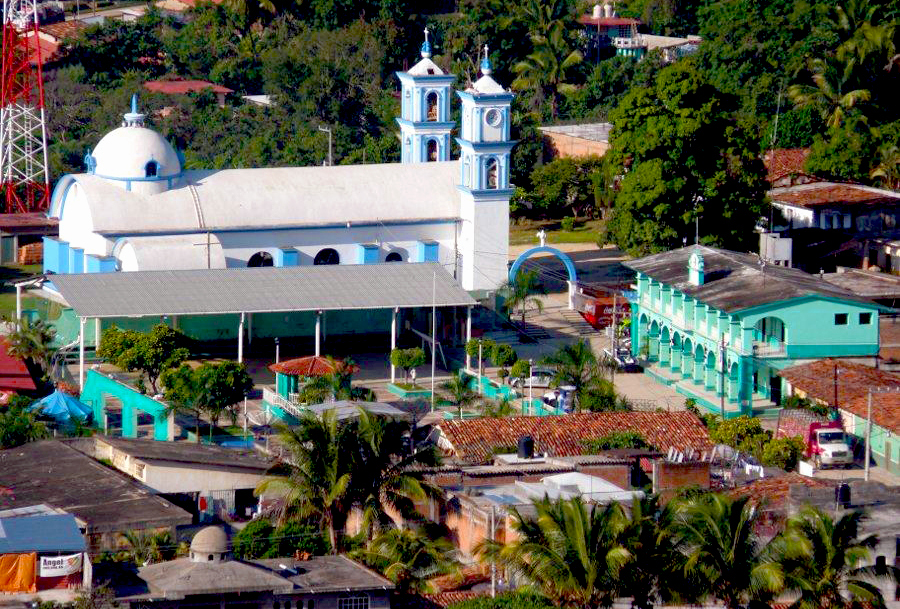

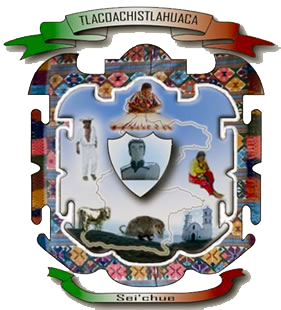
- Coat of arms

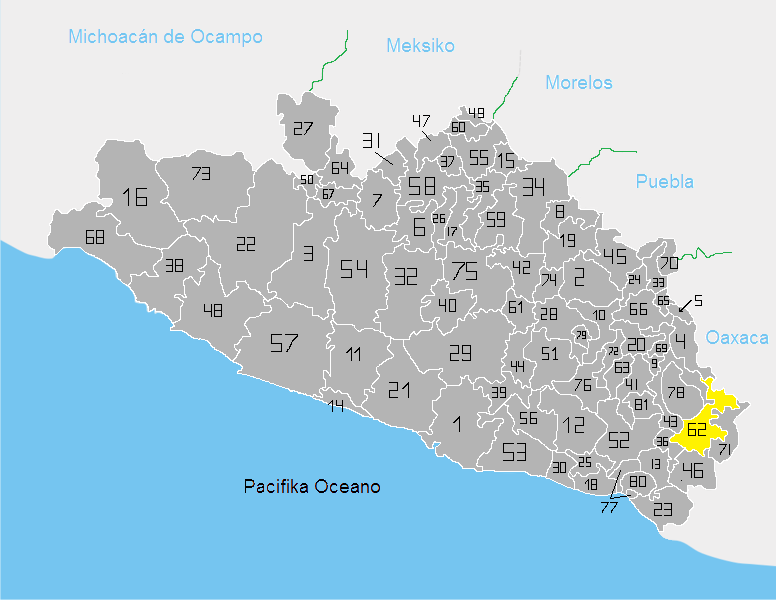

- Location in Mexico Tlacoachistlahuaca (Guerrero)
- Coordinates: 16°47′N 98°12′W
- Country: Mexico
- State: Guerrero
- Municipal seat: Tlacoachistlahuaca

Area
  - Total: 450.6 km^{2} (174.0 sq mi)

Population (2005)
  - Total: 18,055
- Time zone: UTC-6 (Central)
- Website: tlacoachistlahuaca.gob.mx

Tlacoachistlahuaca is a municipality in the Mexican state of Guerrero. The municipal seat lies at Tlacoachistlahuaca. The municipality covers an area of 450.6 km^{2}.

In 2020, the municipality had a total population of 22,781, up from 18,055 in 2005.
