= Ometepec (municipality) =

Municipality in the Mexican state of Guerrero

- Municipality
- Location in Mexico Ometepec (Mexico)
- Coordinates: 16°48′N 98°13′W
- Country: Mexico
- State: Guerrero
- Municipal seat: Ometepec

Area
  - Total: 1,100.6 km^{2} (424.9 sq mi)

Population (2005)
  - Total: 55,283
- Time zone: UTC-6 (Zona Centro)

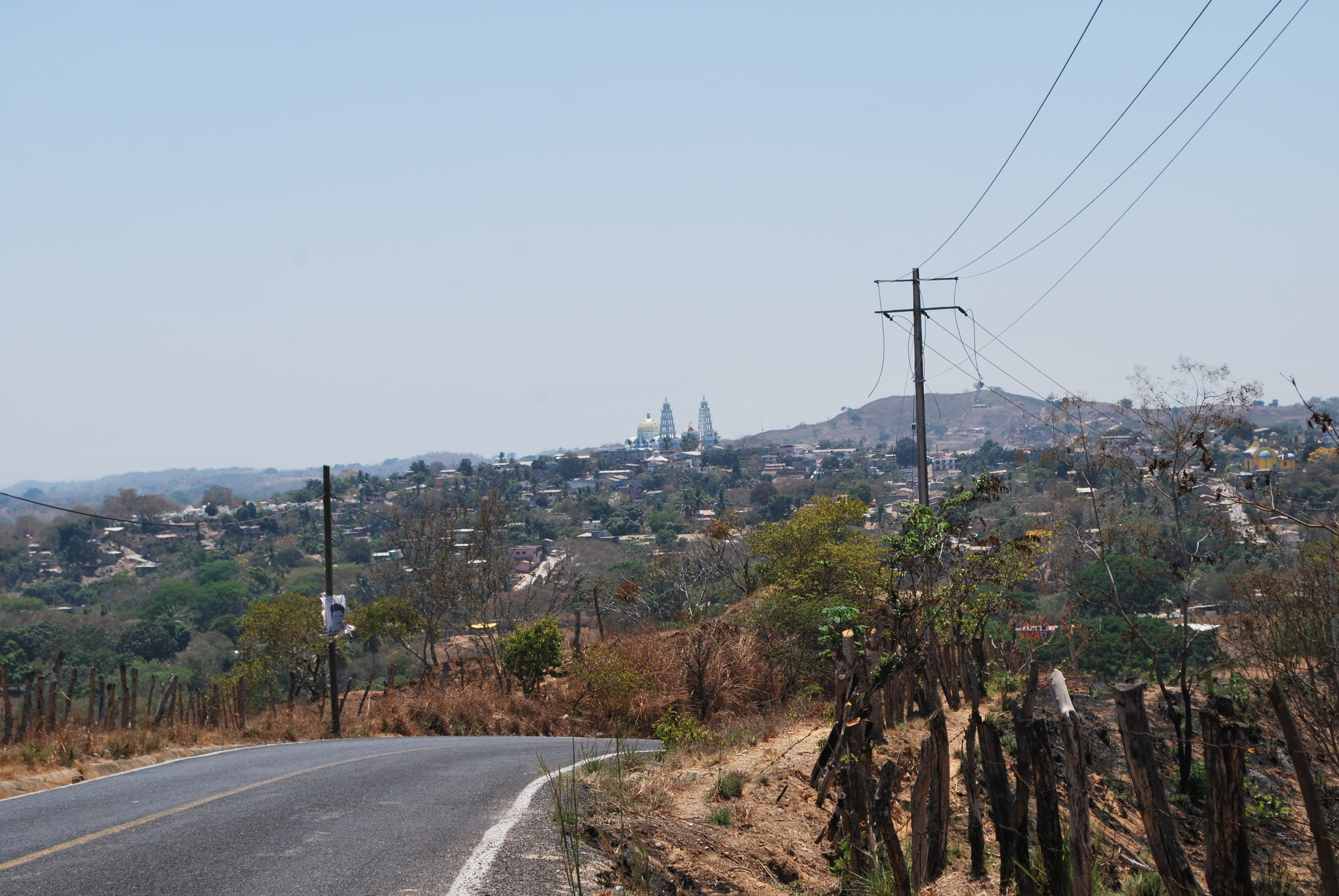
Looking towards Ometepec from the Xochistlahuaca road in Guerrero.

Ometepec is a municipality in the Mexican state of Guerrero. The municipal seat lies at Ometepec. The municipality covers an area of 1,100.6 km^{2}.

As of 2005, the municipality had a total population of 55,283.
