= Ometepec =

City in the Mexican state of Guerrero

- Municipal seat and city
- Location in Mexico Ometepec (Mexico)
- Coordinates: 16°41′N 98°25′W
- Country: Mexico
- State: Guerrero
- Municipality: Ometepec
- Time zone: UTC-6 (Zona Centro)

Ometepec (Mixtec: Yucuvui, 'Two Hills') is a city and the seat of the municipality of Ometepec, in the southern Mexican state of Guerrero. Its name derives from the Nahuatl elements ome "two", tepetl "hill", and -c (locative suffix), together meaning "At the Two Hills".

== History ==
Ometepec was the capital of a strategic province of the Aztec Empire, which also included towns like Azoyú, San Luis Acatlán, Igualapa and Xochistlahuaca. Resources of the region included cotton, gold and cacao. Ometepec and Igualapa spoke Amuzgo in addition to their own language called Ayacastec, which has since gone extinct without being documented.
