= Puerto Marqués =

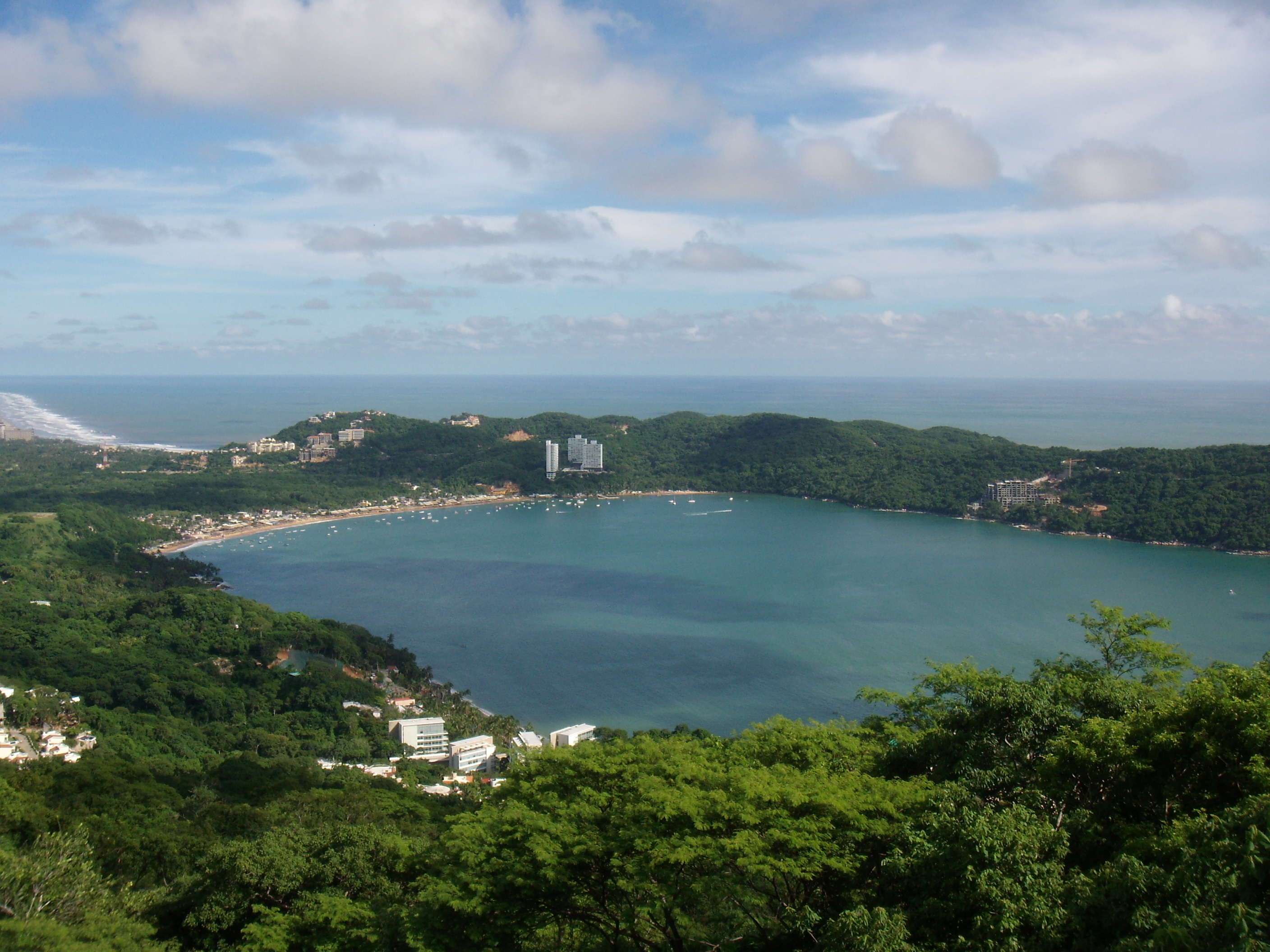
Puerto Marqués

Puerto Marqués is a bay located on the Pacific Coast in the Mexican State of Guerrero. Approximately 10 kilometers (6.5 miles) south of the city of Acapulco, it is the second closest Pacific port to Mexico City, approximately three hundred kilometres southwest, just north of the Isthmus of Tehuantepec. It has two main beaches for tourists and locals, Puerto Marqués Beach and Majahua Beach.

The oldest known pottery found in Mesoamerica, a culture area within the borders of Central America, was found at Puerto Marqués. "Pox" pottery discovered there has been dated to as early as 2400 BC, roughly 3500 years ago. During these times, most people were hunters and foragers, setting up camps and continuously migrating based on the seasons.

== Geography ==
Puerto Marqués is located just south of present day Acapulco, in the Mexican state of Guerrero. Nearly half the terrain is mountainous, with the remainder being a mix of flat or slightly elevated. The area is hot, with a tropical climate with distinct seasonal wet and dry periods. Temperatures typically range 22–32 °C (72–90 °F) on average all year around. Puerto Marqués is at the south end of a deep semi-circular (semi-enclosed) bay, and has a developing economy with buildings such as high rise hotels increasing in number.

== History ==
The development of pottery has been documented at many Mesoamerican sites, and is typically seen as a sign of settlement. But in the Archaic period to which the pottery found at Perto Marqués was dated, the role of foragers and hunters was more prominent than the sedentary life, as agricultural developments were yet to be made and resources were used up from site to site as mobile bands moved around the countryside. Pottery and ceramics have often been found at archaeological sites of centuries past, as they preserve well and can allow for research. These artifacts can occur in many different ways. The earliest level excavated at Puerto Marqués had no ceramics, but the level above that yielded "Pox" pottery, so-called because of the pockmarks on its interior surface where bits of fiber temper burned away in the firing process. Temper is the material that is added to raw clay in order to heighten the clay vessel's durability, and the kind of temper (fiber, grit, shell, etc.) is a way to diagnose common traits that could indicate shared information regarding a technology. "Pox" pottery bears a red slip on the exterior, similar to ceramics from the Initial Formative period found in coastal Soconusco, and also to pottery found in Ecuador; some of these finds are dated even earlier.

The pottery found at Puerto Marqués serves as a way to relate and understand the makers' social structures, and socio-economic status within the context of their lives long ago.

== Bibliography ==
- Bahn, Paul. The Atlas of World Archaeology. Andromeda Oxford Ltd., 2001. pp. 153–181
- Evans, Susan Toby. Ancient Mexico & Central America. Thames & Hudson Ltd., 2008.
- Murray, Tim. Encyclopedia of Archaeology, History and Discoveries. ABC-CLIO Inc., 2001. pp. 870–878
- Pearsall, Deborah. Encyclopedia of Archaeology. Academic Press, 2008. pp. 975–983
