= Tlacoachistlahuaca =

City in the Mexican state of Guerrero

- Municipal seat and city
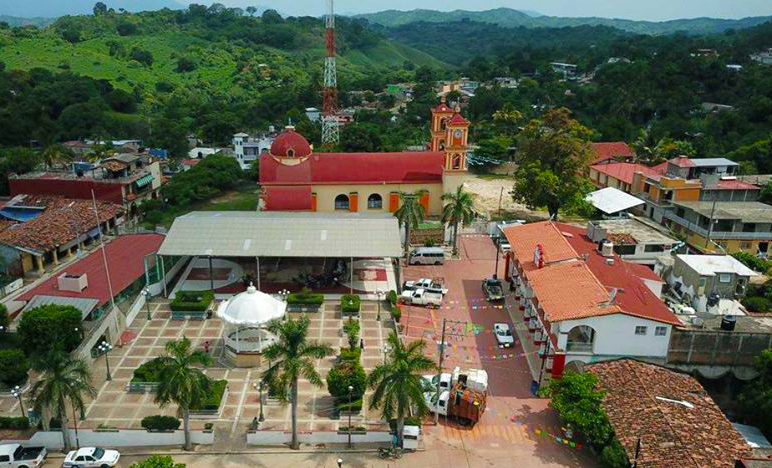

- Location in Mexico Tlacoachistlahuaca (Mexico)
- Coordinates: 16°48′40″N 98°18′0″W
- Country: Mexico
- State: Guerrero
- Municipality: Tlacoachistlahuaca
- Time zone: UTC-6 (Central)
- Website: https://www.tlacoachistlahuaca.gob.mx/

Tlacoachistlahuaca is a city and seat of the municipality of Tlacoachistlahuaca, in the state of Guerrero, southern Mexico.
