= Juchitán, Guerrero =

City in the Mexican state of Guerrero

Juchitán
- Municipal seat and city
- Location within Guerrero Location within Mexico
- Coordinates: 16°37′32″N 98°38′07″W
- Country: Mexico
- State: Guerrero
- Municipality: Juchitán
- Elevation: 140 m (460 ft)

Population (2005) (municipal seat v. municipality)
  - Urban: 2,944
  - Metro: 6,240
- Time zone: UTC-6 (Zona Centro)

Juchitán (Spanish pronunciation: [xutʃiˈtan]) is the seat of the municipality of Juchitán, in the Mexican state of Guerrero. It is part of the region of the state known as the Costa Chica.

In the 2005 INEGI census, the municipal seat reported a population of 2,944, compared to 6,240 for the municipality as a whole.
