= Marquelia =

City in the Mexican state of Guerrero

- Municipal seat and city
- Location in Mexico Marquelia (Mexico)
- Coordinates: 16°35′N 98°49′W
- Country: Mexico
- State: Guerrero
- Municipality: Marquelia
- Time zone: UTC-6 (Zona Centro)

Marquelia is a city and seat of the municipality of Marquelia, in the southern Mexican state of Guerrero.
