= Punta Maldonado =

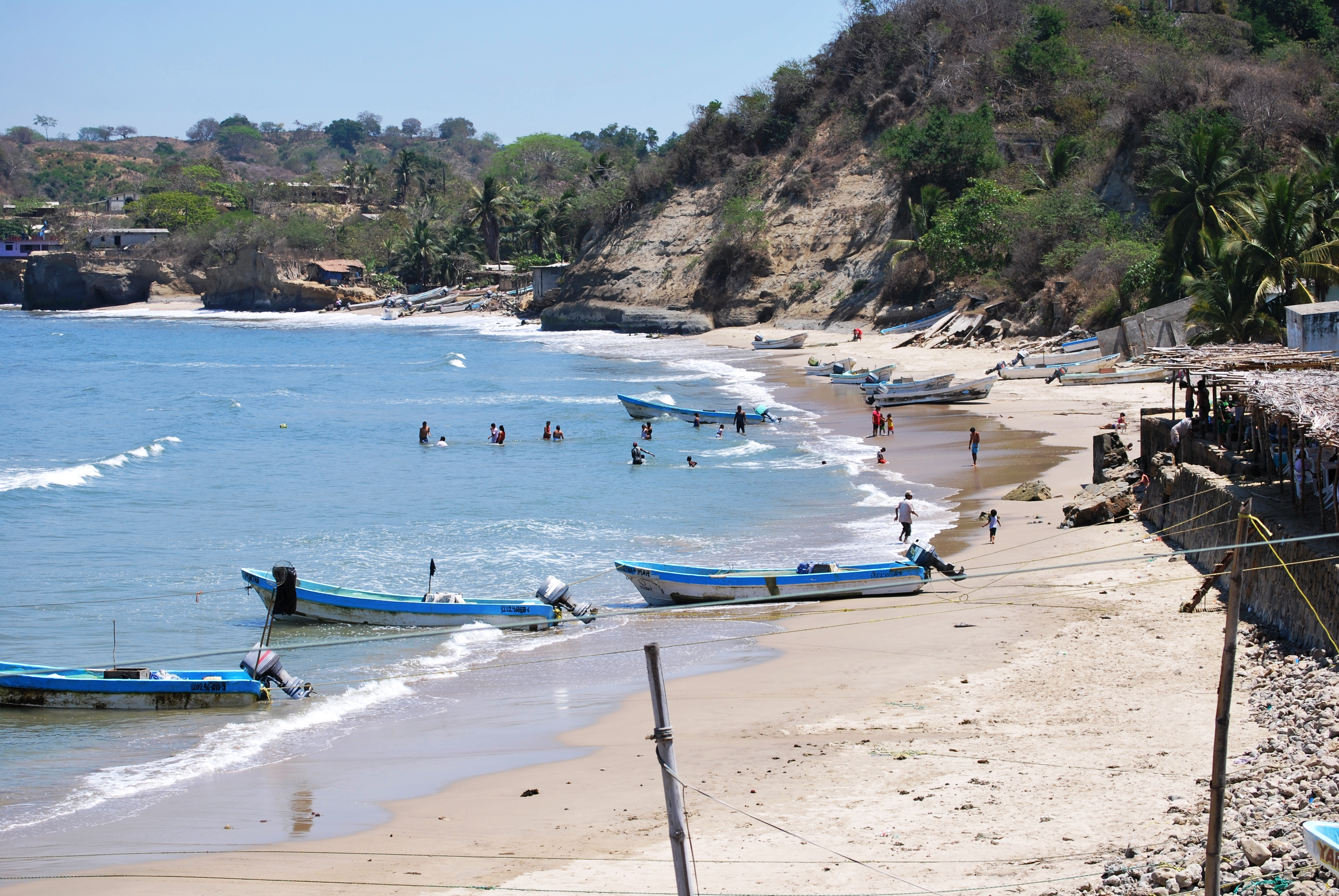
- Beach at Punta Maldonado

- Location within Guerrero Location within Mexico
- Coordinates: 16°19′34″N 98°34′01″W
- Country: Mexico
- State: Guerrero
- Municipality: San Nicolás

Population (2020)
  - Total: 848
- Time zone: UTC-6 (Central)
- Postal code: 41968

Punta Maldonado (also known as El Faro on account of the nearby lighthouse) is a small coastal community in the Mexican state of Guerrero. Previously located in the municipality of Cuajinicuilapa, it became part of the new municipality of San Nicolás upon its creation in 2021.

It is notable for its Afro-Mexican population. The local economy is centred on fishing, particularly for lobster. The beach is also an attractive tourist destination.

Located about one kilometre from the state border between Guerrero and Oaxaca, it is frequently used as a breakpoint by Mexico's Servicio Meteorológico Nacional and the U.S. National Hurricane Center.
