= Azoyú =

City in the Mexican state of Guerrero

Azoyu
- City
- Location in Mexico Azoyu (Mexico)
- Coordinates: 16°43′N 98°44′W
- Country: Mexico
- State: Guerrero
- Municipality: Azoyu

Azoyú is a city and seat of the municipality of Azoyú, in the southern Mexican state of Guerrero.
