= Igualapa =

City in the Mexican state of Guerrero

- Municipal seat and city
- Location in Mexico Igualapa (Mexico)
- Coordinates: 16°44′N 98°36′W
- Country: Mexico
- State: Guerrero
- Municipality: Igualapa
- Time zone: UTC-6 (Zona Centro)

Igualapa (Mixtec: Yutañeni, 'River of the Flesh of Heart') is a city and the seat of the municipality of Igualapa, in the Mexican state of Guerrero.

== Geography ==
Igualapa is one of the 81 municipalities in the state of Guerrero. The city is located in the Pacific coastal region southeast of Chilpancingo.

The city is known for its historic churches and shrines. They are visited by pilgrims from different parts of Mexico.
