= Demographics of Oaxaca =

see also Indigenous people of Oaxaca

The state of Oaxaca, Mexico has a total population of about 3.5 million, with women outnumbering men by 150,000 and about 60% of the population under the age of 30. It is ranked tenth in population in the country. Fifty three percent of the population lives in rural areas. Most of the state’s population growth took place between 1980 and 1990. Life expectancy is 71.7 for men and 77.4 for women, just under the national average. Births far outpace deaths. In 2007, there were 122,579 births and 19,439 deaths. Approximately 85% profess the Catholic faith.

Demographically, Oaxaca stands out due to the high percentage of indigenous peoples. It is estimated that at least a third are speakers of indigenous languages (with 5% not able to speak Spanish), accounting for 53% of Mexico’s total indigenous population. The state straddles two Mesoamerican cultural areas. The first extends into the state from the Mayan lands of Chiapas, Yucatan and Guatemala. The northeast of the state is part of the cultures of the Valley of Mexico, with historical influence seen from ancient cities such as Teotihuacan, Tula and Tenochtitlan. The main reason that indigenous languages and cultures have been able to survive here is the rugged terrain, which isolate communities. This also has the effect of dividing the state into small secluded communities, which have developed independently over time. There are 16 ethno linguistic groups recognized by the Instituto Nacional Indigenista who maintain their individual languages, customs and traditions well into the colonial period and to some extent to the present day. However, some studies put the number of cultures in the state as high as 4,000. This make Oaxaca the most ethnically complex of Mexico’s 31 states.

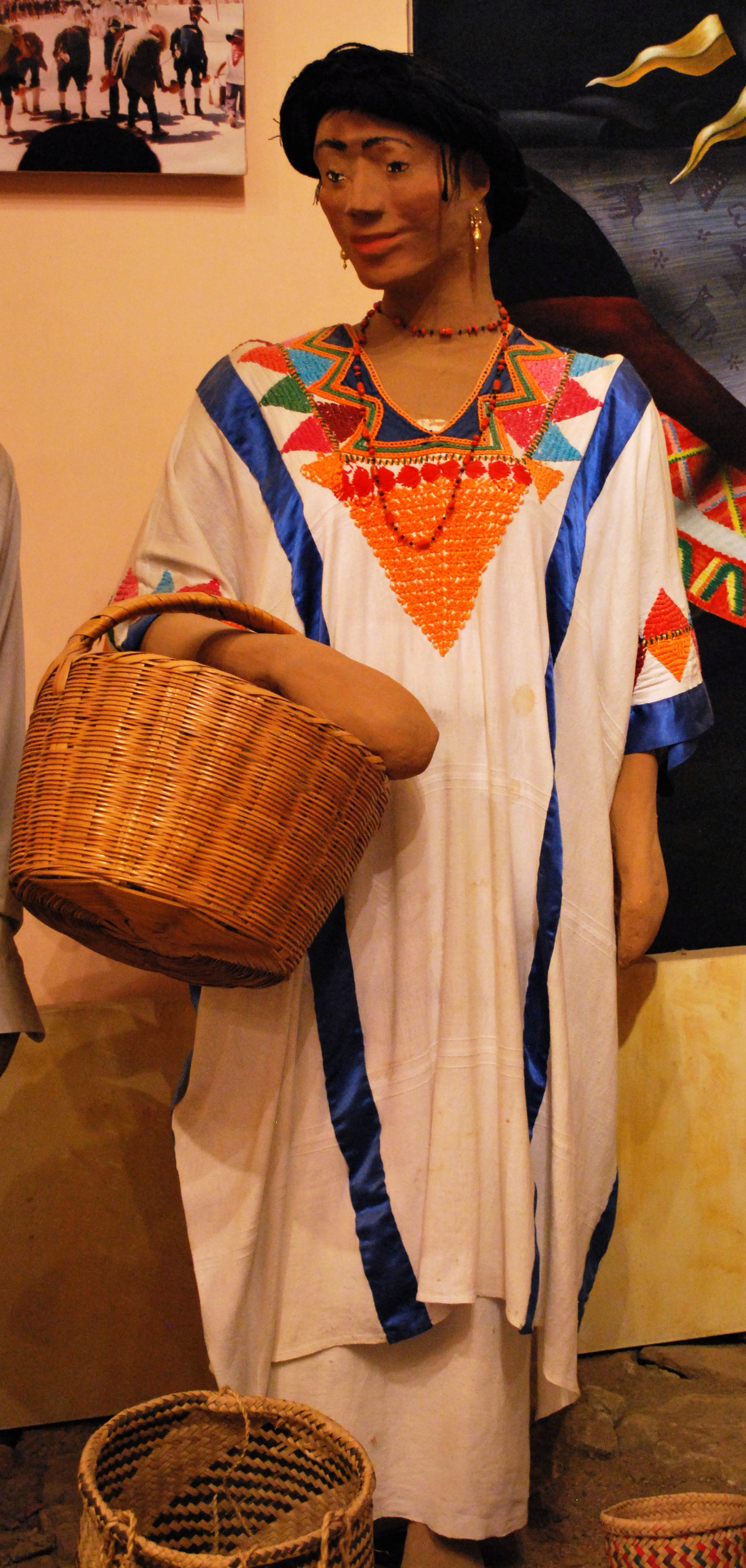
Wax manniquin of woman in Mixtec dress

Most indigenous in the state are either Zapotec or Mixtec. The Triques, Amuszos and Cuicatecos are related to the Mixtecs and have similar languages, The Chochopopolocas and Ixcatecos are similar to the Mazatecos; the Zoques are related to the Mixes, and the Chatinos are related to the Zapotecs. Unrelated groups include the Chontals, Chinatecos, Huaves and Nahuas. As of 2005, a total of 1,091,502 people were counted as speaking an indigenous language.

== Indigenous Groups ==
The largest indigenous group in the state are the Zapotecs at about 350,000 people or about 31% of the total indigenous population. The Zapotec have an extremely long history in the Central Valleys region and unlike other indigenous groups, do not have a migration story. For them, they have always been here. Zapotecs have always called themselves Be'ena'a, which means The People Of The Clouds. Zapotec territory extends in and around the Central Valleys region of the state, around the capital city of Oaxaca. The Zapotec language has historically been and is still the most widely spoken in the state, with four dialects that correspond to the four subdivisions of these people: Central Valleys and Isthmus, the Sierra de Ixtlan, Villa Alta and Coapan. Zapotec communities can be found in 67 municipalities. The various Zapotec dialects account for 64 of the total 173 still surviving forms of Oto-Manguean.

The second largest group are the Mixtecs at just over 240,000 people or 27% of the indigenous population. These people established themselves in the northwest of Oaxaca and far southern Puebla over 3,000 years ago, making them one of the oldest communities in the region. These same people put pressure on the Zapotec kingdoms until the Spanish conquered both peoples in the 16th century. Mixtec territory is divided into three sub regions. The Upper Mixteca covers 38 municipalities and is the most populated region. The Lower Mixteca includes 31 municipalities. The Coastal Mixtecs are a small group. Today, the Mixtecs call themselves Ñuu Savi, the people of the rain. The Mixtecan language family, as one of the largest and most diverse families in the Oto-Manguean group, includes three groups of languages: Mixtec, Cuicatec, and Trique.

The Mazatecos number at about 165,000 or 15% of Oaxaca’s indigenous population. (perfil soc) These people occupy the northernmost area of the state, in the upper Sierra Madre Oriental mountains and the Papaloapan Basin. The Mazatecos call themselves Ha shuta enima, which means People of Custom. Some historians believe that the Mazatecos descend from the Nonoalca-Chichimecas, who migrated south from Tula early in the 12th century. While most live in Oaxaca, a significant number of Mazatecos also occupy Veracruz and Puebla.

The Chinantecos account for about ten percent of Oaxaca’s indigenous people, numbering at about 104,000. They inhabit the Chinantla region of north central Oaxaca near the border of Veracruz. The Chinanteco language has as many as 14 different dialects and is part of the Oto-Manguean linguistic group. The Chinantecos presently inhabit an area in which archaeologists have located temples that were apparently used as ceremonial centers, and where prisoners were supposedly sacrificed during the most important celebrations of the year. Historians believe that those living in this region struggled to maintain their independence against sudden and numerous attacks by the Zapotecs, Mixtecs, Mixes and Aztecs. The latter, led by Moctezuma I, finally conquered the Chinantla region during the 15th century.

The Mixe people account for another ten percent of the indigenous population at just over 103,000 people. The Mixe are an isolated group in the northeastern part of the state, close to the border of Veracruz. Their region includes 19 municipalities and 108 communities. The Mixes call themselves Ayuuk, which means The People. It is unknown where the Mixe migrated from, with some speculating from as far as Peru, but they arrived in waves from 1300 to 1533. They came into conflict with the Mixtecs and Zapotecs, but allied themselves with the Zapotecs against the Aztecs, then resisted the Spanish. The Mixe language has seven dialects and this group has more monolingual speakers than any other indigenous group.

The Chatino people number at about 42,477 and live in southwestern Oaxaca. Their language has seven dialects and is part of the Oto-Manguean language group. It is believed that these were one of the first indigenous groups to inhabit what is now the state of Oaxaca. The Chatinos call themselves Kitse cha'tnio, which means Work of the Words. In ancient times, they were a military oriented group but the Mixtecs eventually defeated them some years before the arrival of the Spanish.

The Trique people number at 18,292 and inhabit an area of 193 square miles (500 km^{2}) in the southern Sierra Madre Mountains in the westernmost part of Oaxaca. After these people arrived to Oaxaca, they were subdued by the Zapotecs and the Mixtecs. In the 15th century, Aztec armies defeated them, then demanding tribute.

The Huave people number 15,324. and cover a large part of Oaxaca, mostly in the Isthmus of Tehuantepec. While not definitively determined, they are considered to have come from Nicaragua or possibly Peru, arriving by sea. From the Isthmus area, the ancient Huave conquered a large expanse of Oaxacan territory, now called the Jalapa del Marques. In the 15th century, Aztec armies invaded both Huave and Zapotec lands, forcing both kingdoms to pay tribute. Weakened, the Huaves were pushed back towards the Isthmus by the Zapotecs, where their modern descendants are still found. Modern Huaves call themselves Mero ikooc, which means “the true us.”

The Cuicatecos number at 12,128 and live in northwestern Oaxaca. Little is known about the history of these people because the Spanish destroyed many of the Mixtec and Zapotec maps and codices related to them. Archeological research speculates that they are descended from the Toltecs is arrived here after the fall of Tula in 1064. The fertile lands of the Cuicatlan River made this group a target for other groups, eventually forcing them to become a peripheral part of the Mixtecs. However, when the Aztecs arrived in 1456, the Cuicatecos formed an alliance with them.

The Zoque, also called the Aiyuuk, are mostly located in Chiapas but a branch of them, numbering at about 10,000 lives in Oaxaca. Their language is closely related to the Mayan-Chique family. The Zoque call themselves O'deput, which means People of the Language. Many of their customs, social organizations, religion beliefs, and way of life were identical to those of the Mixe community, with whom they probably share a common origin in Central America.

The Amuzgos number at 4,819 and inhabit the border region of southeastern Guerrero and southwestern Oaxaca. Only about 20% of the total Amuzgo population lives in the state of Oaxaca. The Amuzgos call themselves Tzjon non, which means People of the Textiles. The Aztecs partially conquered these people in the 15th century, but the Amuzgos rebelled and Aztec domination as never complete. The Amuzgos of Oaxaca primarily live in Putla and San Pedro Amuzgos.

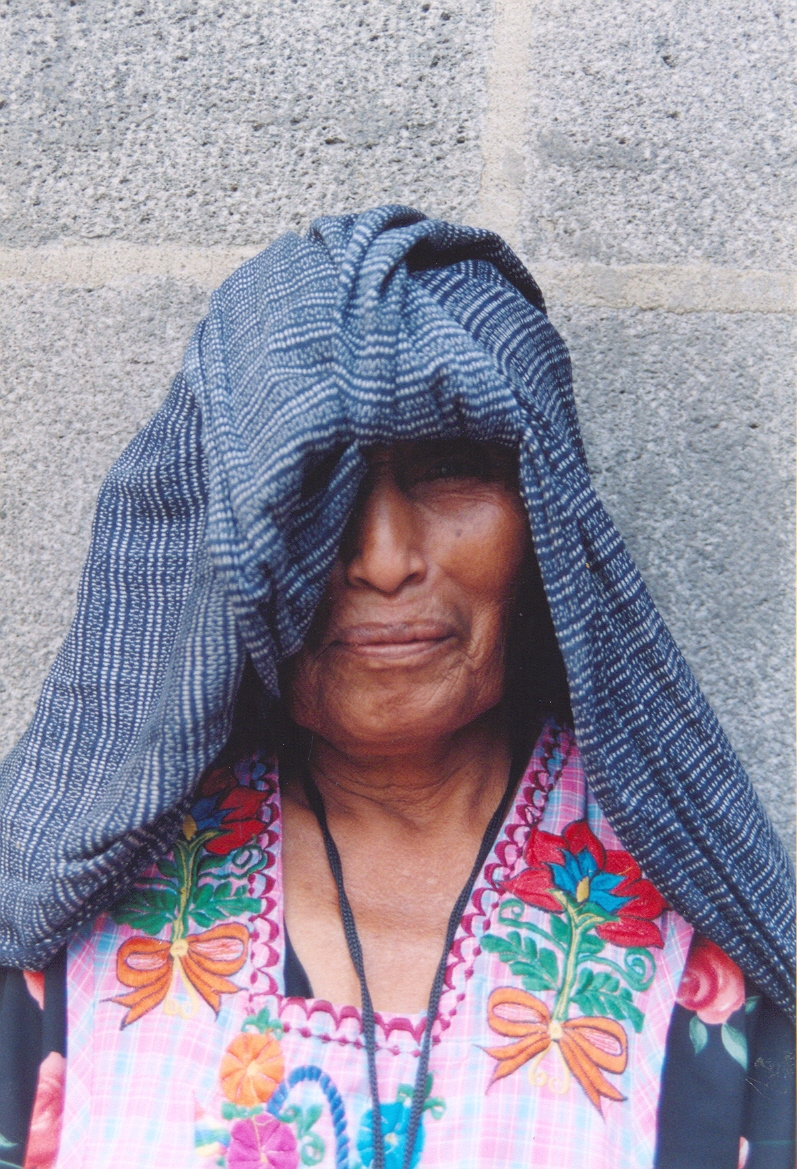
Popoloca woman

The Chontales of Oaxaca (to distinguish them from other groups called “Chontal”) number 4,610 and live in the far south of the state. Their language has two major dialects and is a member of the Hokan language family, which is more widely represented in the southwest U.S. and northwest Mexico. The Chontales of Oaxaca refer to themselves as Slijuala xanuc, which means Inhabitants of the Mountains. The origins of these people have not been conclusively determined but some believe they originally came from Nicaragua, moving north due to warfare. There was a Kingdom of the Chontals in the 14th century, but the Zapotecs eventually defeated them.

The Tacuates number 1,725 and occupy two of Oaxaca’s municipalities. They speak a variant of the Mixtec language. Their name probably comes from Nahuatl and means “land of the serpents.”

The Chocho or Chocholtec number at 524 and live in the northern zone of the Upper Mixteca region, near the Puebla border. These people call themselves “Runixa ngiigua,” which means those who speak the language. The language belongs to the Oto-Manguean family. The lands was conquered by the Mixtecs in the mid 15th century, then soon after by the Aztecs. The area is rich in archeological sites.

The Ixcatecos, which number 207, are found only in Santa María de Ixcatlán in the north of the state. This is one of the most arid, eroded and poorest regions of Mexico. The Ixcatecos once occupied seven other areas but these were probably abandoned due to the lack of water and agricultural failure. Their territory is inaccessible, which allowed them to remain independent until the Aztecs finally overwhelmed them just the before the Spanish Conquest.

The Popolocas only number 61 and are scattered in various areas of Oaxaca. The name comes from Aztec, who used it to describe non Nahuatl languages, which were unintelligible to them. It came to mean “stranger” and “barbaric” and “unintelligent,” a use that the Spanish continued. The Popolucas call themselves Homshuk, which means God of Corn. Today, the Popoloca population is divided in three fractions speaking six primary dialects.

There is also a small population of Nahuatl speaking peoples in the border area with Puebla. These are descendants of Aztec and other Nahua groups with invaded the area in the latter pre-Hispanic period.
