= Amuzgo textiles =

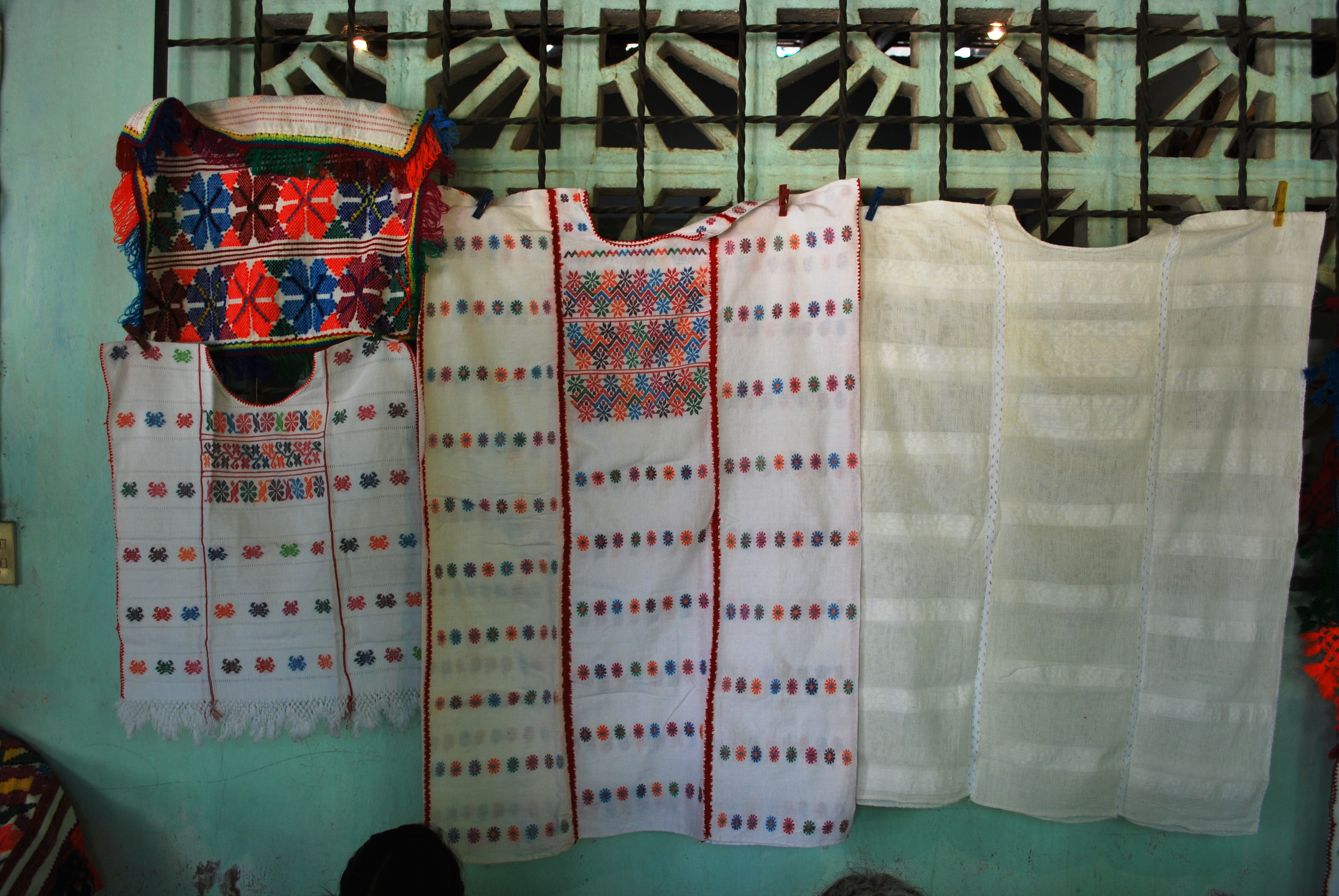
Amuzgo hand woven huipils on display at the Xochistlahuaca Community Museum

Amuzgo textiles are those created by the Amuzgo indigenous people who live in the Mexican states of Guerrero and Oaxaca. The history of this craft extends to the pre-Columbian period, which much preserved, as many Amuzgos, especially in Xochistlahuaca, still wear traditional clothing. However, the introduction of cheap commercial cloth has put the craft in danger as hand woven cloth with elaborate designs cannot compete as material for regular clothing. Since the 20th century, the Amuzgo weavers have mostly made cloth for family use, but they have also been developing specialty markets, such as to collectors and tourists for their product.

One major player in this development is the Liaa’ Ljaa’ cooperative, which seeks to not only commercialize Amuzgo weaving but also preserve designs and traditional techniques, partnering with organizations such as the Universidad Autónoma Metropolitana (UAM) in Azcapotzalco. Most weavings are still done with traditional designs and techniques and with natural fibers, principally cotton, and dyes.

== The Amuzgos ==
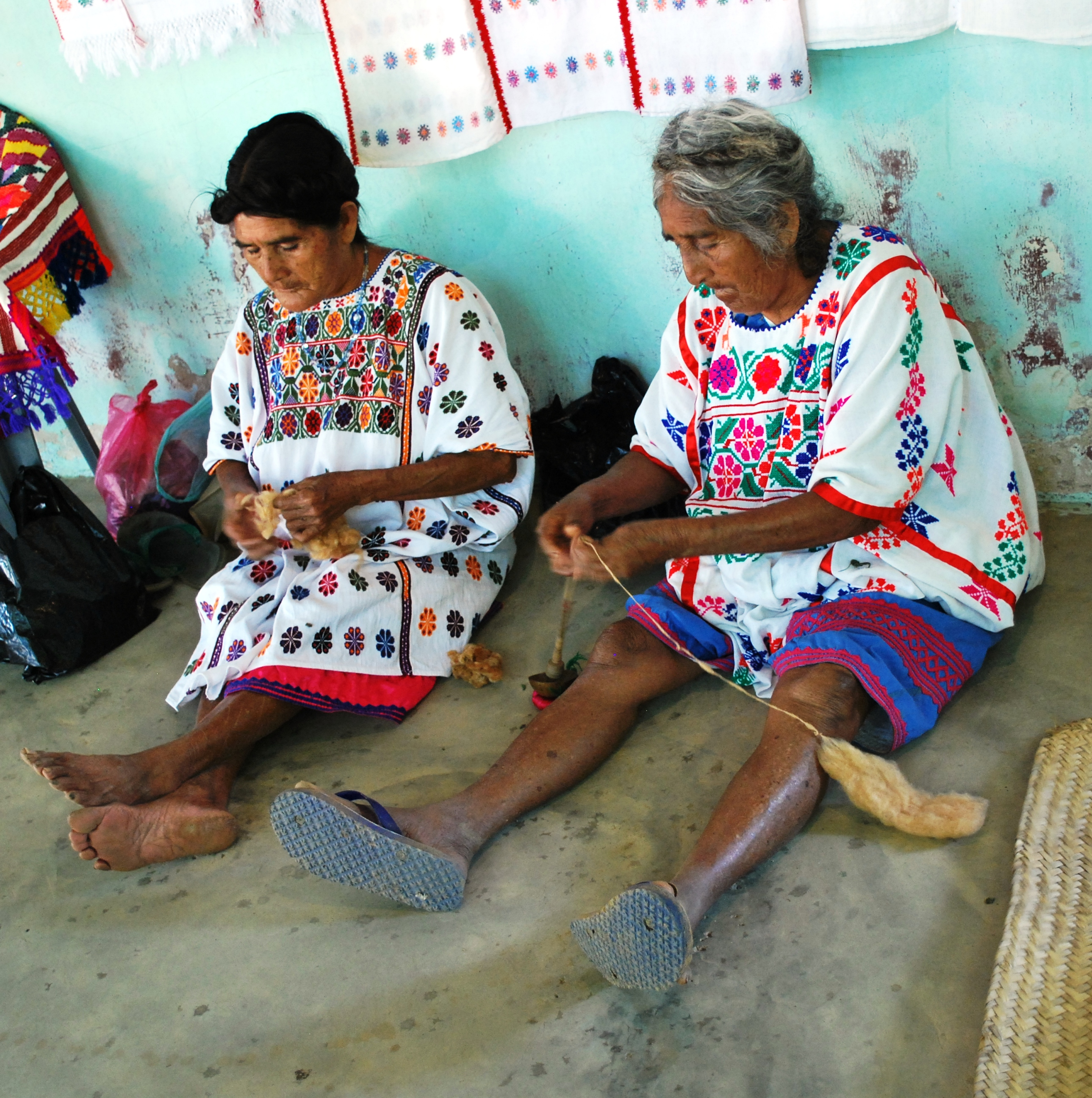
Amuzgo women dressed in huipils preparing thread for weaving

The Amuzgos live in the border region of southeastern Guerrero and southwestern Oaxaca, with about eighty percent in Guerrero. Most live in the municipalities of San Pedro Amuzgos, Putla and Santa María Ipalapa in Oaxaca and Xochistlahuaca and Ometepec in Guerrero. The region is hot with rugged terrain with tropical forest whose leaves drop during the dry season. It has various small rivers and streams. The Amuzgo practice subsistence agriculture based on corn, beans and chili peppers with some other cash crops such as sesame seed and tropical fruits. The region is not purely Amuzgo as Triquis, Tlapanecs, Mixtecs, Chatinos and Nahuas.

One name the Amuzgo have for themselves is Tzjon non, especially in San Pedro Amuzgos, which means “people of the textiles.” There are about 35,000 speakers of the Amuzgo language. The religion is Catholicism with indigenous elements such as a belief in good and evil spirits which can cause or cure disease, rain or drought and more. The largest community of Amuzgos is in the municipality of Xochistlahuaca in Guerrero. Many houses are of adobe on narrow streets on steep hills. The Amuzgos here have maintained most of their culture in its food, family structure, language and religious beliefs. Since 1996, Xochistlahuaca has hosted a regional gathering of Amuzgos to promote regional social, political and economic development. The town also has a community museum which has a number of pre Hispanic pieces. The children receive primary school education in both Spanish and Amuzgo.

Textiles are an important part of Amuzgo culture and economy, although other handcrafts such as ceramics. Although weaving is painstaking and time-consuming, most Amuzgo women do it along with farming and household chores because it brings in money to the household, and the labors of men in the fields growing corn, beans, squash and cotton is not enough. Cotton is highly valued by the Amuzgos, not only for its economic value but also because it is considered to be in harmony with the human body and soft to the touch. Most of Xochistlahuaca inhabitants, especially the women, still wear traditional garb. The most notable of these is the huipil, a kind of long tunic, which is called “cheyno” in Amuzgo. This word means a cloth that covers a woman, and is considered to be an expression of the wearer. There are two types of huipils: everyday and those for special occasions, and both can be elaborately decorated.

== Preservation and marketing ==
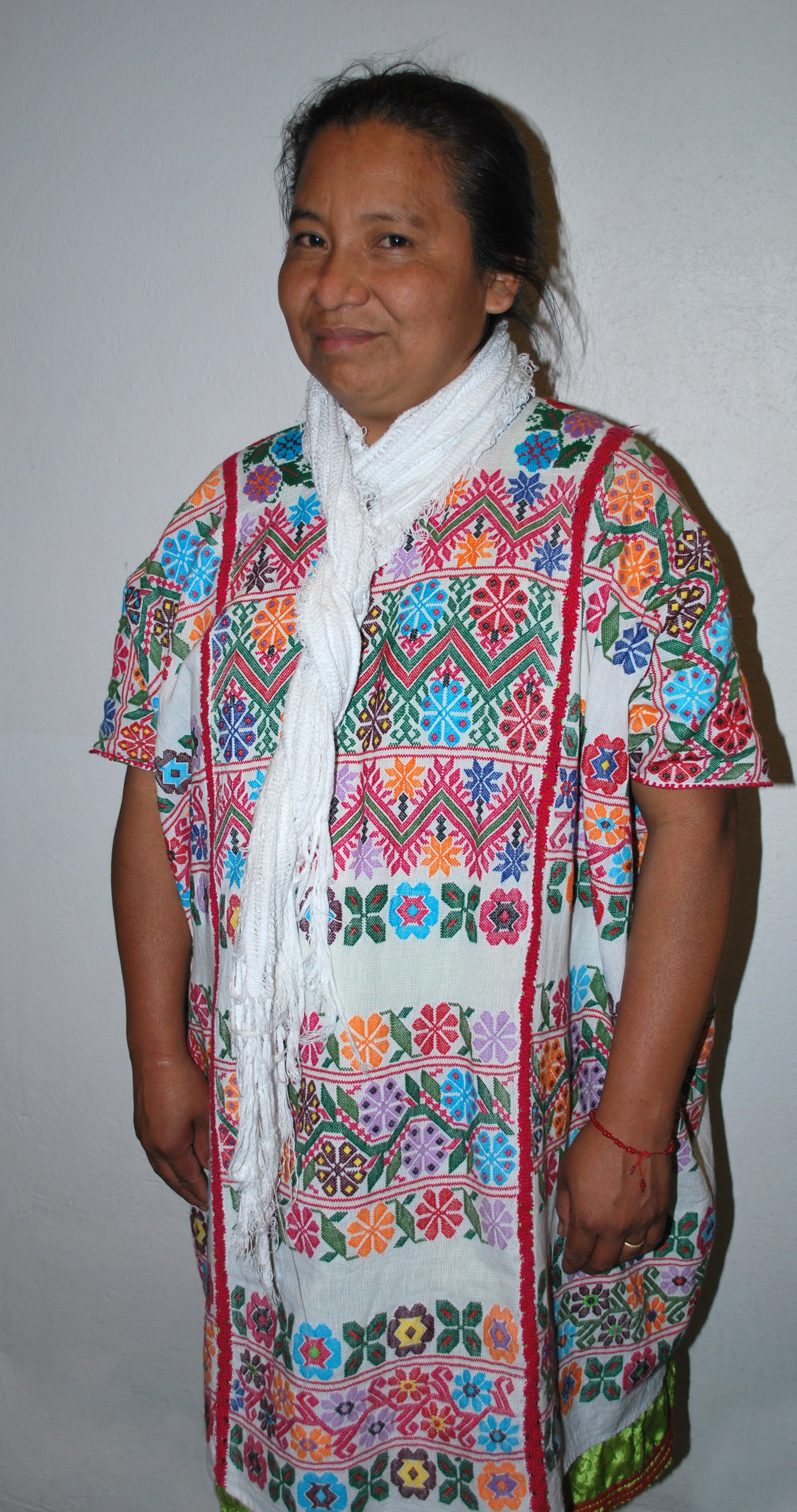
Juana Santa Ana Guerrero of the Liaa' Ljaa' at the Museo de Arte Popular.

Most textiles made in Amuzgo homes is still for family use, especially huipils. However, the craft is in danger because machine made cloth is much cheaper, and as everyday clothing, traditional hand woven cloth cannot compete in the market outside the home. Starting in the latter 20th century, huipils and other traditional clothing for sale has been targeted to specialty markets such as to scholars like anthropologists, rich Mexican woman who wear them for civic holidays and to tourists from various parts of the world including those who travel to Xochistlahuaca to buy.

Amuzgo textile production and efforts at preservation are strongest in Xochistlahuaca, with the oldest and most complex designs mostly known only to the oldest weavers in this municipality. The weavers of this town have made efforts to preserve these designs and pass them onto the younger generations. One major development in the preservation and promotion of Amuzgo textiles was the formation of the Liaa’ Ljaa’ cooperative in 1996. The name is from Amuzgo and means "materials of flowers". The cooperative today have fifty nine members representing fifty nine families, which totals about 160 people, only forty of which are men. This cooperative exists to avoid middlemen, selling more directly to the market for higher prices as well as promote efforts to preserve traditional designs and techniques using natural fibers and dyes. The group weaves elaborate huipils, blouses, skirts, rebozos, bedcovers, tablecloths and napkins, and works together to commercialize them. However, the most important item remains the huipil both for use by the Amuzgo women and by collectors.

The Amuzgo have taken steps to have their weavings received a “denomination of origin” so that this style of weaving is only authentically produced in Amuzgo territory, similar to the denomination of origin afforded to Talavera pottery. They have also worked to create new designs and new items, such as pants and rugs for commercialization purposes with support from government and other sources. One of these is the cooperation between Liaa’ Ljaa’ and the Universidad Autónoma Metropolitana-Azcapotzalco, which aims to preserve Amuzgo textiles and other aspects of Amuzgo culture. The UAM library has a collection of original textiles, along with a catalog of 244 traditional designs used on clothing and other textiles, with photographs in the possession of the Xochistlahuaca Community Museum. The collaboration works to preserve traditional designs which are not often done because they are complex, time-consuming and/or costly to make.

Weavers from Xochistlahuaca have received support and awards for their work. Sources of support include Programa Nacional de Arte Popular of the DGCP, Comisión Nacional para el Desarrollo de los Pueblos Indígenas, and the Programa de Fondos Culturales. The last has a program called "Fortalecimiento Cultural" which aims to recompile and register traditional designs to keep the oldest and most complicated from being forgotten.

A number of weavers from the community have received prizes for their work including the 2004 Premio Nacional de Ciencias y Artes awarded to the cooperative as a whole. The work has been exhibited in museums such as the Museo Regional de Guerrero. Estela Pineda participated in the XVI Muestra Iberoamericana de Artesanía in Spain with a huipil made of coyochi cotton colored with vegetable dyes which was recognized as best textile. Plants used included indigo, marigold flowers, roses and others. Florentina Lopez de Jesus won second place at the UNESCO handcraft prize in 2001 for Latin American and the Caribbean.

== Designs ==
The embroidery and weaving designs of Amuzgo textiles have significance and are passed down from generation to generation. The designs found on the cloth made in Xochistlahuaca is some of the most traditional. The patterns identify various Amuzgo communities as well as Amuzgo identity, with the designs considered to be a kind of “alphabet” by Amuzgo weavers. This use of design is part of this people’s cultural heritage along with the weaving process itself. Some of the designs can be traced back to images found on codices and pre Hispanic cultures. Most of the designs are based on the flora and fauna of the Costa Chica region of Guerrero, especially those near Xochistlahuaca. These include petate mat patterns, fretwork, suns, stars, mountains, rivers, dogs, horses, donkeys, turtles, water bugs, birds, double headed eagles and various flowers. There are mathematical formulas that create patterns such as “pata de perro” (a kind of leaf that grows along the Santa Catarina River), “flores de piedra” (stone flowers), curvas de cola de tortuga (turtle tail curls), “flores de pina” (pineapple flowers) and “patas de gato” (cats’ feet). These patterns can be found on huipils, blouses, skirts, napkins, rebozos and dresses. An S pattern represents the feminine and indirectly, the earth. Another common motif is the double headed eagle, which is based on a number of myths of the region. There are also newer designs which were created with the help of Beatriz Jimenez, a designer at UAM.

== Process ==
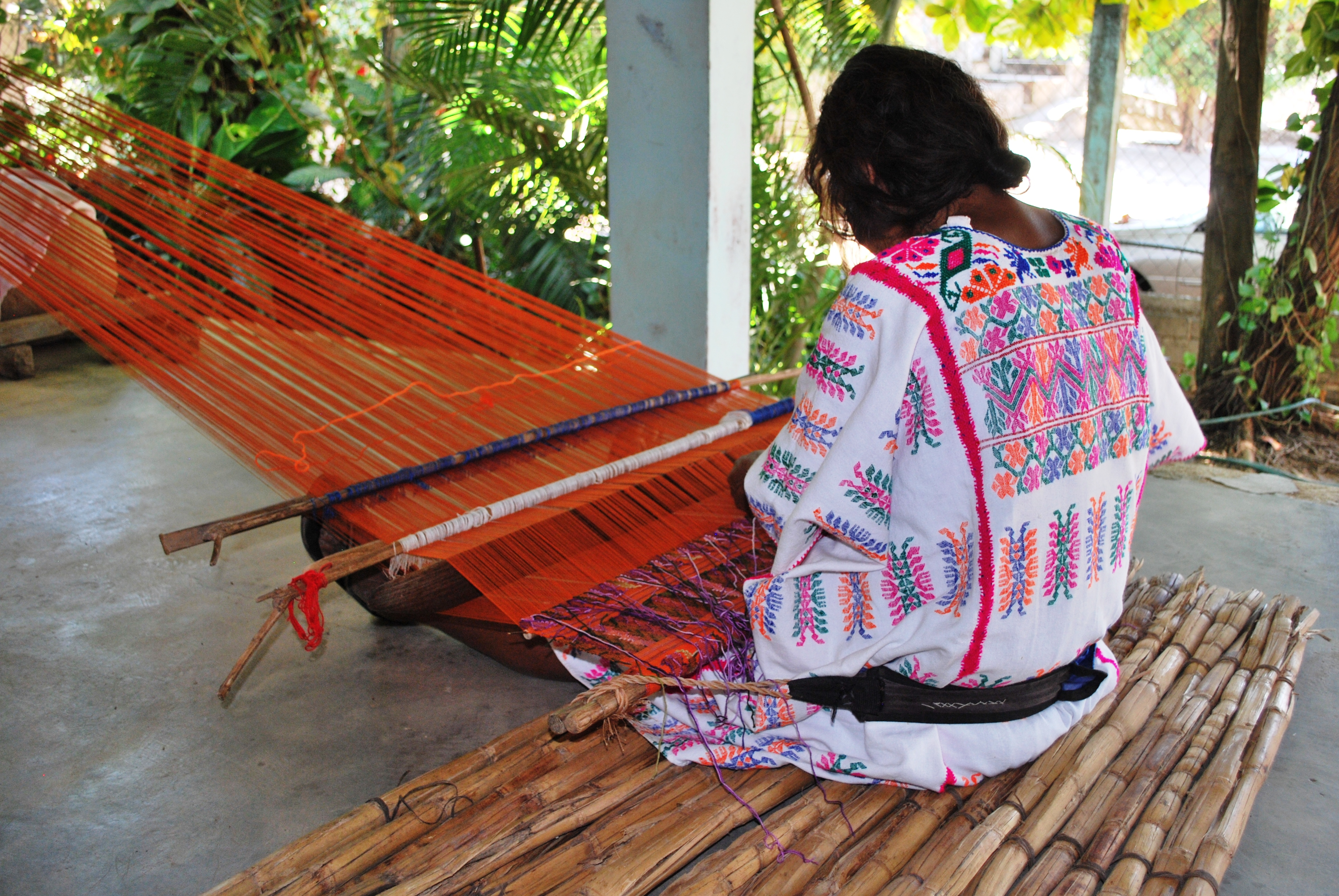
Amuzgo woman weaving a rebozo on a backstrap loom

Like many other indigenous communities, people learn to create handcrafts as young children, with most boys learning to weave hammocks and nets, but it is the girls that learn to make cloth on a backstrap loom, learning from their mothers and grandmothers. Most of the thread, the dyes and the tools used for weaving fabric are natural and include cotton, wood and even bird bones which function much like needles. White cotton is increasingly used but the most traditional variety is called “coyuche” which is naturally brown. The name comes from “coyote” as the color is similar to that to the animal. This variety of cotton is not used anywhere else in the world, but its use is less than the past and not used at all in many works. This cotton is grown by the Amuzgo themselves, along with other crops. Cotton fiber is also often mixed with the fiber of a local plant called cacaloxuchitl. Dyes are made from cochineal, branches from the nanche (Byrsonima crassifolia) and almond tree and hay.

Generally, huipils made from cloth 45 cm wide take about four months to complete, working four hours a day. It sells for about 2,500 pesos. All pieces are unique with no two exactly the same.

The process of converting cotton into cloth is nearly the same as it was in the pre Hispanic period. The process starts with cleaning and beating the raw cotton fibers, then spinning them into thread using a supported spindle called a malacate (large whorl-less spindle which spins in a small cup). The thread is wound into skeins of yarn and dyed.

The warp threads are wound, which determines the length of the cloth to be made as well as some of the colors that will be used. The weaving is done on a backstrap loom. One end of the warp threads are fastened to a wooden rod and the other end is held by a wood stick or rod which is then fastened to the weaver by a belt that goes around her back. The weaving is done by raising half the warp threads to create a space or shed through which the shuttle passes. To create two different sheds, the weaver uses a wood pole called a shed rod that half the warp passes over and string heddles tied to another wooden rod, that the other half of the warp passes through. Some designs are woven into the fabric by introducing an extra weft thread that may be brightly colored. There are four main weaving techniques. Simple huipils are made in brocade with extra or supplementary weft threads seen on both sides of the cloth. Napkins and tablecloths have one side completely smooth. A second type of huipil has areas of gauze weave (gauze is an open cloth stabilized with leno twists). The fourth is an all over gauze weave called concha de armadillos with the design in the form of a diamond.

Cloth destined for huipils is joined together by complicated and decorative hand stitching. In addition to designs woven into the cloth, clothing, napkins and more are further embellished with embroidery with designs depicting geometric figures, animals. Most embroidery is done using commercial thread as it is cheaper.

== Florentina López de Jesús ==
The best known Amuzgo weaver from Xochistlahuaca is Florentina López de Jesús. Like most other girls in her area, she watched her mother weave as she sat by her side playing with skeins of cotton yarn. When she was an adult her weaving skills came to include techniques such as taffeta, simple weave, taletón (a variation of taffeta)and variations of gauze. Her specialty is gauze brocade in which various colored brocading weft threads are introduced to form designs. At first, her production was generally sold among her friends or done by special order as she had no permanent shop. After winning awards for her work starting in 1980, she began selling her pieces in Ometepec. Major awards include “Por siempre el rebozo” in 1991 and Las Manos de México in 1994 in the category of brocade.
