= Florentina López de Jesús =

Amuzgo weaver

- Born: July 25, 1939; Xochistlahuaca, Guerrero, Mexico
- Died: February 9, 2014 (aged 74)
- Occupation: weaver

Florentina López de Jesús (July 25, 1939 – February 9, 2014) was a traditional Amuzgo weaver from Xochistlahuaca, Guerrero, Mexico. Her work was recognized by various awards.

== Life ==
López de Jesús was born into a poor Amuzgo family in Xochislahuaca, in the Costa Chica region of the state of Guerrero, Mexico. Like most Amuzgo girls, she learned to weave cotton garments by watching and imitating her mother starting at age six. When she was fourteen, she went to work as a maid to help the family's finances. She was still able to weave during this time, but not as much as she would have liked. The experience gave her the idea of creating pieces to sell in nearby Ometepec, not just for family use.

Known as “Tina” by friends and family, she worked to promote Amuzgo textiles and the rights of indigenous women. In 1969, she founded the first cooperative for women weavers in her hometown, called La Flor de Xochistlahuaca, which is still functioning. In 1971 she was elected as a community representative for the municipality of Xochistlahuaca. She gave formal and informal classes to others in the town and region and participated in a class on natural dyes given by Spanish expert Ana Roquer in 1994 and a course in spinning in 1995.

López de Jesús died at age 74 from a heart attack. Most of the town attended her funeral as well as a representative from the INBA. She was buried in the community cemetery.

== Career ==
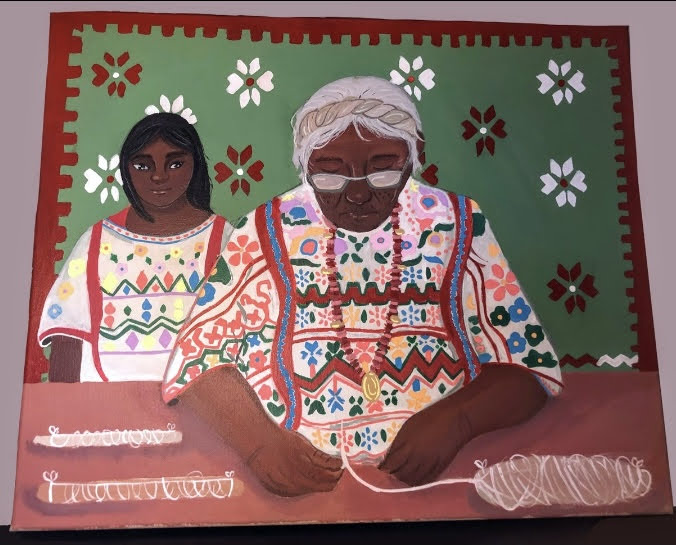
Acrylic painting on canvas of Florentina López de Jesús

López de Jesús began her weaving career by selling pieces in the nearby city of Ometepec to earn money to help her family. Her work caught the attention of FONART and from 1969 and 1971, she sold her work through this government agency. She was involved in production from the growing of cotton to creating the final product, researching methods of weaving and dyeing with plants and minerals from the area around Xochistlahuaca. She also attended seminars on natural dyes and mastered various weaving techniques such as taffeta, simple weave, taletón (a variation of taffeta) and variations of gauze.

Her particular specialty was the weaving of brocade in white and coyuche (a local brown variation) cotton with the design woven in using variously colored weft threads. In addition to traditional huipils, she produces napkins, tablecloths, rebozos and bedspreads. By special order, she has made garments with other fibers such as silk and synthetics.

Her work has won a number of awards including 2nd place Gran Premio de Arte Popular, FONART in 1987, 1st place Gran Premio de Arte Popular, FONART in 1991 and Premio Nacional de Artesanias de SECOFI in 1993. In 2001 she won the UNESCO Handcrafts Prize.

Her work has been exhibited in museums and various international exhibits, including one in Spain in 2001 that attracted the attention of Queen Sofia.

== See also ==
List of Mexican artisans
