= Kenia Hernández =

Mexican human rights activist

- Born: Xochistlahuaca, Guerrero, Mexico
- Occupation: Lawyer
- Organization: Colectivo Libertario Zapata Vive
- Known for: Defending land rights and political prisoners
- Criminal charges: Robbery with violence
- Criminal penalty: 10 years imprisonment
- Criminal status: Detained

Kenia Inés Hernández Montalván is a Mexican Amuzgo lawyer and human rights activist. She is the coordinator of the Colectivo Libertario Zapata Vive, a peasant movement that defending land rights in Mexico, as well as a member of the Movimiento Nacional por la Libertad de las y los Presos Políticos, a non-governmental organisation advocating for political prisoners. Hernández has been imprisoned since 2020 and has been described as a prisoner of conscience by human rights organisations.

== Arrests and imprisonment ==
Hernández was born in Xochistlahuaca, Guerrero, Mexico into an indigenous Amuzgo family.

Hernández was arrested on 6 June 2020 while peacefully demonstrating at the Hortaliza–Valle de Bravo toll booth in the State of Mexico. She and around 40 other protesters were demanding the release of two young people from the Colectivo Libertario Zapata Vive, who had been detained for the previous nine months. Hernández was held in preventative detention for several days at Chiconautla Prison in Ecatepec de Morelos without being informed of the charges against her. On 11 June, she was informed that she had been charged with aggravated robbery, and was released on parole with conditions including not to demonstrate at toll booths.

On 18 October 2020, Hernández was arrested again, in Amozoc de Mota, Puebla, by the police of the Attorney General's Office of the State of Mexico under an arrest warrant issued on 3 August. Witnesses stated that violence was used in Hernández's arrest. On 19 October, it was reported that she had been transferred to Almoloya de Juárez on charges of "robbery with violence".

On 25 October 2020, shortly before she was due to be released, Hernández was arrested again on a new arrest warrant on charges of "attacks on communication routes" from the Attorney General of Mexico. The prosecution asked for a five-year and five-month sentence for a protest Hernández took part in at the La Venta–Acapulco toll booth in Guerrero. She was transferred to the Centro Federal de Readaptación Social Femenil No. 16 in Coatlán del Río, Morelos.

On 5 February 2022, Hernández was sentenced to 10 years and six months' imprisonment for "robbery with violence" against Concesionaria Mexiquense SA de CV. On 11 March, she was sentenced to 11 years and three months in prison on charges of damaging a toll booth in the State of Mexico. Her lawyers argued that the crime was fabricated, presenting evidence stating that she was 600 kilometres away from the toll booth at the time of the crime.

On 25 March 2022, Hernández was informed of a new investigation about "attacks on communication routes" in Guerrero, meaning she was investigated for the same crime in four states: Guerrero, Morelos, Guanajuato and Mexico.

On 28 January 2024, Hernández was transferred from a prison in Coatlán del Río to Chiconautla state prison in Ecatepec, State of Mexico.

== Response ==
Human rights organisations and international bodies stated that Hernández had been the victim of mistreatment in prison, including discrimination, limited communication with her family and lawyers, and lack of access to health care and food. Her health was reported to be in serious decline.

On 8 June 2020, the National Human Rights Commission issued a statement concerning Hernández, demanding that authorities respect due process. Following her second arrest in October 2020, it demanded respect for her human rights and presumption of innocence.

On 25 May 2022, the Inter-American Commission on Human Rights expressed concern that Hernández was part of a trend of the criminalisation of human rights activists in the region.

On 18 August 2022, Mary Lawlor, the United Nations Special Rapporteur on human rights defenders, demanded that the Mexican government immediately release Hernández due to the difficulties she experienced in prison in addition to her belief that the charges against Hernández "appear to be a direct reprisal for her legitimate and peaceful activities".

The President of Mexico, Andrés Manuel López Obrador, said on 30 December 2022 that while the occupation of toll booths was "illegal", a review of the case would go ahead.
