= Amuzgos =

Indigenous people of Mexico

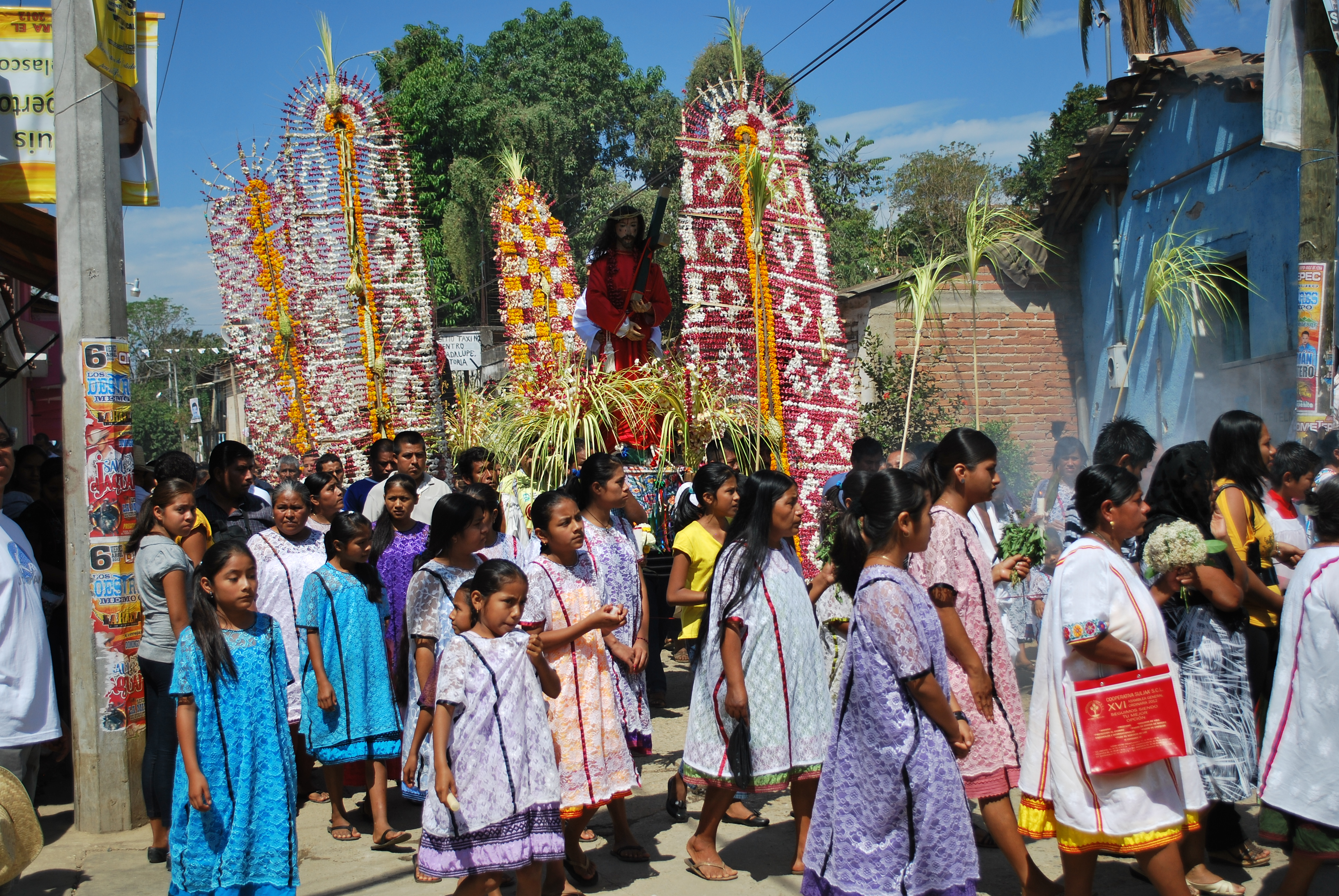
- Good Friday procession in Xochislahuaca with Amuzgos in traditional dress

Total population
- 44,138 (2000)

Regions with significant populations
- Mexico

Languages
- Amuzgo language

The Amuzgos are an Indigenous people of Mexico. They primarily live in a region along the Guerrero/Oaxaca border, chiefly in and around four municipalities: Xochistlahuaca, Tlacoachistlahuaca and Ometepec in Guerrero, and San Pedro Amuzgos in Oaxaca. Their languages are similar to those of the Mixtec, and their territories overlap. They once dominated a larger area, from La Montaña down to the Costa Chica of Guerrero and Oaxaca, but Mixtec expansion, rule and later Spanish colonization has pushed them into the more inaccessible mountain regions and away from the coast. The Amuzgos maintain much of their language and dress and are known for their textiles, handwoven on backstrap looms with very intricate two-dimensional designs. The Amuzgo area is very poor with an economy mostly dependent on subsistence agriculture and Mario guado handcraft production.

== Name ==
The Aztecs referred to them as Amoxco, the origin of the word Amuzgo. One interpretation has it meaning "place of books" probably referring to an administrative center which was then generalized to the people. Another states that it means "people of tin." Yet another states that it means "among mountains" which originally referred to one community and became generalized.

The endonym of the Amuzgo peoples varies by community. In San Pedro Amuzgos it is Tzjon Noan (meaning "people of the textiles or thread"), in Santa María Ipalapa it is Tzo'tyio, and in Suljaa' it is Nn'a^{n}ncue (meaning "the people").

The Mixtecs call them Ñuuñama, which means "people of totomoxtle (dried corn leaves)."

== Territory ==
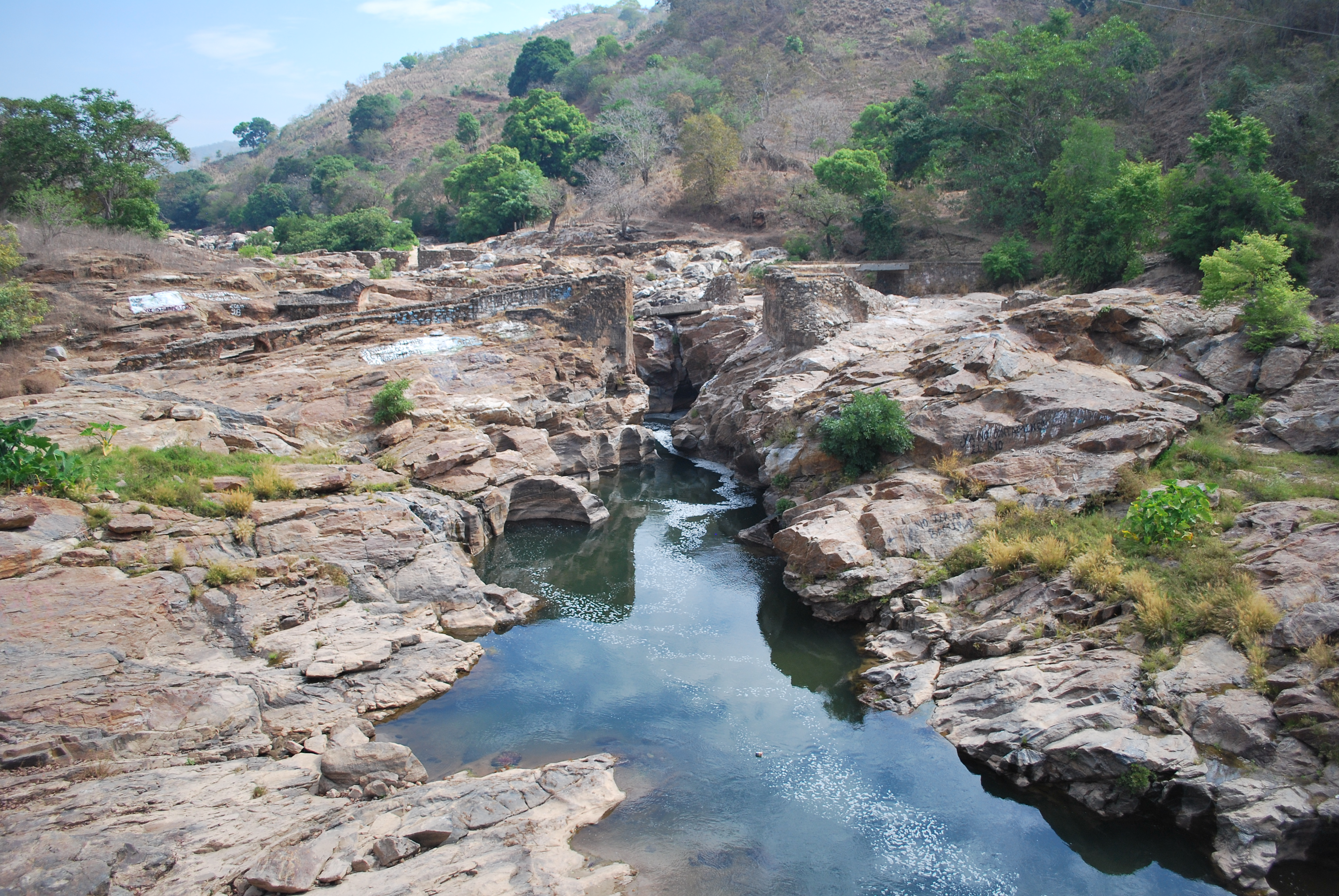
Ravine and mountains near the town of Xochistlahuaca Guerrero

The Amuzgo people are generally found in a 3,000-square-kilometer (1,200 sq mi) region which straddles the border of the Mexican states of Guerrero and Oaxaca, near the coast. The number of ethnic Amuzgos may be as high as 50,000, with about eighty percent living in the state of Guerrero. The Amuzgos are the largest Indigenous group in their region, which they share with Mixtecs and Nahuas as well as mestizos and Afro-Mexicans. The main Amuzgo communities (in order) include Xochistlahuaca, Tlacoachistlahuaca, Cosuyoapan, Zacoalpa, Chochoapan, Huehuetono, El Pájaro, Las Minas, Cerro Bronco, Guadalupe Victoria, Guajentepec, and Pueblo Nuevo in Guerrero with San Pedro Amuzgos and Santa María Ipalapa in Oaxaca. Xochistlahuaca, Tlacoachistlahuaca and Ometepec are from Nahuatl and mean "place of flowers," "place of tlacuache grass" and "between two hills", respectively. The Amuzgos refer to this area as Suljaa´. The municipal seat of Tlacoachistlahuaca is dominated by Amuzgos and mestizos with Mixtecs in the rural areas outside it. The Amuzgos in Oaxaca are one of a number of Indigenous groups found in small communities inside the Mixtec region.

Amuzgo territory is mostly found in the Yacuyagua mountains at elevations of between 500 and 900 meters (1,600 and 3,000 ft) above sea level. The terrain is rugged with many ravines and small valleys. This area is traversed by the Ometepec, Arena, Pulla, San Pedro and Santa Catarina rivers, which empty into the Pacific. Vegetation is dominated by thickets of kermes oaks, with other species such as royal and coconut palms, with mixed forests in the higher elevations and some low grown rainforest closer to the coast. Many trees lose their leaves during the dry season. Wildlife consists of mammals, reptiles and a great variety of birds. Species include badgers, armadillos, raccoons, ocelots, coyotes, anteaters, porcupines, rabbits, parrots, owls and buzzards. The climate of the region is hot and relatively humid with defined dry (November to May) and rainy (May to October). The average annual temperature is 25 °C (77 °F).

The Amuzgos live in their region along with other ethnic groups such as the Mixtecs, Tlapanecs, Nahuas, Triquis, Chatinos, mestizos and Afro-Mexicans. Amuzgo relations with these groups are fluid and complex. With some they are strained, such as the Mixtec because of a history of domination and with the Afro-Mexicans who they associate with Spanish domination, accusing them of being executioners of Indigenous in the past and forcing them to the mountains. Most contact with outsiders is economic in nature with some social and occurs in regional centers such as Ometepec or in communities where there is close proximity. Despite the past domination, the Amuzgo in Guerrero are relatively dominant to the Mixtecs which are present in Tlacoachistlahuaca. However, they are dominated by the far more numerous mestizos.

== History ==
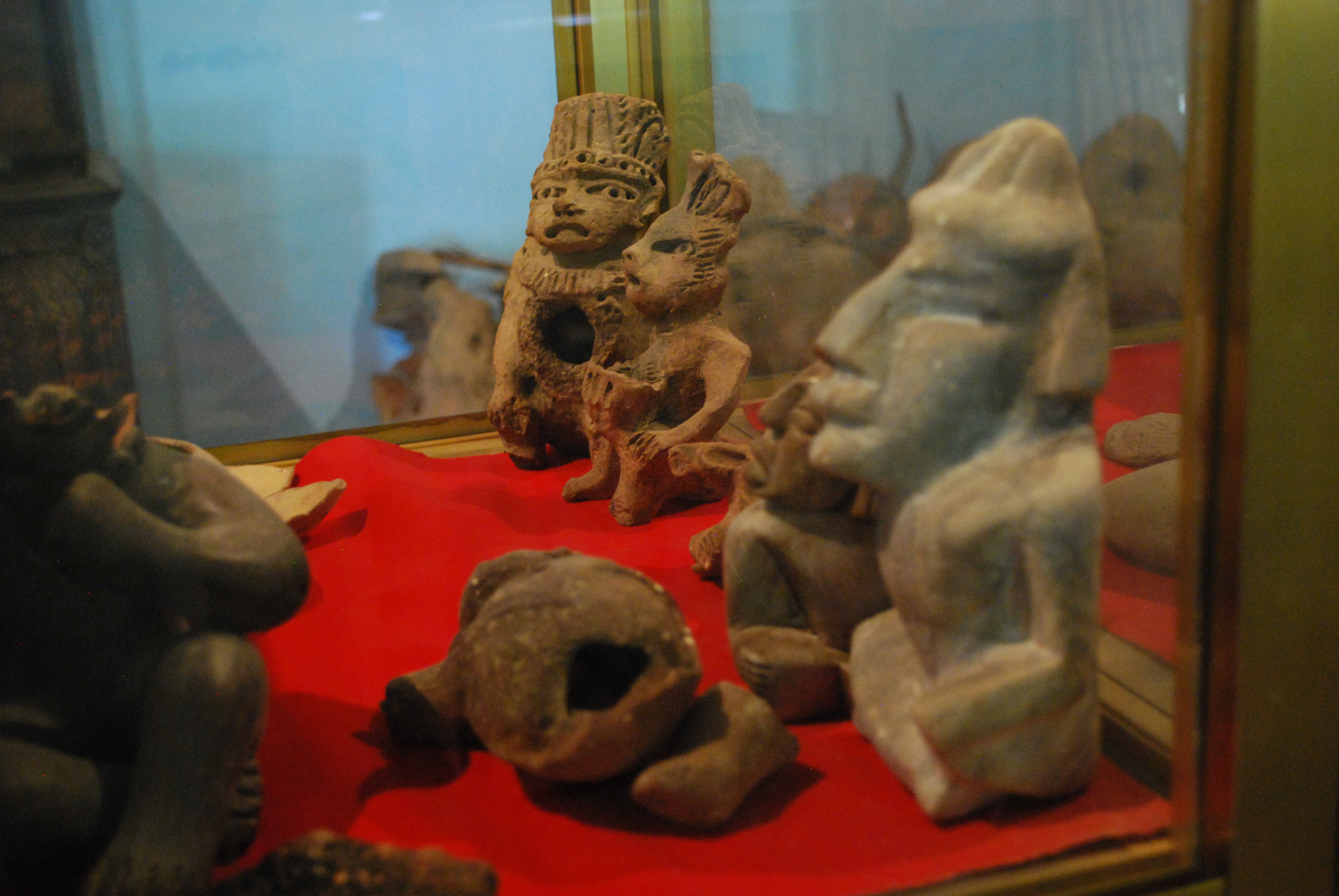
Pre-Hispanic pieces on display at the Amuzgo Community Museum

The origins of the Amuzgos are unknown. One theory has the group arriving to its current location from the Pánuco River area, as well as the Mixtec, with whose language theirs is related. If this is the case, the Amuzgos passed through the Mexican Plateau area and Puebla before heading into Oaxaca and Guerrero. Amuzgo folklore states that they came to Oaxaca/Guerrero coast from islands out in the Pacific. Since their language is similar to others in the Oaxaca area, it is likely that they migrated to their current location on the northern edge of the Mixtec region to escape inter-ethnic violence.

Xochistlahuaca was the capital of an Amuzgo dominion. Around 1100, the Amuzgos were subjugated by the Mixtecs. The Amuzgos paid tribute to the Mixtecs for about 300 years in cotton, cloth, feathers, hides, gold, corn, beans and chili peppers. The area was part of a Mixtec province called Ayacastla, which the Aztecs subjuged in 1457, but they never exercised direct or complete control over the Amuzgos. The Amuzgos rebelled against the Aztecs in 1494 and between 1504 and 1507, which were suppressed.

The Spanish under Pedro de Alvarado subjugated the area in 1522. During the early colonial period, war, disease and overwork decimated most of the Indigenous population with the Amuzgos being one of only four ethnicities to survive. In Xochistlahuaca alone, the Indigenous population fell from about 20,000 in 1522 to only 200 in 1582. Spanish domination pushed them further into the mountains of the Sierra Madre del Sur, a process which had begun under Mixtec domination. Evangelization did reach them and in 1563, Xochistlahuaca was named an administrative and religious center, much as it was in the pre-Hispanic period. The evangelization and colonialization process gave rise to a number of traditional dances such as El Diablo, Los Chareos, Los Tlamaques, Los Apaches, Danza del Tigre, El Toro, La Tortuga, Los Gachupines, Los Moros, La Conquista, Los Doce Pares de Francis and Los Tecuanes.

During the colonial period, the Amuzgo area was governed by the city of Oaxaca (then called Antequera) which in turn was a sub province of Puebla. In the 17th century, it was part of the Chilapa diocese as part of the Puebla bishopric. The Spanish established large haciendas in the areas which remained after Independence until the Mexican Revolution.

The loss of Indigenous labor in Mexico prompted the Spanish to bring over African slaves, most of which arrived to Veracruz. Many escaped slaves and their descendants made their way to Amuzgo territory in the Costa Chica region, which had the effect of pushing the remaining Amuzgo away from the coast. The town of Czoyoapan was supposedly founded by Amuzgos who moved here from an area near San Nicolas, Guerrero, which became dominated by Afro-Mexicans. It is not known when it was founded by it appears in records as early as 1737.

During the colonial period until 1818, Igualapa was the capital of Ayacastla, which was then moved to Ometepec. In 1884, Xochistlahuaca lost its status as a religious center.

In the 19th century, most Amuzgo land wound up in the hands of the family of Guillermo Hacho, to which the Indigenous had to pay rent. In 1920, the Amuzgo began to fight to take back control resulting in the establishment of the Xochistlahuaca ejido in 1933 with 6,384 hectares. This ejido became the municipality of Xochistlahuaca in 1934. In 1967, the ejido was granted an additional 1,419 hectares of land for the growing population.

While Amuzgo communities have been traditionally isolated from the outside world, the construction of highways in the region has connected them. The two main highways in the region are Highway 200, Ometepec-Xochistlahuaca road, Oaxaca-Pinotepa Nacional road and the Huajuapan de León-Pinotepa Nacional road.

From the latter 20th century to the present, there has been migration of Amuzgos out of the territory to find work in other areas of Mexico and in the United States. This has even included permanent migration down into the Cuajinicuilapa area near the coast where Amuzgos were pushed out of in the pre-Hispanic and colonial periods.

== Language ==
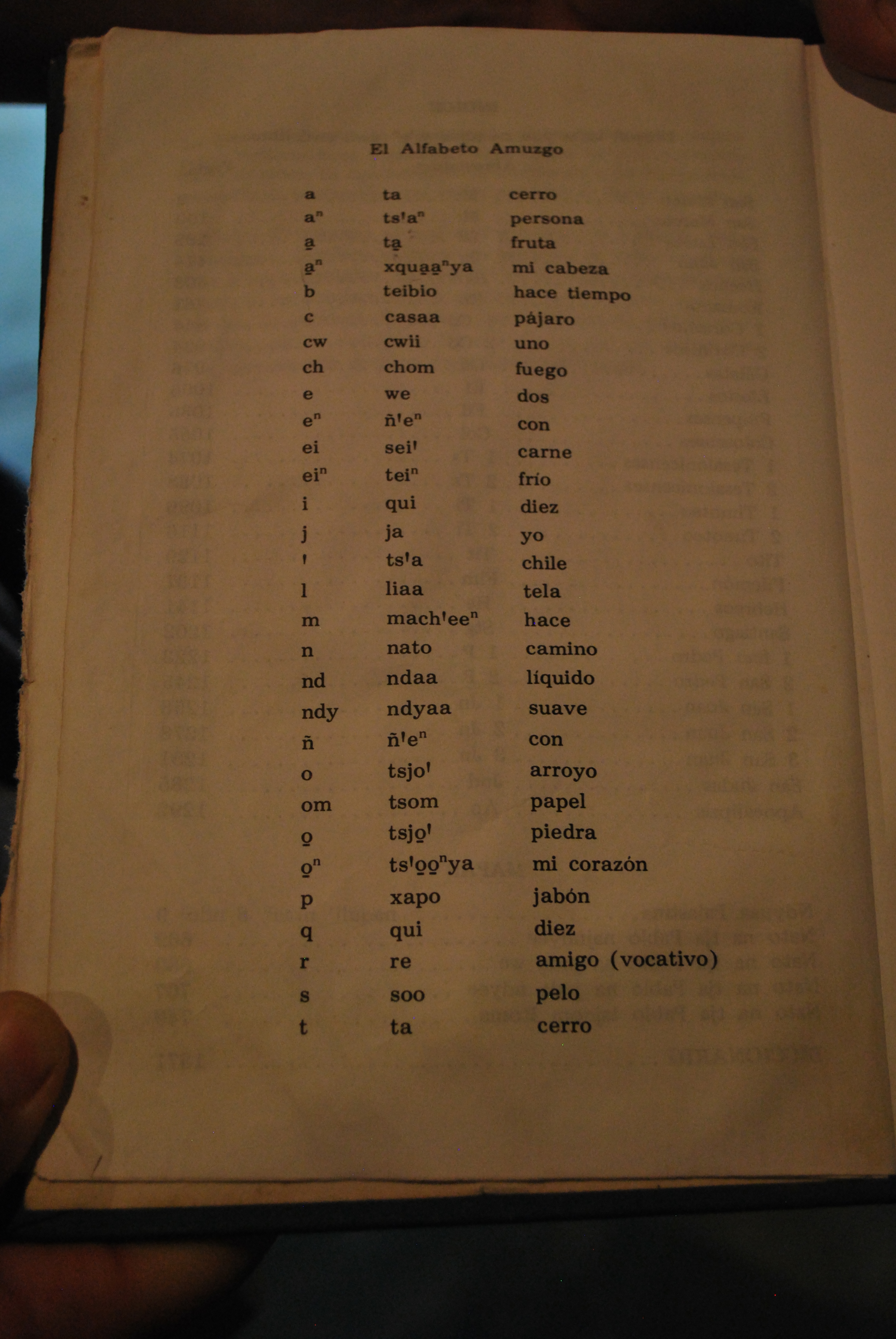
Partial Latin alphabet use to write the Amuzgo language

The Amuzgo language has various names in the language proper based on the dialect and community. This include Tzhonoa, Tzoñ'an, Tsañcue or Nañcue and ñomnda which means "water or sea language" referring to the Amuzgo's mythical origins. The Amuzgo language is part of the Oto-Manguean family, in the Mixtec subfamily. It is related to Triqui, Cuicatec, Chocho-popoloca, Mazatec, Ixcatec and Mixtec.

Four variants of Amuzgo are officially recognized by the governmental agency, Instituto Nacional de Lenguas Indígenas (INALI). They are:

- (i) Northern Amuzgo (amuzgo del norte, commonly known as Guerrero or (from its major town) Xochistlahuaca Amuzgo);
- (ii) Southern Amuzgo (amuzgo del sur, heretofore classified as a subdialect of Northern Amuzgo);
- (iii) Upper Eastern Amuzgo (amuzgo alto del este, commonly known as Oaxaca Amuzgo or San Pedro Amuzgos Amuzgo);
- (iv) Lower Eastern Amuzgo (amuzgo bajo del este, commonly known as Ipalapa Amuzgo).

These varieties are very similar, but there is a significant difference between western varieties (Northern and Southern) and eastern varieties (Upper Eastern and Lower Eastern), as revealed by recorded text testing done in the 1970s. As of 2005, census figures put the total number of Amuzgo speakers at 43,761, with 37,779 in Guerrero, 4,813 in Oaxaca and 1,169 in other places in Mexico. Amuzgo is the thirteenth-most common Indigenous language in Oaxaca. In Guerrero the use of the language is widespread enough to be learned as a second language by Spanish and Nahuatl speakers living in the Amugo area. While many of Mexico's Indigenous languages are disappearing, the Amuzgo have maintained much of their linguistic strength with most children raised to speak it. They are also taught to read and write in the Amuzgo language. In areas where the primary schools do not have primary schools with Amuzgo-speaking teachers, loss of Amuzgo among children and problems with academic development do occur.

== Culture ==
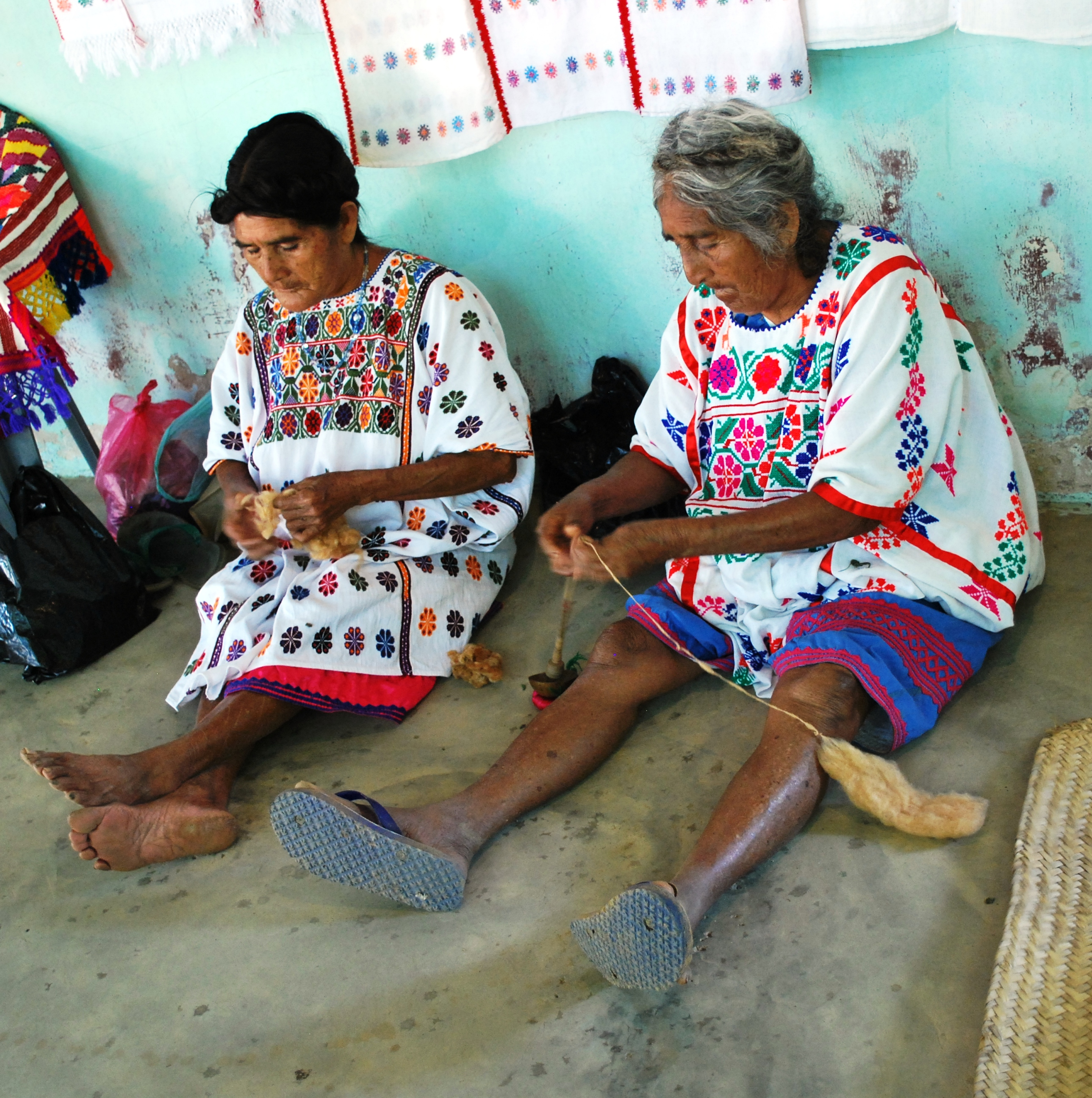
Amuzgo women spinning and sewing

Amuzgo family life is based on both the nuclear and extended family, which is mostly patriarchal. Men generally marry at the age of 17 years with women marrying around age 15. Weddings are elaborate affairs, with food, alcohol and music. In the most traditional communities, marriages are still arranged between families without the children's participation. The family that proposes sets the wedding date and the pair meet at that time, as the families work to cement economic and social ties. The groom is expected to provide various gifts such as corn, beans, chili peppers, firewood, chocolate and money to make the bride's huipil. If the bride is a virgin the consummation of the wedding is celebrated with fireworks. If not, there is some tension. To hold special events such as wedding, baptisms, etc. and for large projects such as planting and building houses, friends and family will group to provide the needed resources.

Gender roles are traditional and have not changed for generations for the most part, although there is some modernizing influence as there is increasing economic and social contact with non-Amuzgos. Boys follow their fathers into the fields when they are small and have most of the agricultural knowledge they need by the time they are twelve. Girls stay at home and learn the domestic work of their mothers, including weaving. Men generally have the economic and social power in communities, including the right to make most of the familial decisions. Men sell the agricultural products and in the past, sold women's textiles, but this has changed. Most children attend school at least to the primary level and a number to the secondary level. Those who wish to continue and have the resources go to Ometepec or Chilpancingo.

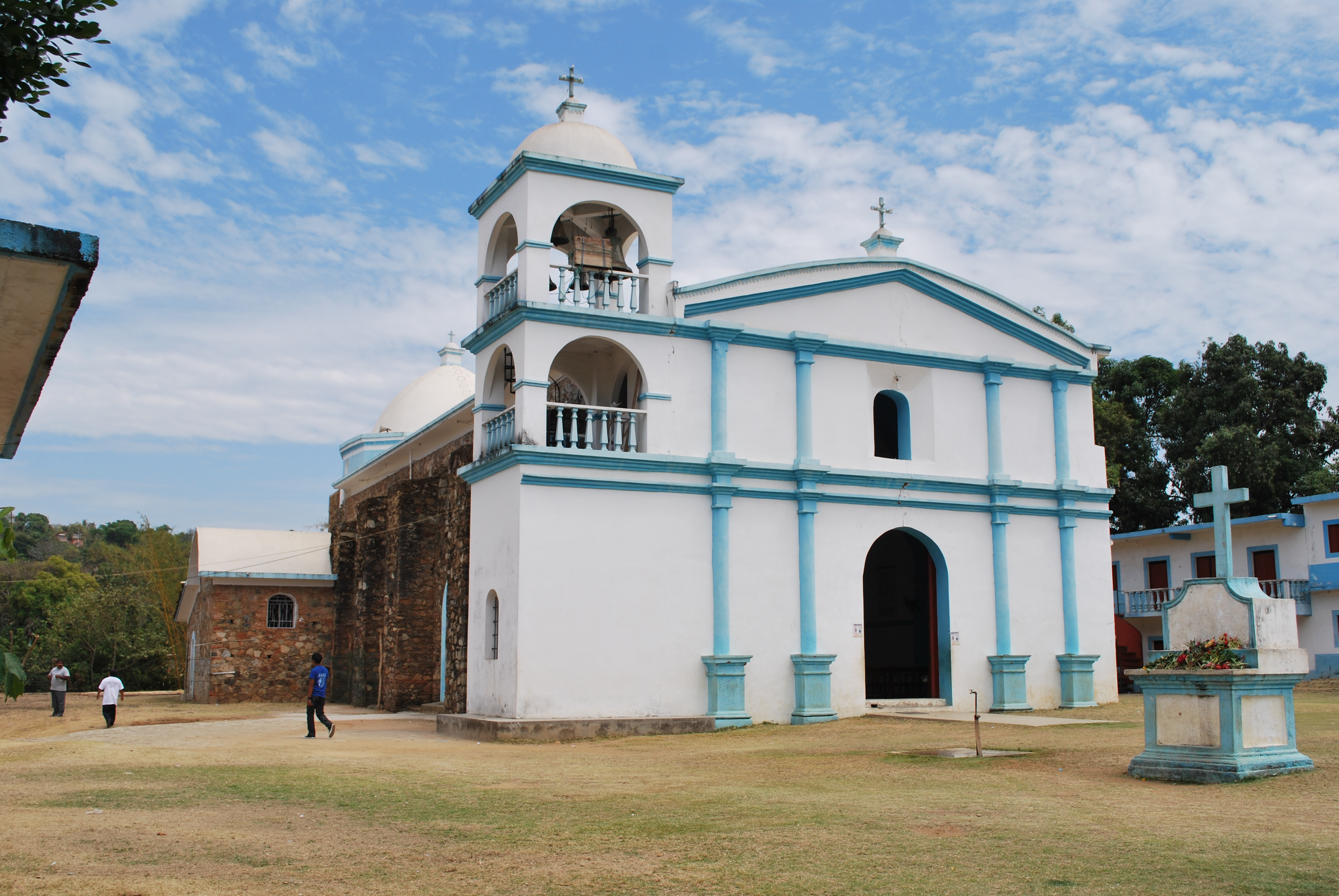
Parish church in Xochistlahuaca

Most Amuzgo are Catholic with a significant percentage being Protestant. The latter phenomenon began in the 1940s with missionaries from an organization called the Instituto Lingüístico de Verano. Catholic churches still dominate centers of municipal seats as well as Catholic festivals and processions, such as those dedicated to patron saints, Carnival, Holy Week and All Saints' Day. Catholic Amuzgos maintain elements of Indigenous beliefs which are found in many festivals and other rites. Water figures prominently in folklore and non-Catholic rites as it is essential for survival in the mountains. For example, the beginning of the rainy season is marked by the feast of Saint Mark on 25 April. The date is also known as the "petition for thunder" for rains that will benefit the crops. On this date, chickens are sacrificed over a set of rocks which are said to mythically represent thunder and lightning. The feast of the Archangel Michael on 29 September marks the end of the rainy season as well as the harvest. There is animistic belief in spirits of the mountains, earth, corn, animals, and other elements of nature. Health is considered to be more of a spiritual issue than physical, with illness mostly blamed on disharmonious actions. While serious cases are sent to medical facilities in large communities such as Putla and Pinotepa Nacional, most Amuzgos prefer to consult traditional healers. Very minor ailments such as stomach pain, colds, flu etc. are treated with herbal medicine. Those illnesses thought to be primarily spiritual in nature are treated by "tzan tí"(wise men) or "tzan kalwa" (shamans or witches) who can both cure and cause harm.

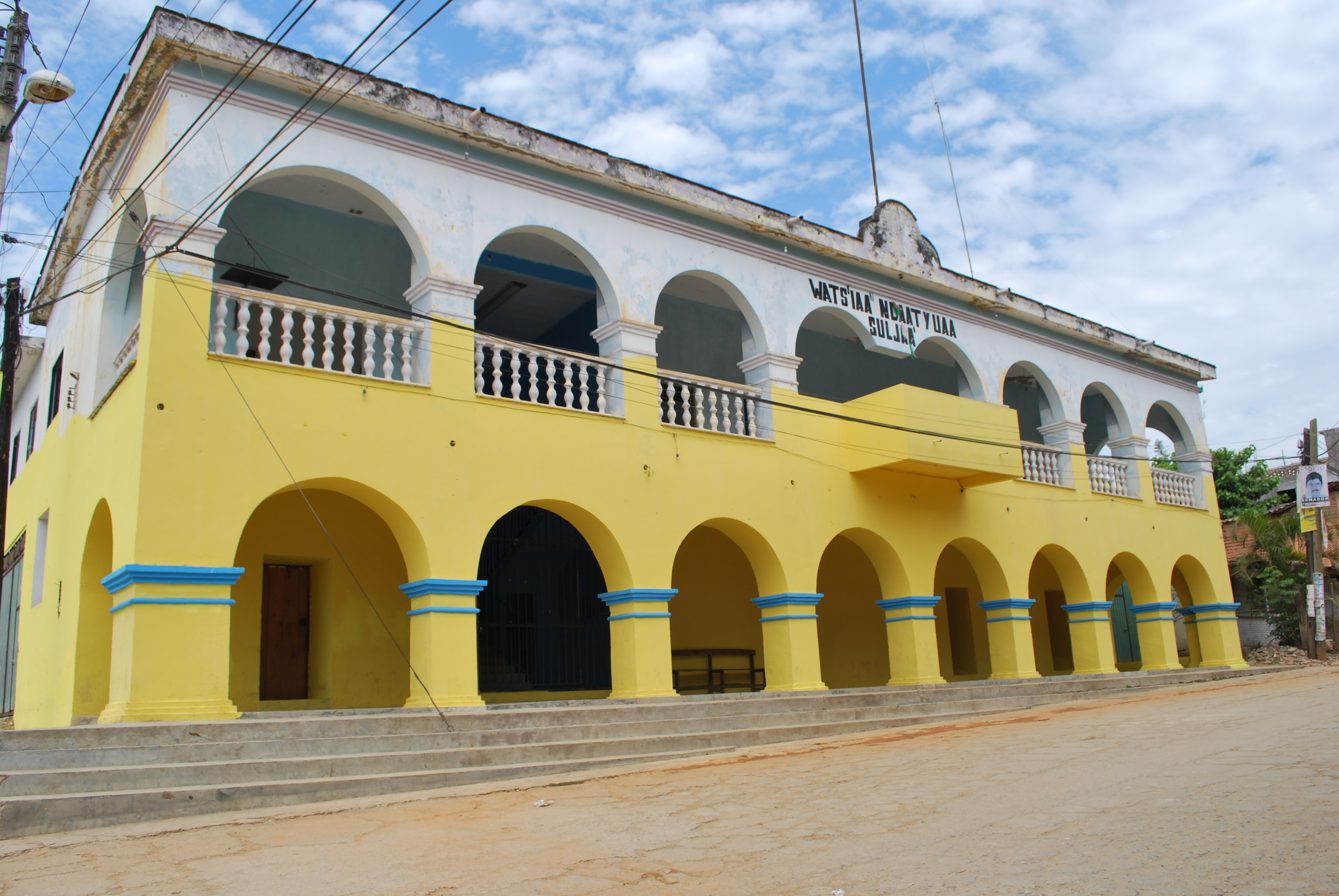
Municipal palace in Xochistlahuaca with name in Amuzgo

While there are municipal and other formal mechanisms of government, a Council of Elders is also recognized in Amuzgo communities. The rise of various political parties in Guerrero and the arrival of different forms of Christianity have caused social upheaval among the Amuzgos. In addition, position in the formal government are often in dispute between the Amuzgos and the mestizos. There are traditional Amuzgo authorities such as "topils," those with police functions and those charged with enforcing community norms. Most of these are related to the performance of various religious functions such as sponsoring a festival. These authorities have the right to demand work for collective benefit called "tequios." The "Comisariado Ejidal" is in charge of land issues. Its board has terms of three years. Some of the issues facing the community include preserving the language in younger generations, preservation of archeological pieces and history, greater participation in federal, state and municipal governments and agencies, presence of alcohol in Indigenous communities, Protestant churches, use of agro-chemicals in the region, power struggles between municipal authorities and Indigenous councils, and land ownership. There has been political conflict between Indigenous and municipal authorities in Xochistlahuaca since 1979, mostly over land, but also over the power of local strongmen called caciques. In 2001, a group of Amuzgos took over the municipal palace to protest irregularities in the government. This coalesced into the formation of the Frente Cívico Indígena de Xochistlahuaca.

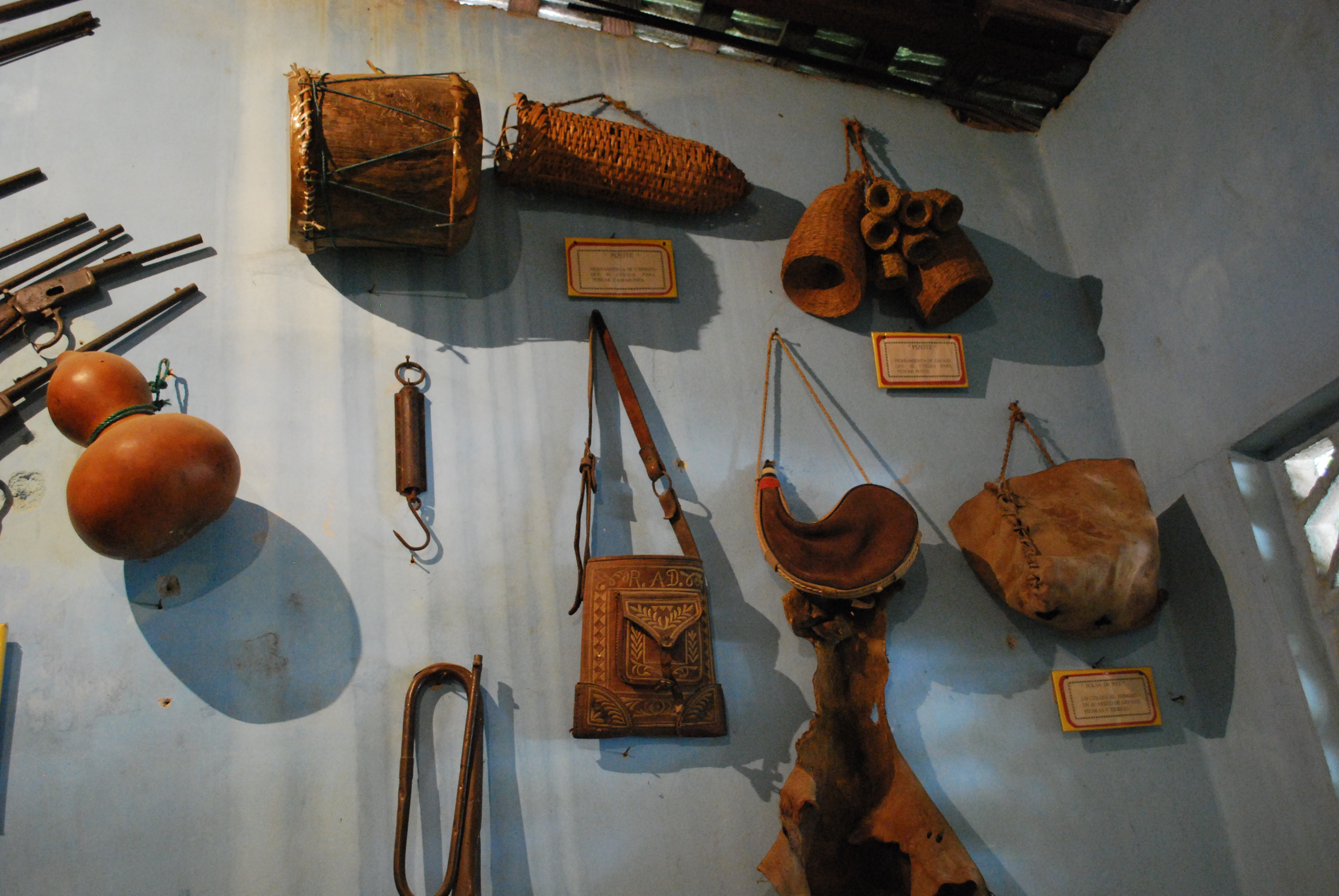
Display at the Amuzgo Community Museum

There have been various efforts to preserve and promote Amuzgo culture and society. The first Encuentro Regional Amuzgo Sobre Derechos y Participación Indígena (Regional Encounter for Indigenous Rights and Participation) was sponsored by the Secretaría de Desarrollo Social (SEDESOL) in Xochistlahuaca to have representative of the various Amuzgo communities meets and discuss political and social issues. The Museo Comunitario Amuzgo was established in 1990 in Xochistlahuaca with two halls. One of these is dedicated to the archeological pieces found in the region. The other is dedicated to the region's handcrafts. The Amuzgo community of Xochistlahuaca has partnered with the Universidad Autónoma Metropolitana to develop programs related to research, cultural diffusion and networking in order to preserve and promote the Amuzgo culture. One important aspect of this work is related to traditional textiles. These textiles are done on backstrap looms and have a repertoire of various designs which have a set of meanings referred to as a "graphic language." The Amuzgo organization is called Liaa' Ljaa', which consists of 59 weavers from the town, headed by Juana Santa Ana Guerrero.

Amuzgo cuisine is heavily based on corn and other locally grown products, such as cacao and piloncillo. Cacao is usually consumed as a hot chocolate beverage for special occasions. Corn is often prepared in the form of tamales, with different flavors such as sweet corn, chicken, with freshwater shrimp and more. One traditional dish is called "cabeza de viejo" or "old man's head" which consists of meat with herbs which are then steamed. Other dishes include barbacoa made with beef or goat. They make a kind of tortilla sweetened with piloncillo called ticasos, as well as candies from a kind of yam and from squash.

== Economy ==
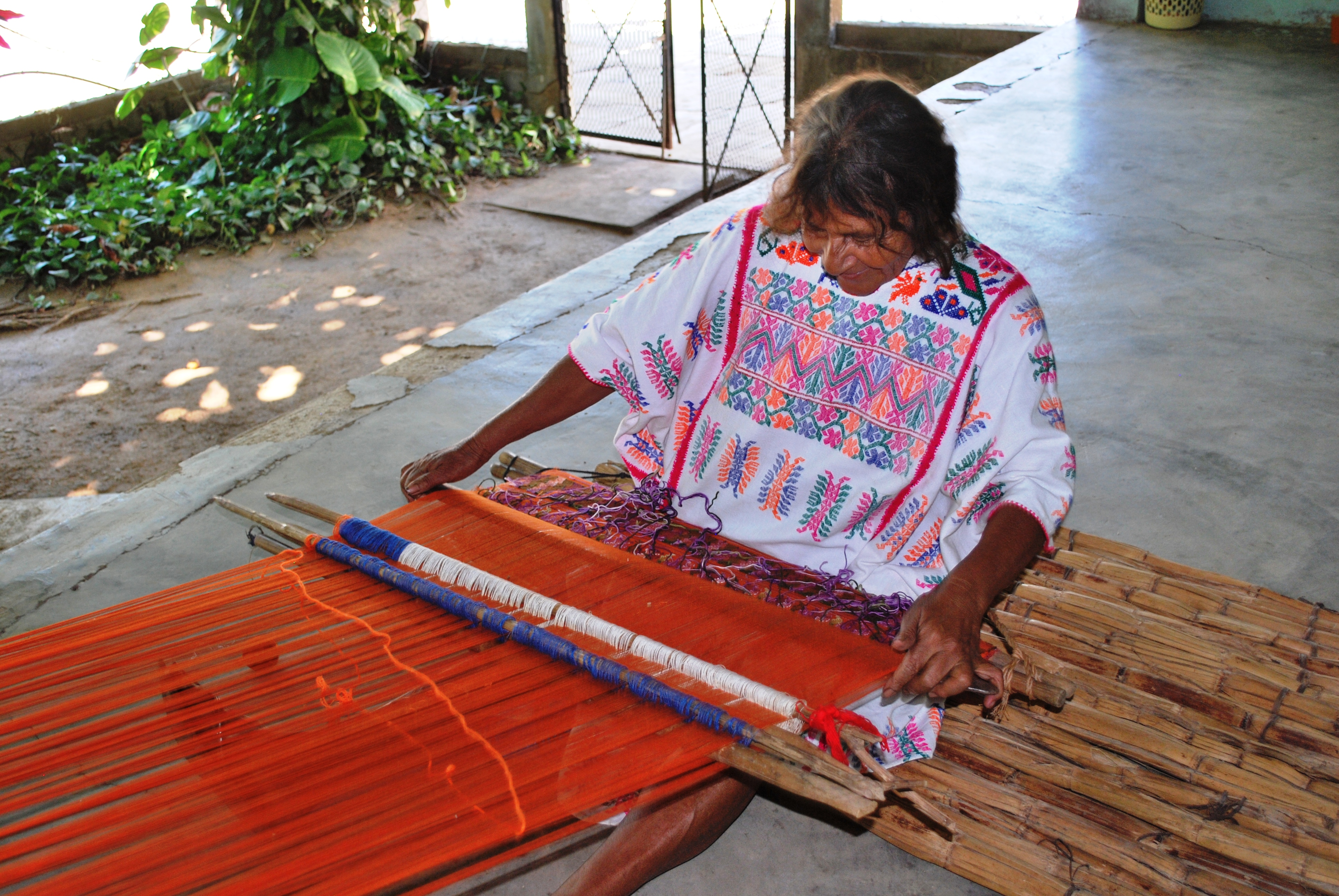
Woman weaving in Xochistlahuaca

Most of the Amuzgo region is very poor with the largest community of Xochistlahuaca the fourth-poorest in the state of Guerrero and the sixteenth-poorest in Mexico. It has serious economic and social problems including access to basic services, with many homes lacking electricity, running water and drainage. Education levels are very low with high levels of illiteracy, but are relatively equal between men and women.

Houses are generally built with participation of friends and neighbors as part of a scheme of mutual help. In towns, houses vary in construction material and style. Homes built in the towns such as San Pedro Amuzgos are increasingly of non-traditional materials such as cement, but most are still of traditional adobe and thatch roofs. The number of rooms varies from one to several. Furniture depends on family income. Most are of one or two rooms and a patio. Most weaving is done in the patio area because of the hot climate. In the farms and ranches, they tend to be more traditional and circular made of grass matted with mud, with a thatch roof. Most of these do not have running water, drainage or electricity. Generally, these families have more than one house, each having a specific function. Sleeping areas or bedrooms with have beds or petates and spaces for keeping clothing. The kitchen areas have a fireplace, table and chairs and places to store dishes and cooking utensils. Other tools can also be stored here. Somewhere in the house there is an altar with Catholic images for family prayer. There is usually a backyard for domestic animals and ornamental plants. Many of these structure do not have electricity and use candles for light.

There are three kinds of land tenure in the region, communal, ejido and private. There are still land disputes between Indigenous and mestizo groups. Historically, the Amuzgos have suffered loss of lands by the Spanish and mestizos, who often side against the Amuzgos. A highway was built to connect Ometepec, Xochistlahuaca and Tlacoachistlahuaca, but a small group controls most transportation on this road due to the costs of buying trucks and busses and it is necessary to have a relationship with this group in order to transport in the area.

The Amuzgo area is experiencing a growing rate of emigration out, mostly of men going to other locations in Mexico to work. There is also emigration to the United States, especially to California, North Carolina and other areas on the east coast. Those women who leave generally go to cities such as Acapulco, Chilpancingo and Mexico City to work as maids.

Most of the Amuzgo economy is based on agriculture for auto consumption, along with livestock and handcrafts such as textiles, ceramics, leather and the making of cheese and piloncillo. Very recently this has also included receiving remittances from those working outside the region. About forty four percent of Amuzgos are dedicated to agriculture and livestock, with forty two percent dedicated to handcrafts and other industry and just over twelve percent dedicated to commerce and services. Sixty-three percent of Amuzgo women do not perform work that produces income, compared to only two percent of men.

Agriculture is often of the slash and burn variety during the rainy season on land that is both communally and individually owned. Important crops include corn, beans, sesame seed, hibiscus, squash, chili peppers, tomatoes, cotton and cacao. One significant source of cash is selling products to the mostly mestizo city of Ometepec. These include other crops such as oranges, mamey, sugar cane, jicama along with manufactured products such as cheese, piloncillo, textiles and fireworks. In some communities, there are some herds of cattle, goats, pigs and domestic fowl, but most livestock is raised by mestizos. In Xochistlahuaca and Tlacoachistlahuaca, agriculture remains the main economic activity, with a growing dairy industry, primarily cheese sold to surrounding municipalities. Men are in charge of most agricultural duties, with women participating in this during certain times such as harvesting.

The Amuzgo have a number of crafts such as pottery (pots, comals, jars, etc.), hammocks, ixtle bags, baskets and more. In Xochistlahuaca, machetes are made with etchings related to the culture of the region. Everyone in the family participates in some kind of handcraft production, divided by gender. Girls are taught to weave and sew cloth and boys learn to weave nets and hammocks. The best-known craft, however, is the weaving of cloth by Amuzgo women, especially in Xochistlahuaca as it is often sold to vendors outside the region.

The center of Amuzgo communities have small commercial establishments such as taco stands, small restaurants, sewing supply shops, grocery stores and stores selling supplies needed for farming and livestock.

== Textiles ==
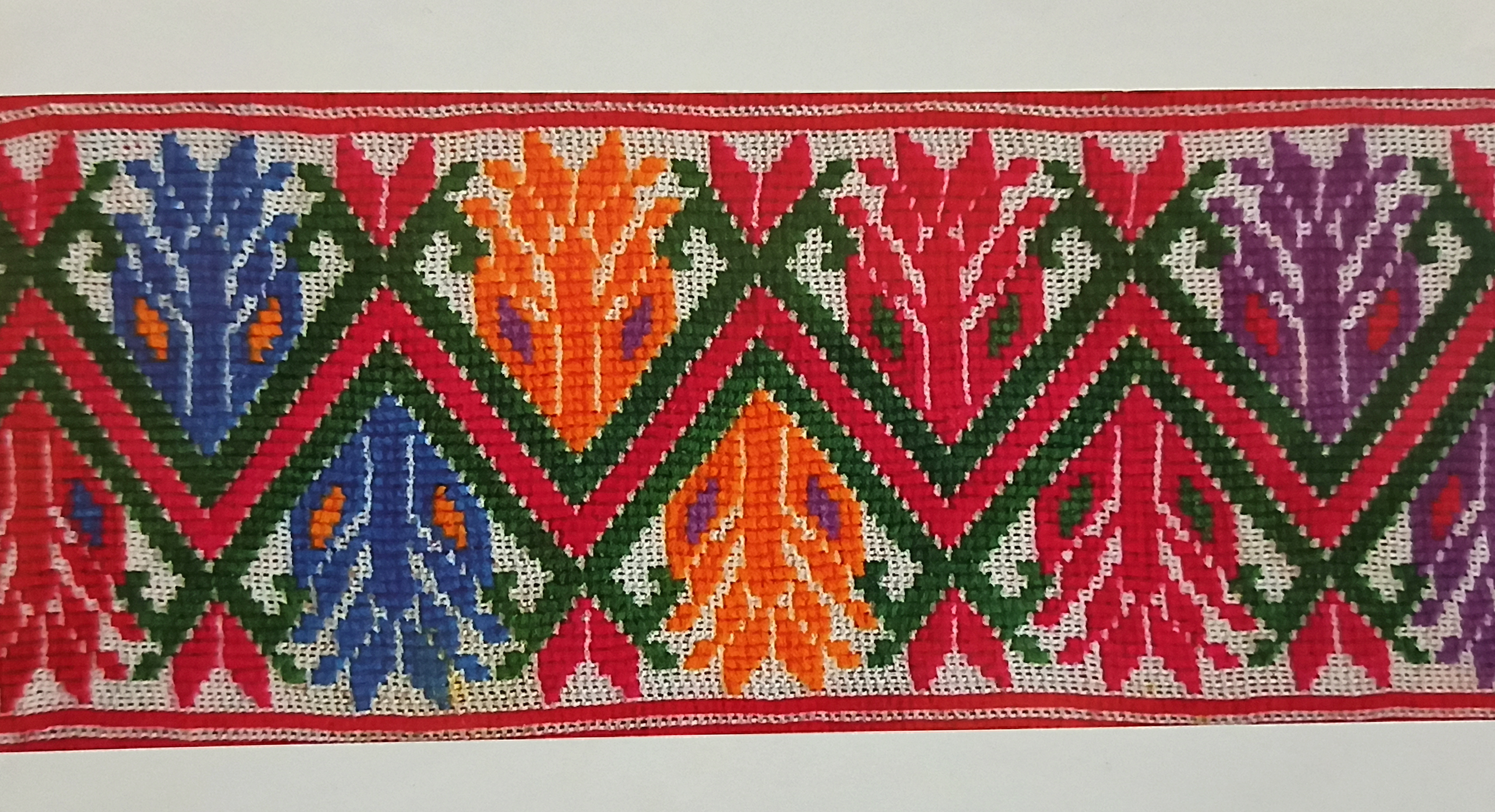
Amuzgo textile design.

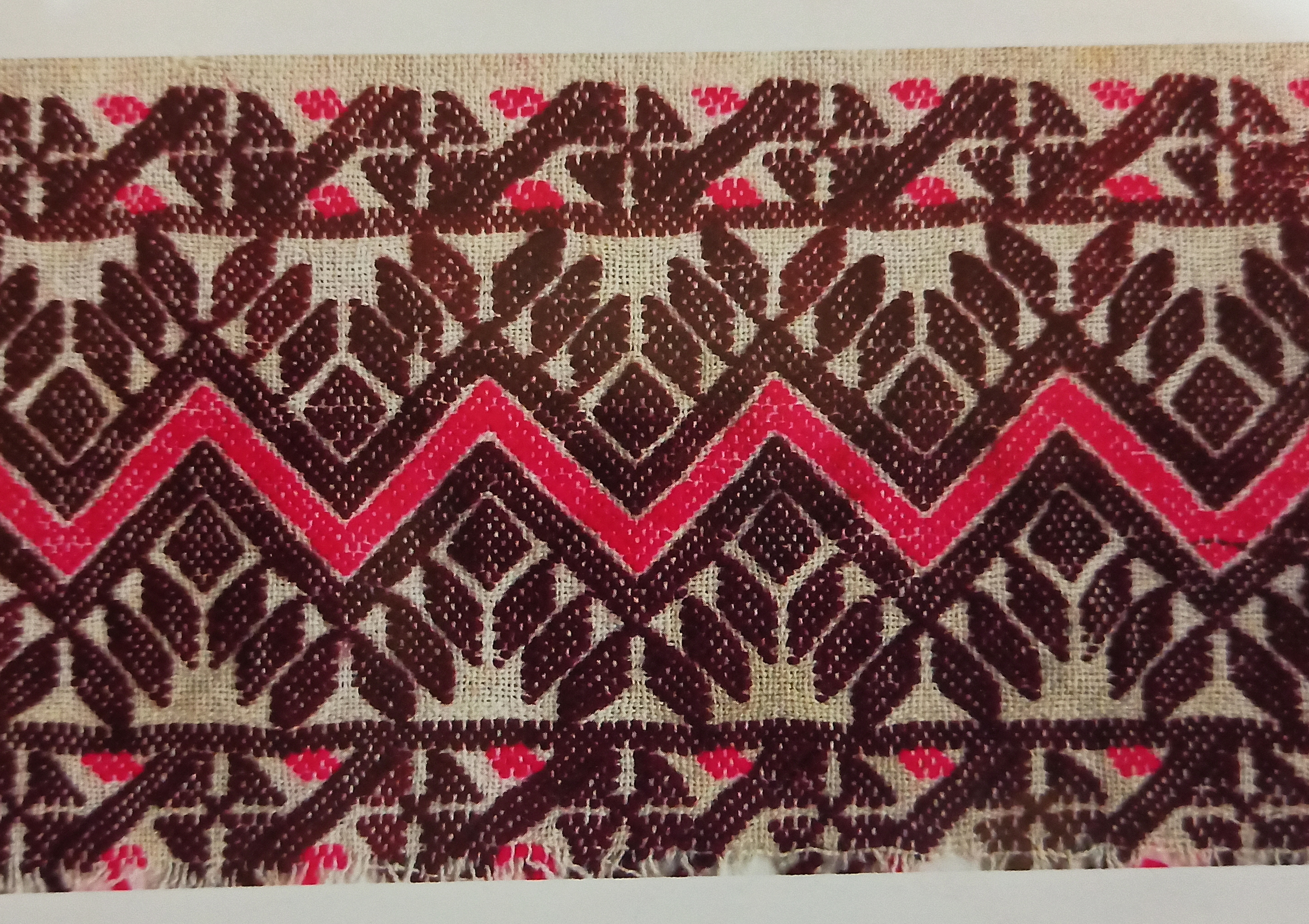
Amuzgo textile design.

Textile production is the most important handcraft for the Amuzgos, which is dominated by women due to traditional gender roles. Children learn their roles through observation and participation in various tasks as they get older. Girls begin learning to weave when they are about six or seven years old starting with tasks such as preparing cotton for spinning. Most learn the basics of weaving on the backstrap loom by the time they are eleven or twelve, then learn to do basic stitching of huipils and embroidery. Those with talent may move on to more elaborate designs apprenticing to a master outside the home. Many of the works of these weavers are meant for sale.

The distinguishing feature of Amuzgo weaving is the two-dimensional designs woven, and sometimes embroidered, into the cloth, especially that destined for huipils, the long tunic garment for women, called "chuey" in Amuzgo. Some of the most traditional designs are those woven by the Amuzgos, especially those in Xochistlahuaca. The designs are a form of "graphic language" to express thought or aid memory. The community of Xochistlahuaca has partnered with the Universidad Autónoma Metropolitana to preserve these designs, especially the oldest and most complicated. The catalog is the first of its kind for this culture. Today, the most complicated designs are generally known only to the oldest weavers. The most traditional cotton for weaving is called "coyuche" or "coyote" because of its brown color. The Amuzgo region is the only place in the world which uses this cotton. This is still grown and used but it has been replaced in many works by white cotton.

Weaving is only one of many chores that Amuzgo women do, which include domestic chores, taking care of children and some farming tasks. However, weaving has taken on an important economic role in many Amuzgo families as the income from farming is no longer enough to subsist.

== Education ==
There are bilingual and monolingual (Spanish) primary schools in the region, along with kindergarten, Indigenous language preschools, middle schools (F2F and distance learning) sponsored by the federal government and one high school run by the Universidad Regional de Sureste. Cultural programs are broadcast in Amuzgo and Spanish from Putla de Guerrero, Tlaxiaco and some from the city of Oaxaca.
