= Xochistlahuaca =

Xochistlahuaca Sulijaá
- Town
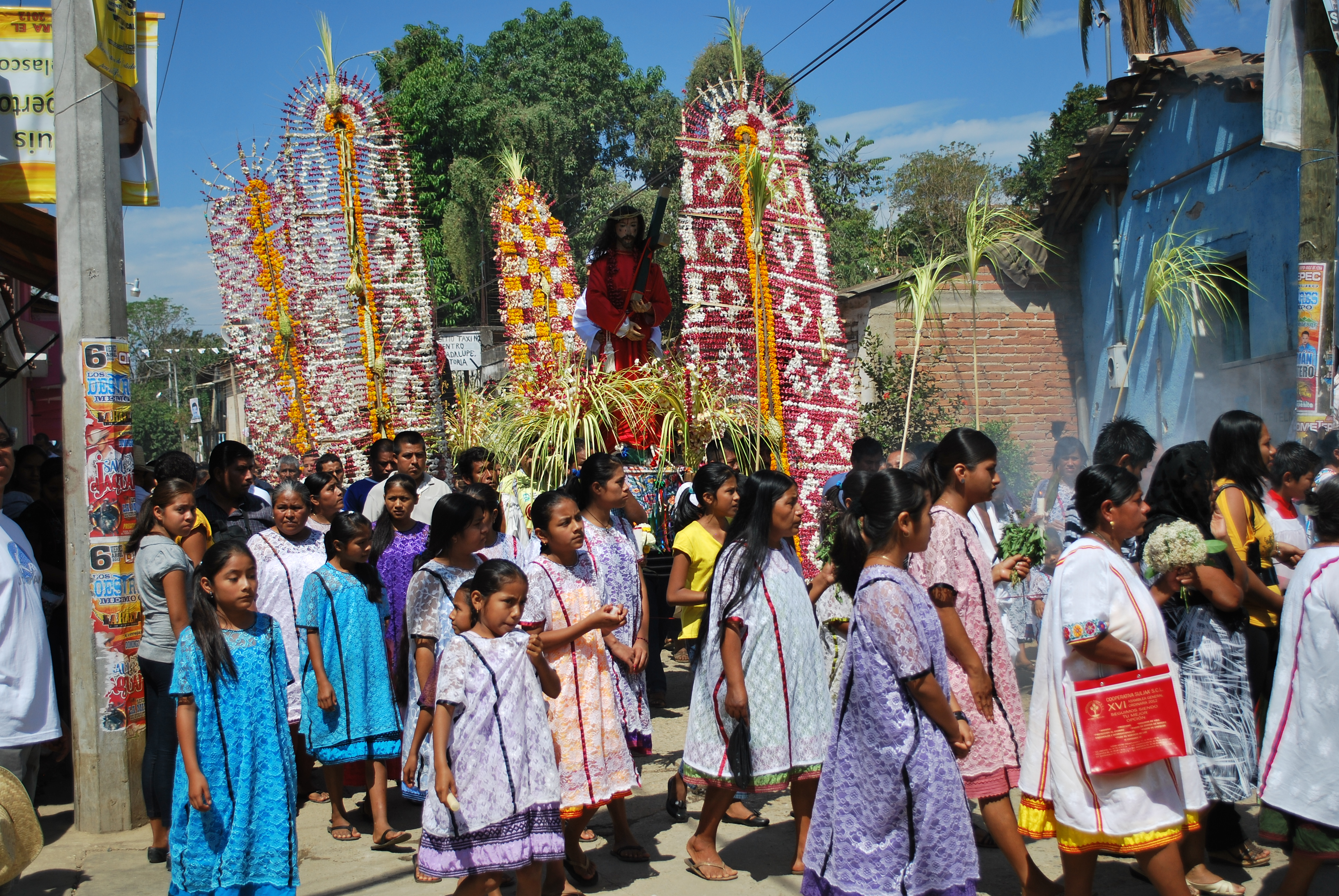
- Good Friday procession in Xochistlahuaca

- Location within Guerrero Location within Mexico
- Coordinates: 16°47′29″N 98°14′31″W
- Country: Mexico
- State: Guerrero
- Municipal Status: 1934

Government
  - Municipal President: Ignacio García Nicolás

Area
  - Municipality: 430 km^{2} (170 sq mi)
- Elevation (of seat): 390 m (1,280 ft)

Population (2005) Municipality
  - Municipality: 28,089
  - Seat: 4,152
- Time zone: UTC-6 (Zona Centro)
- Postal code (of seat): 41770

Xochistlahuaca is a town in Xochistlahuaca Municipality located in the southeast corner of the Mexican state of Guerrero. It is part of the state's Costa Chica region and while near the Pacific Ocean, most of the territory is mountainous. The population is dominated by the indigenous Amuzgo ethnicity, whose women are noted for their traditional hand woven garments, especially the huipil, which is made both for home use and for sale outside the area. The town is home to a communal Amuzgo radio station called Radio Ñomndaa and a community museum dedicated to the Amuzgo people.

== Toponymy ==
The name Xochistlahuaca comes from the Nahuatl xochitl (flower) and ixtlahuatlan (plain); "plain of the flowers".

== The town ==
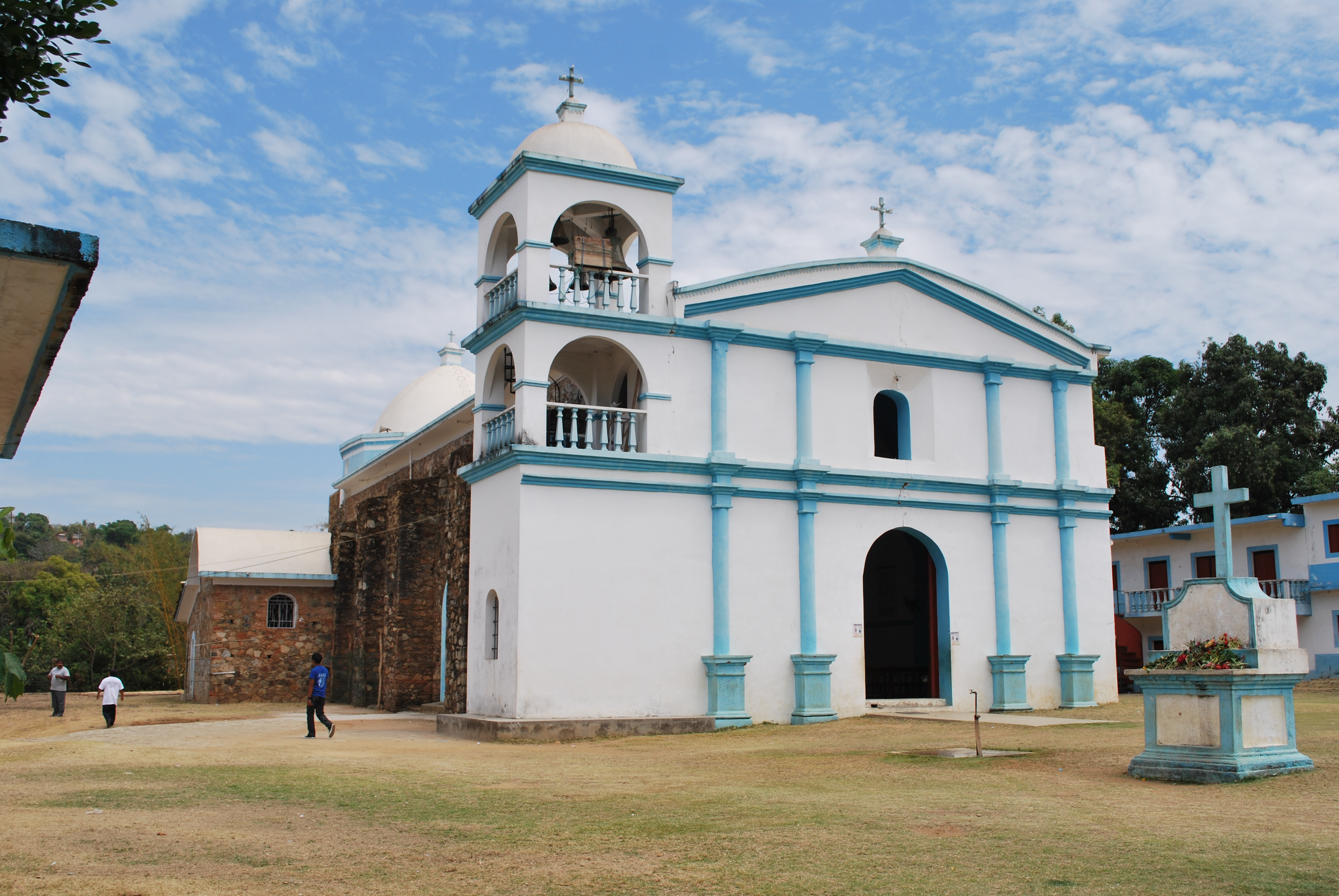
Parish church

The center of population and of the Amuzgos in Guerrero is the town of Xochistlahuaca with a population of 4,152. It is located in rugged territory at an elevation of 390 meters above sea level.

The town is home to a communal Amuzgo radio station called Radio Ñomndaa (Word of water, referring to the Amuzgo language). It has become notable for its advocacy on Amuzgo issues locally and nationally.

The Museo Comunitario Amuzgo has two halls. One contains pre-Hispanic pieces, other historical items such as those from the Mexican Revolution and other antiques. The other is dedicated to the Amuzgo handcrafts, especially textiles, and photographs related to the Amuzgo people.

== Demographics ==
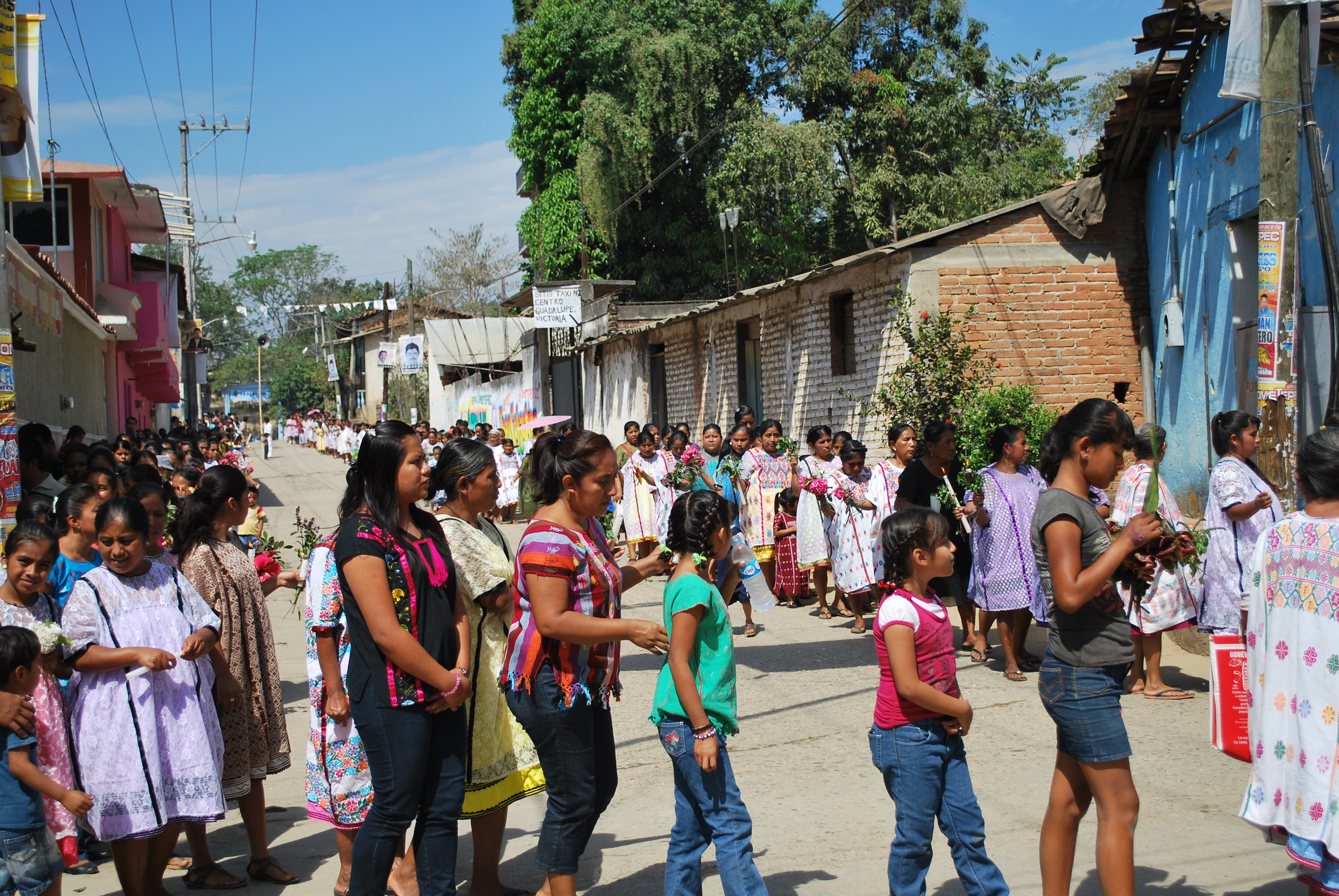
Amuzgo women in town

The population is young with just over fifty percent under the age of twenty. In 2005, 91.7% of the population was indigenous with almost 86% of these being Amuzgo. The rest are almost all Mixtec. Xochistlahuaca is the largest of the Amuzgo communities which are located in this mountain area on both sides of the Guerrero/Oaxaca border although eighty percent are in Guerrero. Most of the Amuzgos in the municipality still speak the language, which is of the Oto-Manguean family. Some are monolingual, not speaking Spanish. The origin of the Amuzgo people is not known but as their language is related to Mixtec, it is possible they migrated along with these people from the north and separated out to this region to escape inter-ethnic violence. The Amuzgo name for Xochistlahuaca is Suljaá. There are some mestizos, which live primarily in the seat.

== Culture ==
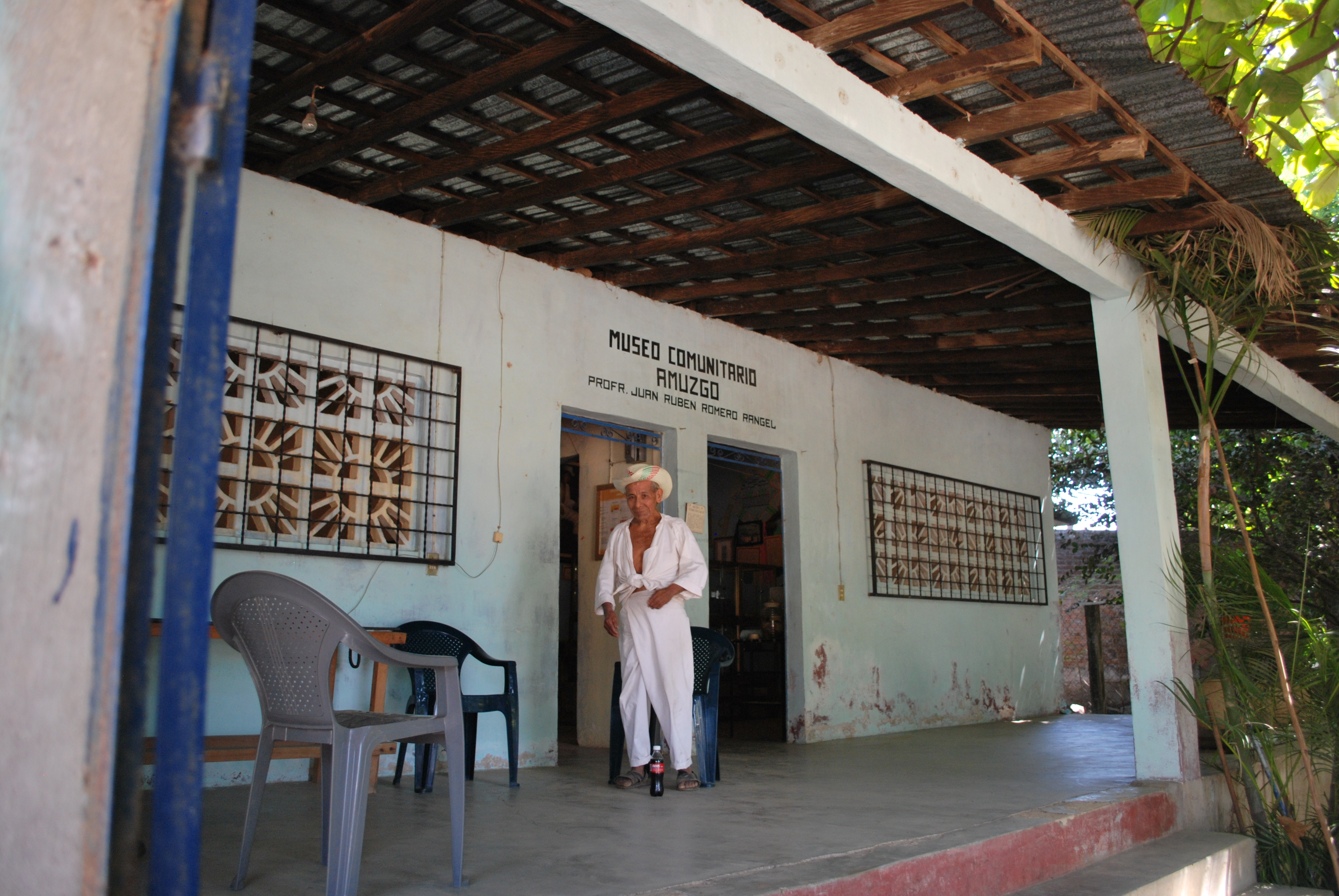
Amuzgo man in traditional dress in front of the Amuzgo Community Museum

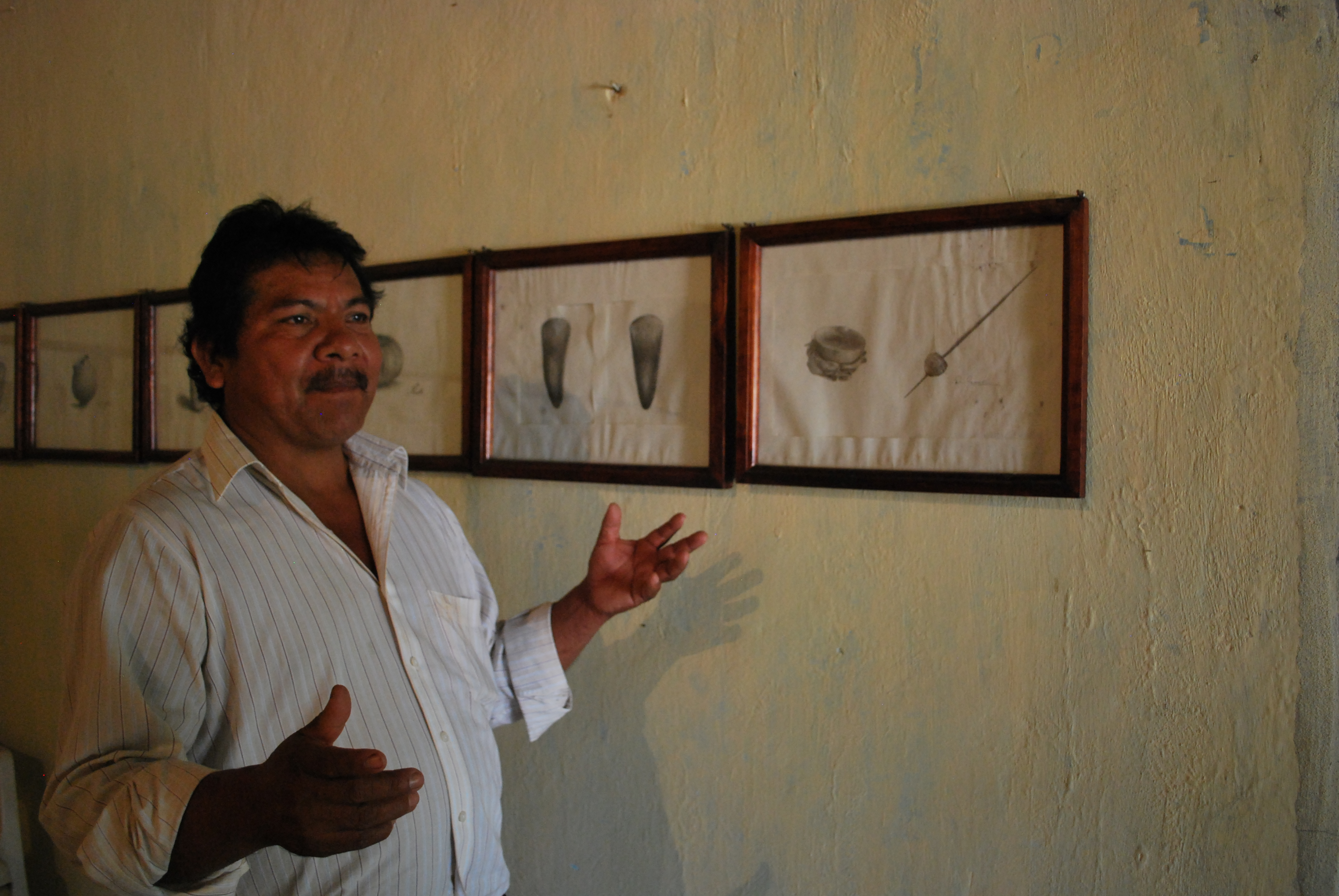
Ireneo Santa Ana Guerrero explaining images of textile weaving at the Amuzgo Community Museum

Most of the municipality's cultural heritage is based on that of the Amuzgos, as the largest community of this ethnicity. Children from the municipality have been gathering indigenous oral stories for recording as part of the Concurso National de Narraciones Orales en Lenguas Indígenas (National Contest for Oral Narrations in Indigenous Languages). Juana Iriabth Moctezuma Tapia won the contest in 2004.

Most of the population is classified as Catholic although there is a small but growing percentage of Protestants. Protestantism was introduced to the region by the Instituto Lingüistico de Verano in the 1940s. Catholic beliefs are generally a syncretism with Amuzgo ones. On the feast day of Saint Mark, which comes at the beginning of the rainy season, chickens are sacrificed over a set of blue rocks which represent thunder and lightning. This is in petition for abundant rain and crops for the coming growing season. The end of the growing season and harvest are marked by the feast day of the Archangel Michael on September 29. Traditional medicine men and healing are preferred by many as illness is generally conceived of as spiritual. Other important festivals include Carnival and the feast day of the Virgin of Guadalupe on December 12. In the community of Cozoyoapan, the feast day of Saint Sebastian on January 20 is important.

Most women and even men wear traditional clothing, made with either commercial or hand woven fabric. Industrial weaving has made hand weaving obsolete except for specialty garments or for those made for sale. the Amugo women of Xochistlahuaca are known for their hand woven fabric using the most traditional techniques and designs. Most of this fabric is sewn into huipils, a traditional women's garment and other traditional items such as tablecloths, napkins and rebozos. All pieces are original with no two exactly alike. Amuzgo women begin learning the weaving process when they are children with simple tasks such as cleaning and carding cotton. As they grow, they learn more difficult techniques and designs from the mothers and grandmothers using a traditional backstrap loom. Historically, weaving was to make clothing from the family, but it has become an important source of income for many Amuzgo families. A number of Xochistlahuaca weavers have won awards for their work such as the Premio Nacional de Ciencias y Artes in 2004 and the weavers receive support from federal and other sources. Cooperation with government and university institutions has allowed the weavers to create new items and designs including pants, bathrobes, skirts and more. However, the huipil remains the most common and most sought-after item even though they tend to sell better to foreign buyers than Mexican ones as foreigners tend to appreciate the effort that goes into traditional weaving.

The traditional diet of the municipality is based on corn and other locally grown products. Chocolate is generally consumed as a beverage, especially during special events such as weddings. Tamales are a fundamental part of the diet and come in a variety of forms and fillings such as sweet corn, pork, chicken, freshwater shrimp and more. One local dish is called the cabeza de viejo or old man's head and there is a type of sweetened tortilla called a ticaso.

== History ==
There is evidence that Xochistlahuaca was the capital of an Amuzgo dominion, which was subject in part to the Mixtec province of Ayacastla when the Aztecs arrived in the 15th century. While Ayacastla was subjugated, the Amuzgos were never completely or directly under the control of the Aztecs. However, because of Aztec domination of the area, the name Xochistlahuaca comes from Nahuatl and means "plain of flowers." This is also the case for "Amuzgo" which means "where there are books," probably referring to the Xochistlahuaca's role as an administrative center. Much of the Amuzgo concentration in this region is due to the displacement of these people from the coast, first by Mixtec expansion, then by Spanish domination. Lastly, escaped slaves and their descendants came to dominate former Amuzgo lands, especially in what is now Cuajinicuilapa. The community of Cozoyoapan was founded by displaced Amuzgos in the colonial period from what is now San Nicolás in Cuajinicuilapa.

The area was conquered by Pedro de Alvarado in 1522. After the Spanish conquest, many indigenous in Guerrero died of disease and war, leaving the Amuzgos as one of only four ethnic groups to survive. In 1522, Xochistlahuaca had a population of about 20,000 but in 1582, this was down to 200 Amuzgos before recovering later in the colonial period. The Amuzgos were integrated into colonial rule via evangelization. In 1563, the town was named an administrative and religious center, similar to its role in the pre Hispanic era. During the 16th century, it was subject to Oaxaca city (then called Antequera) then it became part of the Puebla province. In the 17th century, it became part of the Chilapa diocese under Puebla and in 1884, it lost its status as a religious center.

During the Mexican War of Independence, Vicente Guerrero and his troops passed through the area in 1812, stopping at the Cerro Verde to reorganize and supply. In 1821, it became part of the Capitanía General del Sur, but then went back to Puebla in 1823 as part of the municipality of Ometepec. When the state of Guerrero was created in 1849, the town was made the seat of a municipality, which was then ratified in 1872. However, the seat was moved to Abasolo in 1873. In 1932, the town became a seat of a municipality again, this time separating from Ometepec. This was recertified in 1934.

From the colonial period through the 19th century, the Amuzgos lost control of their lands, paying rent to Spanish lords such as Guillermo Hacho. In 1920, the Amuzgos began to fight to regain control with the Xochistlahuaca ejido established in 1933 on 6,384 hectares. This ejido was recognized as the Xochistlahuaca municipality in 1934. In 1967, the ejido/municipality received 1,419 hectares more territory for a total of 7,803 hectares today.

In 1997, Hurricane Pauline, one of the worst cyclones to hit Mexico's Pacific coast, caused heavy rain leaving the municipally stranded by the loss of roads.

Since the latter 20th century, the political situation in Xochistlahuaca has been unstable. It is complicated by the fact that there are two authorities, traditional indigenous councils, mostly Amuzgo and the constitutional municipal government, dominated by mestizos. The Amuzgo council usually consists of elders selected for their participation in the community, especially the sponsorship of religious festivals as well as family ties. The municipal authorities are dominated by mestizos because of their command of Spanish and greater ties to the overall Mexican culture. This has caused tension between the two groups which has been complicated by converts to Protestantism who reject the traditional councils and independent political movements, especially since the 1980s. In the early 2000s, the political situation was particularly volatile with the municipal president Aceadeth Rocha refusing to recognize certain traditional authorities. In 2001, a group of Amuzgos took over the municipal palace to protest. This action spurred the creation of the Frente Cívico Indígena de Xochistlahuaca and the Frente Comunitario de Xochistlahuaca, which have had influence in both political and social issues. Sentiments among the Amuzgos have run particularly against the PRI political party, which dominated municipal politics for decades and mostly in favor now towards National Action Party (PAN). Since 2006, both traditional and municipal authorities have recognition but the situation remains uneasy.

On March 20, 2012, a 7.4 earthquake was centered very near the municipality affecting it and most of the rest of the Costa Chica region. It was the strongest in Mexico since the 1985 earthquake. Over fifteen communities in the municipality suffered moderate damage including large cracks and separated walls in a number of community churches and landslides covering roads.

== Geography ==
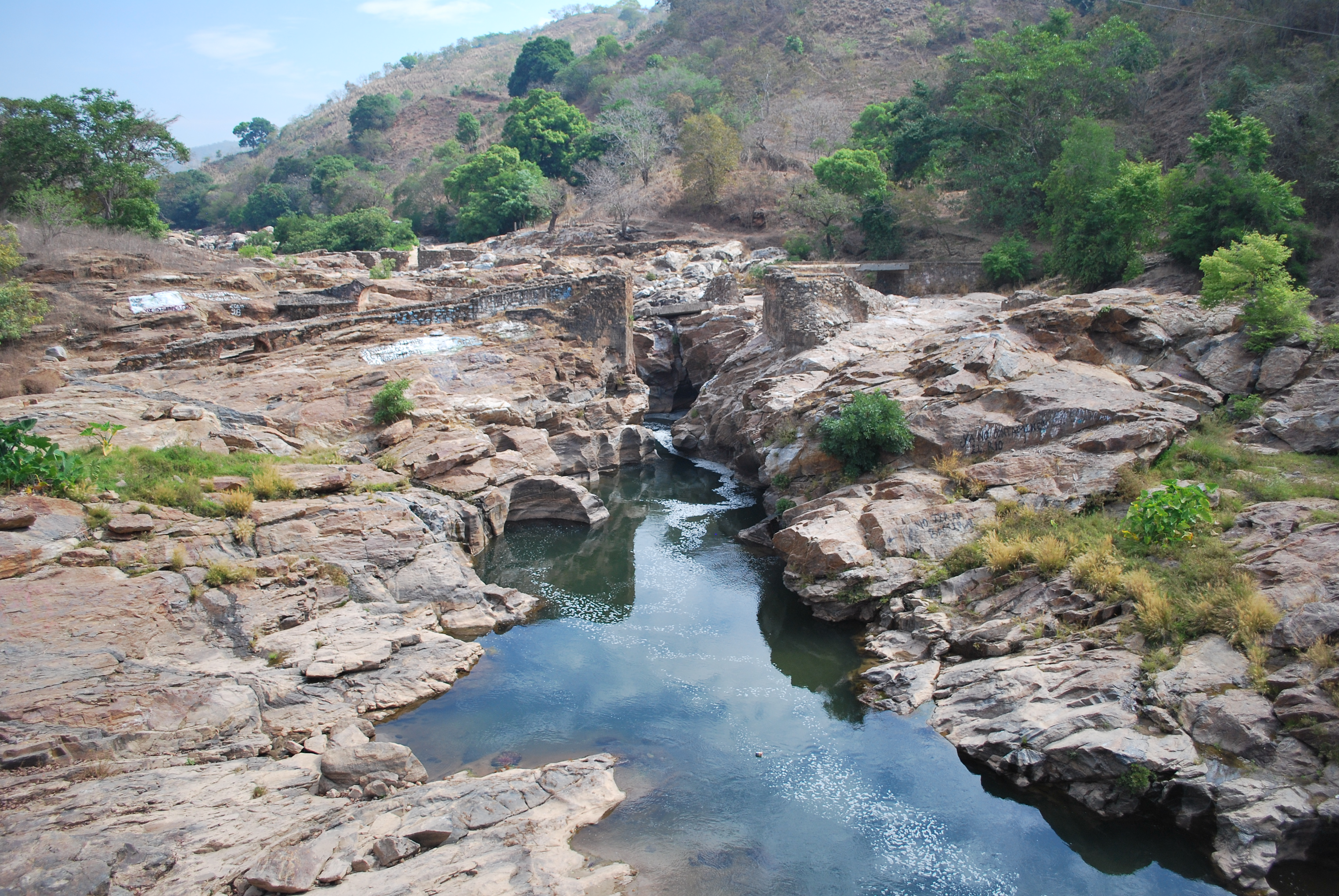
Ravine outside the town of Xochistlahuaca

The town and municipality is located southeast of the Guerrero capital of Chilpancingo. It is part of the Costa Chica region of the state which extends from Acapulco to the Oaxaca border. The municipality straddles the Sierra Madre del Sur and the flatter areas that reach down towards the Pacific Ocean. About 65% of the terrain of the municipality is mountainous and rugged, mostly in the north with small mountain ranges known as Pajaritos and Malinaltepec, which reach about 2,000 meters above sea level. The two most important elevations are the Cerro Verde and the Cerro de Agua. About 25% is flat and semi-flat with the rest being small valleys and riverbanks.

The main river is the Santa Catarina which separates the municipality from the state of Oaxaca. Other important rivers include the Puente and the San Pedro or Xochistlahuaca River. These rivers with year-round flow provide potable water for most of the area's population in towns such as Tres Arroyos, La Montaña, El Pájaro, El Chacale, La Guacamaya, El Lagarto and Arroyo Caballo. Other rivers include Atotonilco Verde, Mujer, Totole, Fierro, Pájaro and Lagarto. There are also many streams which flow year round as well.

Most of the territory is used for either agriculture or livestock. There are some areas with forest. There are two main types of wild vegetation in the municipality. The first runs along the north side of the Sierra Made del Sur where there are mixed forests with various species of trees including oak and mahogany. On the south side, there is low-growth rainforest (under fifteen meters of height) with much of the area's fruit growing takes place. Many of the trees lose their at least some of their leaves during the dry season. Much of the area's habitat has been degraded but there is still some wildlife such as raccoons, badgers, foxes, wild boar, deer, wildcats, and a number of reptile and bird species.

=== Climate ===
The climate is semi moist with temperature ranges between hot, semi hot and temperate depending on altitude. The border with Tlacoachistlahuaca is the coolest. The average annual temperature is 25C. Average annual rainfall is between 1000 and 2000 mm per year with a defined rainy (May to October) and dry (November to April) season which are agriculturally and culturally important.

== Socioeconomics ==
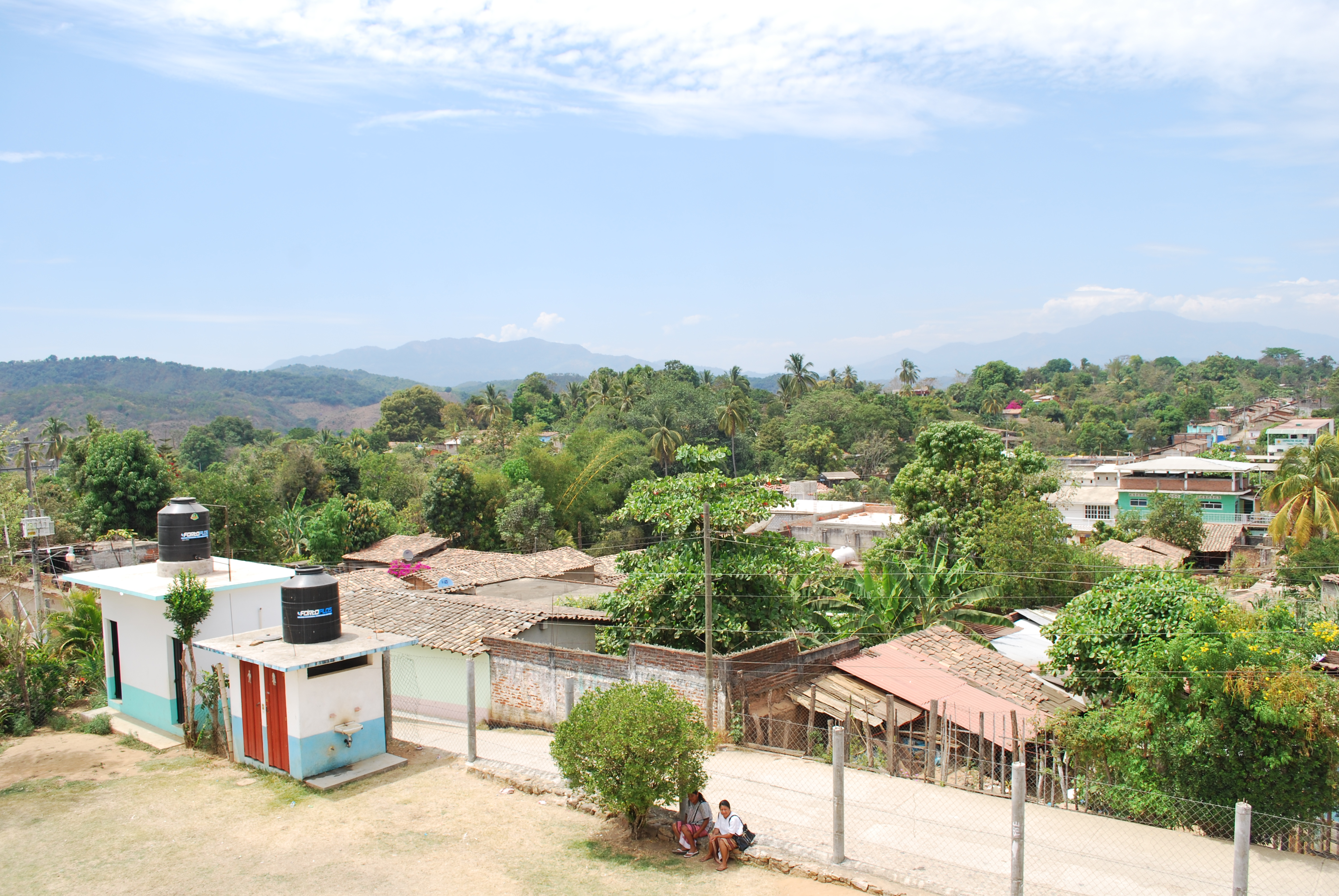
View of houses from the bell tower of the parish church

The municipality, including its seat, has a very high level of socioeconomic marginalization. It is the fourth poorest in the state of Guerrero and the sixteenth poorest in Mexico. In 2010, there were 6,019 residences in the municipality. Most of these are constructed with adobe and thatch instead of more modern cinderblock and brick, especially outside the municipal seat. Most are one or two rooms, and some are simple structures meant to be occupied during the growing season. Most homes in the municipality lack one or more services such as running water, electricity and drainage. Almost 30% with dirt floors.

Almost 33% earn less than minimum daily wage. Migration out of the municipality is low but it is growing. Most are men who go to Acapulco, Chilpancingo, other states in Mexico and some to the United States. This migration is both seasonal and permanent. Women who migrate usually stay in Mexico and work as domestics.

There is an illiteracy rate of almost 30%. About 54% do not complete basic education.

One improvement is that access to health services rose from less than fifteen percent in 2005 to over 73% in 2010.

The economy is based on subsistence agriculture, livestock, handcrafts especially textiles and ceramics and some commerce. Newer products include the making of cheese and piloncillo. Most of the products which are sold outside of the municipality go to the mestizo markets in Ometepec. These include cash crops such as oranges, mamey, sugar cane, jicama and piloncillo, along with handcrafted items such as textiles and fireworks. Economic activity is generally assigned by gender with men doing the farming and livestock raising and women doing domestic chores and weaving.

The main economic activity in Xochistlahuaca is agriculture. Agriculture is mostly of the slash-and-burn variety with most land held communally. The most important crops are corn, beans, sesame seed and hibiscus followed by squash, chili peppers, tomatoes, cotton and cacao . Important cash crops include mangos, sapotes, tamarind, hibiscus, amaranth, spearmint, tomatoes and potatoes. Most is grown on the south side of the municipality.

There has been a growing industry of cattle raising and dairy products, such as cheese for sale to surrounding municipalities, especially Ometepec. The forest as a number of tropical hardwood species which are used to make furniture with an annual harvest of about 2500 m^{2} per year.

About 45% of the population is dedicated to industry, mostly women who weave. Weaving and other handcrafts play an important economic role as in many cases, farming is not enough to meet subsistence needs.

Most of the commerce is in the municipal seat and includes shops selling sewing supplies, groceries, farming supplies and food stands. There is some tourism by people who come to see the textiles.

== Notable residents ==
- Kenia Hernández: human rights activist.
