= San Pedro Amuzgos =

- Municipality and town
- Location in Mexico
- Coordinates: 16°39′N 98°06′W
- Country: Mexico
- State: Oaxaca

Population (2020)
  - Total: 4,922
- Time zone: UTC-6 (Central Standard Time)

San Pedro Amuzgos (Mixtec: Yodzotaca, 'Plain of the Bird's Nest') is a town and municipality in Oaxaca in south-western Mexico. It is part of Putla District in the west of the Sierra Sur Region.

External image
- Fuente y Palacio San Pedro Amuzgos
