= Handcrafts and folk art in Guanajuato =

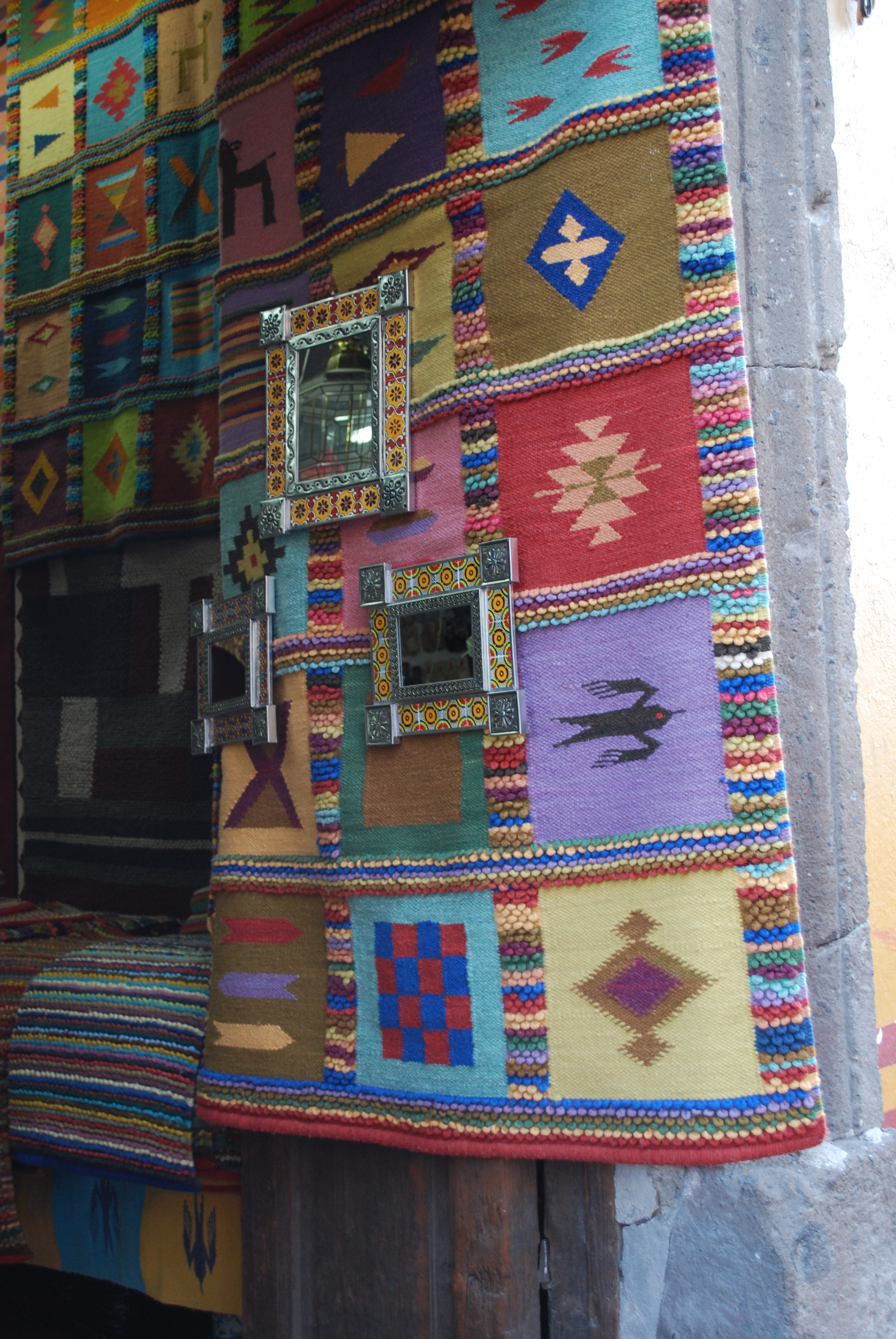
Entrance to a handcrafts store in San Miguel de Allende with rug and metal-framed mirrors

Guanajuato handcrafts and folk art are mostly of European origin, although some indigenous work still survives in some communities. The most notable craft is the making of glazed mayolica pottery, followed by handmade traditional toys of various materials, especially a hard paper mache called cartonería. While handcrafts are not a large an industry here as in some other states, it does have several major handcraft markets which sell to tourists and foreign residents. Other handcraft traditions include wrought iron work, tin and glass, wood carving and leather working.

== Overview ==
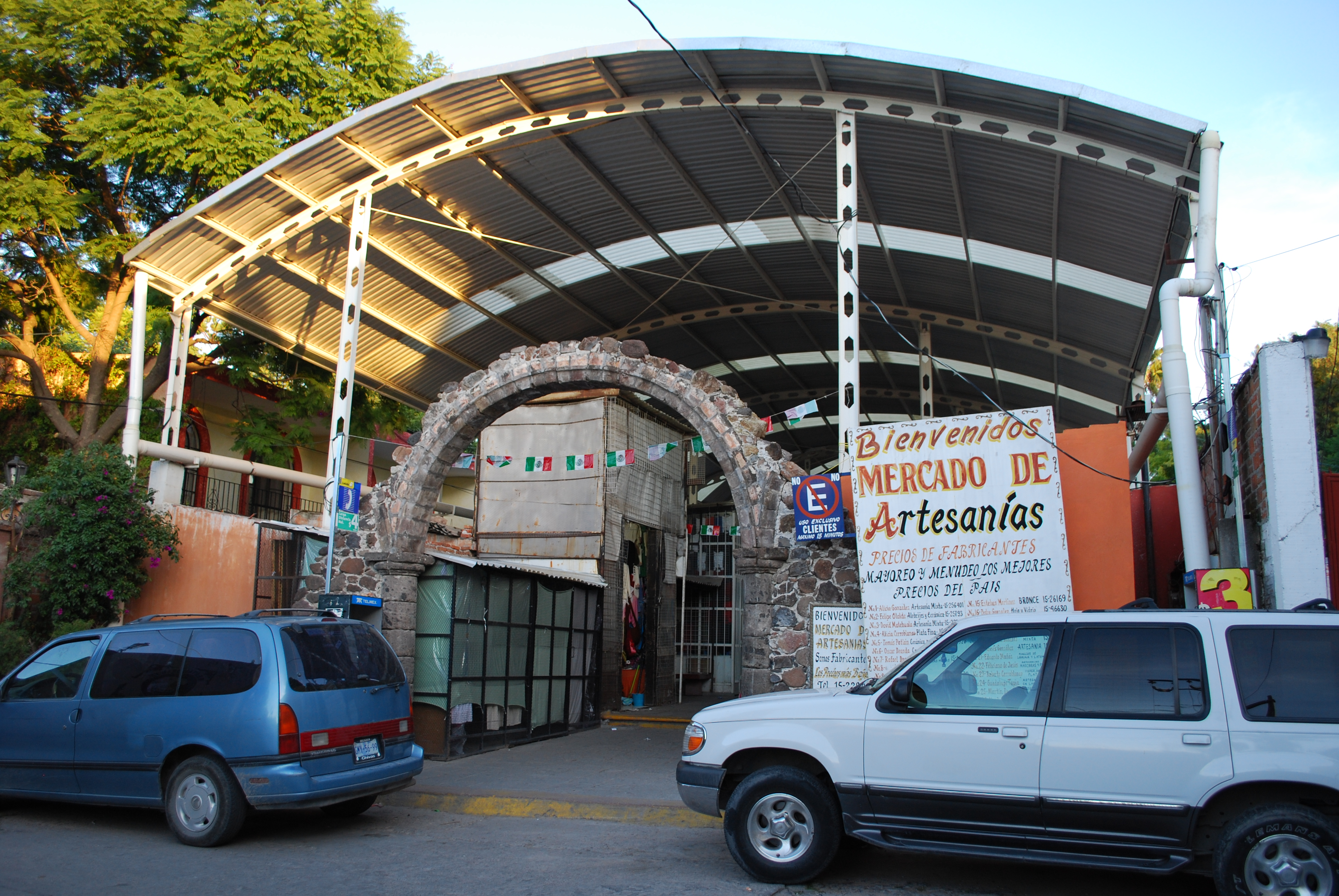
Entrance to handcrafts market in San Miguel de Allende

The handcrafts of Guanajuato are dominated by products and designs of European origin, such as glazed pottery, serapes, rebozos, tin wares, wrought iron and silver work, although what is made and how they look vary among the various communities of the state. They are more austere than those of other parts of Mexico which has a wider variety of brighter colors due to more indigenous influence. However, there are some crafts that show influence from the indigenous groups of the state (Otomi, Purhepecha and Chichimeca Jonaz, but they are very local.

Unlike many other craft producing states, most Guanajuato artisans are full-time, with few alternation this activity with agriculture. However, the number of craftsmen is limited, and the state does not produce the same quantities as states such as Chiapas, Guerrero, Oaxaca or Michoacán. Like craftsmen from other areas, they can come from families who have producing a particular craft for generations or be new to the activity because of the popularity of Mexican handcrafts with tourists and collectors. In the first quarter of 2014, exports of Guanajuato handcrafts and furniture totaled 47.69 million USD; however, this number come from only forty enterprises which export.

Many of the wares are sold in major outlets such as the city of Guanajuato and San Miguel de Allende, making them important destinations for handcraft shoppers. This is particularly true of San Miguel de Allende, as it is popular with US tourists and retirees. It not only sells wares from the state but from other parts of Mexico as well. One noted outlet for Guanajuato wares is the La Casa del Diseño en San Miguel de Allende, which has been in the Llamas family since the early 20th century. In addition to selling wares from Guanajuato and other parts of Mexico, it is also a family workshop, that produced tin and glass items.

== Types of crafts ==
=== Pottery ===
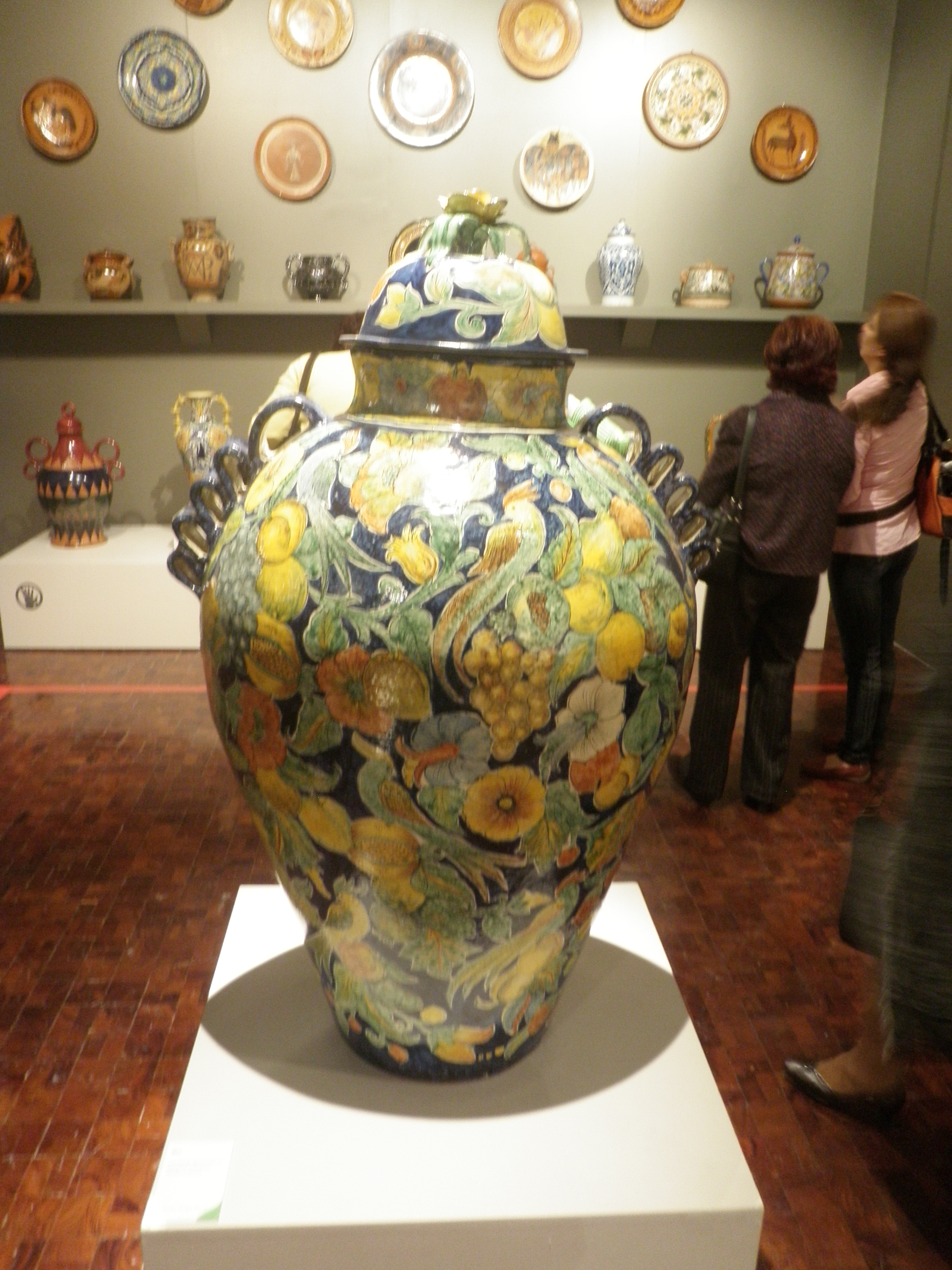
Mayolica large vessel called a tibor from Salamanca at the Museo de Arte Popular

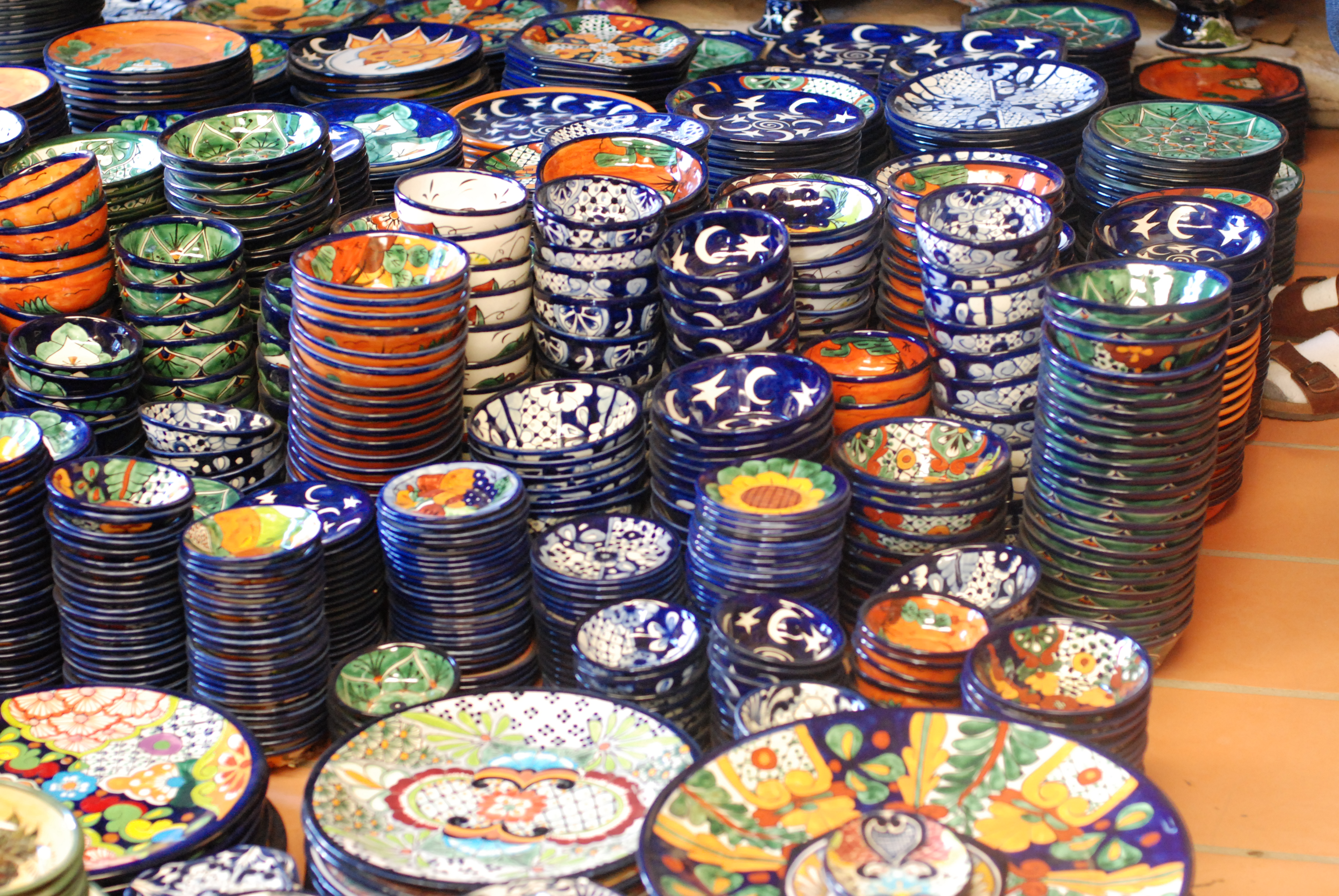
Wares from Dolores Hidalgo

Guanajuato produces both glazed and unglazed pottery. In small indigenous communities, brown pieces with black decoration are produced. The city of Guanajuato makes black ceramics with gold decoration, a style introduced by an artisan named Behrens. It is not traditional but his work has been imitated, often not to the same quality. However, a glazed ware called mayolica is the most representative handcraft of the state.

This pottery has its origins in the wares covered in a thick white glaze, brought to Mexico by the Spanish in the 16th century under the same name. Its making in Guanajuato was established in the colonial period, when it evolved to take on its own look. It flourished here because of the wealth that the state’s silver mines produced, allowing for the creation of luxury items as well as more common pieces. The technique, which has not changed much over the past 400 years, has been used to make plates, jars, storage containers, cups, mugs, bottles, flowerpots and more. Decorative motifs have not changed much since the colonial period either. Some of these designs were copied from Spanish pieces, but were adapted to Mexican tastes. Today designs generally include animals, plants and human (from popular culture and history), along with stripes and geometric patterns.

The color scheme of mayolica ware is vivid but distinct from others in Mexico. The technique has the same origin as the better-known Talavera pottery of Puebla, and can have many of the same colors; however, the term talavera is legally reserved only for ceramics produced in certain parts of Puebla.

While made in various parts of the Bajío region of the state, the two main centers of production and sale are Dolores Hidalgo and the city of Guanajuato. Workshops range from small family concerns to large businesses with high production. Some of the most prestigious workshops are in Dolores Hidalgo, where it is said that Father Hidalgo introduced the craft. The clay used for mayolica pottery in the state is also mined near here. Most of the traditional designs are present in this work, especially the typical floral decoration, polychrome over a white background, often with reds and greens. However, there is evidence of industrialization.

Mayolica wares have won national competitions and are sold throughout Mexico and abroad. One notable artisan is Gorky Gonzalez, winner of Mexico National Prize for Arts and Sciences. Gonzalez reproduces colonial era pieces, from pieces that survive from the era as well as original pieces based on the old designs. One common motif is the eagle from the Mexican seal, portrayed with wings spread.

=== Traditional toys ===
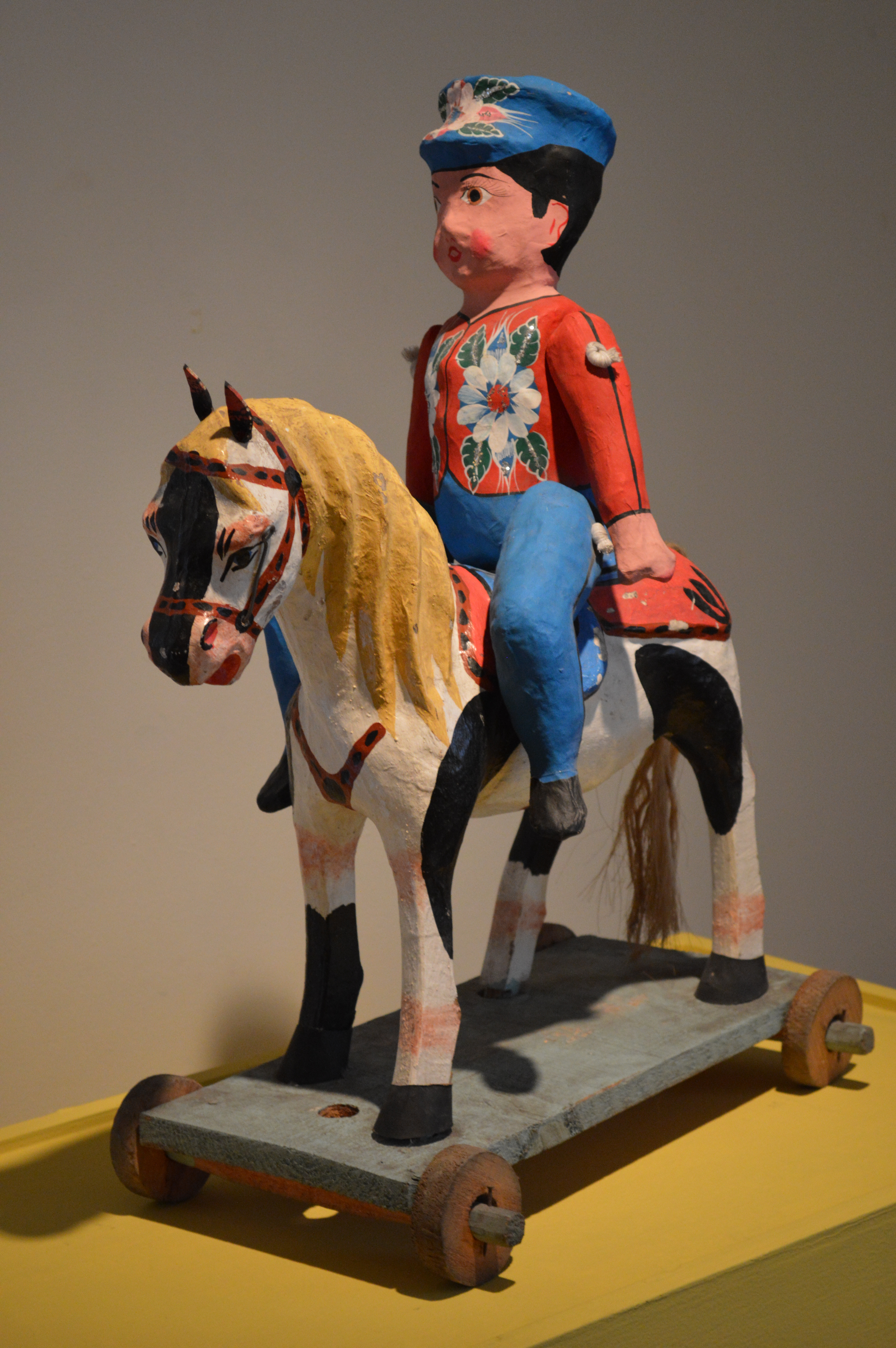
Soldier and rider of cartonería from Celaya

Many of Mexico’s traditional toys are not unique to the country, but they have developed their own styles. The most traditional are handcrafted from various materials and remain popular, although they have lost ground to mass-produced items. They have also become collector’s items, despite the fact that they are generally not marked by the maker. This also makes it difficult for Guanajuato toys having a denominación de origen despite the well-established tradition.

The toys are made in various communities such as Guanajuato, San Miguel de Allende, Dolores Hidalgo, San Luis de la Paz, San Felipe Torres Mochas, San Francisco del Rincón, Silao, Irapuato, Celaya, Juventino Rosas and Jerúcaro. The main market for them is Celaya, especially those made of cartonería (a hard paper mache) or tin. The highest demand for this toys is for Christmas, Epiphany (Three Kings’ Day) and Corpus Christi.

Many of the traditional toys are made from cartoneria, as Guanajuato is a major producer of items from this material. It is used to make dolls (Lupitas), charro figures, masks and more in towns such as San Miguel de Allende, Cortázar, Silao, Celaya, San Miguel de Allende and Juventino Rosas. Celaya is particularly noted for making cartonería toys, and Judas figures, as well as mojigangas and more.

Toys, especially miniatures, are carved from wood, which includes dollhouse furniture, jointed animal figures and human figures such as boxers. Juventino Rosas and Silao are particularly noted for this work and one notable craftsman was Gumersindo España Olivares, whose work was commented upon by chronicler Juventino Rosas.

Clay miniatures called arroz (rice) or arrocito (rice) are made, generally to form dish like objects for dollhouses. This include items such as plates, jars, cups, flags, teapots and more, generally in colors such as brown, red, blue, green and yellow. Small cupboard of white copillo wood are made to store and display these.

Small baskets and figures of tin and lead are also made.

=== Textiles ===
In the past, Guanajuato produced a significant amount of cotton textiles, especially rebozos. At its height, they were made in towns such as Valle de Santiago, Yurirapundaro, Leon, Uriangato and Moroleón, but today only León makes a small quantity of good quality cotton rebozos.

Wool textiles remain important, woven or knitted in a number of towns. These include the high-quality sarapes woven in Coroneo and San Luis de la Paz. The ones from Coroneo are generally black and white, with diamond, circles and snake patterns. Wool is also woven to make jorongos, rebozos, rugs and cushions, and knitted to make sweaters, vests, socks, scarves, gloves and hats. Some workshop still work with old pedal looms.

San Miguel de Allende makes sarapes with modern decorative designs in multiple colors.

=== Leather working ===
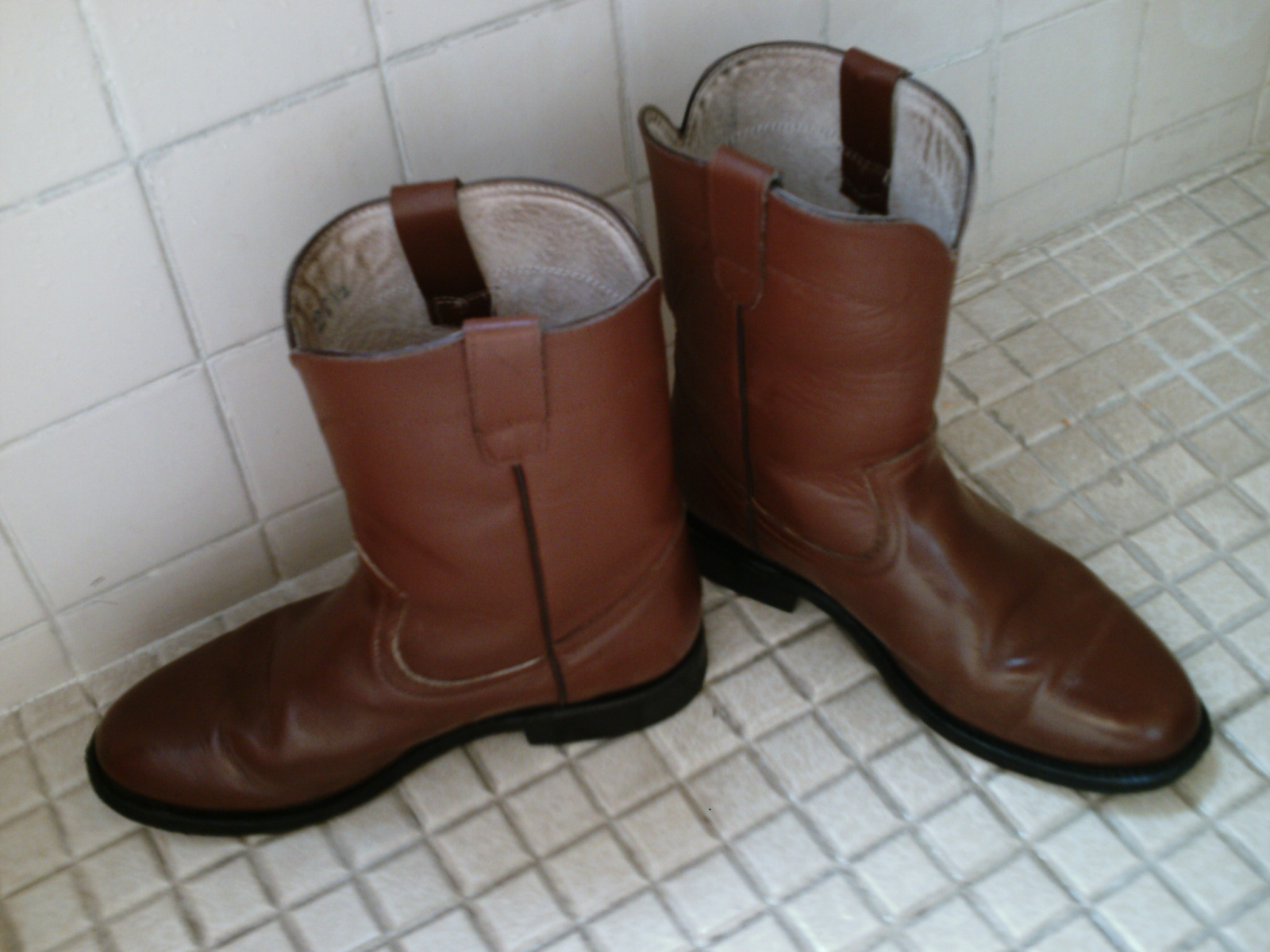
Leather boots from León

León is known for its leatherworking and shoe making. Although best known for shoes, a variety of handcrafted leather items are made such as huaraches, belts, bags and briefcases. Leather workshops in Leon also work in newer designs, especially in women’s handbags, such as the leather and woven palm bags are made in Leon at Estación del Ferrocarril de León and at Árbol de Viento.

=== Glass ===
The art of blowing glass was brought to the state from Europe. One center for its production is San Miguel de Allende, used to make bottles, vases, cups and shot glasses. One noted artisan here is Javier Alvarez Domenzain, who works at his Factory called Gajuye. Glass is also paired with tin to make mirrors, boxes and lamps in various shapes.

=== Metal working ===
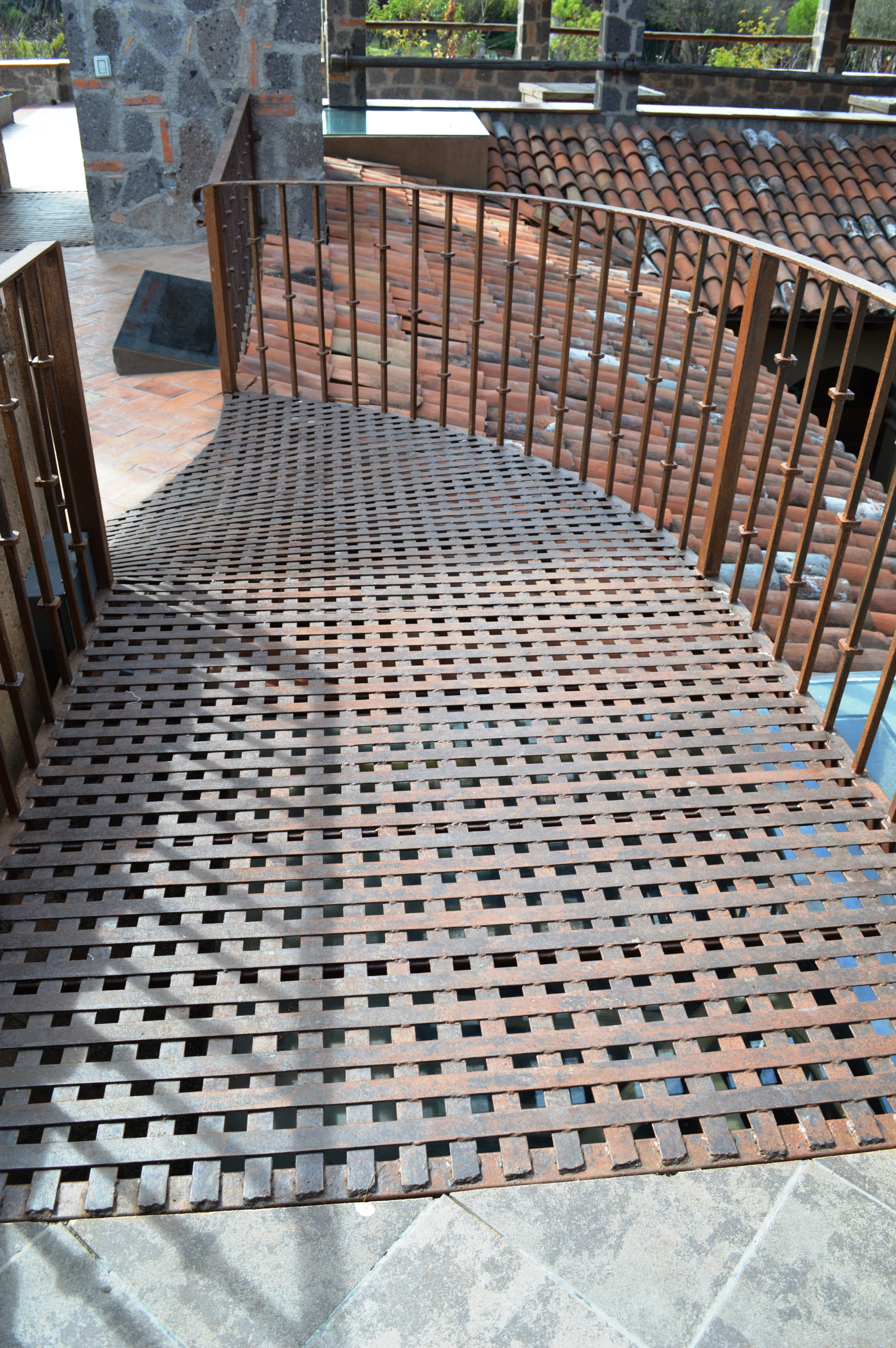
Wrought iron bridge connection two upper decks of the main house of the Hacienda Santa Clara Study and Research Center in San Miguel Allende, Mexico

Despite its history as a silver mining center, there is only a small amount of silver smithing done in the state. There are only three or four silver workshops in the city of Guanajuato, focusing on fine jewelry.

Wrought ironwork can be found on many of the state’s buildings as balcony railings, lampposts, doors and more. It is also used to make furniture pieces such as tables and chairs. Iron and steel are also used to make knives, machetes and accessories for charros, especially in León.

San Migue de Allende makes items tin. The most important item of this type are framed mirrors, with the tin frames often containing ceramic tile.

Bronze pieces with patina are made in Salamanca. The green tinge is produced by coating the pieces with chemicals.

=== Wax ===
Wax figures were once very popular in the state but this has almost died out. Sculpted wax candles are candles adorned with elaborate arrangement of wax shavings, shaped into motifs such as flowers, animals, geometric figures and more. In Mexico, the craft is known as cera escamada (flaked wax). This was introduced by the Spanish monks to have indigenous craftsmen create these candles for special occasions. These pieces can be quite large, weighing up to 50 kilos. Today, most are made for feast days of patron saints and for handcraft competitions, but only in the city of Salamanca.

=== Other items ===
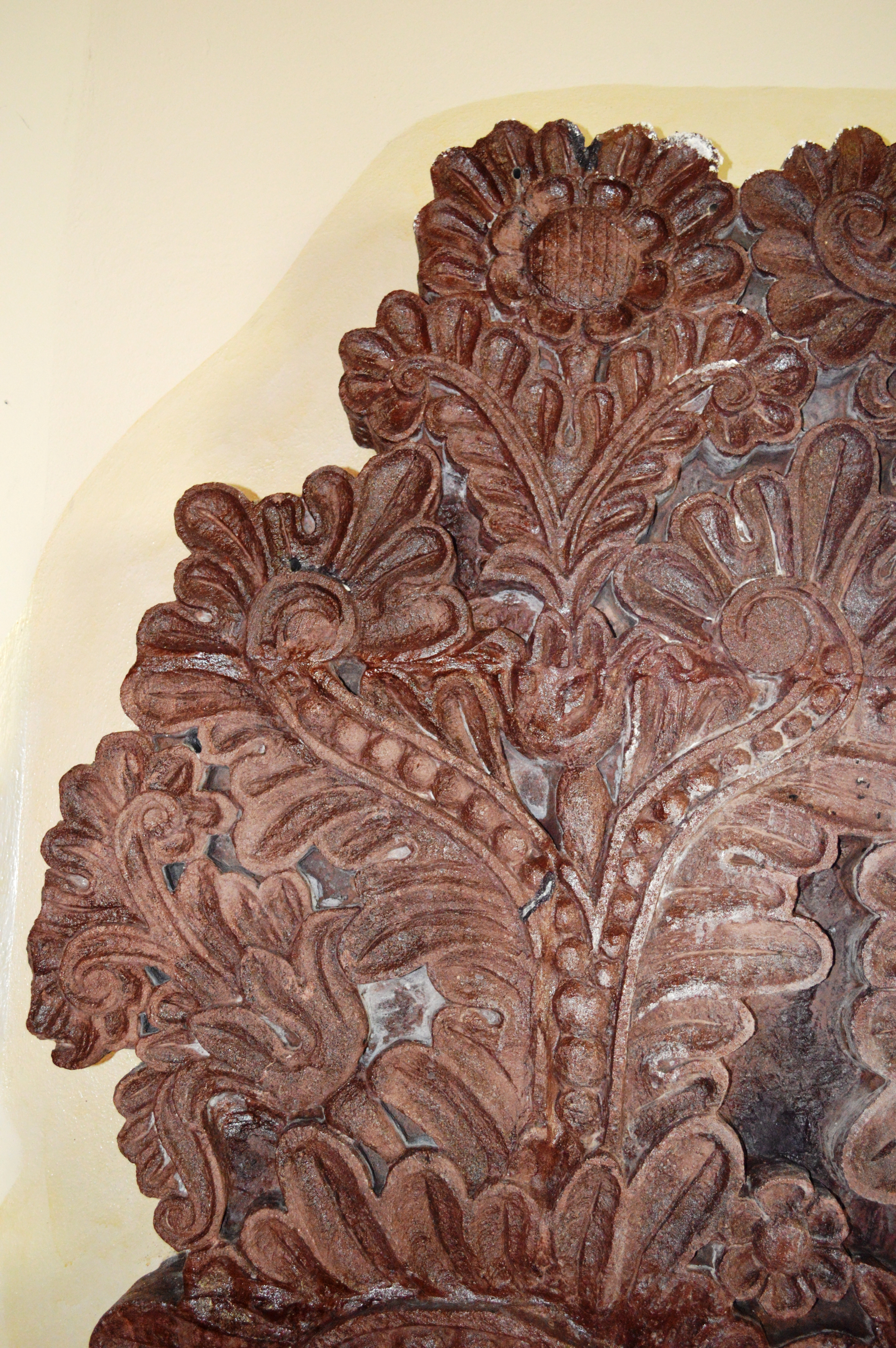
Detail of stonework inside the chapel of the Hacienda Santa Clara

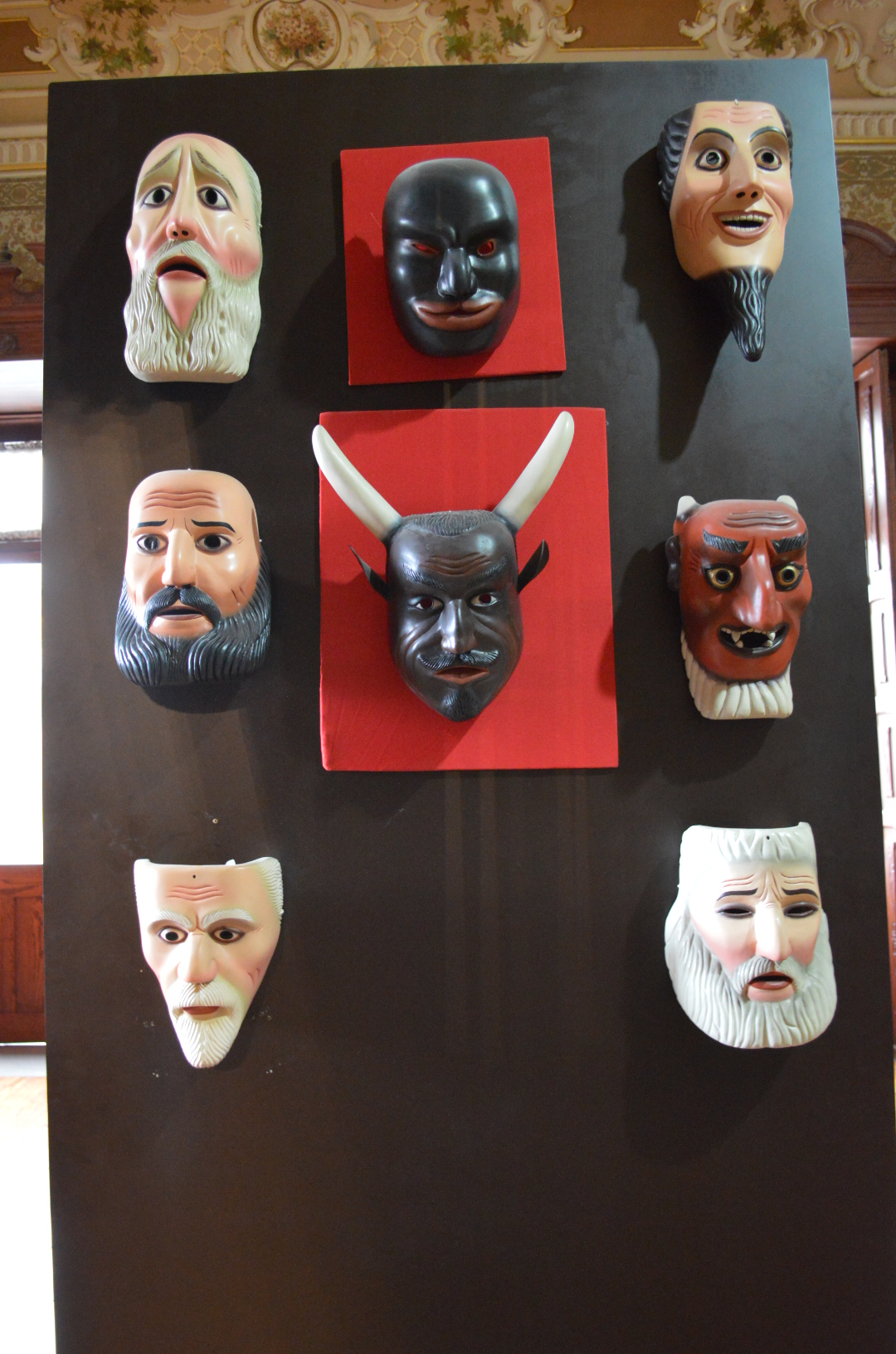
Masks from the state at the Museo Nacional de la Máscara

Charro suits are made in several parts of the state, with the hats made in San Francisco del Rincón of particular note. Since the 18th century, traditionally these are made from palm fronds brought from Michoacán. Generally the work is divided by sex, with women creating and sew the thin braiding. The men do the rest, pressing, shaping and finishing. Today, much of the palm is being replaced by synthetic fiber.

During the colonial period, wood was used for the sculpting of most religious icons for churches and homes. This tradition continues in Guanajuato, keeping most of the original Baroque style. One town particularly noted for this work is Apaseo el Grande.

The making of traditional sweets is important. The most notable is the cajete (dulce de leche) made in Celaya. The wide variety of fruits that grow in the state, especially in the Bajio, are made into sweet pastes called ate. In the city of Guanajuato candies called charamuscas correosas (chewy taffy) and no correosas (non-chewy taffy) are made. Both come in a variety of colors and are distinguished by being in the shape of mummies, mimicking the famous ones found in the capital.

Other crafts in the state include baskets in Coroneo, belts decorated with ixtle thread (piteado) in Manuel Doblado, ixtle items in Penjamo, masks for the Torito Dance in Silao, and items made from volcanic stone in Comonfort.

== Notable artisans ==
- Gorky González Quiñones
- Ángel Gil
