= Nancy Glenn-Nieto =

American painter

Nancy Glenn Nieto
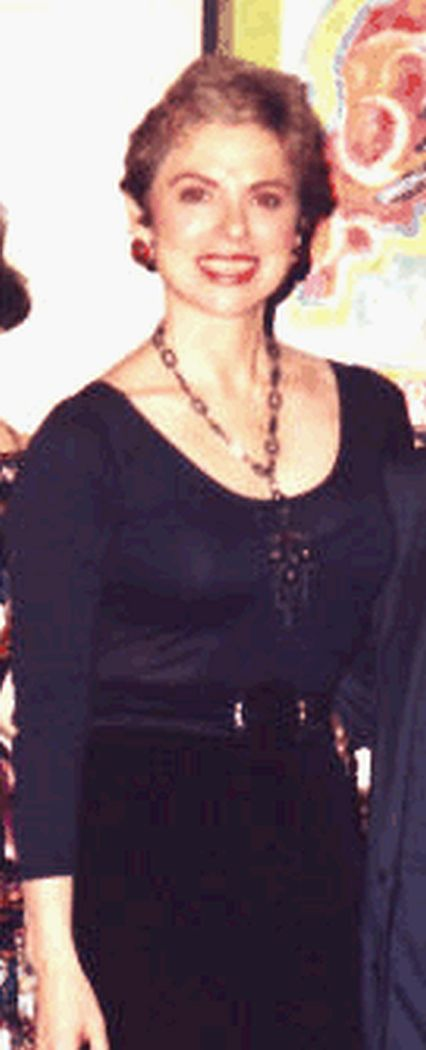
- San Francisco, Calif. c. 1994, Nancy Glenn Nieto's Art Exhibit at the Argonaut Club
- Born: Nancy Linda Hoskins; September 20, 1944 (age 80); Oklahoma, U.S.
- Other names: Nancy Nieto
- Occupation(s): Model, actress, fine arts painter
- Years active: 1960–present
- Works: Skull art
- Spouse: Rodolfo Nieto (m. 1971; died 1985)

Nancy Glenn-Nieto (born September 20, 1944) is an American-Mexican actress, model, and fine art painter. She is perhaps best known as a model and an actress in Mexico City; however, her art work has become highly collectable. She is the widow of Mexican Oaxacan painter Rodolfo Nieto.

== Early life ==
Born Nancy Hoskins in Oklahoma to Howard Hoskins (March 1, 1911 – 1995), an engineer for Douglas Aircraft Company, and Mary Hoskins, (July 29, 1922 – March 6, 2014) a school teacher; when a child she moved with her family to Southern California. During her girlhood she spent a good deal of time with her maternal grandmother Herminia Matuse Harrel (May 7, 1889 – January 23, 1995) who was born and raised in Cruces, Chihuahua, Mexico. Nancy became enchanted with her grandmother's stories that created colorful contrasting views of a country full of culture, music, and art, but politically on the brink of upheaval with individuals such as Porfirio Díaz, Pancho Villa and Emiliano Zapata and how her grandmother escaped the Mexican Revolution of 1911 crossing the Rio Grande into the safety of El Paso, Texas. Growing up in a family of two cultures, Nancy integrated both with equal value into her personal perspective.

Her interest in art began when she was a little girl. She liked to draw pictures of the neighborhood dogs and cats, often bringing them into her home. Her mother remembered this time with "Nancy was always bringing a stray cat or dog home. She'd feed them, and soon they became part of our family." During her high school years, her first job was painting Christmas scenes on the local merchant's shop window.

While Nancy liked to paint and draw, she also liked the attention she got when she won the Miss Los Angeles beauty contest. That same year at 23 years old she entered the Queen of the Pacific Beauty Pageant held in Melbourne, Australia, as the representative from California.

== Mexico City ==
After graduating University of California, Santa Barbara, with a degree in Fine Art, Nancy's identification with her grandmother motivated her to get to know her grandmother's Mexican roots. After traveling throughout Mexico, she decided to establish herself in Mexico City. While visiting an art gallery in the bohemian Zona Rosa, Mexico City, she was spotted by Ned Motola the publicity director of the Mexico City office of the international publicity company Doyle Dane and Bernbach. Impressed with her shapely legs, he offered her a contract to model in commercials for his client Christian Dior's leg wear. From that national exposure, her modeling career blossomed. Soon she became one of Mexico's top models. Large international companies used her image to advertise their product. She appeared on billboards, TV commercials, magazines such as Vanity, in major newspapers, and she modeled in Haute couture fashion shows for Catalina Swimwear, Chanel, Dior, and El Palacio de Hierro. Not unlike the well known model Suzy Parker, modeling became Nancy's springboard into acting in movies that is until her marriage to Rodolfo Nieto.

== Marriage ==
Newly married to the fine arts painter Rodolfo Nieto, her husband preferred that she did not continue to work in movies because when she was on location, he missed her. On the other hand, modeling took her away from home for a few hours; therefore, he encouraged her to continue modeling. Which she did when she was not helping him prepare canvasses. Rodolfo Nieto was a prolific painter who often worked on numerous canvasses—up to ten canvasses at one time—he'd work intensely for long periods of time at home in his studio.

They had met at the grand opening of the Polyforum Cultural Siqueiros named after the Mexican muralist David Alfaro Siqueiros. Nancy was impressed with Rodolfo's "impeccable sense of style. When I first saw him-- tall and lean, with a shock of dark wavy hair that contrasted interestingly with his cat-like green eyes, he was wearing a beautiful European cut tweed jacket, with corduroy trousers, a silk shirt, and a pink ascot around his neck." He likewise was attracted to the beautiful actress / model, but when he discovered that she also was a painter, a few months later on September 11, 1971, they married in the Civil registry in the Colonia Coyoacán.

They spent years together painting with a constant effort to stretch their artistic endeavors. Blending the Mexican tradition and contemporary art concepts, they studied Pre-Columbian art and architecture in Oaxaca, Jalapa, Guerrero, Veracruz, Chiapas and Mexico City. They also visited European museums and lived for a while in Paris. A devotion to the creative experience was the uniting bond between the two artists whose favorite evening activity was listening to music and studying art books.

== Skull Art ==
After Rodolfo Nieto's death in June 1985, the following November 1st—the Day of the Dead—in her home she decorated an altar with his photograph at the center surrounded with things he enjoyed in life, such as fruits, a bottle of wine, and bread; along with little Calaveras or skulls made of sugar and Cempasúchil. In the ancient Mexican tradition where the worship of death involved the worship of new life: the skull – symbol of death – was a promise to resurrection. Subsequently, she began a series of paintings that depicted the mysterious character of the ancient celebration of the skull. Her series initiated and defined the genre of Skull Art.

Later the Mexican Cultural Institute impressed with her Skull Art invited her to exhibit for the Day of the Dead in the Mexican consulates, where she would install elaborate altars surrounded with her paintings of "skull trees," odd parrots, and the living dead.

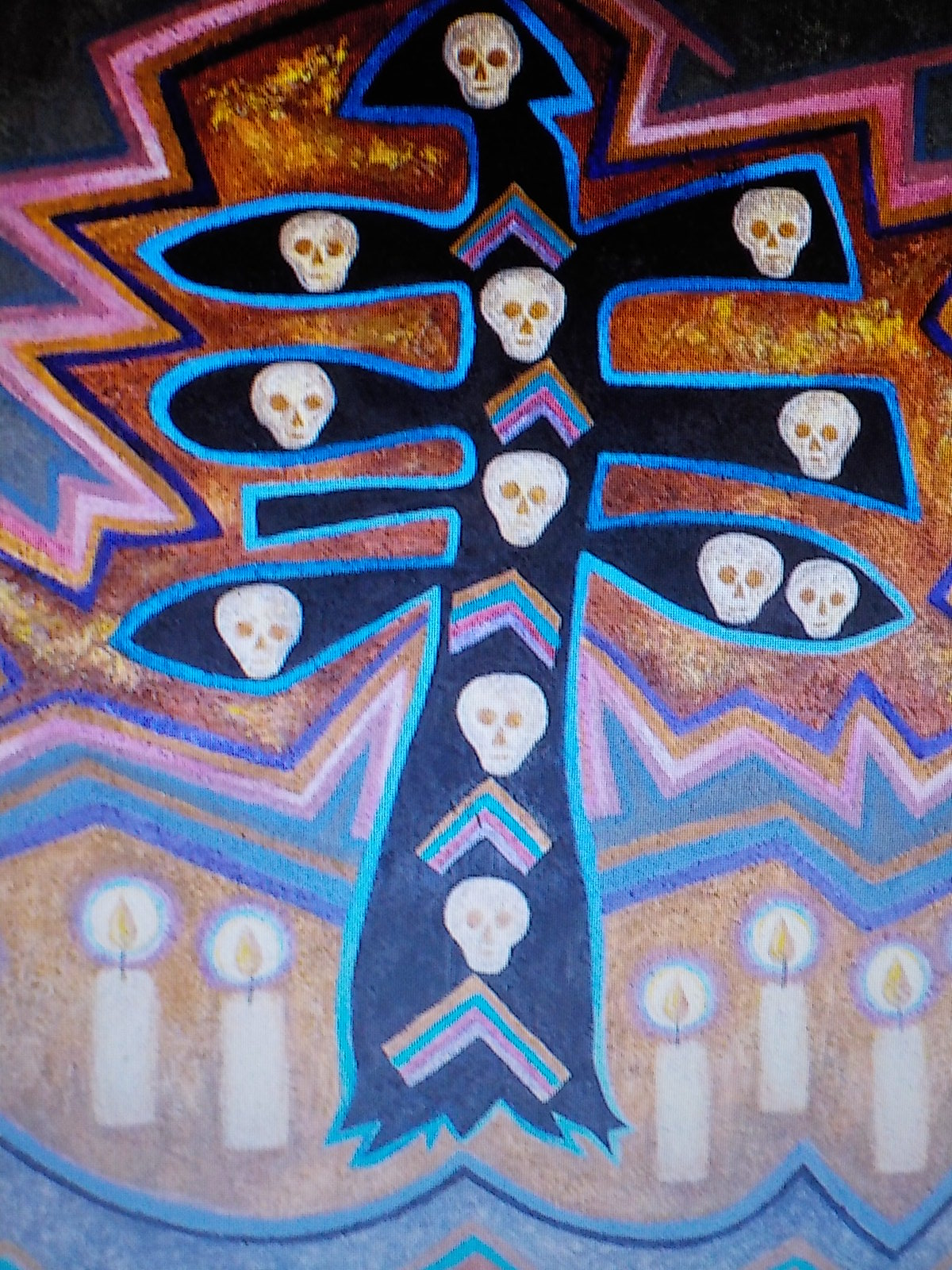
Skull Tree with Candles

== Major themes ==
Nancy's major themes are mystical animals, colorful flowers, and powerful saints; she explains "I have developed my own style." That has become a combination of Mexican folklore, realism, and American pop art where rich colors saturate the canvass evoking Picassoesque images placed on firm construction lines. Like a novel with a reliable narrator, it pleases. "When you live with such a great artist (Rodolfo Nieto) for so long, you begin to feel like you have no talent at all. But little by little, I got my courage up and began to have shows."

== Partial filmography ==
Year	Title	Role	Notes
1969	Valentin Armienta el vengador		
1969	La marcha de Zacatecas	Mary, the American	
1969	Trampas de amor	Annette (segment "El dilemma")	
1970	El manantial del amor		
1970	Paraíso (1970 film)	Guera (as Nancy Glenn)	
1971	Siempre hay una primera vez	(segment "Isabel")	
1979	La Colorina		Telenovela
1985	Gavilán o paloma (film)		

== Partial list of exhibitions ==
- 1984 "The Cats and My Scratches" The Cultural House of News Writers, Mexico City, Mexico
- 1986 "You and I" The Cultural House of Tepepan, Tepepan, Mexico
- 1987 "Dragons" Omen Crow Studio, Tarzana, California
- 1989 "The Mulata from Cordoba" Museum of the City of Veracruz, Port of Veracruz, Veracruz
- 1989 "Melaza and I" Exhibition Hall Hotel Las Cavas, Tequisquiapan, Querétaro
- 1989 "Flowers" Querétaro State Fair 1989, Querétaro, Querétaro
- 1990 "My Show" Linea Mobile, Mexico City, Mexico
- 1990 "Fantasy Animals" Villasenor Library, San Bernardino, California
- 1990 "Fantasy Animals" Lake Arrowhead County Library, Blue Jay, California
- 1990 "Fantasy Animals" Polyforum Cultural Siqueiros, Mexico City, Mexico
- 2019 "Nancy Glenn Nieto Gala" August 30, 2019, Kris Gonzalez, curator, Enterprise Building, San Bernardino, California
- 2019 "Paint and Sip with Nancy Glenn Nieto" Kris Gonzalez, organizer, November 1, 2019, celebration Day of the Dead, San Bernardino, California

== Part of permanent collections ==
- Polyforum Cultural Siqueiros
- Mexican Cultural Institute, Los Angeles
- Mexican Consulate, Los Angeles
- Mexican Consulate, San Diego
- Conejo Valley Art Museum
- Mexican American Bar Association
- Sun Cities Art Museum
- Hispanic Research Center of Arizona State University
- Petropavlosk Museum, Kamchatka, Russia
- United Nations Headquarters, Pasadena, California
- United States International University of San Diego
