= Acalmani =

Acalmani may refer to:

- Acalmani, Ayutla de los Libres, Guerrero, Mexico
- Acalmani, Igualapa, Guerrero, Mexico
