= Ayutla de los Libres =

City in the Mexican state of Guerrero

- Municipal seat and city
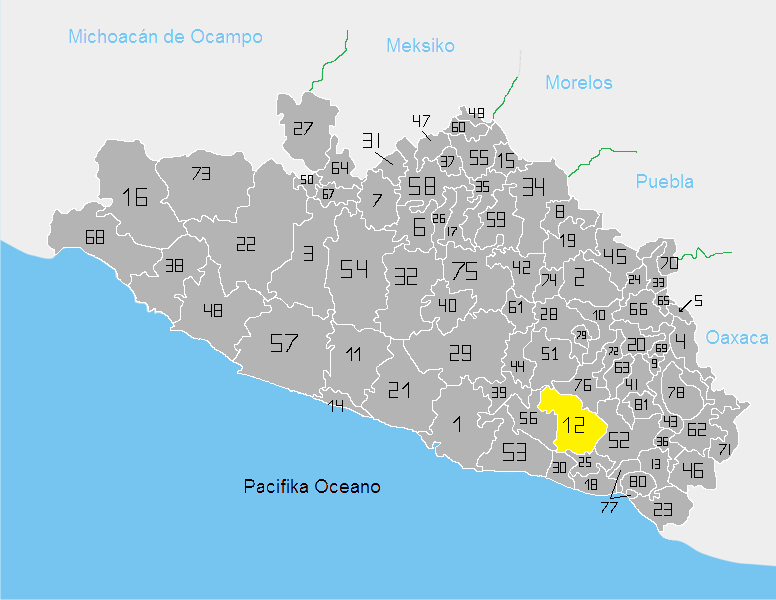

- Location in Mexico Ayutla de los Libres (Mexico)
- Coordinates: 16°54′N 99°13′W
- Country: Mexico
- State: Guerrero
- Municipality: Ayutla de los Libres

Population (2010)
  - Total: 15,370

Ayutla de los Libres (Mixtec: Tatioo) is a city and seat of the municipality of Ayutla de los Libres, in the state of Guerrero, southern Mexico. As of 2010, its population was 15,370. The city of Ayulta de los Libres is the most populous in its municipality and accounts for about a quarter of the municipality's population.

The Plan of Ayutla was proclaimed here on 1 March 1854.

== Toponymy ==
The name "Ayutla" comes from Nahuatl Ayotlan meaning "near the (place of abundance of) tortoises/turtles". The sobriquet "de los Libres" ("of the Free") was added after 1854, because the town was the place where the Ayutla Revolution started on March 1, 1854, and where the Ayutla Plan was announced.

== History ==
Before the conquest, Ayutla was a Tlapanec settlement. It was conquered by the Aztec Empire, likely during the reign of Ahuitzotl, and was transformed into a strategic province that ruled over several towns, such as Tonalá, Copala, Jalapa, Nexpa (located near modern Cruz Grande), Cuautepec, Cuilutla, Cintla (located either near Marquelia or Agua Zarca), Cahuitán, and possibly Tutepec. Most of these towns spoke either Nahuatl (concentrated on the coastal plain) or Tlapanec (concentrated inland), but Cintla and Cahuitan had their own languages, now extinct without ever being described. Ayutla paid biannual tribute in cotton, fish, jaguar and deer skins, gourds, and one gold bar three fingers thick. Gold and cacao were the most important resources of the region, and Ayutla itself specialized in jaguar skins. Ayutla was ruled by a "governor and captain" and fought wars with Jalapa and Nexpa, as well as the Yope people to the west, which led to the Mexica stationing a garrison and a calpixqui (tax-collector) at Tutepec.
