= Colotepec =

- town
- Location in Mexico
- Coordinates: 17°02′28″N 99°12′46″W
- Country: Mexico
- State: Guerrero
- Municipality: Ayutla de los Libres
- Elevation: 430 m (1,410 ft)

Population (2010)
  - Total: 2,808
- Area code: 745

Colotepec is a town in the municipality of Ayutla de los Libres, Guerrero, Mexico. It is situated at an elevation of 430 meters, and as of 2010 had a population of 2,808, up from 2,690 in 2005.

== Name ==
The name Colotepec means "Scorpion Hill" in the Nahuatl language.

== Population ==
As of 2005, the population of 2,690 consisted of 1,313 males and 1,377 females. There were 1,261 adults, of which 198 were older than 60 years of age. The remaining 1,429 inhabitants were children.

The indigenous population was 19, of which 3 people spoke indigenous languages.

== Housing ==
There are 523 homes, of which 36 are single-family homes, 141 have indoor plumbing, 420 are connected to public utilities, and 471 have electric lighting. Of the 523 homes, 13 have a computer, 21 a washing machine, and 283 a television.

== Education ==
Of the children between 6 and 14 years of age, 27 do not attend school. Of those 15 and older, 337 never attended school, 687 had not completed schooling, 261 finished basic school, and 180 had advanced education (such as high school). There are 401 illiterate people 15 and over in Colotepec. For those between 15 and 24 years of age, the median level of school attendance is 5 years. The town currently only has 2 schools.
