= Handcrafts of Guerrero =

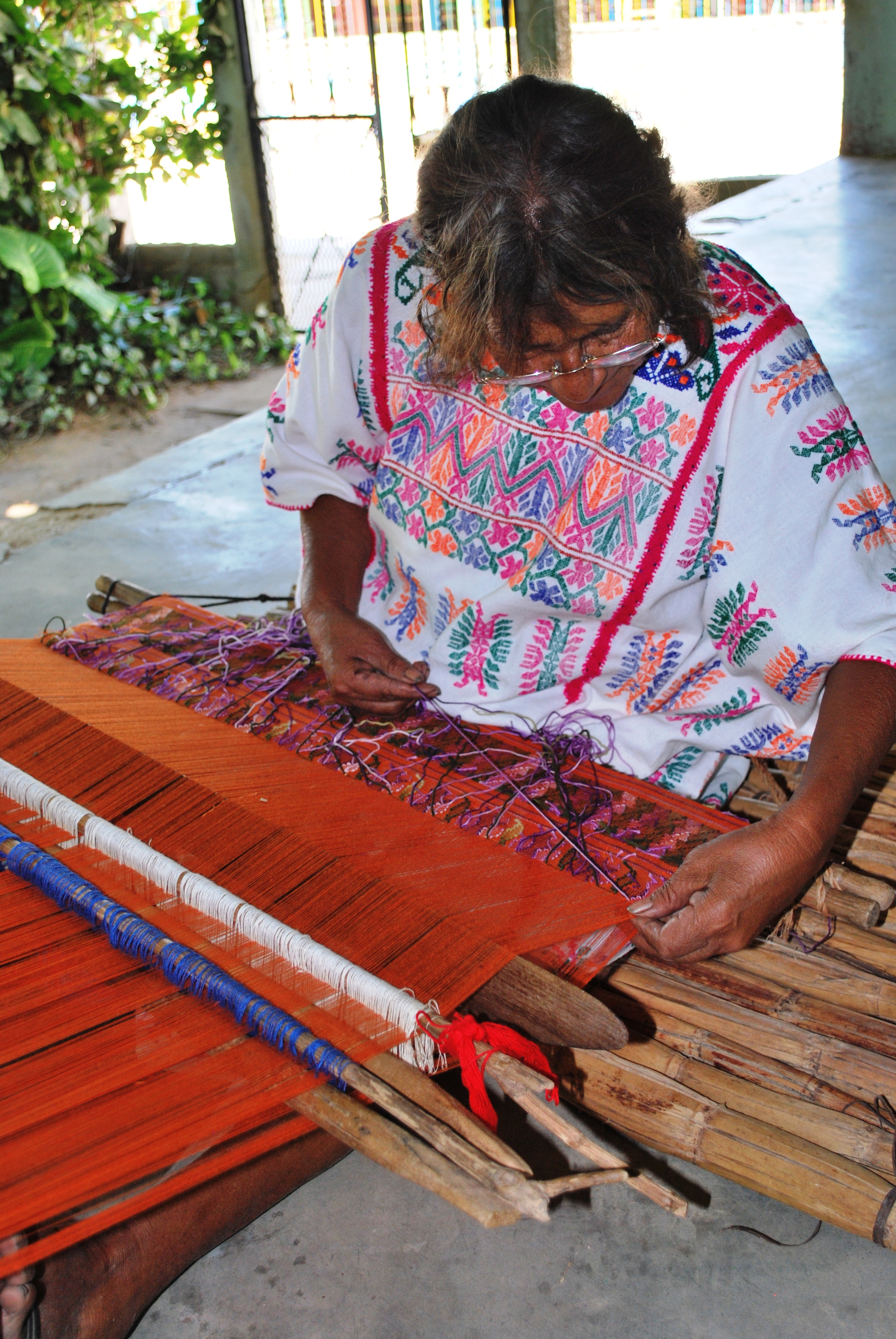
Amuzgo weaver working on a backstrap loom in Xochistlahuaca

The handcrafts of Guerrero include a number of products which are mostly made by the indigenous communities of the Mexican state of Guerrero. Some, like pottery and basketry, have existed relatively intact since the pre Hispanic period, while others have gone through significant changes in technique and design since the colonial period. Today, much of the production is for sale in the state's major tourism centers, Acapulco, Zihuatanejo and Taxco, which has influence the crafts’ modern evolution. The most important craft traditions include amate bark painting, the lacquerware of Olinalá and nearby communities and the silverwork of Taxdo.

== History ==
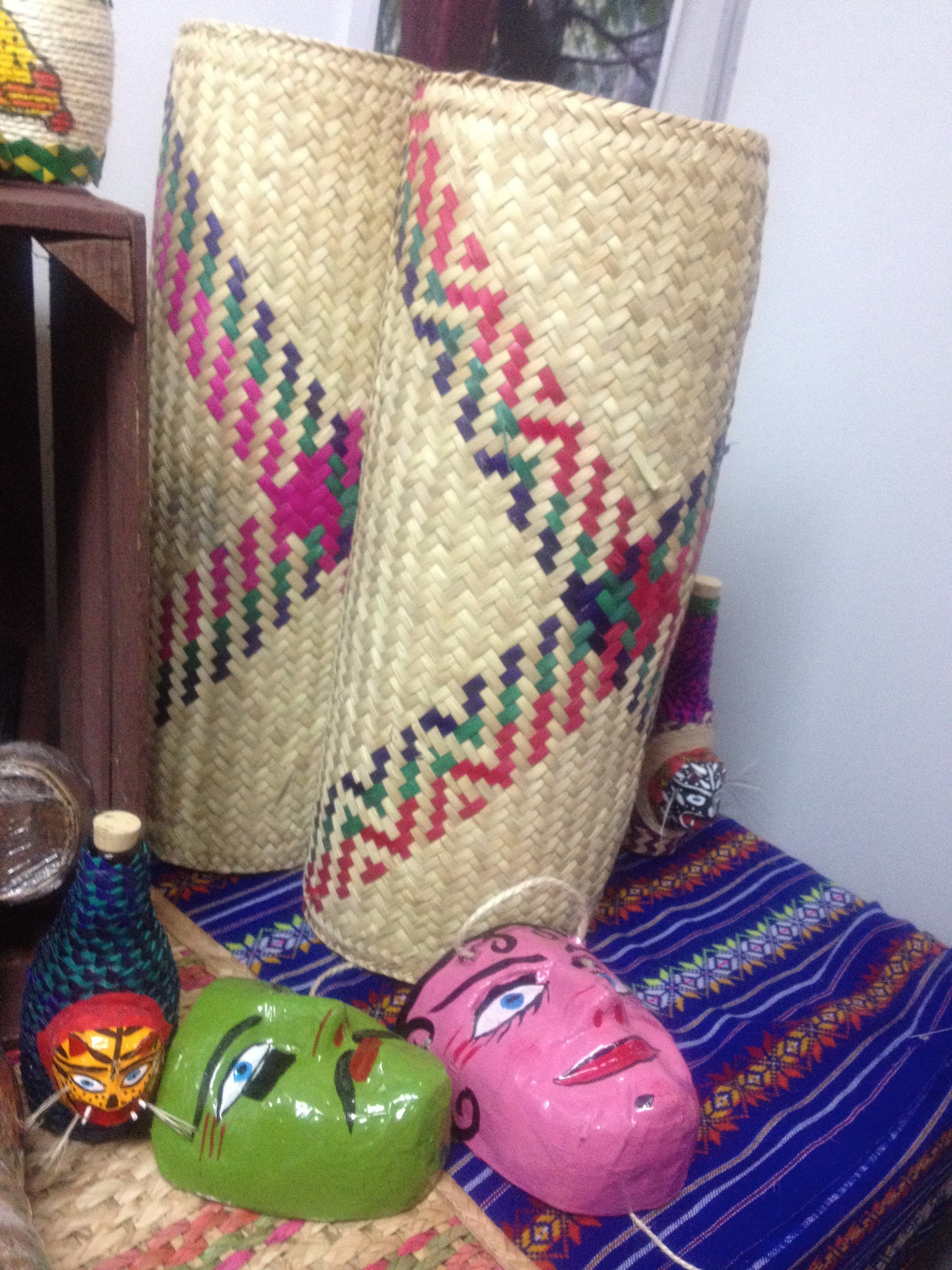
Petates from the state for sale at a fair in Mexico City

Evidence of art and handcraft production in the state dates back to about 300 BCE, with the earliest showing Olmec influence. In the 7th century, the Mezcala people established themselves in the region, introducing stone sculpture and ceramics, of Teotihuacan heritage. The Aztecs conquered much of the region, with some handcraft production becoming important tribute items, for example, gold worked into pieces for nobility and priests. After the Spanish conquest of the Aztec Empire, European techniques, designs and materials were introduced, which drastically changed how a number of products were made, and some indigenous products disappeared completely.

Many of the colonial period handcrafts, such as palm frond, metal and basket making, continue to the present day, buoyed to a large extent by tourism. In 1988 the state established an agency to preserve and preserve Guerrero's culture, including its handcrafts.

== Overview ==
The handcrafts of the state reflect its socio-economic situation. The handcraft tradition is important not only culturally, but also because it provides much of the state's income, especially in small, isolated indigenous communities, which rely on it for most or all of its income. For this reason, Guerrero's handcrafts show a strong indigenous nature, although European and even Asian influence can be seen in its aesthetics and techniques.

Modern handcraft production in the past decades has been strongly influence by sales in the state's three main tourist centers, Acapulco, Zihuatanejo and Taxco. The main handcraft market within the state is Acapulco, both for goods made in Guerrero and other parts of the country. While there are locations selling high-quality wares, most are of low quality, especially those made from seashells. Because of the mix of cultural influences, past and present, some crafts, such as pottery, show a wide range of styles and decorative motifs.

== Craft types ==
=== Paintings ===
One of the state's better known crafts is the painting of images onto amate (bark) paper, done in Nahua communities such as Ameyaltepec, Maxela, Xalitla and San Agustin de las Flores. One reason for its prominence is that it is very popular with tourists. It is popular with artisans as well, as the paintings yield a higher income than pottery.

Although more colorful, the paintings are based on the sepia designs of certain traditional pottery, which in turn have roots in pre Hispanic codices. However, since it is a new craft, it is still evolving Initially the motifs were of animals and plants but then human figures began to appear, placed in scenes and landscapes. The amate paper is not made in the state of Guerrero, but rather it is from the state of Puebla, in particular from San Pablito in the Sierra Norte region.

The paintings have become a characteristic of the state's handcraft tradition. Painters have been commissioned to create murals both in Mexico and abroad. and a number have taken the work to canvas, but still mostly sold in tourist markets.

=== Lacquerware ===
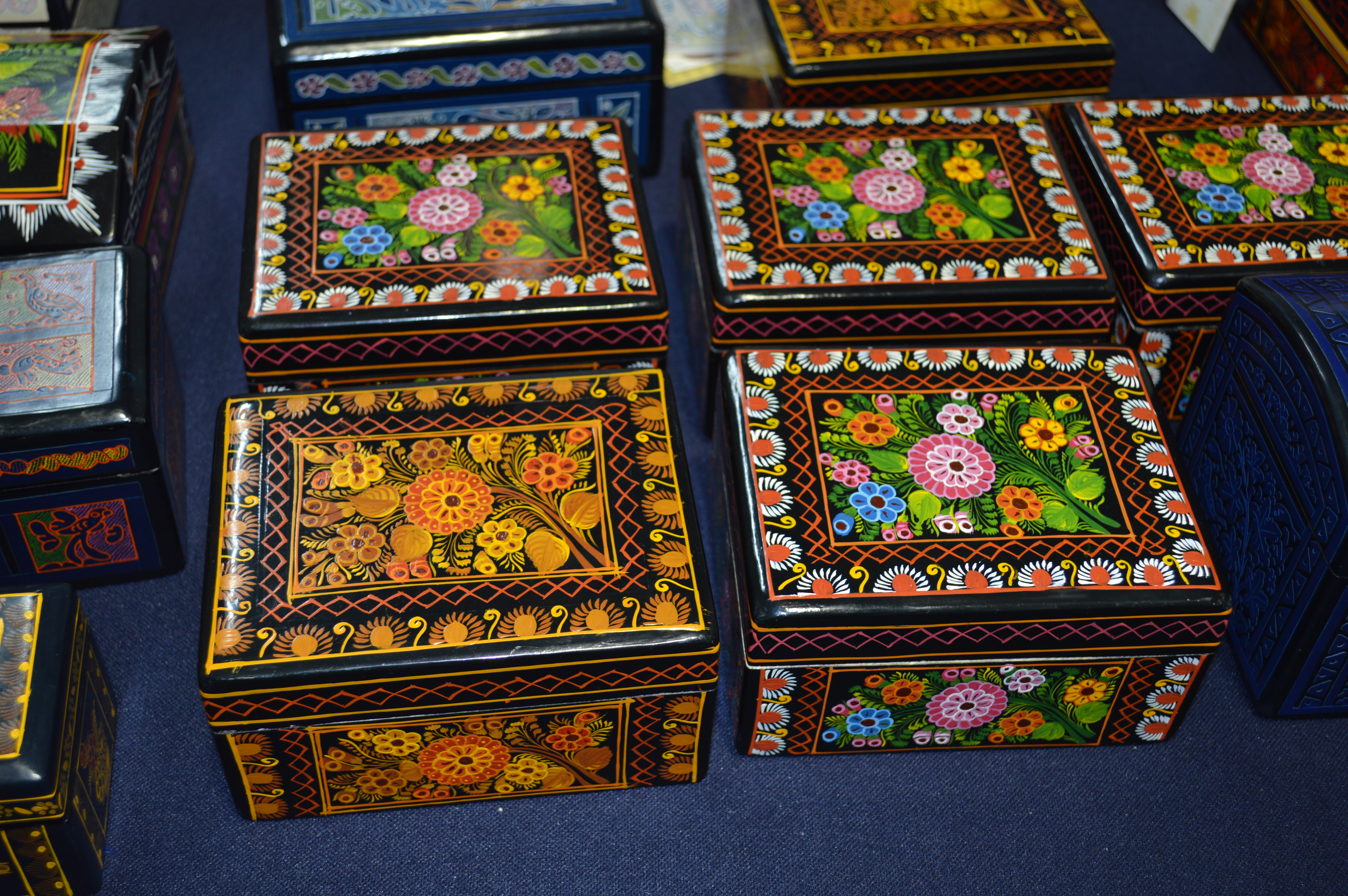
Lacquered boxes from Olinalá

Another important product is lacquerware, part of a larger Mesoamerican craft tradition. Most is produced in Olinalá, but there are also production in nearly Acapetlahuaya and Temalscacingo. Lacquer work dates back to the pre Hispanic period, when it was used to preserve and decorate wood objects, gourds and more. It survives mostly intact, with changes only in decorative motifs through the colonial period to modern times. Until recently, most wood items were made from a fragrant species called linaloe, but over exploitation has made it scarce and expensive.

While historically both chia seed oil and a waxy substance from an insect larvae were both used, today only chia seed oil is used, mixed with mineral or vegetable pigments. Most Guerrero lacquerware is distinguished by the use of a “scratch” (rayado) technique for decoration, although pieces with inlay or painted motifs are also made. The rayado technique has its origins from Asian pieces brought by the Manila Galleon, but the current incarnation became popular in the 20th century. The technique consists of two or more layers of lacquer of different colors. When the new layer is added on top of the old, it is scraped with a tool such as a quill before it is dried to expose the color underneath in areas. The designs appear to be in relief. The color is generally over a base of red, white or black. The items that are lacquered today include boxes, chests, gourds.

=== Silver and other metals ===
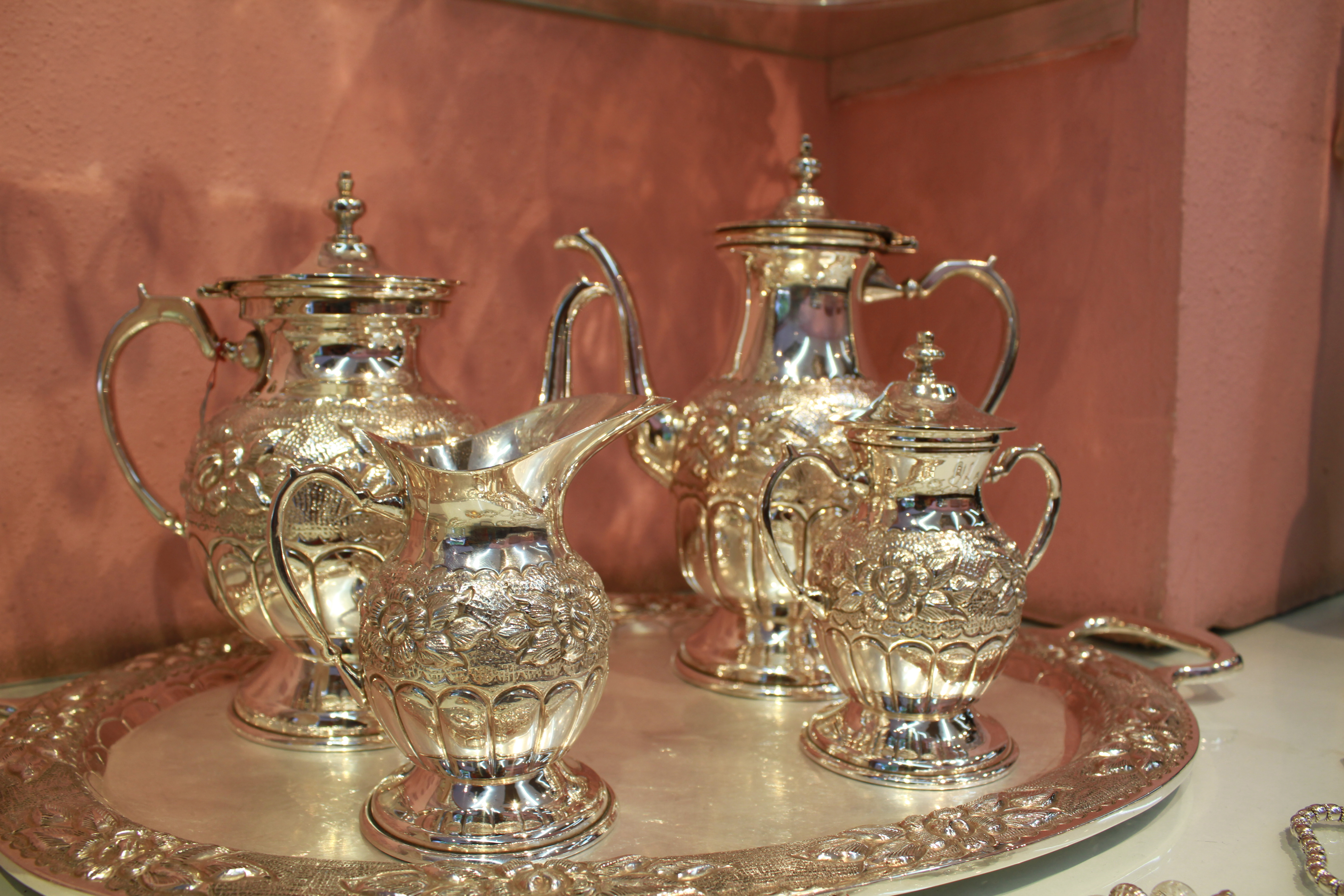
Silver set in Taxco

The working of silver and gold date from the pre Hispanic period, when these metals, especially gold, was an important tribute item. The metals were worked into ceremonial and decorative objects reserved for the nobility and priests.

Today, the best known work of this type is the silver objects, especially jewelry, produced in the mountain town of Taxco, about three hours from Mexico City. During the colonial period, the area was rich in silver, making one man, José de la Borda, particularly wealthy. However, the mines eventually dried up and the working of this metal was down to one old silversmith by 1931, when American William Spratling arrived. Believing that the handcrafting of silver should be done where the metal has a history, Spratling convinced two young gold smiths in Iguala to move to Taxco to help him open a shop. He also believed that the role of designers, was to “utilize and dignify” the material, which was a new ideal for craftsmen at the time. Spratling's shop was not only a success, he attracted apprentices who then went on to open their own shops, including noted artisans Antonio Castillo and Antonio Pineda. These new generations of silversmiths have also rescued a forgotten technique of combining different metals, which has a pre Hispanic origin, called “wedded metals.”

The craft remains important in Taxco, buoyed by the town's status as a tourist attraction, as well as the National Silver Fair (Feria Nacional de la Plata) and competition in the last week of November. Most of the town's production is sold to tourists, and is taken out of Mexico. One challenge to the silver industry has been the price of silver, which can be prohibitive to its working in small, family shops.

Gold is worked in several locations such as Iguala, Ciudad Altamirano, Cocuya de Catalan and Arcelia Ometepec, generally shaped into traditional colonial period designs. The most common type of gold used is “Huetamo”, which comes in several shades.

Iron and steel working takes place in locations such as Ayutla, Tixtla, Chilapa, Cualac, which are particularly noted for their machetes. Tin objects are made in Tlacotepec, Tlalchipa and Cuetzala del Progreso.

=== Palm frond weaving/basketry ===
The working of palm fronds was promoted in the state by friar Juan Bautista de Moya in the early colonial period. Today, it is one of the more ubiquitous and varied crafts of the state, in part because the raw material is abundant. The fronds are worked into items traditionally used by rural farm people, such as bags of various types, fans, petates and especially sombreros. The best known of these is the Tlapehuala style, named after one of the towns that make them, in both a “regular” and fine variety. However, some of these products are also sold to tourists, especially carrying bags, sombreros and small animal or human figures.

Much of the raw material comes from mountain regions in communities such as Atlixtac, Zapotitlan Tablas, Ahuacoutzingo and Copanatoyac. However, not all palm weaving centers are where the palms grow. Chilapa and Zitlala also are noted for their wares. Tlapehuala is known for the sombrero named after it, which is also produced in Chilapa, Zitlala, Zapotitlán Tablas, Tlapa and Copanatoyac.

In addition to palm fronds, reeds are worked in several parts of the state to make baskets, toys, roofing for homes, bird cages and more. Corn husks are used to make decorative items, such as artificial flowers, along with toys.

=== Pottery ===
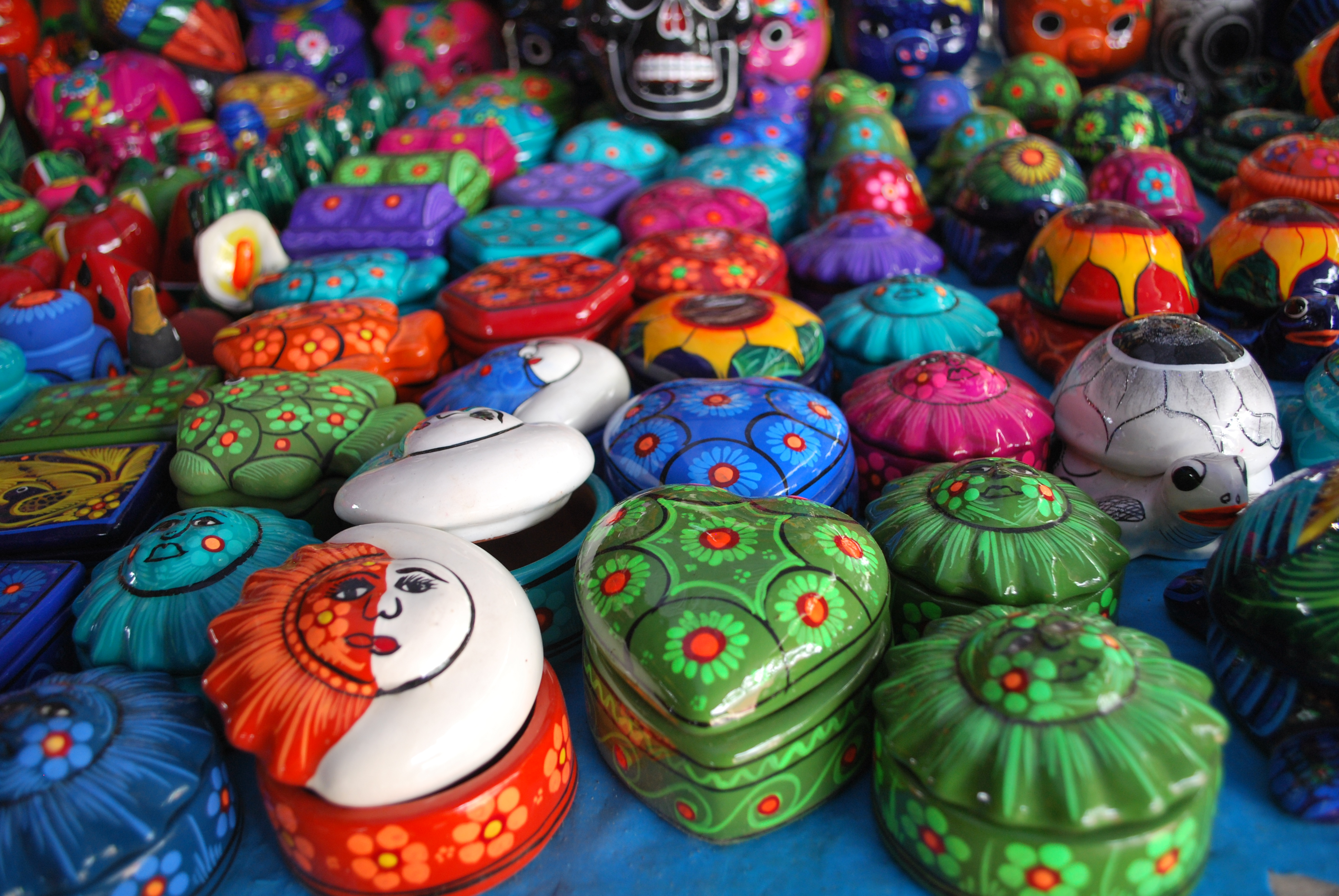
Pottery pieces for sale at a roadside stand on the highway between Mexico City and Acapulco

The creation of pottery is one of the oldest crafts of the state and is one of the most widely practiced. Many are utilitarian items such as water coolers, utensils, plates, bowls, candle holders but decorative pieces such as animal and human figures. Religious items such as nativity scenes are also made.

Pottery techniques are still mostly indigenous, including the continued practice of mixing cotton fiber into the clay to make it stronger. The best work comes from the central region, especially the towns of Zacoalpan, Nuitzalpa, Atzacualoya, Tixtla, Zumpando de Neri and Hitzuco. Often the pieces are colorfully painted. Pottery communities tend to specialize. For example, the San Juan neighborhood in Chilapa specializes in geographic motifs over glazed ceramics, and the town of Acatlan specializes in toys and figurines. The potters of Ometepec are noted for the creation of unglazed cantaro storage containers decorated in white lines and floral patterns. Most pottery is low-fire ware, which is traditional, but catering to the tourist and international markets has put pressure on artisans to incorporate more modern techniques. One of these is the increasing use of glaze.

=== Wood working ===
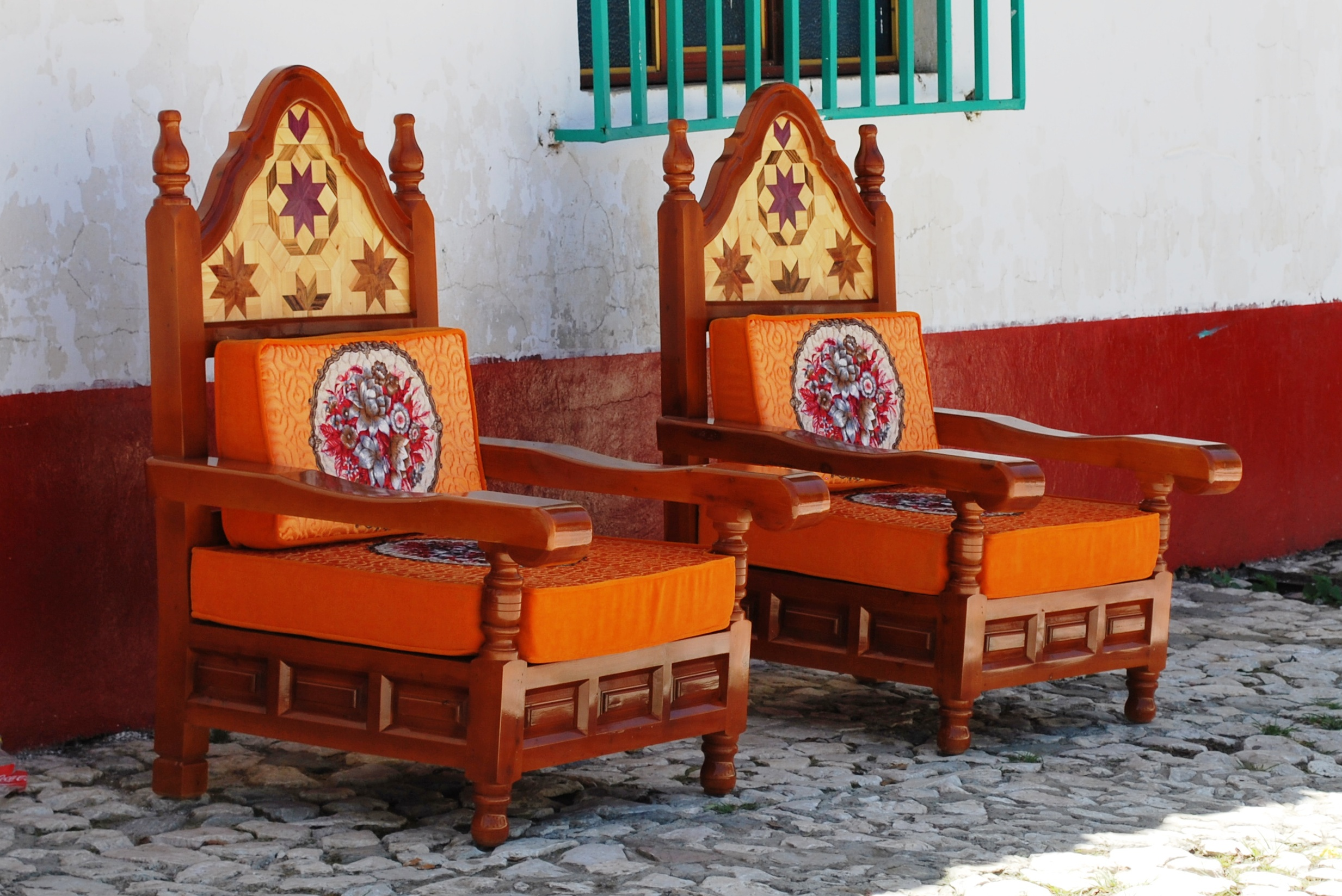
Wood parquet chairs for sale in Ixcateopan

Wood is used to make furniture, toys, houses, ships and paper.

Furniture for everyday use is commonly made throughout the state. In some areas, reproductions of rustic colonial furniture is made, such as in Taxco and Ixcateopan. Thiese pieces can include leather or palm frond components, and can include pieces made in finer woods such as cedar. In Venta Vieja, on the highway between Iguala and Chilpancingo, they make and sell living room and dining room sets, along with animal figures. Areas that made better-quality furniture in general include Chilpancingo, Iguala, Teloloapan and Ciudad Altamirano. In Teloloapan, Chilapa and Ayahualulco wooden masks and figures are also made, with lyres and various toy instruments made in Paraíso and Tetipac.

In the lacquerware producing communities such as Olinalá, local carpenters make the boxes, chests, bowls and other items to be lacquered.

=== Textiles ===
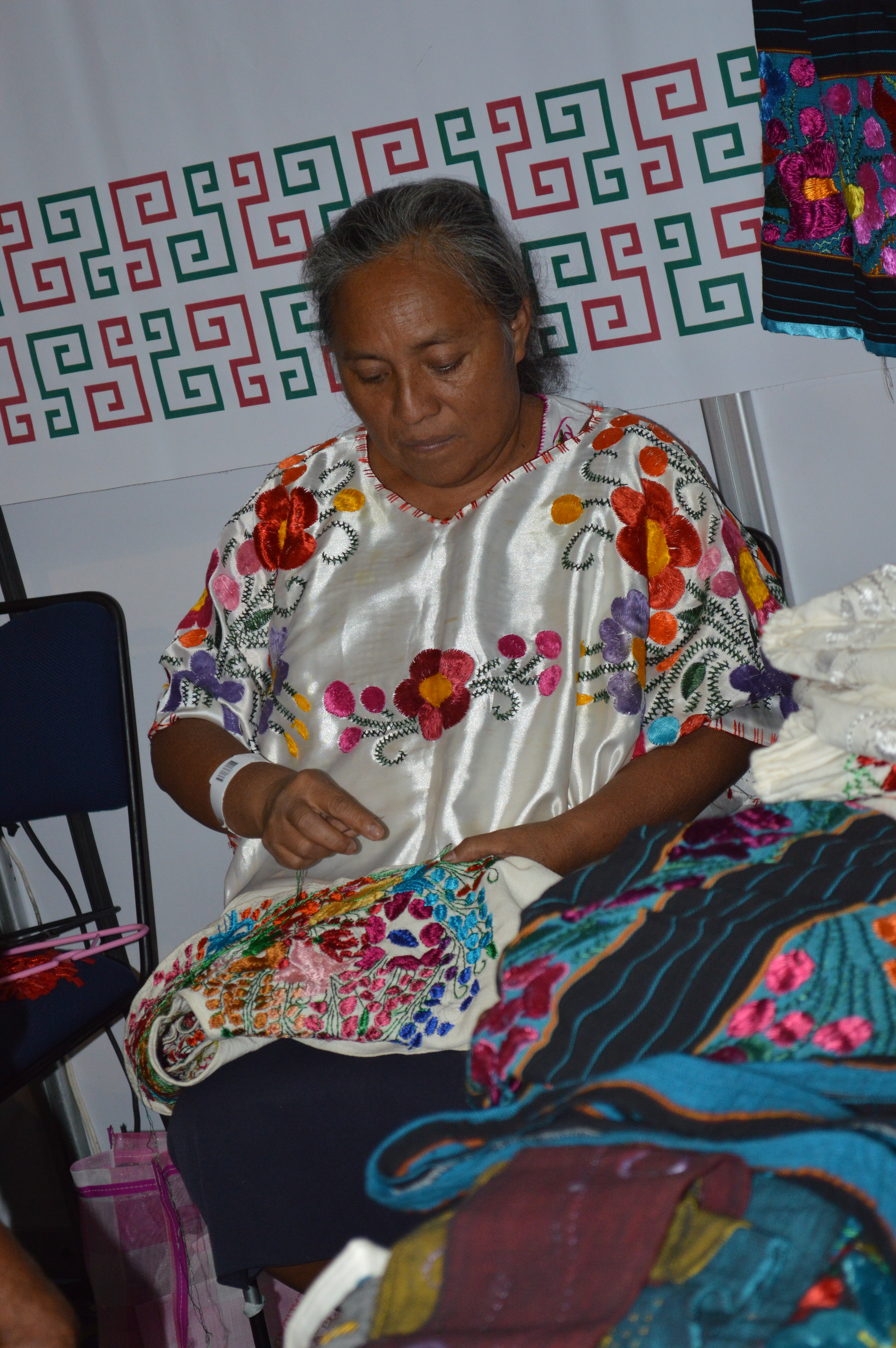
Woman from Chilapa de Alvarez embroidering a blouse

Textiles in the state are distinguished by the weaving and embroidery traditions of its indigenous peoples. The most distinctive of these is clothing items, but tablecloths, napkins and other wares are also made.

Many Mixtec, Amuzgo and Nahua women still wear traditional dress, often made with hand woven cloth, with the finished product hand-embroidered. The main communities for this activity include Tlacoachistlahuaca, Xochistlahuaca, Yoloxochily, Huahuetónoc and Acatlán (Chilapa municipality). Both weaving patterns and embroidery designs can be intricate and adorn items such as blouses, shirts, pants and robes. The most distinctive indigenous clothing garment is the huipil (a kind of loose blouse or dress), which is produced by several cultures, such as the Mixtec, Tlapanec and Amuzgo. Backstrap looms are used in Mixtec and Tlapaneca communities to make sarapes and gabanes (a kind of overcoat) which are somewhat crude, dyed with natural or commercial dyes in contrasting patterns. Another distinctive garment is the enredo nahuatl (a kind of wrap belt), made of cotton dyed blue with three white stripes, over which there is embroidery with floral, religious, patriotic human and animal motifs. The community best known for this work is Acatlán.

In Zitlala and Acatlán, women sew traditional dresses, blouses and skirts, all embroidered. In Ometepec they create white blouses embroidered with sequins, with designs depicting fantastic animals, vegetation, geometric patterns and even people. Rebozos are still woven in the state but are disappearing. Chilapa still makes some.

Another popular item made for tourists is clothing items, which while not authentic, do contain elements in cut or decoration from indigenous dress.

=== Other crafts ===
Precious and semi-precious stones are worked, often with pre Hispanic motifs in location such as Taxco, Chilpancingo, Ixcateopan and Buena Vista de Cuellar. Various kinds of jewelry are made in Acatlán and Chilapa in family workshops. One particular item is brooches in various colors and materials. Various types of jewelry is made with fine gold wire in Ciudad Altamirano.

Leatherworking is found in San Jerónimo (Costa Grande); Chilpancingo, Tixtla and Quechultenango in the center of the state; Arcelia and Coyuca de Catalán in the Tierra Caliente; and Buena Vista de Cuellar, whose work has won national competitions. Leather working in the state includes cattle, pig and goat hides to make shoes, jackets, coats, bags, holsters, belts, wallets and more.

Patricio Ocampo Giles of San Martin Pachivia uses animal skulls and some other bones to create a unique craft. Using those of farm animals such as cattle, sheep and goats as a base, he creates masks and other images of old men, witches, shamans and more by covering the base with clay. While there is influence from the pre Hispanic period, the works are purely decorative, not religious.

The coastal areas make a number of crafts, mostly as souvenirs for tourists. Many of these are made of seashells but with very limited artistry or quality. It is similar with items made with coconut shells, especially in Costa Grande region. However, there is one artisan, Gilberto Abarca Galeana, who has taken this work to a higher level, noted for creativity and craftsmanship, making masks, jewelry, tortilla holders, picture frames, key chains and more. Hammocks are made mostly in coastal communities such as Pénjamo, between Acapulco and Zihuatanejo, for both local and tourist sales.

== Notable artisans ==
- William Spratling
- Florentina López de Jesús
- Francisco Coronel Navarro
- Pablo Dolores Regino
