= Rodolfo Nieto =

Mexican painter (1936–1985)

- Born: Rodolfo Nieto Labastida; July 13, 1936; Oaxaca, Oaxaca
- Died: 24 June 1985 (aged 48); Mexico City
- Education: "La Esmeralda"
- Notable work: Man with Bottle
- Spouse: Nancy Glenn-Nieto
- Awards: Biennale de Paris 1963 for new artist and in 1967 for painting
- Patrons: Bernard Semiatisky

Rodolfo Nieto Labastida (July 13, 1936 in Oaxaca – June 24, 1985 in Mexico City) was a Mexican painter of the Oaxacan School (apprenticed under Diego Rivera, later served him as an assistant).

== Biography ==
Rodolfo Nieto was born at home in Oaxaca on July 13, 1936. His father Rodolfo Nieto Gris, a medical epidemiologist, left the home mysteriously around 1949. After his disappearance, the family became destitute; his mother, Josefina Labastida de Nieto, a homemaker and seamstress, moved to Mexico City with Rodolfo, his younger brother Carlos Nieto, a poet—who was later murdered due to his political associations—after Rodolfo died, formed a new family with half brother Ignacio Saucedo. While Rodolfo attended public school, the art professor and dancer Santos Balmori on behalf of the Mexican Government, interviewed students for the Mexican folklorico. After Rodolfo auditioned, Balmori asked the teenager if he could do anything else. Rodolfo sketched a cat. The professor was impressed and asked him if he would like to participate in painting the scenery for the folklorico. It was Balmori who encouraged Rodolfo to begin his studies in 1954 at the Escuela Nacional de Pintura, Escultura y Grabado "La Esmeralda", Mexico City, where he studied with Carlos Orozco Romero and met Juan Soriano, who introduced him to books on European painting. In 1959, he had his first solo exhibition at the Galerías San Carlos.

Desiring to broaden his artistic influences, Nieto moved to Paris in the early 1960s. Here he became friends with artists such as Julio Cortázar, Severo Toledo and José Bianco. He worked at the Atelier 17 with Stanley William Hayter and his discovery of the work of Edvard Munch spurred an interest in wood engraving. He also worked at the lithography workshop of Michael Casse for German publisher Manus Press. In Paris away from his indigenous environment, Nieto began to re-think folk art from his native Oaxaca mainly focusing on the brightly painted hand-carved wooden animals known as alebrijes. He combined the alebrijes with the Burne Hogarth’s Tarzan comic strip stories of his childhood.

Nieto wrote: “To Burne Hogarth I dedicate, in memory of the Tarzan stories of my childhood, the series of animals I drew while I was in Switzerland, likewise the xylographs I created in Munich and Paris.” Mentally Nieto took apart the structural aspect of the alebrijes and reconstructed them with the whimsy and wonderment of the Tarzan stories. This resulted not only in the Bestiario series of drawing and wood block prints, but established a style of painting that is now incorporated into the Oaxacan School. While in Paris, Nieto won the Biennale de Paris Prize for painting in 1963. He again won the Biennale de Paris Prize for painting in 1968. In 1966, Rodolfo Nieto illustrated “Manuel de zoologie fantastique” by Jorge Luis Borges. Nieto won the Bienal of Caen in 1970 and the Bienal de Menton. He returned to Mexico in 1972, stating that indigenous spirits called "nahuales" were calling him home.

In Europe Nieto had gained fame and recognition in the art world, but in Mexico he struggled despite an exhibition of his work at the Museo de Arte Moderno in 1973. A sensitive man, Nieto was crushed emotionally that the Mexican art critiques refused to consider his work seriously. He met his wife, Nancy Glenn-Nieto, a painter, at the grand opening of David Alfaro Siqueiros Polyforum Cultural Siqueiros in Mexico City. Nieto was invited to Siqueiros' home after the Polyforum event and asked Siqueiros if he could bring along his new friend. Siqueiros said, "Of course." But Nancy preferred to spend time alone with Nieto. Later Nancy regretted not attending Siqueiros' private party. Nancy and Nieto were wed a few months later. The new couple developed a deep connection with art, especially Nieto's new genre of Mexican art. However, Mexico was not ready for Nieto's art. “Because Mexico rejected his art, Rodolfo went into a deep depression.”

Rodolfo and Nancy pressed on. They painted together every day, from the morning until often late into the evening. Nancy helped Nieto stretch and gesso the canvases, sketch the major constructions lines and Nieto would finish the work. Together they created hundreds of paintings. With the frenzy of work, Nieto became exhausted and depressed. His sleeping was erratic, his mind began wondering, seeing things, speaking and acting unusual. He seemed to have an awareness of his life coming to an end. In the Mexican tradition of laughing at death with skull art he began to paint Calaveras (skulls) in the Nieto tradition of mentally taking apart the structural elements only to reassemble them in a different perception. His brief life ended on June 24, 1985. One of the last things he told Nancy was “Keep my paintings. Someday they will be very valuable.” Nancy Glenn-Nieto continues to paint in the Oaxacan style of Rodolfo Nieto.

In 1995, the Museo de Arte Contemporáneo de Monterrey held a tribute to the artist to reevaluate his work.

== Artistry ==
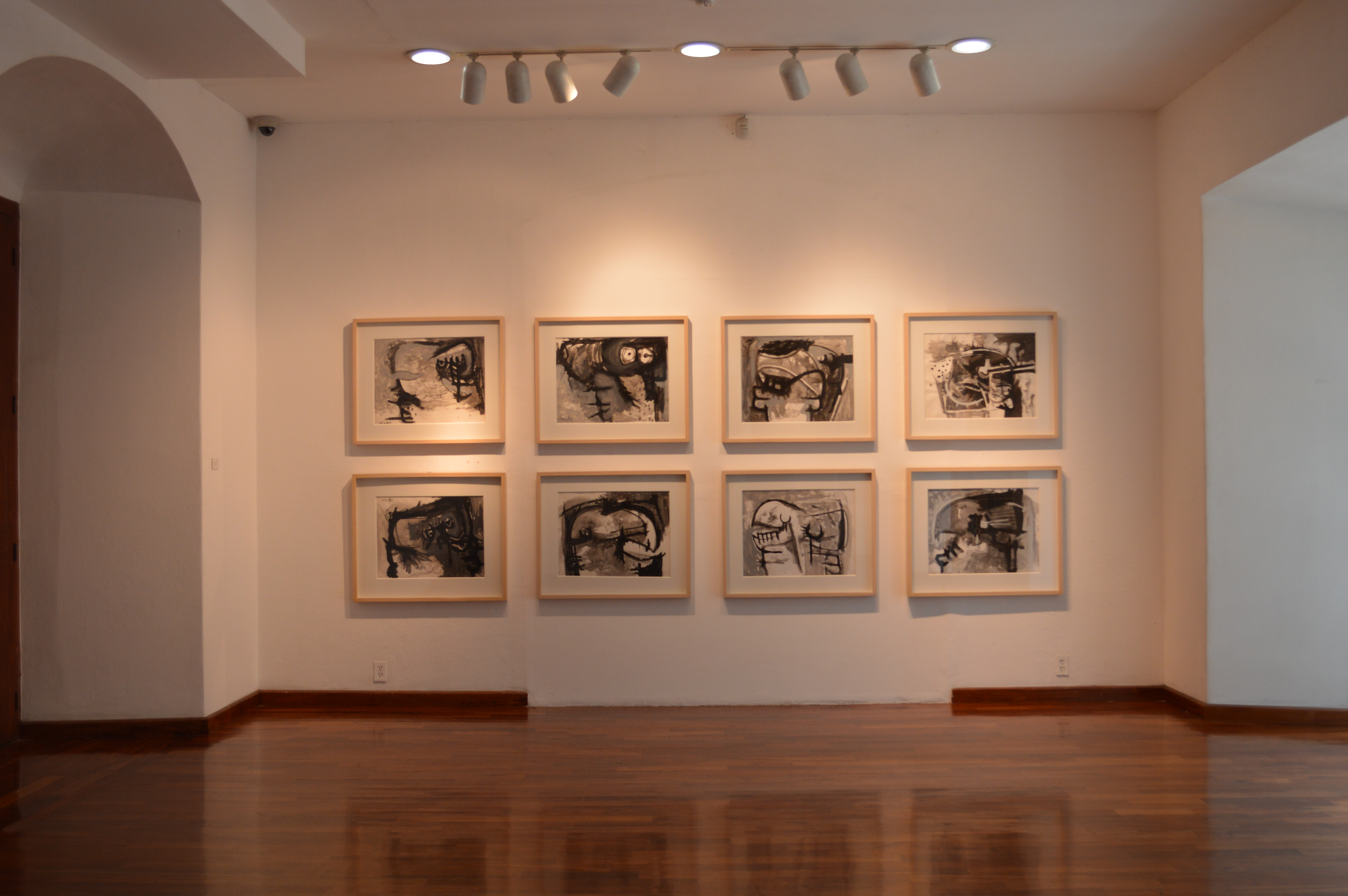
Exhibition Zoologico Mental at the Musoe de los Pintores Oaxaquenos

Fernando Gamboa stated that noise and melody, the human figure and graphic line, expression and invention, reality and fiction are all interwoven in Nieto's canvases: he was part of the Generación de la Ruptura and has been related to the School of Oaxaca, with works based on the myths and legends of the state. Nieto worked in diverse techniques such as pencil, pastel and oil to mixed media and graphics. His work is semi-abstract in the realm of magical realism. While his time in Europe was important for the development of his visual language, it remained based on the colors and images of his native state. After he returned to Mexico, he studied pre Hispanic and popular art which caused him to simplify forms. However, his most popular paintings are of Toros, or Bulls. At auction, these pieces sell in the mid-six figure range.

Often asked if he was an abstract painter. Nieto always defended himself from that idea, and did not understand how people could be confused, as he had never stopped doing figuration, but certainly not realistic. He told to his brother Carlos between laughs: "If I did abstract painting and would like to send a message, I'd better to have written a novel."

== Octavio Paz ==
According to Octavio Paz, "The interesting thing about him was seeking, restlessness, lack of satisfaction he felt with what he did, which is a symptom of undoubted talent. He was an intelligent man, a critically rare bird." Find the simplest elements and compose with them, in an almost a musical sense, seems to be the goal that guides the formation of its new characters ...
