= Santos Balmori =

Spanish-Mexican painter

Santos Balmori Picazo (b. Mexico City, Sept. 26, 1898 – d. Mexico City, March 5, 1992) was a Spanish-Mexican painter whose heavily European style was not appreciated by his contemporaries of the Mexican muralism movement, but he had influence with the succeeding Generación de la Ruptura artists. He trained and began his art career in Europe moving later to Mexico City. He became a professor and researcher at the Escuela Nacional de Artes Plásticas training younger artists such as Rodolfo Nieto, Pedro Coronel, Carlos Olachea and Juan Soriano. As a teacher, he did not stop drawing but he did not paint professionally again until after retirement, having a number of exhibitions later in life.

== Life ==
Balmori Picazo was born in Mexico City on September 26, 1899 to Ramón Balmori Galguerra from Asturias, Spain and Everarda Picazo from Mexico.

He spent his first four years of life in a community called Soberrón near Llanes, Asturias with his mother, Everanda Picazo de Cuevas, dying in Spain. The family then moved to Mendoza, Argentina. They then moved by mule across the Andes to live in Santiago de Chile. When he was sixteen, Balmori’s father, Ramón Balmori Galguera, committed suicide.

He entered the Escuela de Bellas Artes de Santiago but his guardians did not want him to study art. In 1919, he went to Europe to study, starting at the Academy of San Fernando in Spain. His teachers in San Fernando included José Moreno Carbonero, Joaquín Sorolla and Julio Romero de Torres and studied with Salvador Dalí and Remedios Varo. He was offered a chance to immigrate to Rome as a distinguished Spanish student but since the offer required that he renounce his Mexican citizenship, he declined. The Academy of San Fernando believed that the ideal was to reproduce reality without distortions but Balmori rebelled against this idea. For this reason, he gave up studies here for Paris at age twenty two. He lived for the next fourteen years in Paris, at first studying at the Académie de la Grande Chaumière under sculptor Antoine Bourdelle and learning about new movements in art. He struggled economically, but also met a number of famous artists, studying the work of Picasso, Amedeo Modigliani, Georges Braque and Matisse along with those of Italian Futurists and German Expressionists. He also had his first professional success as an artist.

He studied transcendental meditation and because of health problems, spent time in Oran, North Africa.

He favored the Republicans during the Spanish Civil War, which led to his detention in Spain. After he returned to Mexico, he continued this support, opening a school for children of Spanish exiles.

Balmori Picazo was married three times, all to dancers. His first wife was French dancer, Marie Thérèse Bénard, who died shortly after from Addison's disease. His second wife was Rachel Björnstrom, which whom he had a daughter, Kore Monica, who fell ill with polio. Rachel took the child to Sweden and never returned. His last marriage was to Helena Jordán Juárez and lasted over forty years until his death.

He died at age 93 in Mexico City on March 5, 1992 from heart and respiratory failure.

== Career ==
Balmori Picazo began his career in Paris, where he met Juan Gris, Maurice de Vlaminck, Tsuguharu Foujita, Rabindranath Tagore and Mahatma Gandhi, doing a portrait of Gandhi. He collaborated with Henri Barbusse on the weekly Monde, illustrating texts by writers such as Miguel de Unamuno, Maxim Gorki, Albert Einstein and Upton Sinclair. He also designed textiles, flyers and created engravings and paintings as well as posters against fascism, which earned him international awards. However, his anti-fascist activism along with collaboration with Federico García Lorca, Unamuno and León Felipe got him into trouble with the Spanish government.

His first exhibitions were also in Europe, first at the Duncan Gallery in Paris. He traveled to Sweden for various successful exhibitions, then to Brussels and Madrid before he returned to Mexico, exhibiting in Mexico City. During the 1930s, he was a member of leftist artists' organization Liga de Escritores y Artistas Revolucionarios and produced many illustrations for Luz, the magazine of the national electricians' union.

However, Mexico from the 1930s to 1950s was highly nationalistic with the painters from the Mexican muralism movement dominating, making Balmori’s more international style less appealing. He became a professor for about thirty years at the Escuela Nacional de Artes Plásticas and was also the head of the Academia de la Danza Mexicana with Miguel Covarrubias. During this time (1950s) he actively promoted new dance movements in Mexico, including the production of posters, wardrobes and librettos. His art students included Rodolfo Nieto, Pedro Coronel, Carlos Olachea and Juan Soriano. He was also an important fine arts researcher and writer, publishing articles books and essays on the topic as well as poetry. Two books, Aurea Mesura and Técnica de la expression plástica, were published by UNAM.

In his later career, he taught drawing, painting and composition at La Esmeralda and at the Escuela Nacional de Artes Plásticas, both in Mexico City.In 1973, he held an exhibition called "Espacios y tensiones" at the Museo Tecnológico de la Comisión Federal de Electricidad. This consisted of a series of paintings that demonstrated yet new ideas in his artistic conceptions. This and the later "Lunar Route" exhibitions were among his most important shows.

Although he never stopped drawing, he returned to painting professionally after he retired from teaching at age seventy, exhibiting several times. His drawings include those of dancers such as Raquel Gutierrez, Rosa Reina and his wife Helena, as well as sketches of the Ballet Antigona which was headed by José Limón. His work can be found at the Museo de Arte Moderno in Toluca, the Museo de Universitario de Artes y Ciencias at UNAM, the Museo de la Estampa, the Museo de Arte Moderno in Madrid, the National Gallery in Prague and the Museum of Fine Arts of Asturias .

When he was ninety, the Palacio de Bellas Artes held a homage for him along with the Museum of Fine Arts of Asturias in Oviedo, Spain, both with large retrospectives of his work. Other retrospectives of his work have been held after his death such as the 1996 event at the Casa Lamm Cultural Center in Mexico City and the Mexican Cultural Center in Paris in 1998.

== Artistry ==
Balmori’s painting varied among the various painting styles of Europe of the 20th century as well as influence from Mexican muralism. While studying in Madrid, observing copies of Greek, Roman and Egyptian statues, he declared that beyond all forms there is a universe of light and shadow, whose mysteries, he stated, were for painters to discover. His portraits of Gandhi show academic and classical influence with some distortion of form and geometric shapes showing influence from Cubism and Picasso. Influence from Mexican muralism can be seen in realistic images and figurativism. Balmori was not influential directly in Mexican art as when he returned to Mexico in the 1930s, his European influence work was not popular. His work was not recognized by his contemporaries, with the exception of Carlos Mérida, but did have influence on the following Generación de la Ruptura.
