= Acalmani, Igualapa =

Acalmani
- town
- Location in Mexico
- Coordinates: 16°48′58″N 98°30′20″W
- Country: Mexico
- State: Guerrero
- Municipality: Igualapa
- Elevation: 350 m (1,150 ft)

Population (2005)
  - Total: 728

Acalmani is a town in the municipality of Igualapa, Guerrero, Mexico. It is situated at an elevation of 350 meters, and has a population of 728.

== Population ==
The population of 728 consists of 368 males and 360 females. There are 293 adults, of which 34 are older than 60 years of age. The remaining 435 inhabitants are children.

The indigenous population is 299, of which 89 people speak indigenous languages.

== Housing ==
There are 133 homes, of which 23 are single-family homes, 31 have indoor plumbing, one is connected to public utilities, and 115 have electric lighting. Of the 133 homes, one has a computer, three have a washing machine, and 60 have a television.

== Education ==
Of the children between 6 and 14 years of age, 9 do not attend school. Of those 15 and older, 97 never attended school, 142 had not completed schooling, 53 finished basic school, and 61 had advanced education (such as high school). There are 91 illiterate people 15 and over in Acalmani. For those between 15 and 24 years of age, the median level of school attendance is 5 years.
