= Skull art =

Use of skulls and skeletons in art

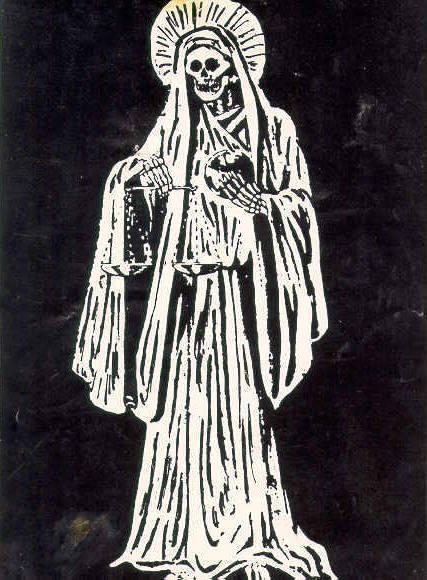
Santa Muerte seen holding a scale and globe

Skull art is found in various cultures of the world.

Indigenous Mexican art celebrates the skeleton and uses it as a regular motif. The use of skulls and skeletons in art originated before the Conquest: The Aztecs excelled in stone sculptures and created striking carvings of their Gods. Coatlicue, the Goddess of earth and death, was portrayed with a necklace of human hearts, hands and a skull pendant. She was imbued with the drama and grandeur necessary to dazzle the subject people and to convey the image of an implacable state. The worship of death involved worship of life, while the skull – symbol of death – was a promise to resurrection. The Aztecs carved skulls in monoliths of lava, and made masks of obsidian and jade. Furthermore, the skull motif was used in decoration. They were molded on pots, traced on scrolls, woven into garments, and formalized into hieroglyphs. Hindu temples and depiction of some Hindu deities have displayed skull art.

== Spanish invasion ==
When the Spanish invaded and conquered Tenochtitlan in the sixteenth century, they imposed the Catholic religion and Spanish folk-practices of the era. This included the pagan tradition of celebrating the dead with food-offerings and feasts. However, the Spanish priests were eager to discontinue these ancient traditions that found fertile ground in Mexico. The Spanish suppressed the Mexican skull art tradition because it was too Indito or pagan for their European tastes. Not until Mexico won its independence from Spain in 1821, did skull art begin to re-emerge as a symbol of Mexicanidad.

== Hindu art ==
Skull art is found in depictions of some Hindu Gods. Lord Shiva has been depicted as carrying skull. Goddess Chamunda is described as wearing a garland of severed heads or skulls (Mundamala). Kedareshwara Temple, Hoysaleswara Temple, Chennakeshava Temple, Lakshminarayana Temple are some of the Hindu temples that include sculptures of skulls and Goddess Chamunda. The temple of Kali is veneered with skulls.

== Regime of Porfirio Díaz ==
When Porfirio Díaz became president, Mexico was burdened with a bankrupt economy. To help the economic situation, Díaz encouraged foreign investments, and investors found a cheap labor force. The Mexican–Indian laborer worked under cruel conditions. Mexican engraver José Guadalupe Posada with his drawing criticized the conditions in Mexico. Posada is probably the most important Mexican artist of our times. During his lifetime, he was a witness to the crucial social and political changes which shaped Mexico into a modern nation, such as the downfall of a dictator, widespread social revolution, and the struggle for power combined with the birth of a democratic process, all of which deeply influenced him. Through his work, he documented these occurrences and became a pictorial historian.

== José Guadalupe Posada ==
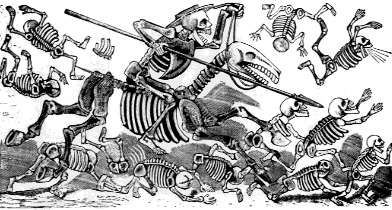
Posada's Skull art was a chilling message

Posada's drawings brought an awakening to the common man. He made those who could not read to understand what was happening in their country. Although the use of skulls and skeletons in art had been suppressed by foreign influences, it was still recognized among the poor in their celebrations of the Day of the Dead. Using skull art was Posada's way to make a connection with the popular audience. Reproduced on box lids is his most famous engraving – la Calavera Catrina – which shows a fashionable lady in the guise of a skeleton. Diego Rivera called José Guadalupe Posada the greatest Mexican people's artist. From this influence, Rivera painted common people living and working in their environment. His work also carried a social message.

Posada and Rivera deeply influenced the Jaliscano Jorge González Camarena, who disregarded the traditional methods and embraced the popular art of Posada and Rivera. Recurring battle scenes appear in González Camarena's work where Revolutionary soldiers become part of the ancient Mexican history as their lifeless bodies change into skeletons.

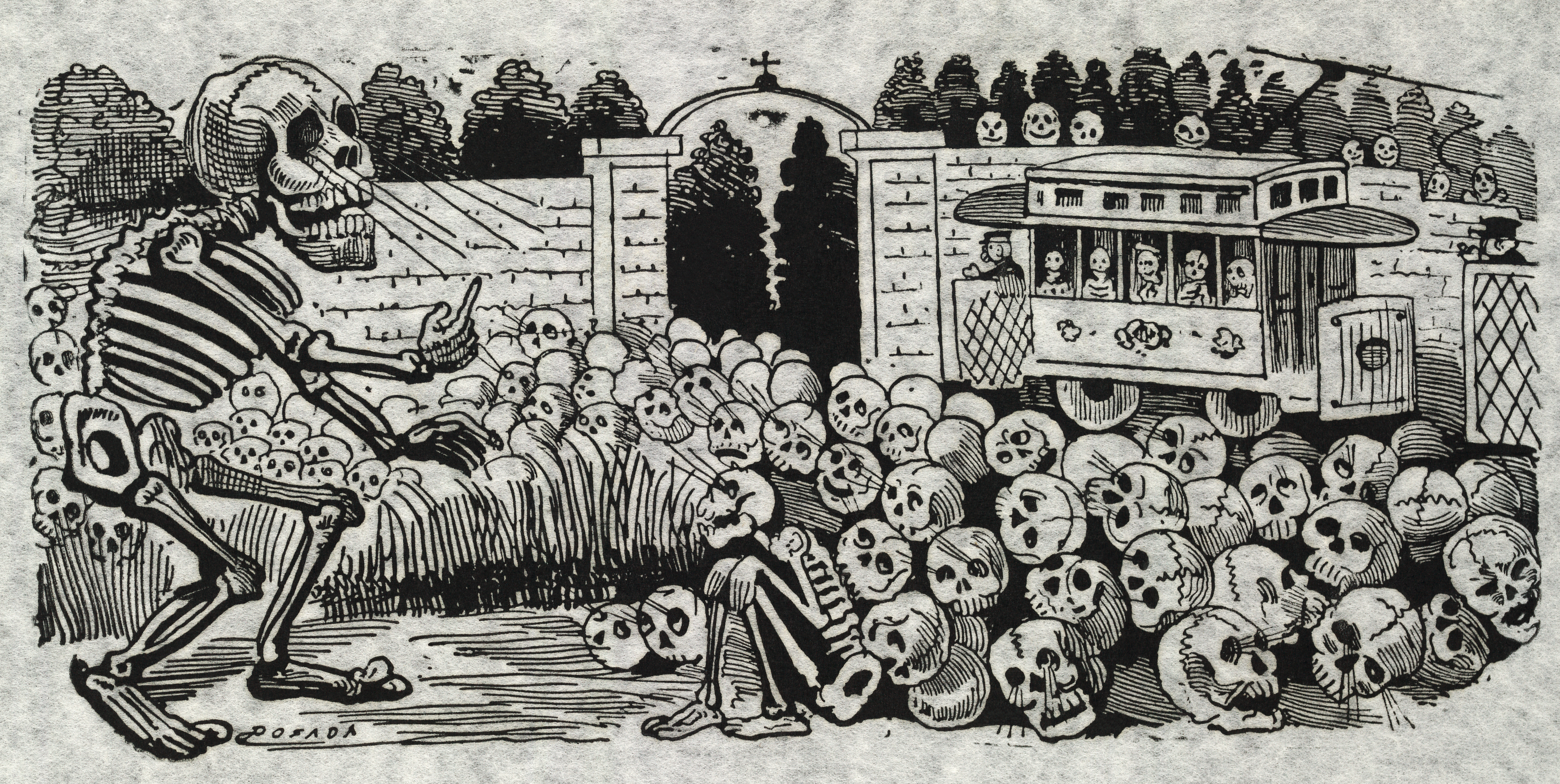
José Guadalupe Posada's version of Skull art used as a political message to those who did not know how to read.

== Frida Kahlo ==
Frida Kahlo was also the product of a bold and brilliant generation that looked back with devotion to its Mexican roots and valued the reality it found there, uncontaminated by foreign influence. She admitted having a great deal of admiration for her husband's work, as well as that of Jose Guadalupe Posada and she found great beauty in the highly developed pre-Conquest indigenous art.

== Surrealists ==
Frida was claimed early on by André Breton and the Surrealists as one of their own, and for a time she did not mind to be caught up and identified with the chic vanguard movement. But, later she declared herself not one of them because she said "I painted dreams, I painted my own reality." In the 1940s she painted "The Dream," where a conscious skeleton floats above the sleeping Frida. The Mexican brujos say "to live is to sleep and to die is to awaken." For Frida, perhaps, death like dreams exists in parallel.

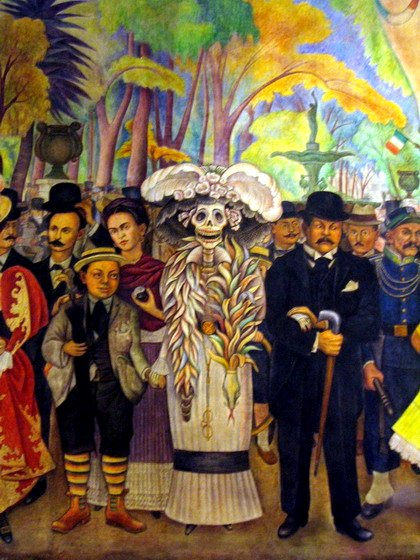
Diego Rivera's Skull art expression

== Chucho Reyes ==
While Frida's work focused on Mexicanidad, Chucho Reyes integrated European fine art styles with the essence of the popular Mexican skull art. Perhaps his art was politically unpopular for those who chose to disregard foreign influences. However, Reyes's unconventional combination was most likely influenced by his eccentric father who, although devoutly Catholic, practiced brujeria. He slept in a bed where roosters were tied to each bedpost and a large eye was painted above his bed on the ceiling.

== Superstitions and saints ==
Although modernly the ancient Aztec religious traditions that have remained are called brujeria by those who practice European religions, in Oaxaca – superstitions and saints are spoken in the same breath.

== Rufino Tamayo and the Oaxacan School ==
Rufino Tamayo founded the Oaxacan school of painting on the principle that although painting must take place on the plastic level, it does not exclude the possibility that the work contain a profound consequence not altogether expressed. Tamayo seemed to strip away man's external self, found for instance in religion, in order to examine man's fundamental fears. His fear of nature, of the cosmos, and above everything else, man's fear of himself. The subtle and rich art of pre-Columbian times greatly inspired Tamayo. From this influence he painted man as a transparent flesh existing on a living skeleton.

== Francisco Toledo ==
On the other hand, Francisco Toledo painted his subjects as if they were x-rays. Salacious curiosity with the inner being becomes almost pornographic as his erotic and irreverent resurgence of Skull Art comes forward.

== Rodolfo Nieto ==
While Rufino Tamayo founded the Oaxacan School, it was Rodolfo Nieto who defined it. Rodolfo added a dramatic tone to skull art. Using light colors fixed against dark hues, he showed the continual battle of life and death. With gaiety, humor, whimsies, and boyhood stories of Tarzan the Ape Man fighting the perils of the jungle, Rodolfo laughed at death while living in the shadows of his own deepening depression. Flashes of light confused by color, juxtaposed against the stark black canvasses, he did not attempt to define human existence, but just to live it, knowing that the skull was always within him. His painter wife Nancy Nieto removed the fleshy mask of life in order to examine the basis of life, the skull and skeleton.....

== Chicano / Mexican – American ==
Often Chicano or Mexican American artists turn to their history, recently and notably Nancy Nieto brings a bold resurgence to the ancient tradition of Mexican skull art. Woven into a veil of rich colors and unconventional forms, adopted from the Oaxacan School, her work removes the veil of the mystery of life only to reveal the mystery of death. She shows depths of mystery yet has a harmonious eurhythmic note of the epic origins of the chromatic Oaxaca. She struggles to re-address Francisco Toledo's erotic themes, and to step away from Rodolfo Nieto's dramatic tomes. Her work renews the Aztec view of death as a transitional cycle between the individual life and the ubiquitous "to be".

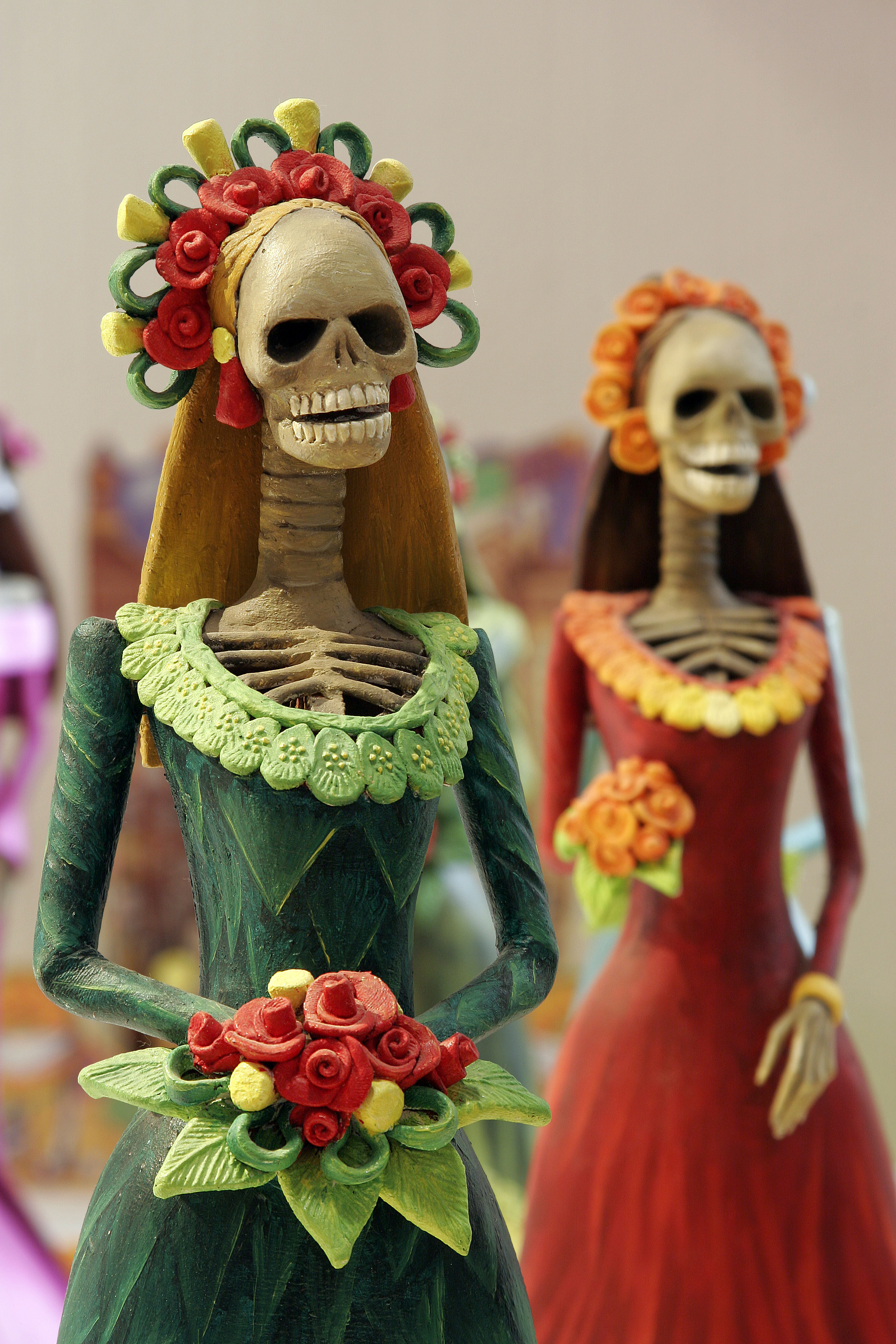
Skull women
