= Acalmani, Ayutla de los Libres =

Acalmani
- town
- Location in Mexico
- Coordinates: 17°05′17″N 99°06′59″W
- Country: Mexico
- State: Guerrero
- Municipality: Ayutla de los Libres
- Elevation: 930 m (3,050 ft)

Population (2010)
  - Total: 940
- Area code: 745

Acalmani is a town in the municipality of Ayutla de los Libres, Guerrero, Mexico. It is situated at an elevation of 930 meters, and as of 2010 had a population of 940, down from 1,011.

== Climate ==
Climate data for Ayutla de los Libres (1951–2010)
Month	Jan	Feb	Mar	Apr	May	Jun	Jul	Aug	Sep	Oct	Nov	Dec	Year
Record high °C (°F)	41.0 (105.8)	40.0 (104.0)	40.0 (104.0)	41.0 (105.8)	40.0 (104.0)	40.0 (104.0)	38.0 (100.4)	38.5 (101.3)	39.0 (102.2)	38.0 (100.4)	39.0 (102.2)	39.0 (102.2)	41.0 (105.8)
Mean daily maximum °C (°F)	31.7 (89.1)	32.3 (90.1)	33.0 (91.4)	33.8 (92.8)	33.9 (93.0)	31.9 (89.4)	31.0 (87.8)	31.0 (87.8)	30.0 (86.0)	30.5 (86.9)	31.2 (88.2)	31.3 (88.3)	31.8 (89.2)
Daily mean °C (°F)	24.8 (76.6)	25.1 (77.2)	25.7 (78.3)	26.7 (80.1)	27.3 (81.1)	26.5 (79.7)	26.0 (78.8)	25.9 (78.6)	25.4 (77.7)	25.5 (77.9)	25.2 (77.4)	24.9 (76.8)	25.8 (78.4)
Mean daily minimum °C (°F)	18.0 (64.4)	17.9 (64.2)	18.4 (65.1)	19.6 (67.3)	20.7 (69.3)	21.0 (69.8)	20.9 (69.6)	20.9 (69.6)	20.8 (69.4)	20.6 (69.1)	19.3 (66.7)	18.5 (65.3)	19.7 (67.5)
Record low °C (°F)	9.0 (48.2)	9.0 (48.2)	9.0 (48.2)	10.0 (50.0)	10.0 (50.0)	10.0 (50.0)	11.0 (51.8)	11.5 (52.7)	11.0 (51.8)	10.0 (50.0)	9.5 (49.1)	11.0 (51.8)	9.0 (48.2)
Average precipitation mm (inches)	12.8 (0.50)	6.4 (0.25)	4.6 (0.18)	3.4 (0.13)	40.7 (1.60)	318.7 (12.55)	332.3 (13.08)	350.7 (13.81)	451.6 (17.78)	186.9 (7.36)	37.9 (1.49)	8.1 (0.32)	1,754.1 (69.06)
Average precipitation days (≥ 0.1 mm)	1.0	0.4	0.3	0.4	3.5	15.4	18.7	19.6	20.9	11.9	2.5	0.8	95.4
Source: Servicio Meteorologico Nacional

== Population ==
As of 2005, the population of 1,011 consisted of 513 males and 498 females. There were 356 adults, of which 41 were older than 60 years of age. The remaining 655 inhabitants were children.

The indigenous population was 57, of which 21 people spoke indigenous languages, and one of those did not speak Spanish. The Ethnologue reports that the village's indigenous language is Acatepec Me’phaa.

== Housing ==
There are 137 homes, of which 9 are single-family homes, 10 have indoor plumbing, none are connected to public utilities, and 125 have electric lighting. Of the 137 homes, none have a computer, none a washing machine, but 58 have a television.

== Education ==
Of the children between 6 and 14 years of age, 19 do not attend school. Of those 15 and older, 84 never attended school, 250 had not completed schooling, 84 finished basic school, and 7 had advanced education (such as high school). There are 117 illiterate people 15 and over in Acalmani. For those between 15 and 24 years of age, the median level of school attendance is 5 years.
