= Hacienda Santa Clara =

Hacienda Santa Clara Study and Research Center
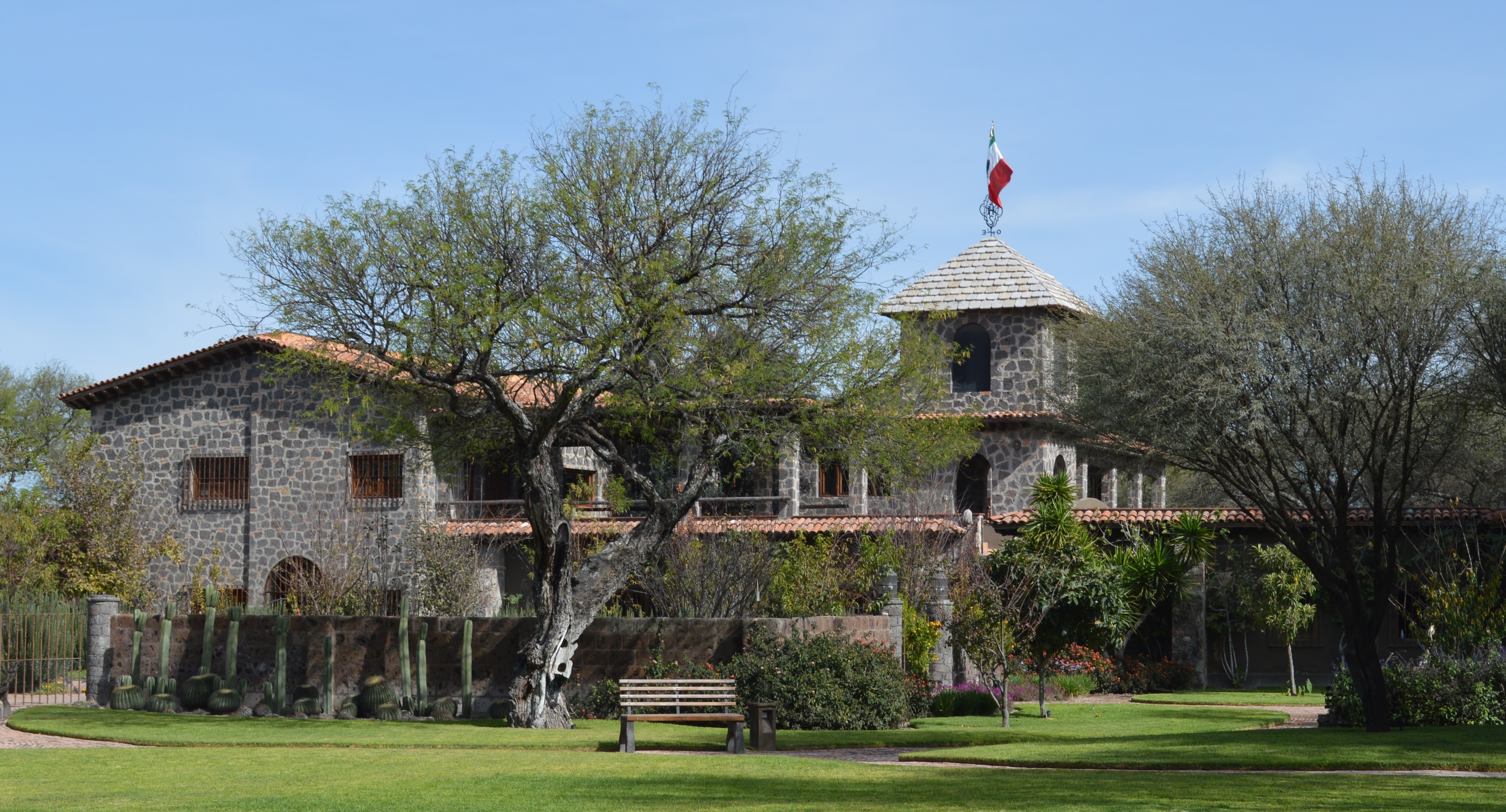
- Main house of the campus

Location
- San Miguel de Allende; Mexico
- Coordinates: 21°5′15.98″N 100°36′34.08″W

Information
- Established: 23 September 2015
- Grades: university
- Website: haciendastaclara.com

The Hacienda Santa Clara is a study abroad and research center located in San Miguel Allende, Guanajuato, Mexico. It is on a former maguey hacienda in central Mexico, which was reconstructed for the center in the 2010s, to support study abroad students and researchers, primarily from the United States.

== Site ==
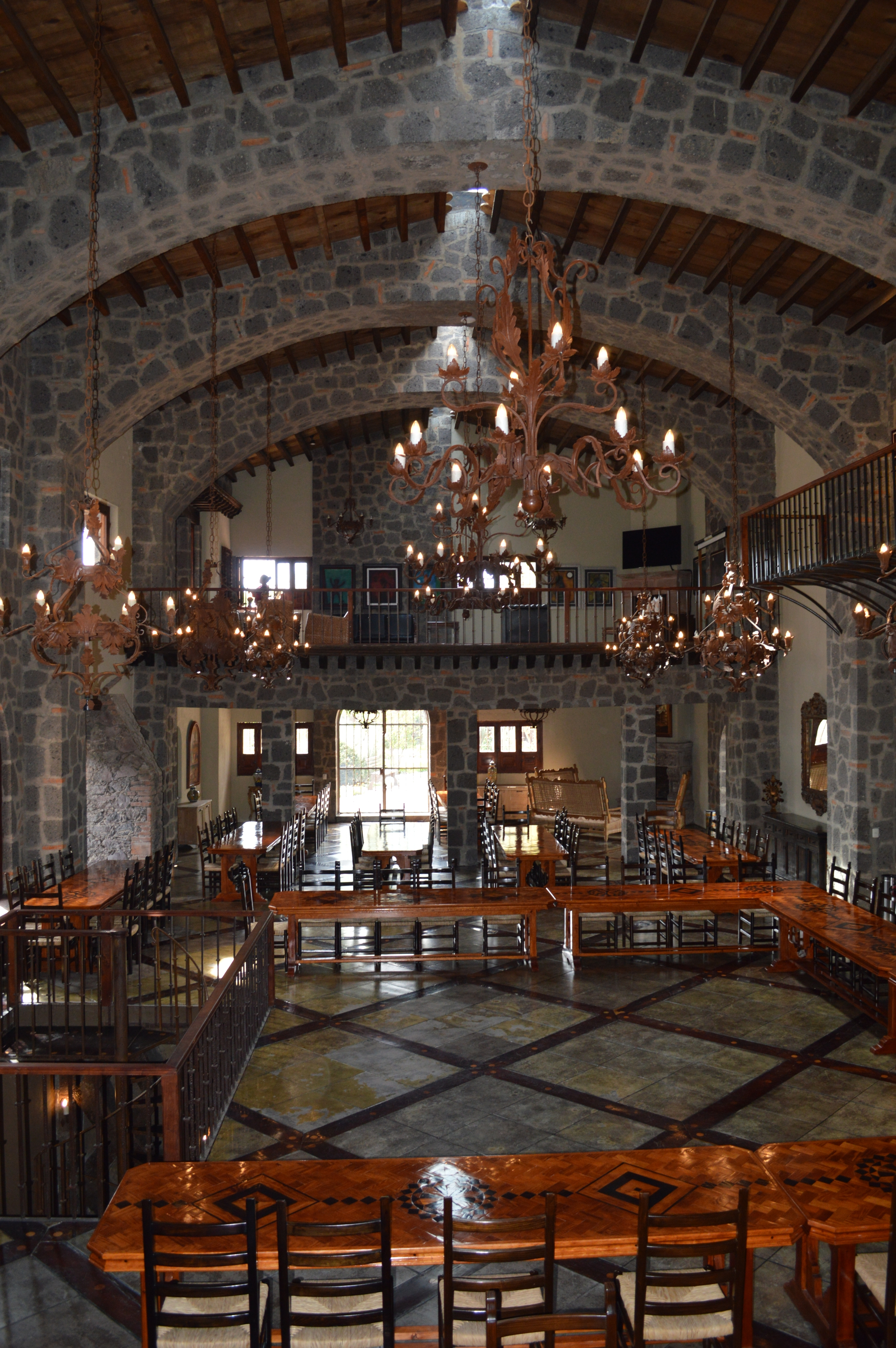
View of the dining room of the main house

The site is a 340-acre former maguey producing hacienda located in the municipality of San Miguel de Allende, about 40 minutes outside of the city proper.

There are three main buildings, a main house, a chapel and dormitories. The main house holds a large dining facility, class and meeting rooms, library, a game room/bar and more. The chapel has the layout of a traditional hacienda chapel but is much larger, with space to hold assemblies of up to 300 people. The dormitories are off to the side of these buildings and house up to 500 students.

The buildings and furnishings were constructed or restored on site using mostly local materials and craftsmen. These buildings are surrounded by patios and gardens aligned with the native flora of the area, and containing about 1.7 million bricks.

== Function ==
The facility was built to accommodate students and researchers from abroad, especially from the United States and is currently operated by a trust set up for that purpose. For students, the idea is to foster an international perspective. The center’s main partner is Texas A&M University, but also has partnerships with the University of Guanajuato and the Instituto Tecnológico Sanmiguelense.

The property is not generally open to the public, but events have been held here.

== History ==
The original hacienda was established in the 1850s, but by the 2010s, it was in ruins. The property was selected by Pablo and Barbara Marvin with the purpose of founding the center, one of various centers of this type created by the Marvins. The site was chosen because of San Miguel’s status as a UNESCO Heritage Site (2008), as well as its over 130 arts and handcrafts galleries, along with numerous restaurants, cafes and other tourist infrastructure.

The overall design of the site was created by Hollywood set designer Theresa Walker. It officially opened in October 2015, with the name Hacienda Santa Clara Study and Research Center, but began receiving students in October 2014.
