= Ayutla de los Libres (municipality) =

Municipality in the Mexican state of Guerrero

- Municipality
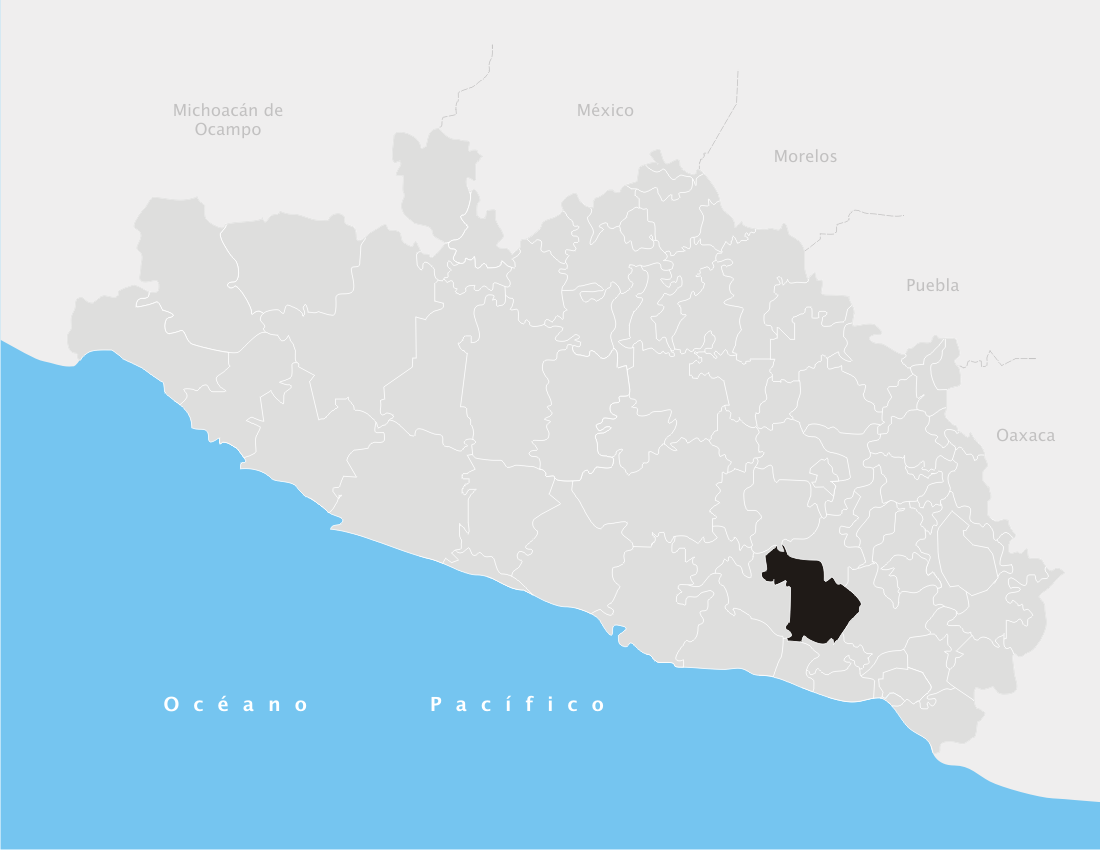
- Municipality of Ayutla de los Libres in Guerrero

- Location in Mexico
- Coordinates: 16°46′N 98°56′W
- Country: Mexico
- State: Guerrero
- Municipal seat: Ayutla de los Libres

Area
  - Total: 735.4 km^{2} (283.9 sq mi)

Population (2010)
  - Total: 60,690

Ayutla de los Libres (Mixtec: Tatioo) is a municipality in the Mexican state of Guerrero. The municipal seat lies at Ayutla de los Libres. The municipality covers an area of 735.4 km^{2}.

As of 2010, the municipality had a total population of 60,690, up from 55,954 as of 2005.

== Name ==
The name "Ayutla" comes from Nahuatl Ayotlan meaning "near the (place of abundance of) tortoises/turtles". The sobriquet "de los Libres" ("of the Free") was added after 1854, because the town was the place where the Ayutla Revolution started on March 1, 1854, and where the Ayutla Plan was announced.

== Towns ==
- Acalmani (Ayutla de los Libres), Guerrero
- Ayutla de los Libres
- Colotepec
