= Jalapa, Guerrero =

Jalapa is a small town in the Mexican state of Guerrero. It is located near the Pacific Ocean coast, on Federal Highway 200 some 45 km east of San Marcos.
