= 7th federal electoral district of Guerrero =

Federal electoral district of Mexico

Guerrero's 7th
- Electoral district of the Chamber of Deputies of Mexico

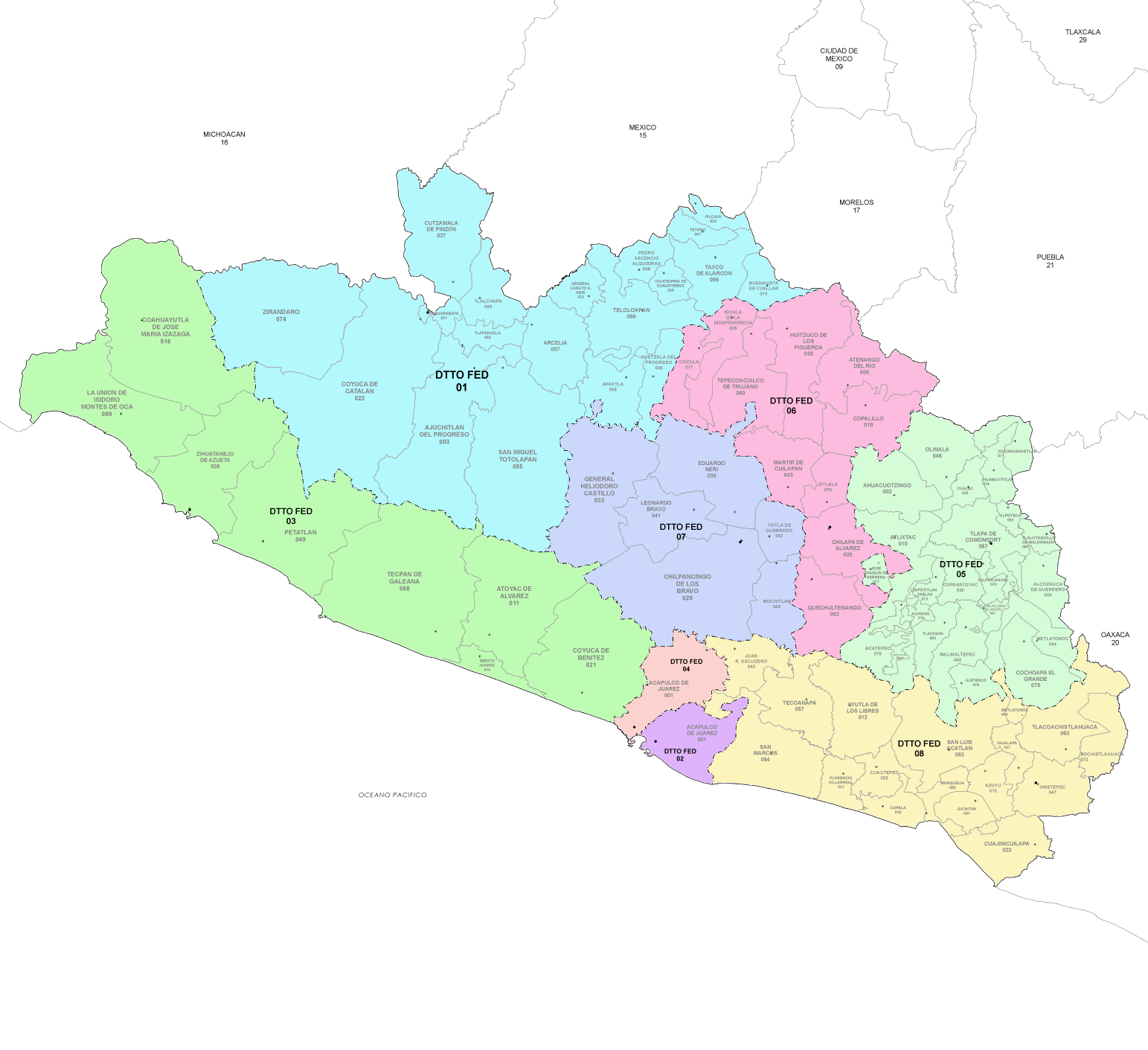
- 7th district since 2022

Incumbent
- Member: Carlos Sánchez Barrios
- Party: ▌Morena
- Congress: 66th (2024–2027)

District
- State: Guerrero
- Head town: Chilpancingo
- Coordinates: 17°33′N 99°30′W
- Covers: Chilpancingo de los Bravo, Eduardo Neri, General Heliodoro Castillo, Leonardo Bravo, Mochitlán, Tixtla de Guerrero
- PR region: Fourth
- Precincts: 249
- Population: 455,602 (2020 census)

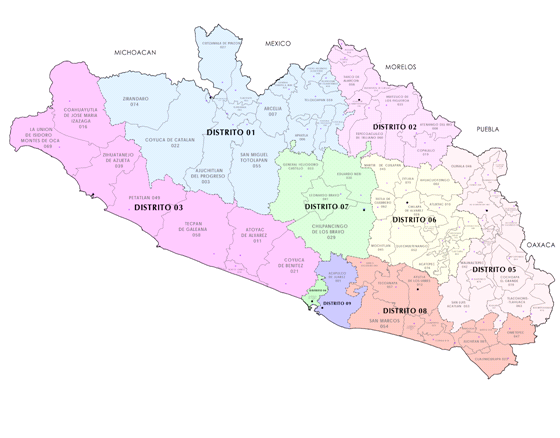
Guerrero under the 2017–2022 districting plan

The 7th federal electoral district of Guerrero (Spanish: Distrito electoral federal 07 de Guerrero) is one of the 300 electoral districts into which Mexico is divided for elections to the federal Chamber of Deputies and one of eight such districts in the state of Guerrero.

It elects one deputy to the lower house of Congress for each three-year legislative period by means of the first-past-the-post system. Votes cast in the district also count towards the calculation of proportional representation ("plurinominal") deputies elected from the fourth region.

The current member for the district, elected in the 2024 general election, is Carlos Sánchez Barrios of the National Regeneration Movement (Morena).

== District territory ==
Guerrero lost a congressional seat in the 2023 redistricting process carried out by the National Electoral Institute (INE). Under the new districting plan, which is to be used for the 2024, 2027 and 2030 federal elections, the 7th district covers 249 electoral precincts (secciones electorales) across six municipalities in the central part of the state:

- Chilpancingo de los Bravo, Eduardo Neri, General Heliodoro Castillo, Leonardo Bravo, Mochitlán and Tixtla de Guerrero.

The district's head town (cabecera distrital), where results from individual polling stations are gathered together and tallied, is the state capital, the city of Chilpancingo. The district reported a population of 455,602 in the 2020 census.

== Previous districting schemes ==
Evolution of electoral district numbers
	1974	1978	1996	2005	2017	2023
Guerrero	6	10	10	9	9	8
Chamber of Deputies	196	300				

Because of shifting population patterns, Guerrero currently has two fewer districts than the ten the state was assigned under the 1977 electoral reforms that set the national total at 300.

2017–2022

Between 2017 and 2022, Guerrero was allocated nine electoral districts. The 7th district had its head town at Chilpancingo and it comprised four municipalities:
- Chilpancingo de los Bravo, Eduardo Neri, General Heliodoro Castillo and Leonardo Bravo.

2005–2017

The 2005 districting plan assigned Guerrero nine districts. The 7th district's head town was at Chilpancingo and it covered five municipalities:
- Chilpancingo de los Bravo, Coyuca de Benítez, Mochitlán, Quechultenango and Tixtla de Guerrero.

1996–2005

Under the 1996 districting plan, which allocated Guerrero ten districts, the 7th district had its head town at Chilpancingo and it covered five municipalities:
- Chilpancingo de los Bravo, Coyuca de Benítez, Juan R. Escudero, Leonardo Bravo and Tecoanapa.

1978–1996

The districting scheme in force from 1978 to 1996 was the result of the 1977 electoral reforms, which increased the number of single-member seats in the Chamber of Deputies from 196 to 300. Under that plan, Guerrero's district allocation rose from six to ten. The newly restored 7th district's head town was at Acapulco and it covered a part of that city and the rural portion of its surrounding municipality. (Note: Under the 1978 plan, Chilpancingo was the head town of the first district.)

== Deputies returned to Congress ==
(Mexico) National parties
- Current
- PAN
- PRI
- PT
- PVEM
- MC
- Morena
- PAZ
- Somos
- Defunct or local only
- PLM
- PNR
- PRM
- PNM
- PP
- PPS
- PARM
- PFCRN
- CON
- PANAL
- PSD
- PES
- PES
- PRD

Guerrero's 7th district
Election	Deputy	Party	Term	Legislature
The seventh district was suspended between 1930 and 1979
1979	Jorge Montúfar Araujo	Institutional Revolutionary Party	1979–1982	51st Congress
1982	Eloy Polanco Salinas	Institutional Revolutionary Party	1982–1985	52nd Congress
1985	Félix Liera Ortiz	Institutional Revolutionary Party	1985–1988	53rd Congress
1988	Pablo Ávalos Castro	Authentic Party of the Mexican Revolution	1988–1991	54th Congress
1991	Nabor Ojeda Delgado	Institutional Revolutionary Party	1991–1994	55th Congress
1994	René Juárez Cisneros (Note: Juárez Cisneros resigned his seat on 3 April 1997. Torres Blanco, his substitute, was sworn in on 15 April.); Gustavo Adolfo Torres Blanco	Institutional Revolutionary Party	1994–1997	56th Congress
1997	Pioquinto Damián Huato	Party of the Democratic Revolution	1997–2000	57th Congress
2000	Heriberto Huicochea Vázquez (Note: Huicochea Vázquez resigned his seat on 19 August 2002.); Lourdes Gallardo Pérez	Institutional Revolutionary Party	2000–2002; 2002–2003	58th Congress
2003	Mario Moreno Arcos	Institutional Revolutionary Party	2003–2006	59th Congress
2006	Carlos Sánchez Barrios (Note: Sánchez Barrios took leave of his seat from 1 August to 15 October 2008 to run (unsuccessfully) for the municipal presidency of Chilpancingo.); Octavio Adolfo Klimek Alcaraz	Party of the Democratic Revolution	2006–2009	60th Congress
2009	Mario Moreno Arcos	Institutional Revolutionary Party	2009–2012	61st Congress
2012	Jorge Salgado Parra	Party of the Democratic Revolution	2012–2015	62nd Congress
2015	Beatriz Vélez Núñez	Institutional Revolutionary Party	2015–2018	63rd Congress
2018	Carlos Sánchez Barrios	National Regeneration Movement	2018–2021	64th Congress
2021	Carlos Sánchez Barrios	National Regeneration Movement	2021–2024	65th Congress
2024	Carlos Sánchez Barrios	National Regeneration Movement	2024–2027	66th Congress

== Presidential elections ==
Guerrero's 7th district
Election	District won by	Party or coalition	%
2018	Andrés Manuel López Obrador	Juntos Haremos Historia	69.5736
2024	Claudia Sheinbaum Pardo	Sigamos Haciendo Historia	67.6615
