= 2015 Guerrero state elections =

← 2012	7 June 2015	2018 →
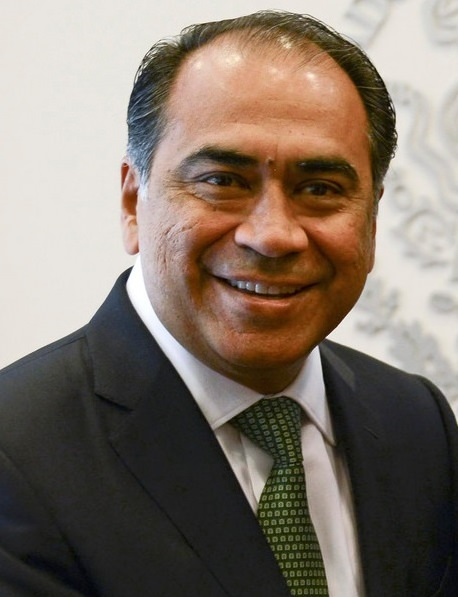

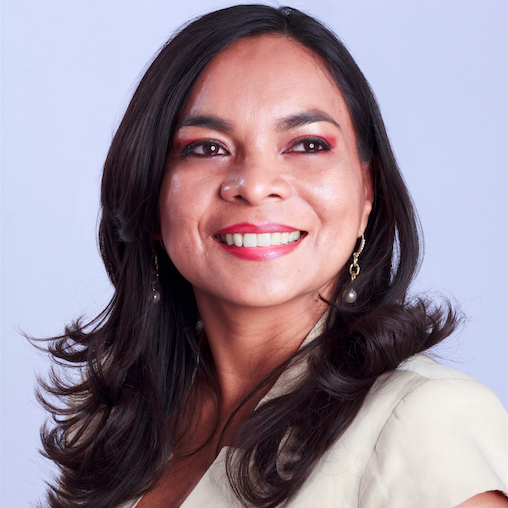

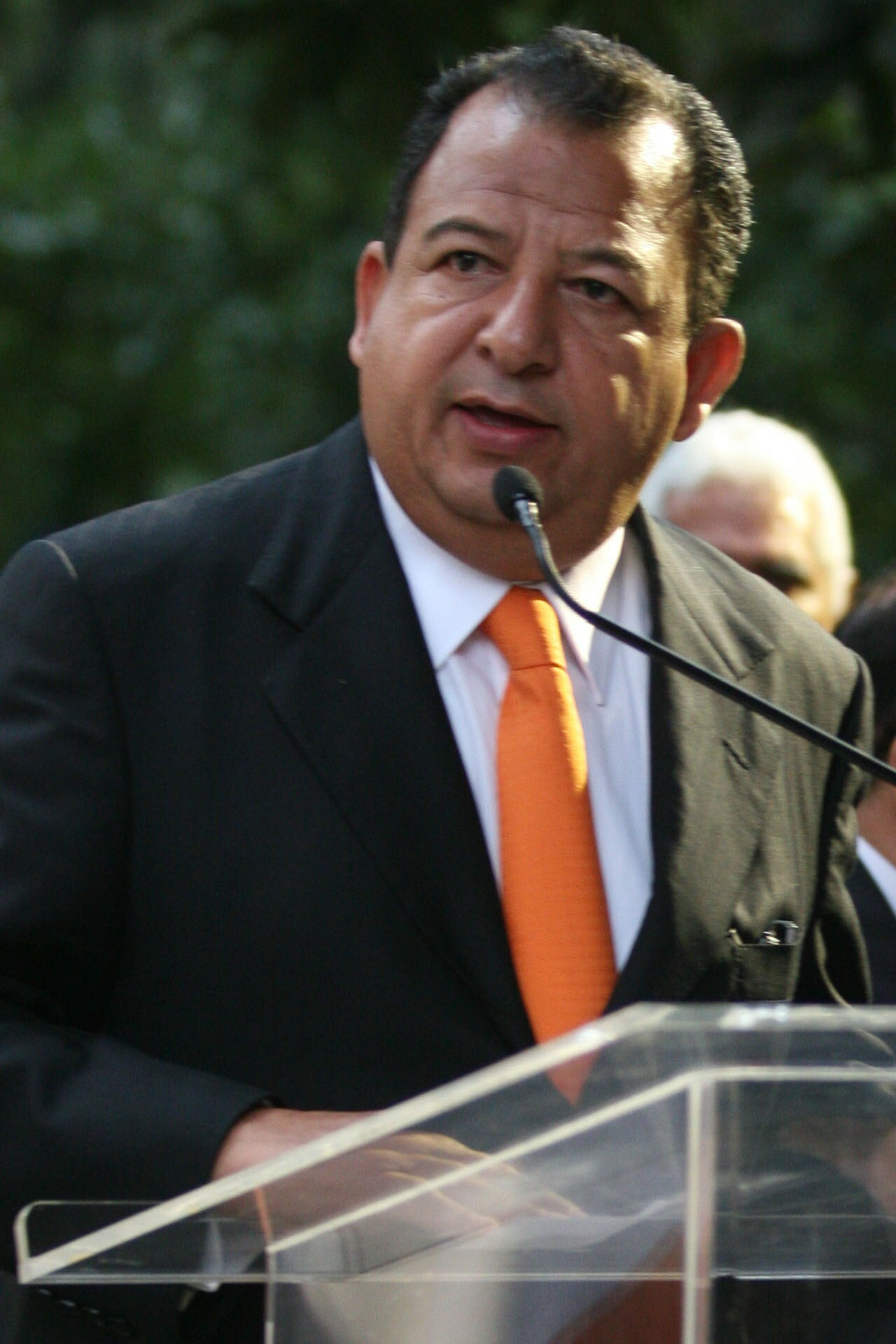
Candidate	Héctor Flores	Beatriz Morga	Luis Walton
Party	PRI	PRD	MC
Popular vote	558,662	473,695	109,329
Percentage	40.94%	34.71%	8.01%
Governor before election
Rogelio Martínez
PRD
Elected Governor
Héctor Flores
PRI

The 2015 Guerrero state elections were held on Sunday 7 June 2015, with the following positions being renewed:

- Governors of Guerrero. Head of the Executive Branch of the state, elected for a period of six years, not re-electable in any case.
- 46 deputies to the Congress of Guerrero. 28 elected by relative majority in each of the Electoral Districts and 18 elected by the principle of proportional representation through a list system.
- Members of 81 municipal councils, elected for a period of three years, not re-electable for the immediate period.

== Governor ==
The ten national political parties were able to register candidates for the governorship, individually or through common candidacies or electoral coalitions. In addition, a Guerrero local party named Partido de los Pobres de Guerrero (lit. Guerrero Poor People's Party) participated in the race as well.

Election Result
Local District Winner
Astudillo Mojica
Party	Candidate	Votes	%
PRI	Héctor Astudillo Flores	558,662	40.94
PVEM	Héctor Astudillo Flores	558,662	40.94
PRD	Beatriz Mojica Morga	473,695	34.71
PT	Beatriz Mojica Morga	473,695	34.71
MC	Luis Walton	109,329	8.01
PAN	Jorge Camacho Peñaloza	66,794	4.90
Morena	Pablo Amílcar Sandoval	37,847	2.77
PNA	Karime Iyari Sevilla Álvarez	24,162	1.77
PPG	Godeleva Rodríguez Salmerón	12,716	0.93
PH	Alberto López Rosas	11,295	0.83
PES	Raymundo Nogueda Analco	8,901	0.65
Invalid votes		60,525	4.44
Total		1,363,926	

== Congressional deputies ==
Election result
Party	Votes	%	Seats	+/–
PRI	424,497	31.42	19	▲6
PRD	374,428	27.71	14	▼6
PVEM	81,145	6.01	6	▲3
MC	113,791	8.42	3	▼1
PT	65,487	4.85	2	Steady
PAN	77,270	5.72	1	▼2
Morena	49,751	3.68	1	New
Others	164,805	12.20	0	▼1
Total	1,351,174	100.00	46	–

== Municipal councils ==
Election result
Party/Alliance	Municipalities
PRI-PVEM	40
PRD-PT	24
PAN	6
MC	6
PVEM	2
PRI	1
PNA	1
PPG	1
Total	81
