= Manuel Añorve Baños =

Mexican politician (born 1957)

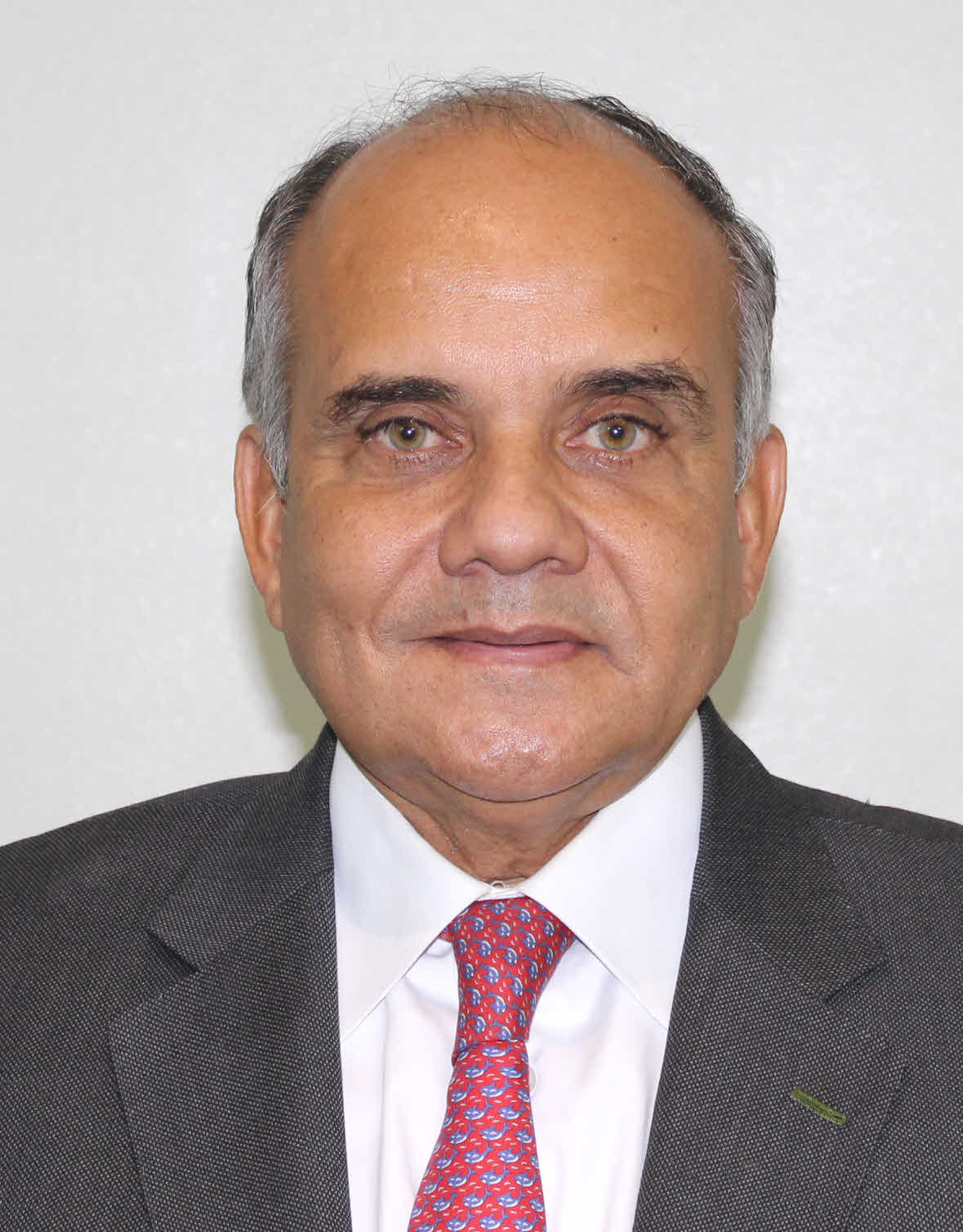

Senator of the Congress of the Union from Guerrero
- Incumbent
- Assumed office 1 September 2018 Serving with Félix Salgado Macedonio and Nestora Salgado
- Preceded by: René Juárez Cisneros

Municipal president of Acapulco
- In office 2011–2012
- Preceded by: José Luis Ávila Sánchez
- Succeeded by: Verónica Escobar Romo
- In office 2009–2010
- Preceded by: César Zambrano Pérez
- Succeeded by: Alejandro Porcayo Rivera
- In office 1998–1999
- Preceded by: César Varela Blanco
- Succeeded by: Ana María Castilleja Mendieta
- In office 1997–1998
- Preceded by: Juan Salgado Tenorio
- Succeeded by: César Varela Blanco

Personal details
- Born: 15 May 1957 (age 69) Ometepec, Guerrero, Mexico
- Party: Institutional Revolutionary Party (PRI)
- Education: UNAM

Manuel Añorve Baños (born 15 May 1957) is a Mexican politician affiliated with the Institutional Revolutionary Party (PRI). He served as a senator in the 64th and 65th Legislature of the Mexican Congress, representing the state of Guerrero and was re-elected to the same seat in 2024. He also is a two-time federal deputy and two-time former mayor of Acapulco.

== Life ==
Añorve was born in Ometepec, Guerrero, Mexico, on 15 May 1957. Añorve graduated with his law degree from the National Autonomous University of Mexico (UNAM) in 1981; he later returned to the university to obtain his master's and doctoral degrees. He was the private secretary to the head of the Secretariat of Agrarian Reform from 1981 to 1982. After several years spent earning more degrees, writing a book titled Los Servicios Públicos Municipales (Municipal Public Services), and becoming a state political councilor for the PRI, Añorve returned to the federal government in 1991 as the representative of Banobras in Guerrero. In 1993, he became a city councilor in Acapulco, simultaneously heading up the city's water and sewer commission and serving as the secretary general of the municipal PRI organization there.

In 1996, Añorve was named as the state secretary of finances and administration. A year later, however, Hurricane Pauline slammed into Acapulco and prompted a municipal political crisis that concluded with the resignation of the city's municipal president, Juan Salgado Tenorio. Interim Governor Ángel Aguirre Rivero selected Añorve, his cousin, as the interim municipal president of Acapulco, filling the remaining two years of Tenorio's term. With his term expired, in 1999, Añorve became a state deputy, cutting that term short in order to become a federal deputy in the LVIII Legislature. He was among the PRI's highest-ranking officials, becoming the secretary of the board of directors of the Permanent Commission, along with three normal commission assignments.

Añorve resurfaced in 2006 as the coordinator of advisors to the PRI caucus in the Senate. He left that job to run again for mayor of Acapulco, winning a second term and serving from 2009 to 2012. While serving as municipal president, he ran for Governor of Guerrero in 2010.

The PRI named Añorve a proportional representation deputy from the fourth region to the 62nd Legislature, in which he served between 2012 and 2015. He presided over the Administration Committee and special commission commemorating the bicentennial of the Congreso de Anáhuac and the Sentimientos de la Nación, and he held secretarial posts on three commissions—National Defense, Jurisdictional, and Oversight of the Supreme Auditor of the Federation—along with two other regular assignments. Añorve made another bid for the PRI gubernatorial nomination in 2015, but the party chose Héctor Astudillo Flores instead.

In 2018, Añorve ran for Senate as the Todos por México coalition candidate; the ticket finished second, sending him to the legislature as the first minority senator.

Añorve Baños won re-election as one of Guerrero's senators in the 2024 Senate election, occupying the first place on the Fuerza y Corazón por México coalition's two-name formula.

== See also ==
- List of mayors of Acapulco
