= Carlos Sánchez Barrios =

Mexican politician

- Born: 17 August 1957 (age 69); Zumpango del Río, Guerrero, Mexico
- Education: Autonomous University of Guerrero
- Occupation: Politician
- Political party: MORENA; PRD (former)

Carlos Sánchez Barrios (born 17 August 1957) is a Mexican politician affiliated with the National Regeneration Movement (Morena) who previously belonged to the Party of the Democratic Revolution (PRD).

A native of Zumpango, Guerrero, Sánchez Barrios served as municipal president of his home town from 1996 to 1999 and as a local deputy in the 57th session of the Congress of Guerrero from 2002 to 2005.

He was elected to the Chamber of Deputies for Guerrero's seventh district on the PRD ticket in the 2006 general election. In 2008 he ran for the municipal presidency of Chilpancingo but was defeated by Héctor Astudillo Flores of the PRI.

As a member of Morena, he was re-elected for Guerrero's seventh district in the 2018, 2021 and 2024 elections.
