= Ricardo Taja Ramírez =

Mexican politician

Ricardo Taja Ramírez (8 April 1983 – 21 December 2023) was a Mexican politician. At different times he belonged to the Party of the Democratic Revolution (PRD), the Institutional Revolutionary Party (PRI) and the National Regeneration Movement (Morena).

== Political career ==
From 2008 to 2012 Taja Ramírez was a member of the municipal council (regidor) of Acapulco for the PRD and, in 2012, he was elected to a three-year term in the Congress of Guerrero.

In the 2015 federal mid-terms, he was elected to the Chamber of Deputies to represent the ninth district of Guerrero for the PRI. During his time in Congress he served as the secretary of the Chamber's energy committee and on the budget and public accounts committee and the civil protection committee. He took a leave of absence from his seat from January to August 2018.

He ran twice for the municipal presidency of Acapulco: in 2018, for a coalition of the PRI and the Ecologist Green Party of Mexico (PVEM), and in 2021, for a PRI–PRD coalition. He lost to the Morena candidate in both contests.

In October 2023 he announced his affiliation with Morena and his intention to run for the municipal presidency for a third time in the 2024 election.

== Murder ==
Taja Ramírez was shot and killed at a pozolería in the Diamante sector of Acapulco on 21 December 2023. He was reported as preparing another run for Congress at the time of his death.
