= Rosario Merlín García =

Mexican politician

- Born: 1 November 1964 (age 61); Acapulco, Guerrero, Mexico
- Occupation: Politician
- Political party: PRD MORENA

María del Rosario Merlín García (Note: In this Mexican name, the surname is Merlín and the second or maternal family name is García.) (born 1 November 1964) is a Mexican politician. Formerly affiliated with the Party of the Democratic Revolution (PRD), she later shifted allegiance to the National Regeneration Movement (Morena).

Merlín García was born in Acapulco, Guerrero, in 1964. In 2000–2003 she served in the Congress of Guerrero. She was elected to the Chamber of Deputies for the ninth district of Guerrero on three occasions: in 2012 for the PRD, and in 2018 and 2021 for Morena. Between March and May 2021 she took a leave of absence from her seat to seek Morena's nomination for the municipal presidency of Acapulco but lost to Abelina López Rodríguez.

She was the last person to represent the ninth district before its dissolution in 2022.
