= Chichihualco =

City in the Mexican state of Guerrero

- Municipal seat and city

- Location in Mexico Chichihualco (Mexico)
- Coordinates: 17.655°N 99.674°W
- Country: Mexico
- State: Guerrero
- Municipality: Leonardo Bravo
- Elevation: 1,141 m (3,743 ft)

Population (2010)
  - Total: 10,690
- Time zone: UTC-6 (Zona Centro)

Chichihualco is a city in the south of Mexico. It forms the administrative centre of the municipality of Leonardo Bravo It is located in the centre of the state of Guerrero, about 21 kilometres northwest of the state capital, Chilpancingo.

According to Mexico's Instituto Nacional para el Federalismo y el Desarrollo Municipal (National Institute for Federalism and Municipal Development, INAFED), the city was home to 5,164 men and 5,526 women, a total of 10,690 inhabitants in 2010. It is found at an altitude of 1,141 metres above mean sea level, a latitude of 17°39′28″ north and a longitude of 99°40′35″ west.

In the local Nahuatl language, the name literally means 'in the bosom', translated as 'place where they suckle' or 'place of the wet nurses'.

One source has it that Maria Fermina Rivera died in action in Chichihualco while fighting alongside Vicente Guerrero in February 1821, although another source disputes this.
