= Beatriz Mojica =

Mexican politician

Beatriz Mojica Morga
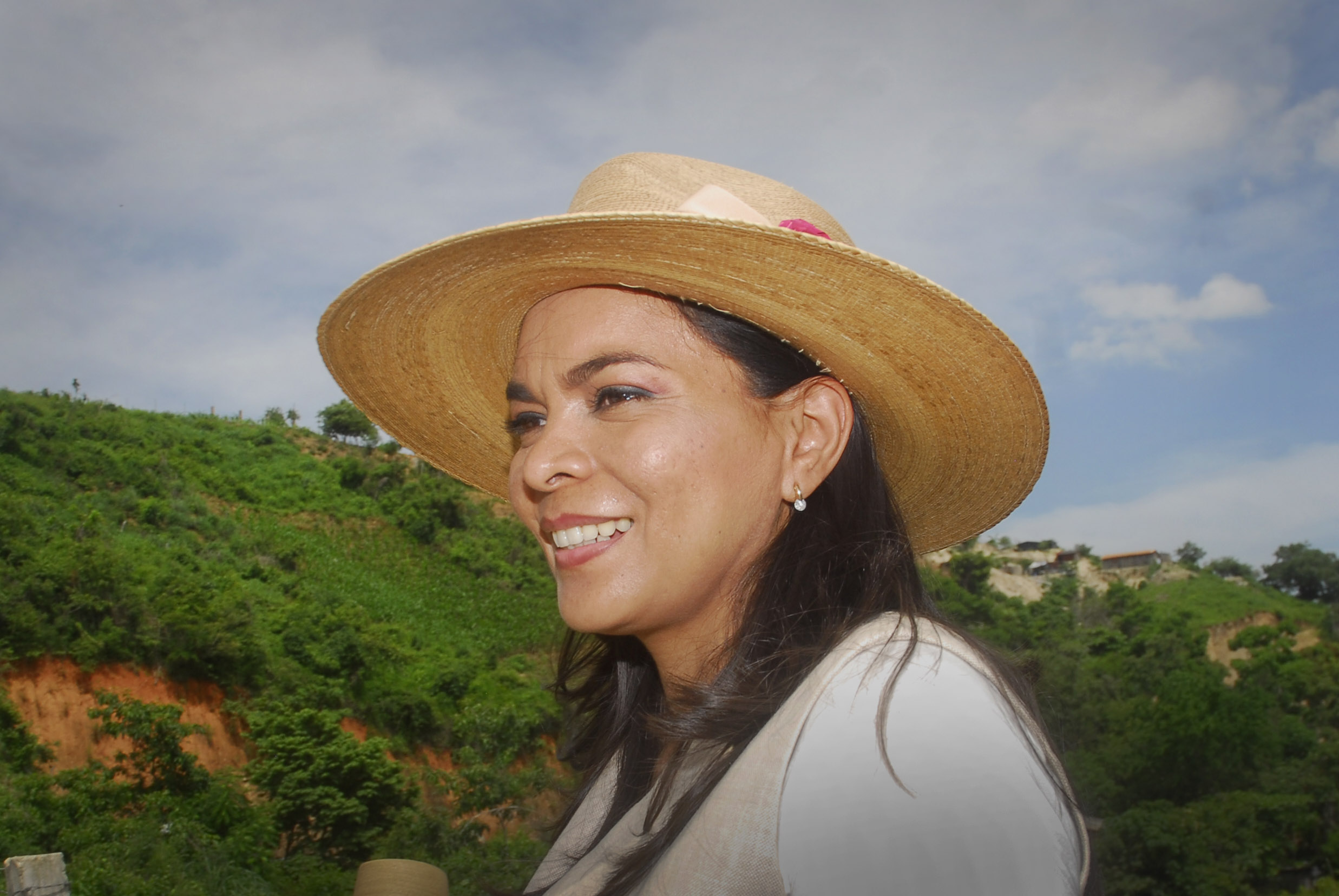
- Born: 25 February 1973 (age 53); Azoyú, Guerrero, Mexico
- Occupation: Politician
- Political party: PRD, Morena

Beatriz Mojica Morga (Note: In this Mexican name, the surname is Mojica and the second or maternal family name is Morga.) (born 25 February 1973) is a Mexican politician from the state of Guerrero. At different times she has been affiliated with both the Party of the Democratic Revolution (PRD) and the National Regeneration Movement (Morena).

Mojica Morga was born in Azoyú, Guerrero, on 25 February 1973. In the 2003 mid-terms she was elected to the Chamber of Deputies as a plurinominal deputy for the PRD during the 59th Congress.

She fought the 2015 gubernatorial election in Guerrero, representing a PRD–PT coalition, but lost to Héctor Astudillo Flores of the Institutional Revolutionary Party (PRI).

Mojica Morga won election as one of Guerrero's senators in the 2024 Senate election, occupying the first place on the National Regeneration Movement's two-name formula.

On 14 September 2026, she was announced as Morena's "state coordinator for the defence of the transformation and national sovereignty", in which capacity she is expected to represent the party in the Guerrero gubernatorial election of 6 June 2027.
