= Alejandro Arcos =

Mexican mayor (1981–2024)

Municipal president of Chilpancingo de los Bravo
- In office 1 October 2024 – 6 October 2024
- Preceded by: Norma Otilia Hernández Martínez
- Succeeded by: Gustavo Alarcón Herrera

Member of the Congress of Guerrero for the 1st district
- In office 1 September 2012 – 31 August 2015
- Preceded by: Ricardo Moreno Arcos
- Succeeded by: Víctor Manuel Martínez Toledo

Personal details
- Born: 12 February 1981 Chilpancingo de los Bravo, Guerrero, Mexico
- Died: 6 October 2024 (aged 43) Chilpancingo de los Bravo, Guerrero, Mexico
- Cause of death: Assassination
- Party: Party of the Democratic Revolution
- Children: 1
- Education: Universidad Sentimientos de la Nación

Alejandro Arcos Catalán (12 February 1981 – 6 October 2024) was a Mexican politician. Elected municipal president of Chilpancingo de los Bravo, capital of the state of Guerrero, in the June 2024 election, he was assassinated after six days in office.

== Early life ==
Alejandro Arcos Catalán was born in Chilpancingo de los Bravo on 12 February 1981. Arcos earned a Licentiate in political science and public administration from the Universidad Sentimientos de la Nación.

== Political career ==
Arcos represented the 1st district in the LX Legislature of the Congress of Guerrero as a member of the Party of the Democratic Revolution (PRD). Arcos also unsuccessfully ran for municipal president of Chilpancingo de los Bravo in 2021.

In March 2024, Arcos was announced as the PRI-PAN-PRD coalition's candidate for the municipal presidency of Chilpancingo. Chilpancingo is known for an ongoing war "between two drug gangs, the Ardillos and the Tlacos". During the 2024 election campaign, Arcos was the only candidate who was allowed to stump in areas controlled by the Ardillos. In exchange for the backing of the Ardillos, Arcos agreed to give them a slice of Chilpancingo's public works budget. In the June 2024 election, he won the election for municipal president of Chilpancingo de los Bravo, capital of the state of Guerrero, by 1,700 votes and took office on 1 October 2024. His focus during his brief time in office included initiatives to increase local security through technology and collaboration with the Mexican Army. He emphasized transparency and future-oriented policies. He tried to create peace between the Ardillos and the Tlacos. After he made overtures to the Tlacos, Arcos' deputy and Chilpancingo's incoming security chief were murdered.

== Death ==
On 6 October 2024, Arcos helped bring water and other supplies to communities affected by Hurricane John. He left his staff behind to attend a private meeting shortly before his assassination. After his murder, his severed head was displayed on the roof of a truck while his body was left in the vehicle — just days after the inauguration of Claudia Sheinbaum as President of Mexico and amid an escalation of cartel violence in Culiacán. The assassination of the serving leader in a Mexican state's capital was unprecedented.

The local government in Chilpancingo declared three days of mourning after his death, and his position as municipal president was filled by Gustavo Alarcón Herrera. There was a memorial Mass at Chilpancingo Cathedral.

Authorities initially considered criminal gangs to be the main cause for his murder. On 12 November, a retired military officer turned prosecutor was arrested on suspicion of involvement in the killing.

== See also ==
- List of municipal presidents of Chilpancingo de los Bravo
- List of politicians killed during the 2024 Mexican elections
