= Mario Moreno Arcos =

Mexican politician

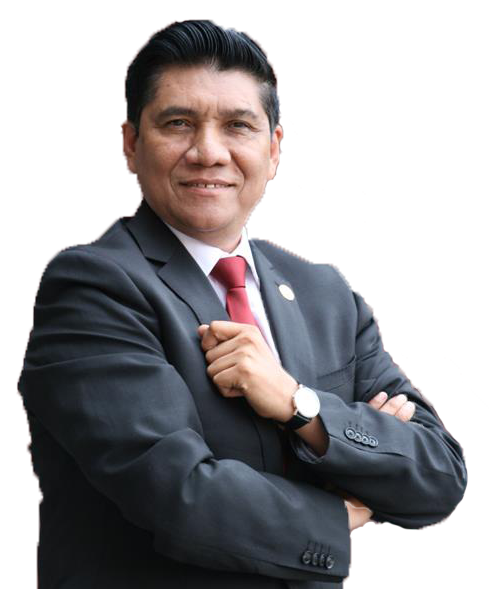
- Born: 15 October 1958 (age 67); Izotepec, Guerrero, Mexico
- Occupation: Politician
- Political party: PRI

Mario Moreno Arcos (born 15 October 1958) is a Mexican politician. At different times he has been affiliated with both the Institutional Revolutionary Party (PRI) and the Citizens' Movement (MC).

In the 2003 mid-terms he was elected to the Chamber of Deputies to represent the seventh district of Guerrero during the 59th Congress. He was re-elected to that same seat in the 2009 mid-terms.

Moreno Arcos was first elected to office as a local deputy in the 56th session of the Congress of Guerrero. He then served as municipal president of Chilpancingo de los Bravo from 2005 to 2008 and again in 2012 following the Guerrero state election. He announced his candidacy for the governorship of Guerrero in January 2021.

Moreno sought election as one of Guerrero's senators in the 2024 Senate election, occupying the first place on the Citizens' Movement's two-name formula. In that election, the Citizens' Movement placed third behind the National Regeneration Movement and the Fuerza y Corazón por México coalition of the PRI, PAN and PRD.

Moreno Arcos is the cousin of Humberto Moreno Catalán, spokesperson for the paramilitary group called "Los Tlacos" and José Carlos "La Calentura" Moreno Flores, arrested in 2011 and accused by the federal government of being the operator of Joaquín "El Chapo" Guzmán in the Sierra de Guerrero.
