= Huicochea =

Huicochea is a derived Basque surname Goikoetxea. Notable people with the surname include:

- Fidel Rubí Huicochea (born 1982), Mexican politician
- Heriberto Huicochea (born 1962), Mexican politician
