= Caritino Maldonado Pérez =

Mexican politician

Caritino Maldonado Pérez (October 5, 1915 – April 17, 1971) was a Mexican PRI politician who served as the Governor of Guerrero from 1969 until 1971. Maldonado died in an aviation accident on 17 April 1971 in Leonardo Bravo, and was succeeded by Israel Nogueda Otero.
