= 9th federal electoral district of Guerrero =

Defunct federal electoral district of Mexico

Coordinates: 16°53′N 99°52′W

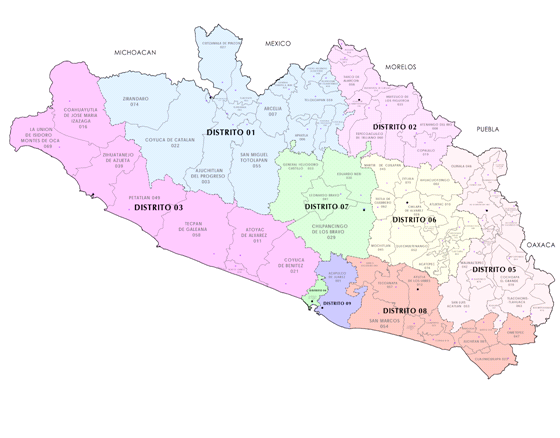
Guerrero under the 2017–2022 districting plan

The 9th federal electoral district of Guerrero (Spanish: Distrito electoral federal 09 de Guerrero) was a federal electoral district of the Mexican state of Guerrero from 1977 to 2024. An earlier 9th district was abolished in 1930. (Note: An amendment to Article 52 of the Constitution in 1928 changed the original provision of "one deputy per 60,000 inhabitants" to "one deputy per 100,000"; as a result, the size of the Chamber of Deputies fell from 281 in the 1928 election to 171 in 1934.)

During its existence, the 9th district returned one deputy to the Chamber of Deputies for each of the 51st to 65th sessions of Congress. Votes cast in the district also counted towards the calculation of proportional representation ("plurinominal") deputies elected from the country's electoral regions.

Created as part of the 1977 political reforms, it was first contested in the 1979 mid-term election and elected its last deputy in the 2021 mid-terms. It was dissolved by the National Electoral Institute (INE) in its 2023 redistricting process because the state's population no longer warranted nine districts, though the incumbent deputy, Rosario Merlín García of the National Regeneration Movement (Morena), continued to represent the district until 2024.

== Territory ==
Evolution of electoral district numbers
	1974	1978	1996	2005	2017	2023
Guerrero	6	10	10	9	9	8
Chamber of Deputies	196	300				

2017–2022

In its final form, the 9th district covered 159 electoral precincts (secciones electorales) in the municipality of Acapulco. The head town (cabecera distrital), where results from individual polling stations were gathered together and tallied, was the port city of Acapulco.

2005–2017

Guerrero lost its 10th district in the 2005 redistricting process. Between 2005 and 2017, the 9th district comprised 162 precincts in the eastern portion of the municipality of Acapulco. The head town was Acapulco.

1996–2005

Under the 1996 districting plan, which allocated Guerrero ten districts, the 9th district was located in the municipality of Acapulco. It covered a part of the urban area and the municipality's rural hinterland. (Note: The urban core of Acapulco made up the 10th district.) The head town was at Acapulco.

1978–1996

The districting scheme in force from 1978 to 1996 was the result of the 1977 electoral reforms, which increased the number of single-member seats in the Chamber of Deputies from 196 to 300. Under that plan, Guerrero's district allocation rose from six to ten. The newly created 9th district had its head town at Tecpan de Galeana in the Costa Grande region and it covered the municipalities of Atoyac de Álvarez, Benito Juárez, José Azueta, Petatlán, Tecpan de Galeana and La Unión.

== Deputies returned to Congress ==
(Mexico) National parties
- Current
- PAN
- PRI
- PT
- PVEM
- MC
- Morena
- Defunct or local only
- PLM
- PNR
- PRM
- PNM
- PP
- PPS
- PARM
- PFCRN
- Convergencia
- PANAL
- PSD
- PES
- PES
- PRD

Guerrero's 9th district
Election	Deputy	Party	Term	Legislature
The 9th district was suspended between 1930 and 1978
1979	José María Serna Maciel	Institutional Revolutionary Party	1979–1982	51st Congress
1982	Efraín Zúñiga Galeana	Institutional Revolutionary Party	1982–1985	52nd Congress
1985	Nabor Ojeda Delgado	Institutional Revolutionary Party	1985–1988	53rd Congress
1988	María Inés Solís González	Institutional Revolutionary Party	1988–1991	54th Congress
1991	Efraín Zúñiga Galeana	Institutional Revolutionary Party	1991–1994	55th Congress
1994	Gabino Fernández Serna	Institutional Revolutionary Party	1994–1997	56th Congress
1997	Pablo Sandoval Ramírez	Party of the Democratic Revolution	1997–2000	57th Congress
2000	Juan José Nogueda Ruiz	Institutional Revolutionary Party	2000–2003	58th Congress
2003	Rosario Herrera Ascencio	Party of the Democratic Revolution	2003–2006	59th Congress
2006	César Flores Maldonado	Party of the Democratic Revolution	2006–2009	60th Congress
2009	Fermín Alvarado Arroyo	Institutional Revolutionary Party	2009–2012	61st Congress
2012	Rosario Merlín García	Party of the Democratic Revolution	2012–2015	62nd Congress
2015	Ricardo Taja Ramírez	Institutional Revolutionary Party	2015–2018	63rd Congress
2018	Rosario Merlín García	National Regeneration Movement	2018–2021	64th Congress
2021	Rosario Merlín García	National Regeneration Movement	2021–2024	65th Congress

== Presidential elections ==
Guerrero's 9th district
Election	District won by	Party or coalition	%
2018	Andrés Manuel López Obrador	Juntos Haremos Historia	66.9349
