= Octavio Klimek Alcaraz =

Mexican politician

- Born: 30 December 1962 (age 63); Guerrero, Mexico
- Education: UAM Xochimilco; TU Dresden
- Occupation: Politician
- Political party: PRD

Octavio Adolfo Klimek Alcaraz (born 30 December 1962) is a Mexican politician from the Party of the Democratic Revolution (PRD). Between August and October 2008 he represented the seventh district of Guerrero in the Chamber of Deputies as the substitute of Carlos Sánchez Barrios.
