= Leonardo Bravo =

Leonardo Bravo may refer to:

- Leonardo Bravo (general officer) (1764–1823), participated in the first stage of the independence of Mexico
- Leonardo Bravo (municipality), Guerrero, Mexico, named for the officer
