= Xavier Olea Muñoz =

Mexican lawyer and prosecutor

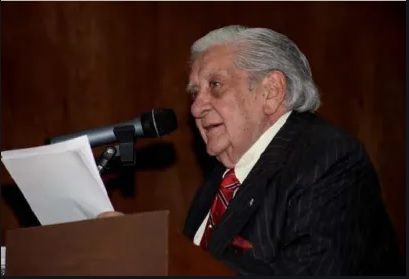

Governor of Guerrero
- In office January 31, 1975 – April 1, 1975
- Preceded by: Israel Nogueda Otero
- Succeeded by: Rubén Figueroa Figueroa

Personal details
- Born: December 1, 1923 Iguala, Guerrero
- Died: December 1, 2015 (aged 92) Taxco de Alarcón, Guerrero
- Party: Institutional Revolutionary Party (PRI)
- Occupation: Lawyer; Politician

Xavier Olea Muñoz (December 1, 1923 – December 1, 2015) was a Mexican lawyer, prosecutor, diplomat, and politician. He briefly served as the Governor of Guerrero from January 31, 1975, until April 1, 1975, after his predecessor, Governor Israel Nogueda Otero, was removed from office. Olea Muñoz also served as the Ambassador of Mexico to several countries. In 1976, he was appointed Ambassador of Mexico to France. He then served as Ambassador to Japan, as well as concurrent Ambassador to South Korea, from 1977 until 1979.

Olea Muñoz was born in Iguala, Guerrero, Mexico, on December 1, 1923. He received a bachelor's from the School of Law at the National Autonomous University of Mexico (UNAM) and completed law school four years later. Following law school, he became the personal representative of Adolfo López Mateos, who was elected President of Mexico in 1958.

By 1960, Olea had become attorney general of his home state of Guerrero, a position he held until January 4, 1961. In 1962, he became the president of the alumni society of the UNAM's School of Law. As president, he presented a certificate and gold medal to U.S. President John F. Kennedy.

The Sociedad Mexicana de Geografía y Estadística honored him with a merit award in 1965. In 1966, Olea Muñoz was appointed as an adviser to Mexican President Gustavo Díaz Ordaz.

In 1969, Olea Muñoz was elected vice president of the International Union of Lawyers, a professional organization headquartered in Brussels, Belgium. He held a series of positions with Mexico's civil service and federal government, including the Mexican Cultural Institute and the Secretariat of Tourism.

In January 1975, the federal Congress of the Union removed Guerrero Governor Israel Nogueda Otero from office. Congress appointed Xavier Olea Muñoz as the interim Governor of Guerrero. Olea Muñoz, who served two months as acting Governor, was sworn into office on January 31, 1975. He was succeeded by Rubén Figueroa Figueroa on April 1, 1975.

Xavier Olea Muñoz began his diplomatic career shortly after leaving office as Governor of Guerrero. He was appointed as Mexico's Ambassador to France in 1976. He then served as Ambassador to Japan, with a concurrent ambassadorship to South Korea from 1977 until 1979. He also served as Mexico's Ambassador to the United Kingdom, Italy, Switzerland, the former Czechoslovakia, Poland, and the former Soviet Union during his career.

He joined the Party of the Democratic Revolution (PRD) during the 1990s. In 1998, Olea Muñoz was a PRD candidate for Governor of Guerrero, but lost his party's nomination to Félix Salgado Macedonio. Salgado was defeated in the 1999 Guerrero gubernatorial election by René Juárez Cisneros of PRI.

The city of Taxco de Alarcón, together with business leaders, politicians and the Catholic Church, honored Xavier Olea Muñoz with the key to the city in a ceremony on November 30, 2013.

Xavier Olea Muñoz died in the city of Taxco de Alarcón, Guerrero, on December 1, 2015, at the age of 92. His son, Xavier Olea Peláez, is also a criminal lawyer.
