= Saida Reyes Iruegas =

Mexican politician

Saida Reyes Iruegas (1970, Arcelia, Guerrero, Mexico) is a Mexican teacher and politician, deputy of the LXII Legislature of the Congress of the State of Guerrero on the bench of the National Regeneration Movement (Morena) until 2019.

== Education ==
Saida Reyes studied high school in the city of Saltillo, Coahuila, to later study a degree in social work at the Autonomous University of Coahuila during the years 1987–1991. She also has a master's degree in Organizational Administration and Educational Development, as well as a doctorate in Educational Sciences.

== Professional career ==
Reyes Iruegas worked as a social worker at the Cancerology Center of the State of Guerrero from 1993 to 1997, later she would be a prefect (1997-2002) and teacher (2002-2018) at the Tierra Caliente Regional Normal School, in Guerrero.

She has also participated in the Movimiento Magisterial Calentano in coordination and political activism in favor of Guerrero's education workers during 2016.

== Political career ==
Deputy mandate

In 2018, Saida Reyes entered the list of candidates for a plurinominal deputy through Morena in the State of Guerrero. After the 2018 Mexican Federal Elections, on August 28 of the same year, Saida Reyes received the constancy as a plurinominal deputy for the Congress of the State of Guerrero.
