= Kilometro =

Kilometro may refer to:

- Kilometre, a unit of length in the metric system, equal to one thousand metres
- "Kilometro" (song), a 2014 song by Sarah Geronimo
- Kilómetro 30, town in Acapulco, Mexico
- Kilometroak, celebration in Basque, Spain
