= Israel Nogueda Otero =

Mexican politician and economist

Governor of Guerrero
- In office 20 April 1971 – 31 January 1975
- Preceded by: Caritino Maldonado Pérez; Roberto Rodríguez Mercado (interim)
- Succeeded by: Xavier Olea Muñoz

Member of the Chamber of Deputies for Guerrero's 4th district
- In office 1 September 1967 – 26 December 1968
- Preceded by: Rafael Camacho Salgado
- Succeeded by: Alfonso Argudín Alcaraz

Personal details
- Born: January 16, 1935 Atoyac de Álvarez, Guerrero, Mexico
- Died: June 15, 2012 (aged 77) Mexico City
- Party: Institutional Revolutionary Party (PRI)

Israel Nogueda Otero (January 16, 1935 – June 15, 2012) was a Mexican politician, economist and member of the Institutional Revolutionary Party (PRI). Nogueda served as the Municipal President of Acapulco municipality from 1969 to 1971 and the Governor of Guerrero from 1971 until 1975.

Nogueda Otero was born in Atoyac de Álvarez, Guerrero, Mexico, on January 16, 1935. He earned a degree in economics from the National Autonomous University of Mexico.

In April 1971, Nogueda became the Governor of Guerrero following the death of his predecessor, Caritino Maldonado Pérez, who died in office. During Nogueda's tenure, the state government faced a guerrilla insurgency led by Genaro Vázquez Rojas and Lucio Cabañas, who operated in Guerrero.

Noting the worsening crisis in Guerrero, the federal Congress of the Union removed Governor Israel Nogueda Otero from office in January 1975. Congress appointed a new interim governor, Xavier Olea Muñoz, who was sworn into office on January 31, 1975, as Nogueda's successor.

He later served on an internal state commissioner for the ruling Institutional Revolutionary Party (PRI).

Nogueda Otero died of a heart attack shortly after 11 p.m. on June 15, 2012, at his home in Mexico City at the age of 77. He was buried in Atoyac de Álvarez.

== See also ==
- List of mayors of Acapulco (municipality)
