= Fermín Alvarado Arroyo =

Mexican politician

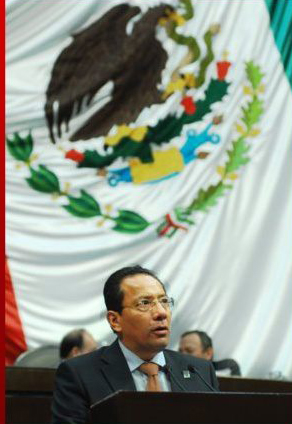
- Born: 7 July 1963 (age 62); Acapulco, Guerrero, Mexico
- Occupation: Politician
- Political party: PRI

Fermín Gerardo Alvarado Arroyo (born 7 July 1963) is a Mexican politician from the Institutional Revolutionary Party (PRI). In the 2009 mid-terms he was elected to the Chamber of Deputies to represent the ninth district of Guerrero during the 61st Congress.
