= Axaxacualco =

Town in the Mexican state of Guerrero

Coordinates: 17°48′30″N 99°27′30″W

Axaxacualco is a town in the Mexican state of Guerrero, located in the municipality of Eduardo Neri.
