= Evodio Velázquez Aguirre =

Mexican politician

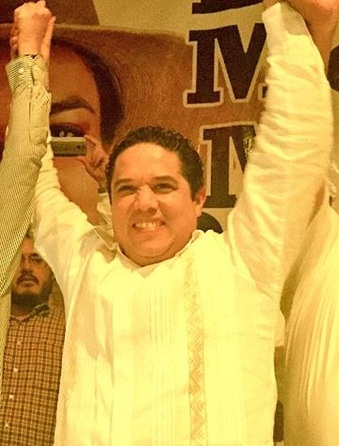
- Evodio Velázquez in 2015.

Municipal president of Acapulco
- In office 1 October 2015 – 30 September 2018
- Preceded by: Luis Uruñuela Fey
- Succeeded by: Adela Román Ocampo

Deputy of the LX Legislature of the Mexican Congress
- In office 1 September 2006 – 31 August 2009

Personal details
- Born: 2 February 1978 (age 48) Guerrero, Mexico
- Party: PRD
- Occupation: Politician

Jesús Evodio Velázquez Aguirre (born 2 February 1978) is a Mexican politician from the Party of the Democratic Revolution. From 2006 to 2009 he served as Deputy of the LX Legislature of the Mexican Congress representing Guerrero.

== See also ==
- List of mayors of Acapulco (municipality)
