= Zeferino Torreblanca =

Mexican politician (born 1954)

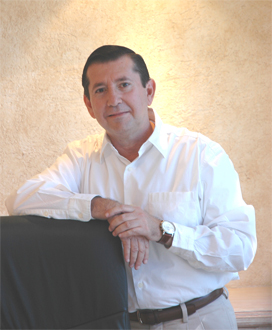

Governor of Guerrero
- In office 1 April 2005 – 31 March 2011
- Preceded by: René Juárez Cisneros
- Succeeded by: Ángel Aguirre Rivero

Municipal president of Acapulco
- In office 1 April 1999 – 31 March 2002
- Preceded by: Ana María Castilleja Mendieta
- Succeeded by: Alberto López Rosas

Personal details
- Born: March 14, 1954 (age 72) Guadalajara, Jalisco
- Party: Party of the Democratic Revolution

Carlos Zeferino Torreblanca Galindo (born March 14, 1954, in Guadalajara, Jalisco) is a Mexican politician previously affiliated with the PRD Party of the Democratic Revolution now affiliated with the PT (Labor Party) and former governor of Guerrero. He is the first non PRI member to hold the position.

== Personal life and education ==
Zeferino Torreblanca is the son of Luis Torreblanca González and Luisa Galindo Ochoa. He holds a bachelor's degree in accounting from the Monterrey Institute of Technology and Higher Education (ITESM).

== Political career ==
In 1993 he unsuccessfully ran for municipal president (mayor) of Acapulco representing the PRD. Then, in 1994, he secured a seat in the Chamber of Deputies of Mexico via proportional representation to serve during the LVI Legislature. In 1999 he ran again for municipal president of Acapulco and won. In February 2005 he was elected Governor of Guerrero and left office on March 31, 2011. In 2015 he received the backing of the PAN (National Action Party) and ran again for municipal president of Acapulco, but lost. In 2018 he ran again for this position, but this time with the PT (Labor Party).

== See also ==
- List of mayors of Acapulco (municipality)

Preceded by René Juárez	Governor of Guerrero; 2005– 2011	Succeeded by Ángel Aguirre Rivero
Preceded by Ana María Castilleja	Municipal president of Acapulco; 1999 – 2002	Succeeded by Alberto López
