= Nabor Ojeda Delgado =

Mexican politician

- Born: 6 June 1947 (age 79); Iguala, Guerrero, Mexico
- Education: IPN
- Occupation: Politician
- Political party: PRI

Gustavo Nabor Ojeda Delgado (born 6 June 1947) is a Mexican politician from the Institutional Revolutionary Party (PRI). He has served in the Chamber of Deputies during four sessions of Congress:

- the 49th (1973–1976), for Guerrero's 6th,
- the 53rd (1985–1988), for Guerrero's 9th,
- the 55th (1991–1994), for Guerrero's 7th,
- and the 58th (2000–2003), as a plurinominal deputy.
