= Merlin (surname) =

Merlin is a surname. Notable people with the surname include:

- Albert Merlin (1931–2015), French economist and vice-president of the "Presaje" institute
- Alessandra Merlin (born 1975), retired Italian alpine skier
- Alfred Merlin (1876–1965), French historian and archaeologist
- André Merlin (1911–1960), French tennis player
- Antoine Christophe Merlin (1762–1833), also known as Merlin de Thionville, French politician
- Antoine François Eugène Merlin (1778–1854), French soldier and general
- Arnaud Merlin (born 1963), French jazz critic, music journalist and radio producer
- Christian Merlin (born 1964), French contemporary music critic and musicologist
- Christine Merlin (born 1980), French chronobiologist and an associate professor of biology
- Christophe Antoine Merlin (1771–1839), French cavalry general in the Napoleonic Wars
- Dino Merlin (born 1962), Bosnian musician
- Émile Merlin (1875–1938), Belgian mathematician and astronomer
- Ernest Merlin (1886–1959), British cyclist
- Gerald Merlin (1884–1945), British sports shooter
- Henry Beaufoy Merlin (1830–1873), Australian photographer, showman, illusionist and illustrator
- Jacques Merlin (1480–1541), French theologian and book editor
- Jan Merlin (1925–2019), American character actor, television writer, and author
- Jean-Claude Merlin (born 1954), French astronomer
- Joanna Merlin (1931–2023), American actress and casting director
- John Joseph Merlin (1735–1803), Belgian inventor and horologist
- Kristen Merlin (born 1984), American country singer
- Laurent Merlin (born 1984), French footballer
- Lina Merlin (1887–1979), Italian politician
- Martial Henri Merlin (1860–1935), French colonial administrator
- Pierre Merlin (1918–2000), French artist and jazz musician
- Pierre Merlin (geographer) (1937–2026), French geographer
- Philippe-Antoine Merlin de Douai (1754–1838) French politician and lawyer
- Quentin Merlin (born 2002), French footballer
- Renzo Merlin (1923–2003), Italian professional football player
- Roberto Merlin, Argentine physicist
- Serge Merlin (1933–2019), French actor
- Shmuel Merlin (1910–1994), Zionist activist, Irgun member and Israeli politician
- Sidney Merlin (1856–1952), Greek botanist and sports shooter
- Umberto Merlin (1885–1964), Italian lawyer and politician
