= Rosario Herrera Ascencio =

Mexican politician

- Born: 15 August 1958 (age 67); Acapulco, Guerrero, Mexico
- Occupations: Teacher and politician
- Political party: PRD

María del Rosario Herrera Ascencio (born 15 August 1958) is a Mexican politician affiliated with the Party of the Democratic Revolution (PRD). In the 2003 mid-terms she was elected to the Chamber of Deputies to represent the ninth district of Guerrero during the 59th Congress.
