= Zumpango del Río =

City in the Mexican state of Guerrero

- Municipal seat and city
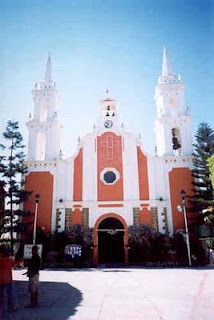
- Nickname: Xumpango
- Location in Mexico Zumpango del Río (Mexico)
- Coordinates: 17°39′N 99°30′W
- Country: Mexico
- State: Guerrero
- Municipality: Eduardo Neri
- Region: Sierra Madre del Sur
- Elevation: 1,012 m (3,320 ft)

Population (2010)
  - Total: 24,719
  - Ethnicities: Mestizos; Nahuas
  - Religions: Roman Catholic Church
- Time zone: UTC-6 (Zona Centro)
- Postal code: 40180

Zumpango del Río is the seat of the municipality of Eduardo Neri, in the southern Mexican state of Guerrero.

The Spanish discovered silver lodes here in 1531, and started commercial silver mining in the area. Francisco de Hoyos and Juan Juan Jaramillo made the discovery when returning from a military expedition to Guerrero. Using Indian slave labor until the ban from doing so was enforced in 1550, the mines produced 1000 pounds of silver by 1539. Prominent mine owners included Juan de Burgos and Hernán Cortés. Most of the mines were abandoned by 1582 however.

== History ==
Zumpango was originally called Zompanco in Nahuatl, and was a Coixca settlement. At some point it was conquered by the Aztec Empire and became the center of a strategic province that also included Tixtla, Mochitlán and Huitziltepec. As tribute, this province paid gold powder and slaves captured in war. Zompanco exported maize, chilies, honey and turkeys to the Pacific coast in exchange for cacao. Salt and cotton were also imported, the former from the coast and nearby settlements. There were copper, gold and silver mines nearby in the early colonial period, and at least some of them date back to before the conquest. The ruler of Zompanco, referred to as a "general", organized agricultural and military activities, and the latter was mainly aimed at the Yope people to the south, likely at the behest of the Aztec overlords.

== Geography ==
The city is located in the Sierra Madre del Sur mountains, at an altitude of 1,092 meters (3,583 feet).

It is on Mexican Federal Highway 95 (Mexico City-Acapulco Highway), about 8 miles (13 km) northeast of the Guerrero state capital city of Chilpancingo

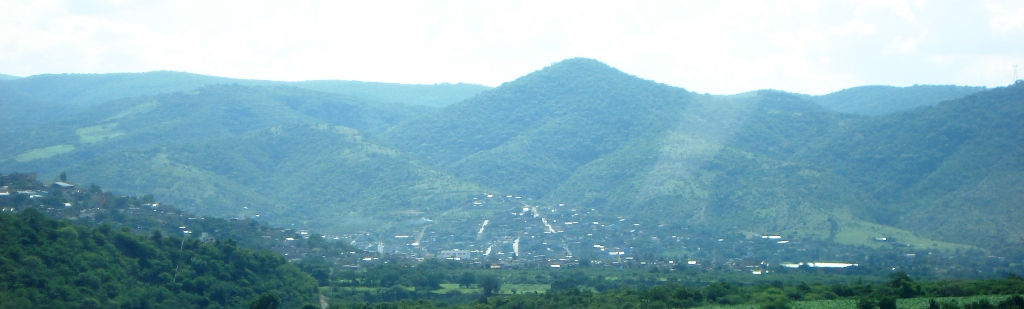
The city and the Sierra Madre del Sur mountains

=== Climate ===
Climate data for Zumpango del Río (1951–2010)
Month	Jan	Feb	Mar	Apr	May	Jun	Jul	Aug	Sep	Oct	Nov	Dec	Year
Record high °C (°F)	34.0 (93.2)	37.0 (98.6)	40.0 (104.0)	42.0 (107.6)	44.0 (111.2)	42.0 (107.6)	41.0 (105.8)	41.0 (105.8)	36.0 (96.8)	36.0 (96.8)	39.0 (102.2)	35.0 (95.0)	44.0 (111.2)
Mean daily maximum °C (°F)	29.1 (84.4)	30.9 (87.6)	33.5 (92.3)	35.2 (95.4)	34.9 (94.8)	32.7 (90.9)	31.6 (88.9)	31.3 (88.3)	30.2 (86.4)	30.3 (86.5)	29.7 (85.5)	28.7 (83.7)	31.5 (88.7)
Daily mean °C (°F)	21.6 (70.9)	23.1 (73.6)	25.6 (78.1)	27.3 (81.1)	27.5 (81.5)	26.1 (79.0)	25.2 (77.4)	25.0 (77.0)	24.3 (75.7)	24.0 (75.2)	22.5 (72.5)	21.3 (70.3)	24.5 (76.1)
Mean daily minimum °C (°F)	14.2 (57.6)	15.3 (59.5)	17.7 (63.9)	19.3 (66.7)	20.0 (68.0)	19.4 (66.9)	18.7 (65.7)	18.7 (65.7)	18.5 (65.3)	17.7 (63.9)	15.3 (59.5)	13.9 (57.0)	17.4 (63.3)
Record low °C (°F)	1.0 (33.8)	8.0 (46.4)	11.0 (51.8)	13.0 (55.4)	14.0 (57.2)	10.0 (50.0)	11.0 (51.8)	10.0 (50.0)	14.0 (57.2)	12.0 (53.6)	7.0 (44.6)	2.0 (35.6)	1.0 (33.8)
Average precipitation mm (inches)	11.6 (0.46)	5.7 (0.22)	3.7 (0.15)	7.4 (0.29)	37.4 (1.47)	126.7 (4.99)	143.3 (5.64)	138.4 (5.45)	137.3 (5.41)	54.9 (2.16)	25.2 (0.99)	14.8 (0.58)	706.4 (27.81)
Average precipitation days (≥ 0.1 mm)	1.2	0.6	0.6	0.9	3.9	12.5	15.5	15.3	15.6	6.2	2.0	1.5	75.8
Source: Servicio Meteorologico Nacional

== See also ==
- Populated places in Guerrero
