= Verónica Escobar Romo =

Mexican lawyer and politician

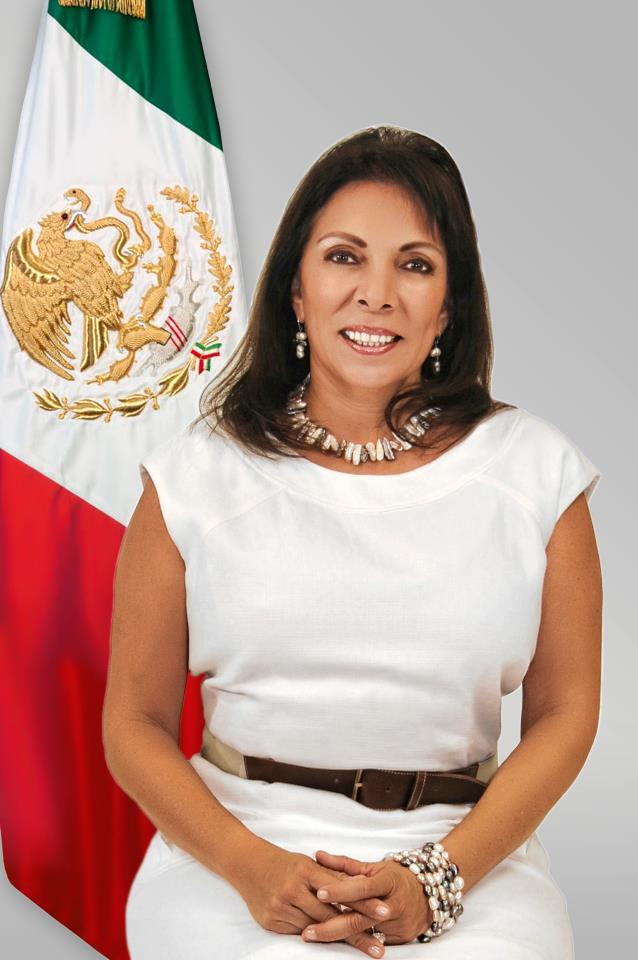

Mayor of Acapulco
- In office 24 March 2012 – 30 September 2012
- Preceded by: Manuel Añorve Baños
- Succeeded by: Luis Walton

Personal details
- Born: 15 December 1955 (age 70) Mexico City, Mexico
- Party: PRI
- Education: Universidad Autónoma Metropolitana

Verónica Escobar Romo (born 15 December 1955) is a Mexican lawyer and politician from the Institutional Revolutionary Party. In 2012 she served as Mayor of Acapulco succeeding Manuel Añorve Baños.

== See also ==
- List of mayors of Acapulco (municipality)
