= List of municipal presidents of Chilpancingo de los Bravo =

Following is a list of municipal presidents of Chilpancingo, capital city of the Mexican state of Guerrero:

Municipal president	Term	Political party	Notes
Carlos Rubio	04-1879–04-1879		
Silvestre Guevara	25-04-1879–05-09-1879		
Luciano Calvo	05-09-1879–22-11-1879		
N/A	1880		
N/A	1881		
José María Cabañas	02-01-1882–07-02-1882		
Carlos Bravo	07-01-1883–15-01-1883		
Juan Cruz Manjarrez	16-01-1883–02-08-1883		
Francisco Argüelles	03-08-1883–02-02-1884		
Carlos Marquina Romero	03-01-1884–19-05-1884		
Daniel L. Cassy	20-05-1884–12-08-1884		
Rafael A. Campos Leyva	13-08-1884–31-12-1884		
Tedercio Herrera Bravo	02-01-1885–02-12-1885		
Manuel Cabañas	23-12-1885–10-01-1886		
Carlos Bravo	11-01-1886–14-05-1886		
Manuel Vega Catalán	15-06-1886–17-06-1886		
Alberto Morlet	18-06-1886–28-12-1886		
N/A	1887		
N/A	1888		
Juan A. Rodríguez	06-07-1889–19-09-1889		
Julio Enríquez	20-09-1889–31-12-1889		
José María Villamar	10-01-1890–04-04-1891		
N/A	05-04-1891–31-12-1891		
N/A	1892		
Francisco Meléndez	28-01-1893–19-05-1894		
Francisco Ortega Martínez	26-05-1984–31-12-1894		
Leobardo Parra y Castro	01-01-1895–25-04-1895		
Francisco Ortega Martínez	26-04-1895–20-01-1897		
Ignacio Calvo Leyva	21-01-1897–11-12-1898		
Manuel Vega Villamar	12-12-1898–08-05-1899		
Francisco Meléndez	09-05-1899–31-12-1899		
Manuel Herrera	01-01-1900–31-12-1900		
Pascual Ortega	01-01-1901–20-01-1901		
Manuel Herrera	21-01-1901–31-12-1901		
Daniel Cassy	01-01-1902–25-04-1903		
Teodoro S. Cabañas	26-04-1903–31-12-1903		
Cástulo Salazar	01-01-1904–31-12-1904		
Aurelio Catalán Ceballos	01-01-1905–31-12-1905		
Pascual Sánchez Pérez	01-01-1906–29-12-1906		
Ángel María Reyes	26-05-1907–31-12-1907		
Carlos Guevara Alarcón	01-01-1908–26-10-1908		
Francisco Ortega	27-10-1908–01-12-1908		
Antonio Carreto	03-12-1908–31-12-1908		
Pascual Sánchez Pérez	01-01-1909–31-12-1909		
Tomás Moreno	01-01-1910–15-01-1910		
Francisco Meléndez	16-01-1910–03-03-1910		
Manuel Olea Daza	04-03-1910–31-12-1910		
Rómulo Martínez Rodríguez	25-02-1911–10-05-1911		
Emigdio E. Martínez	11-05-1911–20-05-1911		
Ramón Z. Martínez	21-05-1911–11-07-1911		
Ignacio Viguri	02-08-1911–01-02-1912		
Alejandro Castañón	02-02-1912–28-02-1912		
Rafael D. Alarcón	02-03-1912–31-12-1913		
Francisco D. Celis	01-01-1914–15-03-1914		
Silvestre Memije	02-04-1914–15-10-1914		
Mauro Ruano	16-10-1914–31-12-1914		
José Antonio Alarcón	01-01-1915–24-01-1915		
Benjamín Muñiz	25-01-1915–30-01-1915		
Daniel Cassy	05-02-1915–02-06-1915		
Ignacio Viguri	03-06-1915–08-07-1915		
José Calvo	09-07-1915–28-08-1915		
Rómulo Martínez Rodríguez	13-09-1915–28-09-1915		
José Alarcón Sevilla	01-01-1916–31-12-1916		
N/A	1917		
Francisco Celis	1918–1919		
Benjamín Muñiz	1920		
Ambrosio Calvo	1921		
Susano Vega Escobar	1922		
Arnulfo Escobar	1923		
Alfredo Guillén	1924		
Manuel A. Somoza	01-01-1925–20-03-1925		
Rafael Aponte	21-03-1925–31-12-1925		
N/A	1926		
Florencio Salazar	01-01-1927–08-02-1927		
Mateo Arcos	09-02-1927–10-02-1927		
Juan Peralta	11-02-1927–31-12-1927		
Juan Jiménez Sánchez	01-01-1928–08-03-1928		
Pablo Alejandro Longi	09-03-1928–31-03-1928		
Antonio Montaño	01-04-1928–31-12-1928		
Florencio Salazar	01-01-1929–28-02-1929		
Lucio Bello Núñez	01-03-1929–25-05-1929		
Feliciano Alarcón Alarcón	26-05-1929–31-12-1929	PNR	
Carlos Vélez	1930	PNR	
Alejandro Longi	1931	PNR	
Antonio Campos Marquina	10-01-1932–25-06-1932	PNR	
Domitilo Adame Fuentes	02-08-1932–29-11-1932	PNR	
Pablo Alejandro Longi	30-11-1932–31-12-1932	PNR	
Alejandro Delgado	01-01-1933–15-04-1933	PNR	
Leonardo Vázquez	16-04-1933–04-11-1933	PNR	
Juan Jiménez Sánchez	1934	PNR	
Enrique Vega Alarcón	1935	PNR	
Aurora Meza Andraca	01-01-1936–22-03-1937	PNR	
Rafael Alarcón	23-03-1937–31-12-1938	PNR	
Benjamín Méndez Bonilla	01-01-1939–09-11-1940	PRM	
Apolinar Memije	10-11-1940–31-12-1940	PRM	Acting municipal president
Teófanes Adame	02-01-1941–08-03-1942	PRM	
Fernando Ríos Neri	09-03-1942–31-12-1942	PRM	
Abel Estrada Lobato	01-01-1943–31-12-1944	PRM	
Julio Calva Capetillo	01-01-1945–31-12-1946	PRM	
Emilio Cabrera Alarcón	01-01-1947–25-08-1948	PRI	
Enrique Vega Alarcón	26-08-1948–31-12-1948	PRI	Acting municipal president
Julio Calva Capetillo	01-01-1949–31-12-1950	PRI	
Abel Estrada Lobato	01-01-1951–15-10-1952	PRI	
Josafat Acevedo Rodríguez	16-10-1952–31-12-1952	PRI	Acting municipal president
Domingo Adame Vega	01-01-1953–23-07-1954	PRI	
Rodrigo Vega Leyva	24-07-1954–31-12-1954	PRI	Acting municipal president
Guillermo Muñiz Carbajal	01-01-1955–31-12-1956	PRI	
Carlos Gómez Romero	01-01-1957–31-12-1959	PRI	
Rodrigo Vega Leyva	1960	PRI	
Constantino Flores Peña	1961	PRI	
Carlos Catalán Ruiz	1962	PRI	
Elías Naime Némer	1963–1965	PRI	
Ausencio Garzón Chávez	1966–1968	PRI	
Darío Miranda Román	1969–1971	PRI	
Elías Naime Némer	1972–1974	PRI	
Juan Alarcón Hernández	1975–1977	PRI	
Magdalena Vázquez de Huicochea	1978–1980	PRI	
Carlos León Román	1981–1983	PRI	
Alberto Saavedra Ramos	1984–1986	PRI	
Florencio Salazar Adame	01-01-1987–10-1989	PRI	
Jorge Arrieta Jiménez	10-1989–31-12-1989	PRI	Acting municipal president
Efrén Leyva Acevedo	1990–1993		
Jorge León Robledo	1994–1996		
Roberto Torres Aguirre	1996		
Héctor Astudillo Flores	1996–1998	PRI	
Reyes Betancourt Linares	1998	PRI	Acting municipal president
José Luis Peralta Lobato	1999–2002	PRI	
Saúl Alarcón Abarca	2002–2005	PRI; PVEM	
Mario Moreno Arcos	2005–2008	PRI	
Héctor Astudillo Flores	01-01-2009–02-04-2012	PRI	Applied for a leave
Tulio Samuel Pérez Calvo	03-04-2012–30-09-2012	PRI	Acting municipal president
Mario Moreno Arcos	01-10-2012–30-09-2015	PRI	
Marco Antonio Leyva Mena	01-10-2015–10-2017	PRI; PVEM	Coalition PRI-PVEM. Applied for a leave
Jesús Tejeda Leyva	10-2017–06-2018	PRI; PVEM	Coalition PRI-PVEM. Acting municipal president
Marco Antonio Leyva Mena	06-2018–30-09-2018	PRI; PVEM	Coalition PRI-PVEM. Reinstated by decision of the Supreme Court of Justice of the Nation
Antonio Gaspar Beltrán	01-10-2018–30-09-2021	PAN; PRD; MC	
Norma Otilia Hernández Martínez	01-10-2021–30-09-2024	Morena	
Alejandro Arcos Catalán	01-10-2024–06-10-2024	PAN; PRI; PRD	Coalition "Fuerza y Corazón por México" (Strength and Heart for Mexico). Assassinated six days after assuming office
Gustavo Alarcón Herrera	07-10-2024–	PAN	Acting municipal president
