= 1821 in Mexico =

- Decades: 1800s; 1810s; 1820s; 1830s; 1840s
- See also: History of Mexico; List of years in Mexico; Timeline of Mexican history

Events in the year 1821 in Mexico.

== Incumbents ==
- Regent-Agustín de Iturbide

== Events ==
- February 24 – Army of the Three Guarantees formed
- August 24 – Mexico gains its independence from Spain from ratifying the Treaty of Córdoba.
- September 28 – The Declaration of Independence of the Mexican Empire is ratified.
- September 29 – Agustín de Iturbide is proclaimed as the President of the Regency.

== Deaths ==
- Maria Fermina Rivera, Heroine of Mexican War of Independence (exact date unknown)
