= Tlacotepec =

City in the Mexican state of Guerrero

- Municipal seat and city
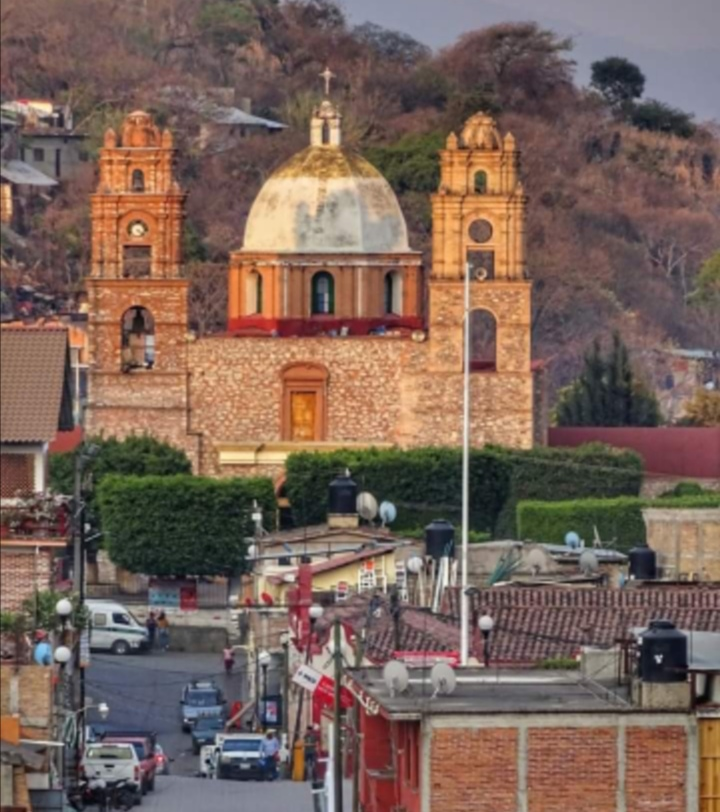
- Church of St. James the Apostle in Tlacotepec

- Location in Mexico Tlacotepec (Mexico)
- Coordinates: 17°46′N 99°59′W
- Country: Mexico
- State: Guerrero
- Municipality: General Heliodoro Castillo
- Time zone: UTC-6 (Zona Centro)

Tlacotepec is a city in the southern Mexican state of Guerrero. It serves as the seat of the municipality of General Heliodoro Castillo.

Tlacotepec is home to many ranchos, such as Aguacate, El Limoncito, Huautla, Ojo de Agua, Tepehuaje, Tiquimil, Chichiltepec, Tepetlapa, Los Naranjos (El Amatito del Naranjo), Pelón Xóchitl, La Cucaracha (La Guadalupe), Las Piñas, and many more.

In the early 20th century, a local official by the name of Navidad Paco recorded prehispanic oral traditions describing the foundation of Tlacotepec. According to legend, the first settlers of Tlacotepec came from Tixtlancingo on the Costa Grande. They first went to Pueblo Viejo, then to El Naranjo. From El Naranjo, they sent two chiefs to explore to the north, who found a valley called Ixtlahuaca containing many springs, which they named Cupengo, Popotzonitzi Atl, Atlmolonga, and Yei Atl. The founders of Tlacotepec itself were two men named Hueytlacatl and Ixquitotzin. They first came to the hill called Totoltepec to the north of modern Tlacotepec. They slept there, but when Hueytlacatl woke he had fallen ill. Ixquitotzin returned to the tribe and brought them to the hill, where they found Hueytlacatl transformed into a winged serpent. He told the tribe that this would be their home, but confessed he was afraid of eating them, and flew toward Iguala and formed the Lake of Tuxpan.
