= Jorge Salgado Parra =

Mexican politician

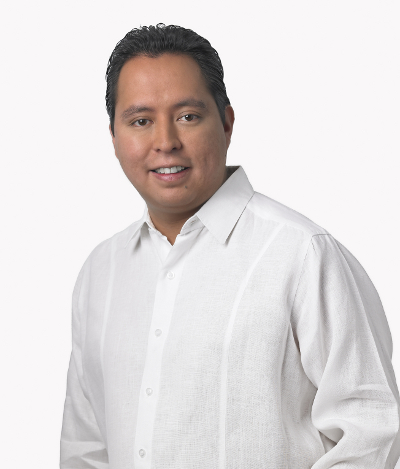
- Jorge Salgado Parra in 2011

Deputy to the Congress of the Union from Guerrero
- In office 1 September 2012 – 31 August 2015

Personal details
- Born: 28 October 1979 (age 46) Chilpancingo, Guerrero, Mexico
- Party: PRD

Jorge Salgado Parra (born 28 October 1979) is a Mexican politician affiliated with the Party of the Democratic Revolution (PRD). In the 2012 general election he was elected to the Chamber of Deputies to represent the seventh district of Guerrero during the 62nd Congress.
