= César Flores Maldonado =

Mexican economist and politician

- Born: 28 February 1963 (age 63); Petatlán, Guerrero, Mexico
- Education: National Autonomous University of Mexico
- Occupations: Economist and politician
- Political party: PRI (1980s–2006; 2008–present); PRD (2006–2008)

César Flores Maldonado (born 28 February 1963) is a Mexican economist and politician affiliated with the Institutional Revolutionary Party (PRI) who formerly belonged to the Party of the Democratic Revolution (PRD). In the 2006 general election he was elected to the Chamber of Deputies to represent the ninth district of Guerrero for the PRD.
