= Lourdes Gallardo Pérez =

Mexican politician

- Born: 11 February 1938 (age 88); Chilpancingo, Guerrero, Mexico
- Occupation: Politician
- Political party: PRI

Lourdes Gallardo Pérez (born 11 February 1938) is a Mexican politician from the Institutional Revolutionary Party (PRI). From 2002 to 2003 she served in the Chamber of Deputies representing the seventh district of Guerrero as the substitute of Heriberto Huicochea Vázquez, who resigned his seat on 19 August 2022.
