= Pierre Merlin =

French artist and musician

Pierre Merlin (1918 – 2000) was a French artist and jazz musician known for designing the cover art of over 150 albums.

== Life and career ==
Merlin was born in Bordeaux in 1918. He studied at the École Municipale des Beaux-Arts before receiving a scholarship to study fine art in Paris in 1942. It was there that Merlin began performing New Orleans style jazz eventually playing with Claude Luter and Sidney Bechet. Merlin alternated between the cornet and the trumpet.

In the 1940s, Merlin did graphic design work for Hot Club de France. His first sketches of jazz musicians were done at the 1948 Festival of Nice. From 1950 to 1953, Merlin worked designing the album artwork for the Vogue and Swing record labels. The record labels would give Merlin very little information about the album he was working on. This was often just the title of the record, song title and photographs. His work was influenced by the designer David Stone Martin.

He died in Paris in 2000.

== Discography ==
With High Society Jazz Band:

- High Society Jazz Band (CED, 1964)
- 5 ieme Jazz Band Ball (Pragmaphone, 1969)
- Jazz chez Bofinger (RCA, 1972)
- 'Lasses candy (Stomp Off, 1987)

With Claude Luter:

- Claude Luter et ses Lorientals (1946)
- Claude Luter et ses Lorientals (Blue Star, 1948)
- Claude Luter et son Orchestre (Duc Thomson, 1949)
