= Maria Fermina Rivera =

María Fermina Rivera was an insurgent in the Mexican War of Independence where she was a part of Vicente Guerrero's small force. Rivera was born in Tlaltizapán, in what today is the state of Morelos. In 1821, Rivera accompanied her husband into combat on the front line with Guerrero’s forces and continued fighting for independence throughout the last years of the war.

She may have been killed in action while fighting in Guerrero’s army in Chichihualco, Guerrero, in February, 1821, although another source states that she sued the government of the First Mexican Empire for an increase in her pension in 1823 and the date of her death is unknown.
