= Luis Walton =

Mexican politician (1949–2023)

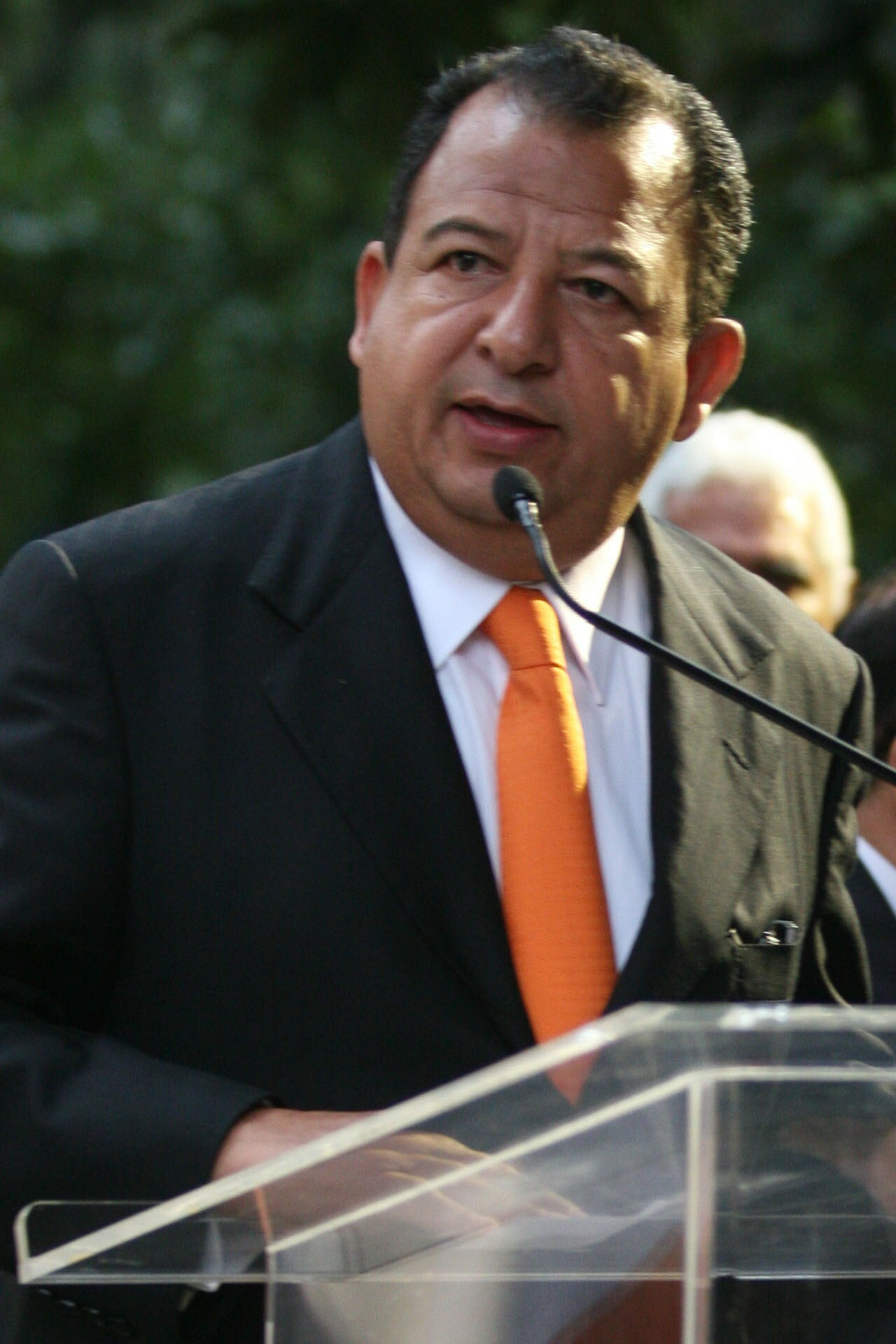

Municipal president of Acapulco
- In office 1 October 2012 – 26 January 2015
- Preceded by: Verónica Escobar Romo
- Succeeded by: Luis Uruñuela Fey

Personal details
- Born: 1 June 1949 Acapulco, Mexico
- Died: 20 May 2023 (aged 73) Acapulco, Mexico
- Party: MC
- Website: http://www.luiswalton.com/

Luis Walton Aburto (1 June 1949 – 20 May 2023) was a Mexican politician affiliated with the Convergence. From 2012 to 2015, he acted as Municipal President of Acapulco. He previously served as Senator of the LX and LXI Legislatures of the Mexican Congress representing Guerrero and as President of the Convergence between 2010 and 2011.

Walton died on 20 May 2023, at the age of 73.
