= Mochitlán (municipality) =

Municipality in the Mexican state of Guerrero

- Municipality
- Location in Mexico
- Coordinates: 17°10′N 99°14′W
- Country: Mexico
- State: Guerrero
- Municipal seat: Mochitlán

Area
  - Total: 577.5 km^{2} (223.0 sq mi)

Population (2005)
  - Total: 10,709

Mochitlán is a municipality in the Mexican state of Guerrero. The municipal seat lies at Mochitlán. The municipality covers an area of 577.5 km^{2}.

In 2005, the municipality had a total population of 10,709.
