= René Juárez Cisneros =

Mexican politician (1956–2021)

Federal Deputy in the Chamber of Deputies
- In office 1 September 2018 – 26 July 2021

53rd President of the Institutional Revolutionary Party
- In office 2 May 2018 – 16 July 2018
- Preceded by: Enrique Ochoa Reza
- Succeeded by: Claudia Ruiz Massieu

Senator of the Senate of the Republic
- In office 1 September 2012 – 5 October 2016
- Preceded by: Antelmo Alvarado García
- Succeeded by: Esteban Albarrán Mendoza

Governor of Guerrero
- In office 1 April 1999 – 31 March 2005
- Preceded by: Ángel Aguirre Rivero
- Succeeded by: Zeferino Torreblanca

Deputy for Guerrero's seventh district
- In office 1 September 1994 – 31 August 1997
- Preceded by: Gustavo Ojeda Delgado
- Succeeded by: Gustavo Adolfo Torres Blanco

Municipal president of Acapulco
- In office 1990–1992
- Preceded by: Virgilio Gómez Moharro
- Succeeded by: Antonio Piza Soberanis

Personal details
- Born: 8 June 1956 Acapulco, Guerrero, Mexico
- Died: 26 July 2021 (aged 65) Mexico City, Mexico
- Cause of death: COVID-19
- Resting place: Panteón de La Cruces, Acapulco
- Party: Institutional Revolutionary Party
- Occupation: Politician

René Juárez Cisneros (8 June 1956 – 26 July 2021) was a Mexican economist and politician affiliated with the Institutional Revolutionary Party (PRI).

== Biography ==
Juárez Cisneros was born in the port city of Acapulco, Guerrero, in 1956.

From 1990 to 1993 he was the municipal president of Acapulco. In the 1994 general election he was elected to the Chamber of Deputies to represent the seventh district of Guerrero. He served as governor of Guerrero from 1999 to 2005.

In the 2012 general election he was elected to the Senate for Guerrero for the 2012–2018 term. He returned to the Chamber of Deputies in the 2018 general election as a proportional representation deputy for the fourth electoral region. During that session of Congress he was the coordinator of the PRI's parliamentary group. He was still serving as a deputy at the time of his death.

Cisneros died on 26 July 2021 aged 65, due to complications caused by a COVID-19 infection.

== See also ==
- List of mayors of Acapulco (municipality)
