= Fidel Rubí Huicochea =

Mexican politician

- Born: 24 October 1982 (age 43); Morelos, Mexico
- Occupation: Politician
- Political party: PAN

Fidel Christian Rubí Huicochea (born 24 October 1982) is a Mexican politician from the National Action Party. In 2012, he served as Deputy of the LXI Legislature of the Mexican Congress representing Morelos.
