= General Heliodoro Castillo =

Municipality in the Mexican state of Guerrero

- Municipality
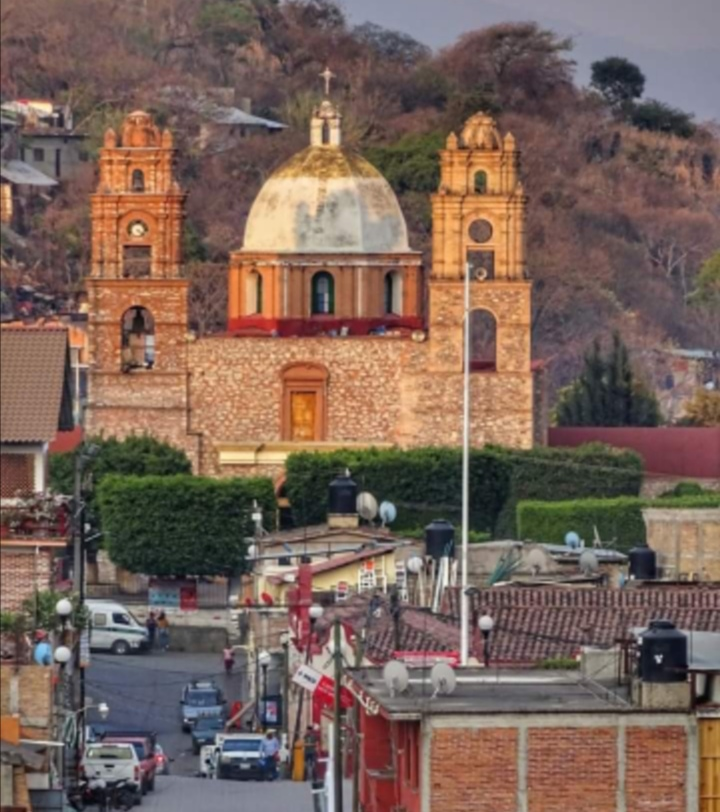
- Church of St. James the Apostle in Tlacotepec

- Location in Mexico
- Coordinates: 17°26′N 99°47′W
- Country: Mexico
- State: Guerrero
- Municipal seat: Tlacotepec

Area
  - Total: 1,613.8 km^{2} (623.1 sq mi)

Population (2005)
  - Total: 34,554
- Time zone: UTC-6 (Zona Centro)
- Website: heliodorocastillo.gob.mx/

General Heliodoro Castillo is a municipality in the southern Mexican state of Guerrero. It is located 34 kilometres from Chilpancingo, the state capital. The municipal seat lies at Tlacotepec.

The municipality covers an area of 1,613.8 km². In 2020, it had a total population of 37,254, up from the 34,554 reported in 2005.

The municipality is named after Heliodoro Castillo (1887–1917), a prominent Zapatista general.
