= Eduardo Neri =

Municipality in the Mexican state of Guerrero

- Municipality
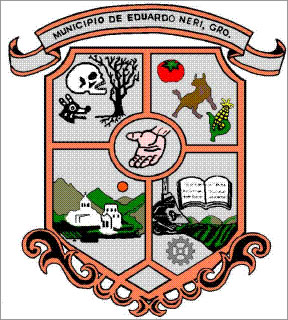
- Coat of arms

- Location in Mexico Eduardo Neri (Mexico)
- Coordinates: 17°36′N 99°38′W
- Country: Mexico
- State: Guerrero
- Municipal seat: Zumpango del Río

Area
  - Total: 1,289.6 km^{2} (497.9 sq mi)

Population (2005)
  - Total: 40,328
- Time zone: UTC-6 (Zona Centro)
- Website: eduardoneri.gob.mx

Eduardo Neri is a municipality in the Mexican state of Guerrero. The municipal capital is Zumpango del Río. The municipality covers an area of 1289.6 km^{2}.

It was named for jurist and congressman Eduardo Neri Reynoso, born in Zumpango.

In 2005, the total population was 40,328.

== Geography ==
=== Towns and villages ===
The municipality has 80 towns/villages. The largest are as follows:

Town/village	Population
Zumpango del Río	24,719
Huitziltepec	4,305
Xochipala	3,120
Mezcala	2,251
Axaxacualco	1,186
Tlanipatla	1,162
Total for Municipality	40,328

The contract for the Canadian-owned mine Los Filos, consisting of 1,500 hectares (3,700 acres) (700 ha of common use and 800 ha owned by 173 ejidatarios was canceled on September 2, 2020. Some 1,300 miners were blocked from entering the site. The ejiidatarios claim that the mining company, Equinox Gold, has racist and discriminatory policies, and that it regularly ignores health and environmental protections. Eight villagers in Carrizalillo died from cancer in 2019, and some babies have been born with deformities related to pollution.

The mavericks claim that the company has had a racist and discriminatory attitude towards the inhabitants and has violated contract clauses related to the protection of health and the environment. Eight villagers died from last year, apparently from cancer and some babies were born with malformations from pollution. Twenty-one miners have been infected by COVID-19. Both the mining company and the landowners have been extorted into monthly payments by local criminal gangs. Section 17 of the Sindicato Nacional de Trabajadores Mineros, Metalúrgicos, Siderúrgicos y Similares de la República Mexicana (mineworkers' union), based in Taxco, has appealed to Governor Héctor Astudillo Flores.
