= Instituto Nacional para el Federalismo y el Desarrollo Municipal =

Decentralised agency of the Mexican federal government

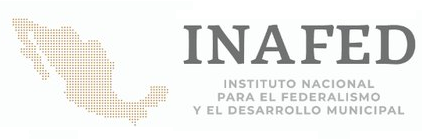

The Instituto Nacional para el Federalismo y el Desarrollo Municipal (National Institute for Federalism and Municipal Development, better known by the acronym INAFED) is a decentralised agency of the Mexican federal government. It has responsibility for promoting the ideals of federalism between the several levels of government in Mexico, by acting to coordinate and implement policies, programmes and services that are designed to strengthen inter-governmental relations between the federal and "subsidiary" levels of governance at the state and municipal levels.

The agency comes under the overall responsibility of the Secretaría de Gobernación (SEGOB), the Secretariat of the Interior, the government department responsible for administering the country's internal affairs.

INAFED was established in July 2002, replacing and expanding upon the role of its predecessor agency, the Centro Nacional de Desarrollo Municipal or CEDEMUN (National Centre for Municipal Development).
