= Evelyn Salgado =

Mexican politician

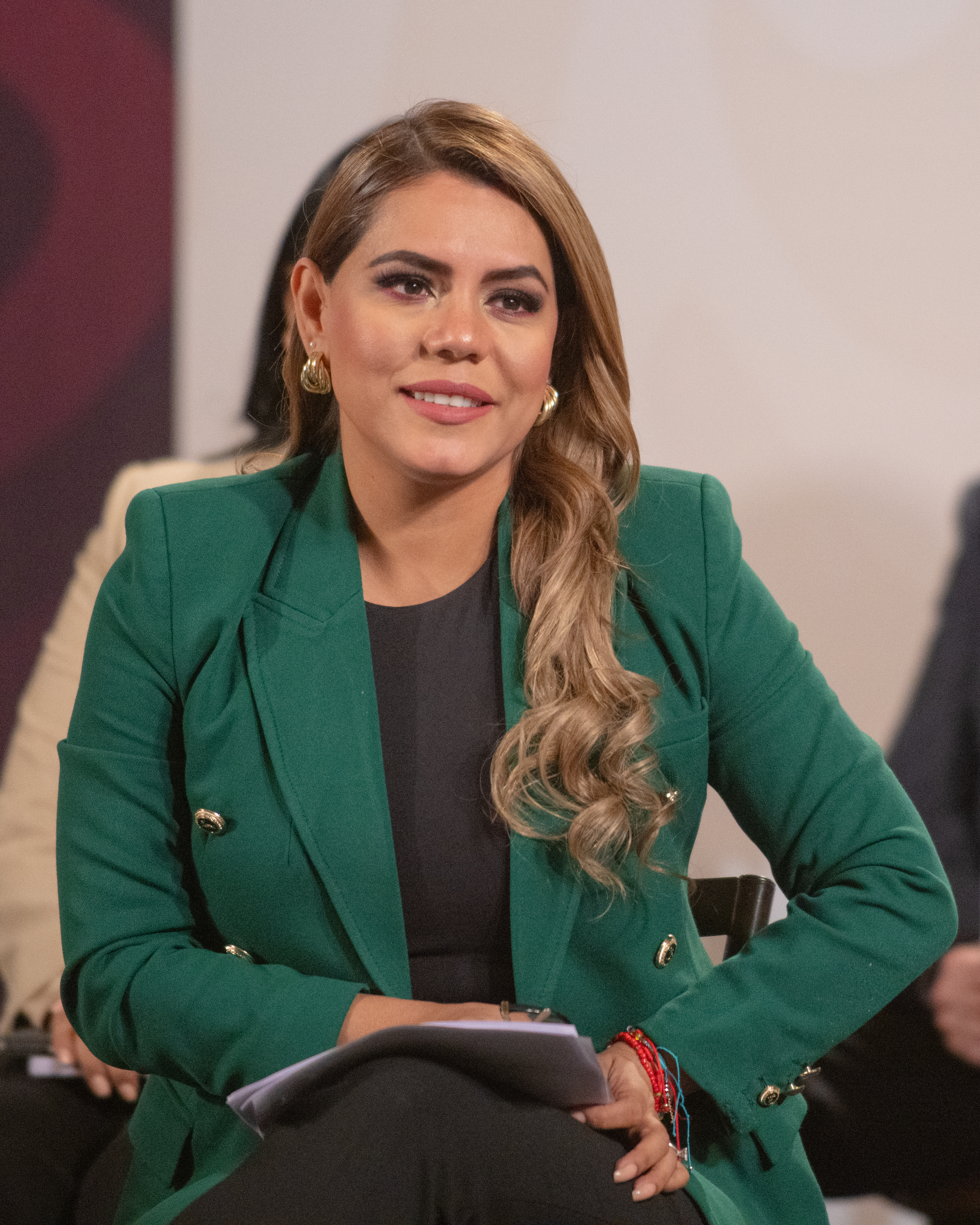
- Evelyn Salgado in 2024

Governor of Guerrero
- Incumbent
- Assumed office 15 October 2021
- Preceded by: Héctor Astudillo Flores

Personal details
- Born: Evelyn Cecilia Salgado Pineda; 5 February 1982 (age 44) Iguala, Guerrero, Mexico
- Party: MORENA (2017- ) Party of the Democratic Revolution (2006-2016)
- Spouse: Alfredo Alonso Bustamante
- Education: Universidad La Salle México

Evelyn Cecilia Salgado Pineda (Guerrero born 5 February 1982) is a Mexican politician affiliated with MORENA. Since 15 October 2021, she is Governor of Guerrero. In May 2021, she became the candidate for the governorship of Guerrero for Morena, on 13 June she obtained a majority certificate from the Electoral and Citizen Participation Institute of Guerrero that accredits her as elected governor of the State. Her father is Senator Félix Salgado Macedonio.
