= Mochitlán =

- Municipal seat and city
- Location in Mexico Mochitlán (Mexico)
- Coordinates: 17°27′N 99°29′W
- Country: Mexico
- State: Guerrero
- Municipality: Mochitlán
- Time zone: UTC-6 (Zona Centro)

Mochitlán is a city and seat of the municipality of Mochitlán, in the Mexican state of Guerrero.

Previously it was called Nochistlán, which in Nahuatl means "Royal Paradise", a name that was changed to Mochitlán.
