= Heriberto Huicochea =

Mexican politician

- Born: 6 August 1962 (age 64); Chilpancingo, Guerrero, Mexico
- Occupation: Politician
- Political party: PRI

Heriberto Huicochea Vázquez (born 6 August 1962) is a Mexican politician from the Institutional Revolutionary Party (PRI). In the 2000 general election he was elected to the Chamber of Deputies to represent the seventh district of Guerrero during the 58th Congress. He resigned his seat on 19 August 2002 and was replaced by his substitute, Lourdes Gallardo Pérez, for the remainder of his term.
