= Tixtla de Guerrero (municipality) =

Municipality in the Mexican state of Guerrero

- Municipality
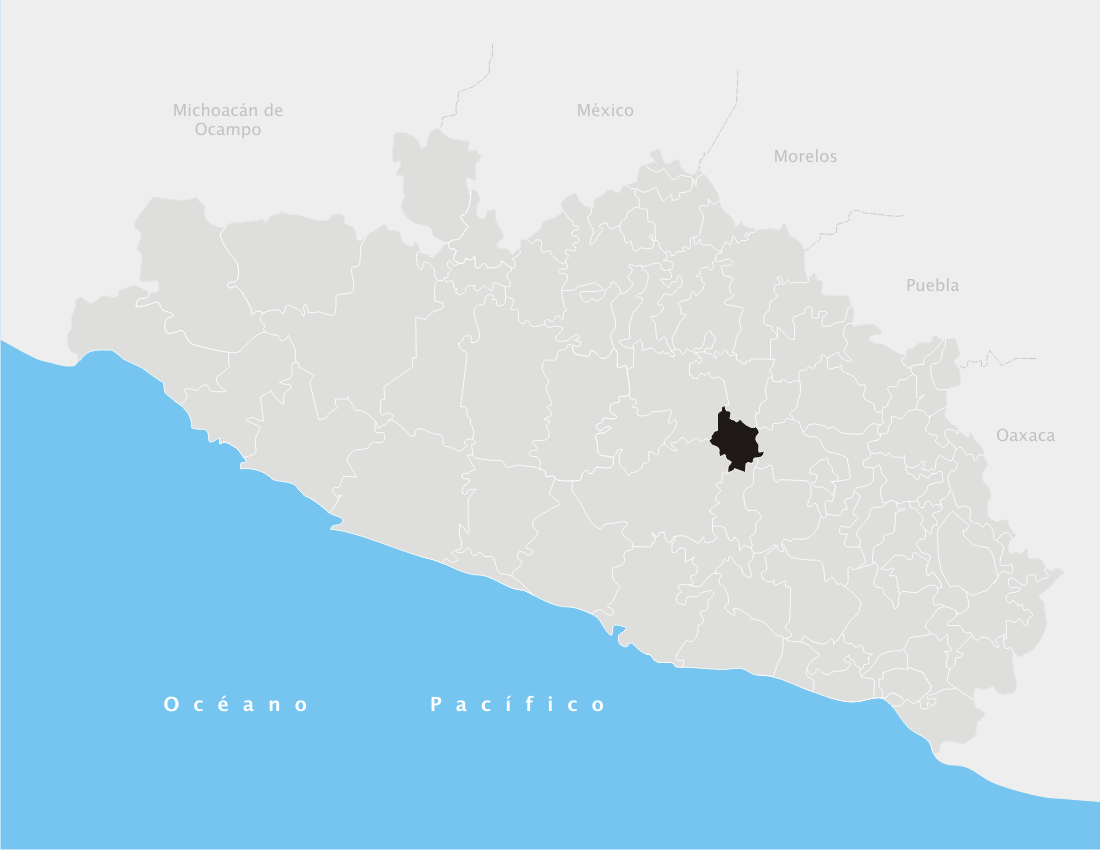
- Municipality of Tixtla de Guerrero in Guerrero

- Location in Mexico
- Coordinates: 17°20′N 99°15′W
- Country: Mexico
- State: Guerrero
- Municipal seat: Tixtla de Guerrero

Area
  - Total: 290 km^{2} (110 sq mi)

Population (2005)
  - Total: 37,300

Tixtla de Guerrero (Spanish: [ˈtiɣstla ðe ɣeˈreɾo], Nahuatl: [ˈtiʃt͡ɬa]) is a municipality in the Mexican state of Guerrero. The municipal seat lies at Tixtla de Guerrero. The municipality covers an area of 290 square kilometres (110 sq mi).

As of 2005, the municipality had a total population of 37,300.

== Geography ==
=== Towns and villages ===
In 2005, the INEGI registered 37 localities in the municipality of Tixtla de Guerrero, these are the largest:

Locality	Population
Total Population	37,300
Tixtla	21,720
Atliaca	7,439
Zoquiapa	1,512
Almolonga	1,220
El Durazno	1,095
Zacatzonapa	796
Chilacachapa	481

== Administration ==
=== Municipal presidents ===
Municipal President	Period
Albino López Catalán	(1969-1971)
Hermenegildo Rodríguez Hernández	(1972-1974)
Vicente Astudillo Alcaraz	(1975-1977)
Román Catalán Bervera	(1978-1980)
Pascual Póctzin Martínez	(1981-1983)
Timoteo Valle Alcaraz	(1984-1986)
Julia Jiménez Alarcón	(1987-1989)
Hugo Cesáreo Astudillo Bello	(1990-1993)
Edelmira Hernández Alcaraz	(1993-1996)
J. Jesús Pastenes Hernández	(1996-1999)
Jorge Vargas Alcaraz	(1999-2002)
Edgardo Astudillo Morales	(2002-2005)
Rogelio Nava Peralta	(2005-2008)
Jorge Luis Campos Espíritu	(2009-2012) Actual Presidente Electo
