= Kilómetro 30 =

Municipality in Acapulco de Juarez, Mexico

- Town
- Location in Mexico Kilómetro 30 (Mexico)
- Coordinates: 16°59′N 99°46′W
- Country: Mexico
- State: Guerrero
- Municipality: Acapulco de Juárez

Population (2014)
  - Total: 6,301
- Time zone: UTC-6 (Zona Centro)

Kilómetro 30 (Spanish: Kilometre 30, lit. 'Kilometer 30') is a community located in Acapulco de Juárez, a municipality in the southern Mexican state of Guerrero. As of 2014, 6,301 people resided in it.

== Geography ==
The community is 19 km (12 mi) from its nearest city, Acapulco. It is 266 m (873 ft) above sea level and has a savannah climate. Temperatures are consistently warm throughout the year, dropping to 22 °C (72 °F) in September and rising to 30 °C (86 °F) in April.
