= Mojica =

Mojica may refer to:

- Francisco Juan Martínez Mojica (born 1963), Spanish microbiologist at the University of Alicante, Spain
- Gualberto Mojica (born 1984), Bolivian footballer
- Johan Mojica (born 1992), Colombian professional footballer who plays for Spanish club Girona FC
- José Adolfo Mojica Morales (1936–2012), the Roman Catholic bishop of Sonsonate, El Salvador
- Jose Manuel Mojica Legarre (born 1955), Spanish writer
- José Mojica Marins (1936–2020), Brazilian filmmaker, actor, screenwriter, TV and media personality
- José Mojica (1896–1974), Mexican Franciscan friar and former tenor and film actor
- Melissa Mojica (born 1983), judoka from Puerto Rico
- Monique Mojica, Canadian playwright, director, and actor
- Vilmarie Mojica (born 1985), female volleyball player from Puerto Rico
- Vinia Mojica, singer from Queens, New York
