= List of municipal presidents of Acapulco =

The following is a list of municipal presidents of Acapulco de Juárez municipality in the state of Guerrero, Mexico.

Municipal president	Term	Political party	Notes
Ricardo Morlett Sutter	01-01-1963–31-12-1965	PRI	
Martín Heredia Merckley	01-01-1966–31-12-1968	PRI	
Israel Nogueda Otero	01-01-1969–1971	PRI	
Antonio Trani Zapata	1971–1972	PRI	Acting municipal president
Israel Hernández Ramos	1972–1974	PRI	
Ismael Andraca Navarrete	1975	PRI	Acting municipal president
Virgilio Gómez Moharro	1975–31-12-1977	PRI	Acting municipal president
Febronio Díaz Figueoa	01-01-1978–31-12-1980	PRI	
Amín Zarur Ménez	01-01-1981–31-12-1983	PRI	
Alfonso Argudín Alcaraz	01-01-1984–31-12-1986	PRI	
Israel Soberanis Nogueda	01-01-1987–1989	PRI	
Virgilio Gómez Moharro	1989–31-12-1989	PRI	Acting municipal president
René Juárez Cisneros	01-01-1990–1992	PRI	
Antonio Piza Soberanis	1992–1993	PRI	
Rogelio de la O Almazán	1993–1996	PRI	
Juan Salgado Tenorio	1996	PRI	
Manuel Añorve Baños	01-01-1997–1998	PRI	
César Varela Blanco	1998	PRI	Acting municipal president
Manuel Añorve Baños	1998–1999	PRI	Resumed
Ana María Castilleja Mendieta	1999–31-03-1999	PRI	Acting municipal president
Zeferino Torreblanca	01-04-1999–31-03-2002	PRD	
Alberto López Rosas	01-04-2002–31-12-2005	PRD	
Félix Salgado Macedonio	01-01-2006–2008	PRD	Applied for a leave
César Zambrano Pérez	2008–31-12-2008	PRD	Acting municipal president
Manuel Añorve Baños	01-01-2009–08-02-2010	PRI	Applied for a temporary leave
Alejandro Porcayo Rivera	2010	PRI	Acting municipal president
José Luis Ávila Sánchez	2010–10-02-2011	PRI	Acting municipal president
Manuel Añorve Baños	10-02-2011–24-03-2012	PRI	Resumed. Applied for a second leave
Verónica Escobar Romo	24-03-2012–30-09-2012	PRI	Acting municipal president
Luis Walton Aburto	01-10-2012–26-01-2015	MC	Applied for a leave
Luis Uruñuela Fey	26-01-2015–30-09-2015	MC	Acting municipal president
Evodio Velázquez Aguirre	01-10-2015–30-09-2018	PRD	
Adela Román Ocampo	01-10-2018–30-09-2021	Morena	
Abelina López Rodríguez	01-10-2021–30-09-2024	Morena	
Abelina López Rodríguez	01-10-2024–	PT; PVEM; Morena	Coalition "Sigamos Haciendo Historia"; She was reelected
