= Chilpancingo de los Bravo (municipality) =

Municipality in the Mexican state of Guerrero

- Municipality
- Coat of arms

- Location within Guerrero Location within Mexico
- Coordinates: 17°11′N 99°29′W
- Country: Mexico
- State: Guerrero
- Municipal seat: Chilpancingo

Government
  - Municipal President: Gustavo Alarcón Herrera (PAN)
  - Federal electoral district: Guerrero's 7th

Area
  - Total: 2,338.4 km^{2} (902.9 sq mi)

Population (2005)
  - Total: 214,219
- Time zone: UTC−6 (Zona Centro)

Chilpancingo de los Bravo is a municipality in the Mexican state of Guerrero. The municipal seat is Chilpancingo de los Bravo.

== Geography ==
The municipality is within the Sierra Madre del Sur mountain range. It covers an area of 2,338.4 square kilometres (902.9 mi^{2}).

As of 2005, the municipality had a total population of 214,219.

=== Towns and villages ===
The municipality has 114 localities. The largest are as follows:

| Locality | Population |
|---|---|
| Total Municipio | 214,219 |
| Chilpancingo de los Bravo | 166,796 |
| Petaquillas | 7,627 |
| Ocotito | 6,212 |
| Mazatlán | 4,599 |
| Jaleaca de Catalán (Note: Jaleaca became Jaleaca de Catalán by decree 15 of 3 June 1889 in honour of the brave offer of Antonia Nava de Catalán in offering to sacrifice herself during the Mexican War of Independence.) | 2,578 |
| Palo Blanco | 2,288 |
| Julián Blanco | 1,956 |
