= Leonardo Bravo (municipality) =

Municipality in the Mexican state of Guerrero

- Municipality
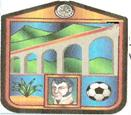
- Coat of arms

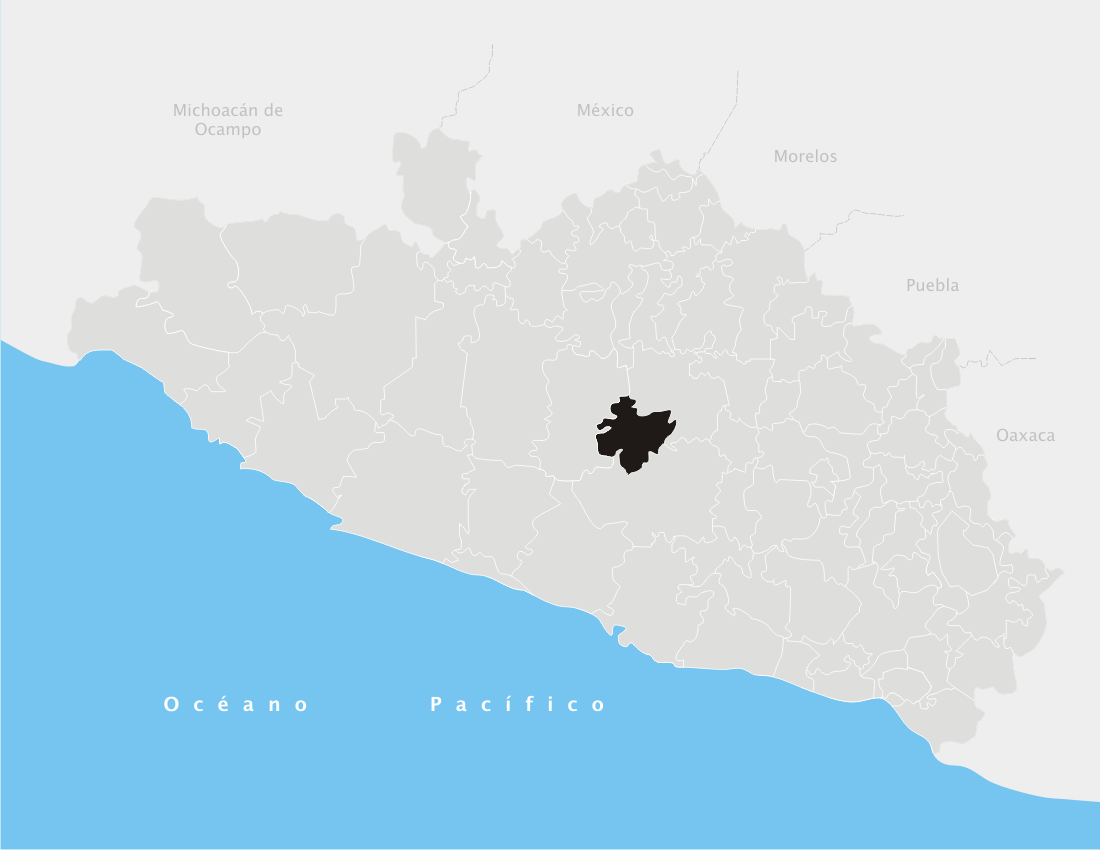
- Municipality of Leonardo Bravo in Guerrero

- Location in Mexico
- Coordinates: 17°33′N 99°34′W
- Country: Mexico
- State: Guerrero
- Municipal seat: Chichihualco

Area
  - Total: 852 km^{2} (329 sq mi)

Population (2005)
  - Total: 22,982

Leonardo Bravo is a municipality in the Mexican state of Guerrero. The municipal seat lies at Chichihualco. The municipality covers an area of 852 km^{2}.

In 2005, the municipality had a total population of 22,982.
