= List of governors of Guerrero =

Governor of Guerrero

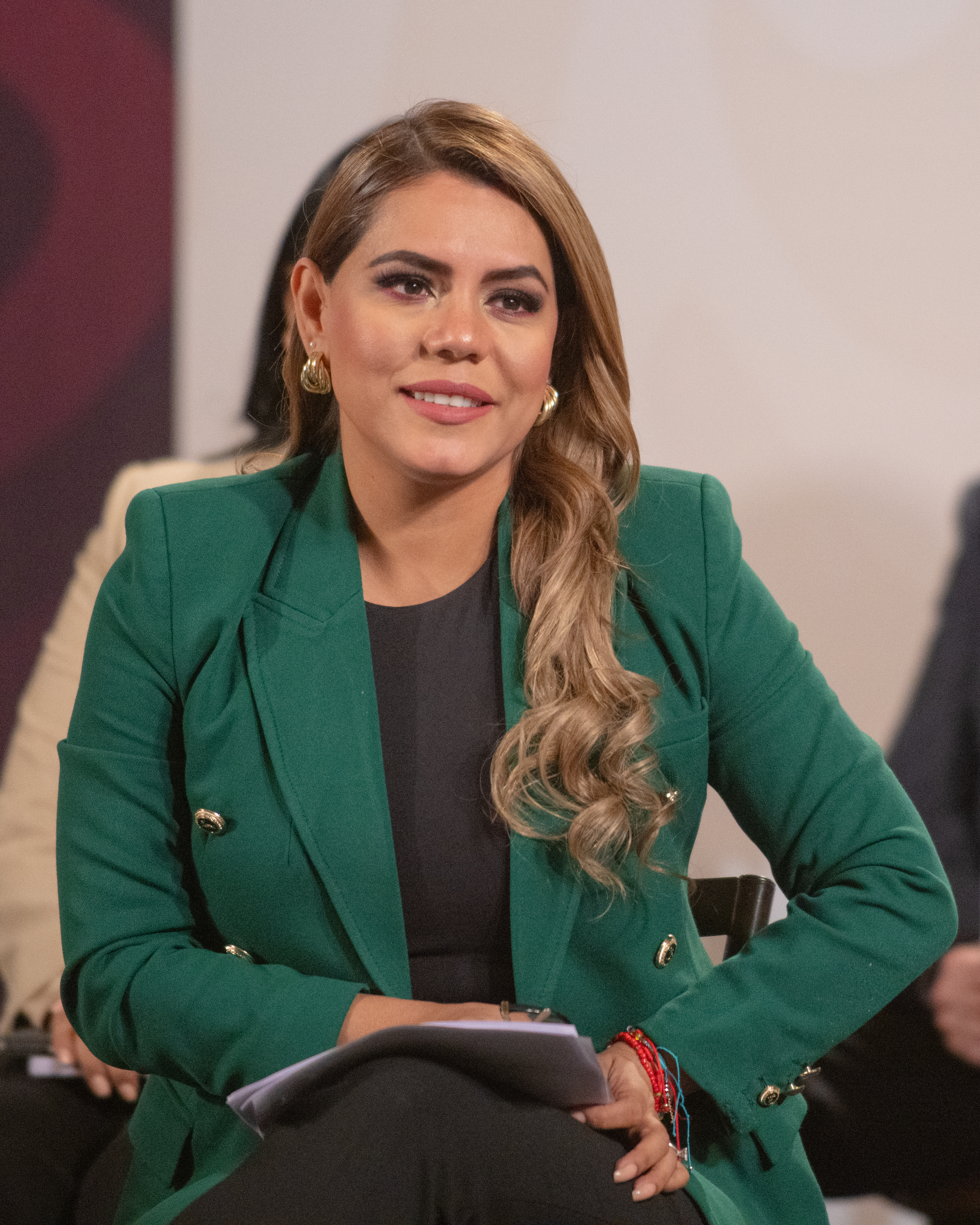
- Incumbent; Evelyn Salgado Pineda since October 15, 2021
- Term length: Six years, non-renewable.

List of governors of Guerrero since it became a state of Mexico in 1917.

Name	Party	Term
Evelyn Salgado Pineda	MORENA	(2021–present)
Héctor Astudillo Flores	PRI	(2015–2021)
Rogelio Ortega Martínez	PRD	Interim (2014–2015)
Ángel Aguirre Rivero	PRD	(2011–2014)
Zeferino Torreblanca	PRD	(2005–2011)
René Juárez Cisneros	PRI	(1999–2005)
Ángel Aguirre Rivero	PRI	Interim (1996–1999)
Rubén Figueroa Alcocer	PRI	demoted after Aguas Blancas case (1993–1996)
José Francisco Ruiz Massieu	PRI	(1987–1993)
Alejandro Cervantes Delgado	PRI	(1981–1987)
Rubén Figueroa Figueroa	PRI	(1975–1981)
Xavier Olea Muñoz	PRI	(1975–1975)
Israel Nogueda Otero	PRI	(1971–1975)
Roberto Rodríguez Mercado	PRI	(1971–1971)
Caritino Maldonado Pérez	PRI	(1969–1971) (died in office)
Raymundo Abarca Alarcón	PRI	(1963–1969)
Arturo Martínez Adame	PRI	(1961–1963)
Raúl Caballero Aburto	PRI	(1957–1961)
Darío L. Arrieta Mateos	PRI	(1954–1957)
Alejandro Gómez Maganda	PRI	(1951–1954)
Baltazar R. Leyva Mancilla	Party of the Mexican Revolution, PRM	(1945–1951)
Gerardo R. Catalán Calvo	PRM	(1941–1945)
Carlos F. Carranco	PRM	(1941–1941)
Alberto F. Berber	National Revolutionary Party, PNR	(1937–1941)
José Inocente Lugo	PNR	(1935–1937)
Gabriel R. Guevara	PNR	(1933–1935)
Adrián Castrejón	PNR	(1928–1933)
Enrique Martínez		(1928–1928)
Héctor F. López		(1925–1928)
Francisco Figueroa Mata		(1917–1925)

== See also ==
- List of Mexican state governors
