= Héctor Astudillo Flores =

Mexican lawyer and politician

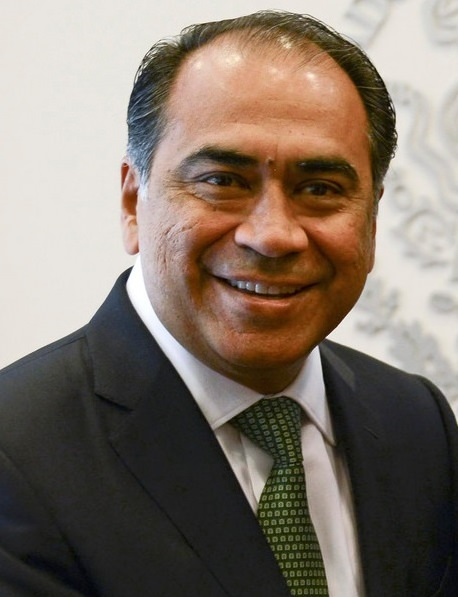

Governor of Guerrero
- In office 27 October 2015 – 14 October 2021
- Preceded by: Rogelio Ortega Martínez
- Succeeded by: Evelyn Salgado Pineda

Personal details
- Born: Héctor Antonio Astudillo Flores; 3 July 1958 (age 68) Chilpancingo de los Bravo, Guerrero, Mexico
- Party: Institutional Revolutionary Party
- Education: National Autonomous University of Mexico (LLB)
- Occupation: Lawyer and politician

Héctor Antonio Astudillo Flores (born 3 July 1958) is a Mexican lawyer and politician affiliated with the Institutional Revolutionary Party (PRI) who served as the governor of Guerrero from 2015 to 2021.

He had previously served in the Senate for Guerrero during the 58th and 59th sessions of Congress and as municipal president of Chilpancingo de los Bravo between 2009 and 2012. He was also elected to the Congress of Guerrero for two terms (1994–1996 and 1999–2000).

On 9 June 2020, Governor Astudillo Flores reported he had contracted COVID-19, but that he planned to continue remote working. As of that date, Guerrero reported 2,325 confirmed cases and 347 deaths from the virus.
