= Acapulco (municipality) =

Municipality in the Mexican state of Guerrero

Acapulco de Juárez
- Municipality
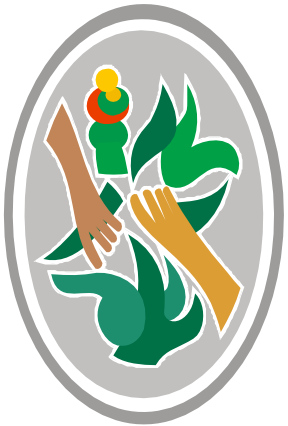
- Coat of arms

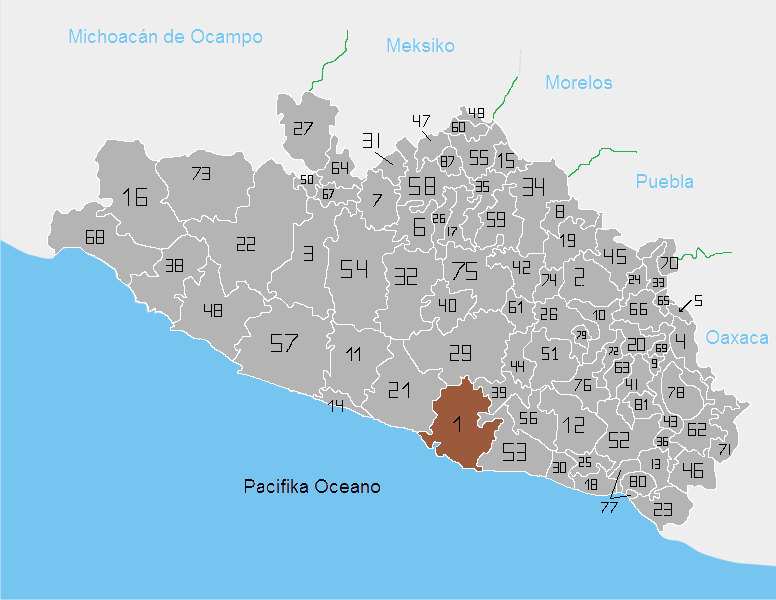

- Location in Mexico Acapulco de Juárez (Guerrero)
- Coordinates: 16°55′20″N 99°49′15″W
- Country: Mexico
- State: Guerrero
- Municipal seat: Acapulco
- Incorporated (municipality): August 6, 1824

Government
  - Municipal president: Abelina López Rodríguez Morena

Area
  - Municipality: 1,727.3 km^{2} (666.9 sq mi)

Population (2020)
  - Municipality: 779,566
  - Metro: 852,622
- Time zone: UTC-6 (Zona Centro)

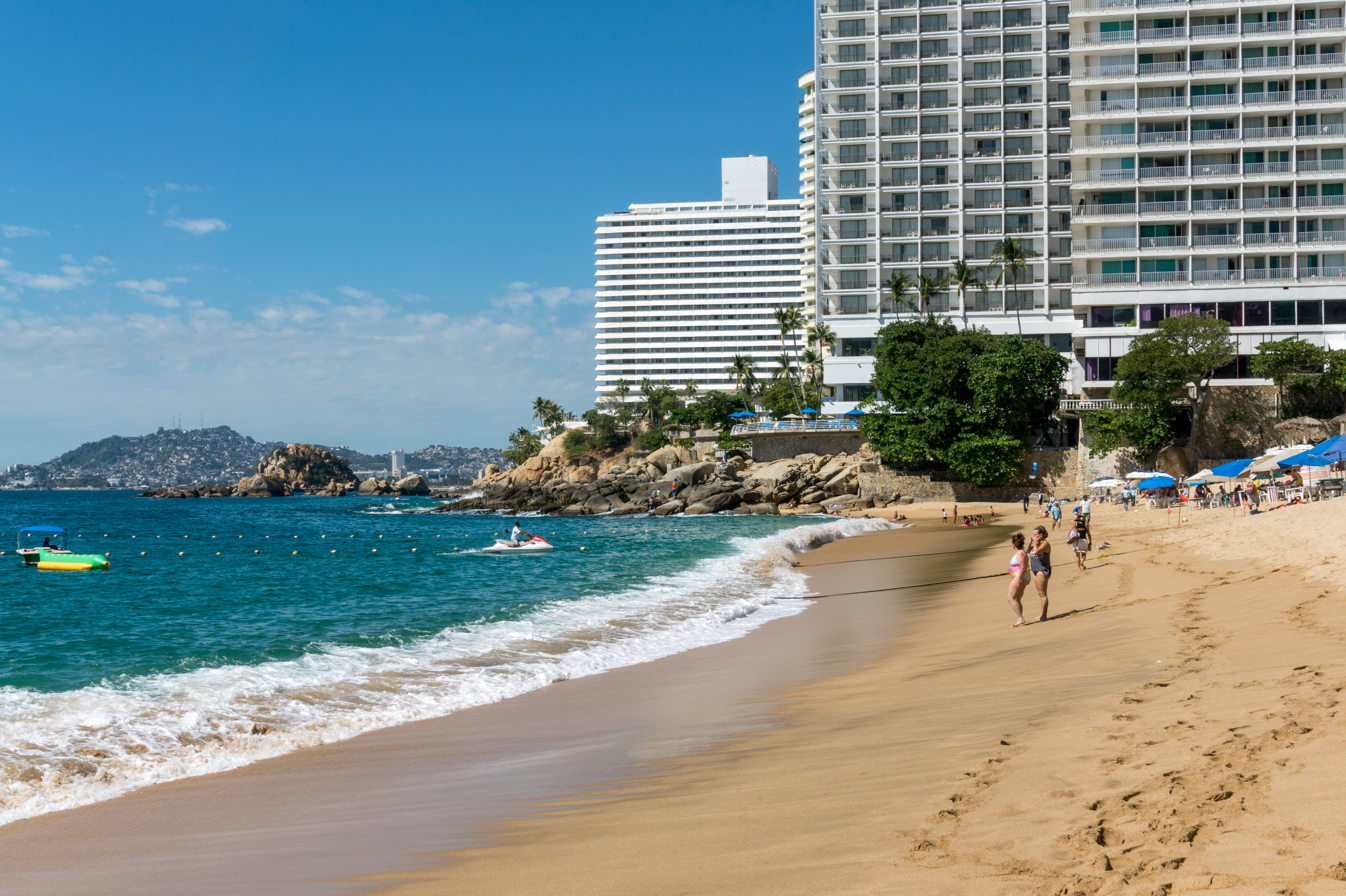
Beach in Acapulco Bay

Acapulco de Juárez is one of the 81 municipalities of Guerrero, in southwestern Mexico, along Acapulco Bay on the Pacific coast, being both the most populous and most densely populated municipality in Guerrero. The municipal seat lies at Acapulco.

Forty percent of the municipality is mountainous terrain; another forty percent is semi-flat; and the other twenty percent is flat. Altitude varies from sea level to 1,699 metres (5,574 feet). The highest peaks are Potrero, San Nicolás, and Alto Camarón.

One major river runs through the municipality, the Papagayo, along with a number of arroyos (streams). There are also two small lagoons, Tres Palos and Coyuca, along with a number of thermal springs.

It was incorporated on August 6, 1824, as part of the State of Mexico, and became part of the new state of Guerrero upon its creation on October 27, 1849. De Juárez was officially added to its name on June 20, 1873.

As of 2020, the municipality had a total population of 779,566, covering an area of 1,727.3 square kilometres (666.9 sq mi).

Its current municipal president is Abelina López Rodríguez, from the Morena political party.

== Localities ==
The municipality has 231 communities and the most populous localities are:

Cities	Population	%
Acapulco	658,609	84.48%
Xaltianguis	6,564	0.84%
Kilómetro 30	6,334	0.81%
Tres Palos	5,668	0.73%
San Pedro las Playas	4,430	0.57%
Amatillo	3,914	0.5%
Total population	779,566	100%

== Government ==
- List of municipal presidents of Acapulco
