= Congress of Guerrero =

Legislature of Guerrero, Mexico

Honorable Congress of the State of Guerrero Honorable Congreso del Estado de Guerrero
- LXIV Legislature

Type
- Type: Unicameral

History
- Founded: January 30, 1850

Leadership
- President: Jesús Parra García, PRI
- 1st Vice President: Marisol Bazán Fernández, MORENA
- 2nd Vice President: Gladys Cortés Genchi, PEVM

Structure
- Seats: 46
- Political groups: MORENA (23) PRI (6) PEVM (6) PRD (4) PT (4) MC (2) PAN (1)

Elections
- Voting system: First-past-the-post for 28 electoral district seats and Mixed-member proportional representation for 18 proportional representation seats
- Last election: June 2, 2024

Meeting place
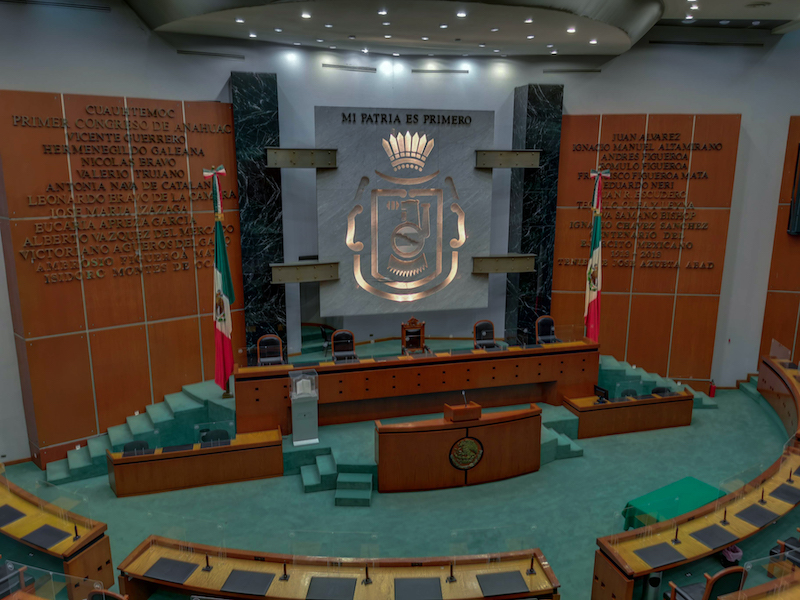
- Legislative Palace; Chilpancingo, Guerrero, Mexico

Website
- congresogro.gob.mx

The Honorable Congress of the State of Guerrero (Spanish: Honorable Congreso del Estado de Guerrero) is the legislative branch of the government of the State of Guerrero. The Congress is the governmental deliberative body of Guerrero, which is equal to, and independent of, the executive.

The Congress is unicameral and consists of 46 deputies. 28 deputies are elected on a first-past-the-post basis, one for each district in which the entity is divided, while 18 are elected through a system of proportional representation. Deputies are elected to serve for a three-year term.

== History ==
=== Constituent Congress ===
The Constituent Congress was installed on January 30, 1850, in the city of Iguala, which was then the capital of the state. By decree number 32, dated January 12 of the same year, the Local Congress established the territorial division of the State, which was made up of nine electoral districts. The first Electoral Law of the State was enacted on October 6, 1851.

In the Provisional Organic Law for the Internal Arrangement of the State, enacted in March 1850, the figure of the Government Council was established, which had permanent deputation functions and was made up of three Councilors appointed by the Congress.

The State Congress has had different headquarters, the first in the city of Iguala in the first three months of the year 1850; The second was in Ciudad Guerrero from April 1850 until 1871, and finally, the city of Chilpancingo de los Bravo, which was definitively declared the seat of the three branches of government.

I Legislature
Nicolás Bravo
Diego Álvarez
Juan José Calleja
José María Añorve de Salas
Félix María Leyva
Ignacio Castañón
Miguel Ibarra
Ignacio Cid del Prado
Eugenio Vargas
Tomás Gómez
José María Cervantes

=== Constitutional Congress ===
The First Political Constitution of the Free and Sovereign State of Guerrero was published on June 26, 1851. It established that the composition of Congress was unicameral and that the election of its members would be carried out indirectly. Article 52 of this constitutional document established that legislative work would be regulated by an Internal Regulation of Congress.

The Political Constitution of 1851 provided that the Legislative Congress would be renewed by half every two years, with the Deputies with the longest service being elected at the end of each two-year period. Among the most important powers that this Constitution granted to Congress is the appointment of the Governor of the State, based on the proposal of a list of three candidates made by electors appointed by Congress itself.

In 1862, a new Constitution was enacted, which established for the first time the system of direct election of Deputies to the State Congress. Likewise, for the first time, the figure of a permanent deputation, made up of the Deputies themselves, was established.

Through constitutional reforms, in 1874, for the first time, two ordinary sessions were established annually, also indicating that the total renewal of the Congress would take place every two years.

In 1880, the Political Constitution of the State was reformed again, which allowed the number of Deputies to increase to thirteen. These reforms also stipulated that preparatory meetings would be held for the installation of the Legislatures.

In 1917, a new Local Political Constitution was enacted, establishing for the first time, the direct election of the Governor of the State, as well as the documentation of the “electoral district”. In the aforementioned ordinance, the public nature of the sessions was established.

Through Decree Number 86, various important reforms were applied to the Local Political Constitution, which were published in the Official Gazette on December 13, 1950. Among them, the obligation of the State Governor to present an annual report to the Local Congress regarding the state of the different branches of public administration stands out.

On June 2, 1955, the first Internal Regulations of the Chamber of Deputies were promulgated. Through reforms made to the Local Political Constitution, the period of constitutional exercise of the legislatures was extended from two to three years and the figure of Party Deputies was established; through this means, the parties opposed to the Institutional Revolutionary Party were represented for the first time in the State Congress, during the constitutional exercise of the XLIX Legislature, which began its work on February 20, 1978. The Popular Socialist Party was assigned a Deputy.

Through another constitutional reform, in 1984 the number of Deputies was increased, and the possibility of the Congress being made up of up to 18 Deputies was established, 14 elected by first-past-the-post and, where appropriate, by four more elected by proportional representation. Also, for the first time, the issuance of an Organic Law of the Legislative Power was foreseen, which was enacted on June 27, 1985.

The reforms made to the Political Constitution of the State in 1986 established the possibility of the Congress being made up of 26 Legislators: 14 elected by first-past-the-post and up to 12 Deputies assigned by proportional representation.

A new reform applied in 1992 to the aforementioned article, provided that Congress could be composed of up to 46 Deputies, 28 elected by first-past-the-post and up to 14 more assigned by proportional representation, also prescribing the clause of governability in favor of the majority party, to which by law four proportional representation seats should be assigned.

The last reform to article 29 of the State Constitution was carried out in 1996, establishing at 28 the number of Legislators elected by first-past-the-post and up to 18 the number of Deputies elected by proportional representation. The governability clause was eliminated, providing that no political party may have more than 30 Deputies elected by both principles.

=== Wall of Honor ===
The Wall of Honor is a set of surfaces on which the names of national heroes, institutions or individuals recognized for their merits to Guerrero have been inscribed in gilt bronze letters with the aim of rendering them tribute and perpetuate their names in historical memory.

At the center is a stylized backlit carving of the Coat of Arms of the State. Above the coat of arms is the state motto and famous phrase of the insurgent and later President of Mexico Vicente Guerrero:

My homeland comes first.

CUAUHTEMOC	MI PATRIA ES PRIMERO	JUAN ALVAREZ
PRIMER CONGRESO DE ANAHUAC		IGNACIO MANUEL ALTAMIRANO
VICENTE GUERRERO		ANDRES FIGUEROA
HERMENEGILDO GALENA		ROMULO FIGUEROA
NICOLAS BRAVO		FRANCISCO FIGUEROA MATA
VALERIO TRUJANO		EDUARDO NERI
ANTONIA NAVA DE CATALAN		JUAN R. ESCUDERO
LEONARDO BRAVO DE LA CAMARA		TEOFILO OLEA Y LEYVA
JOSE MARIA IZAZAGA		EVA SAMANO BISHOP
EUCARIA APREZA GARCIA		IGNACIO CHAVEZ SANCHEZ
ALBERTO VAZQUEZ DEL MERCADO		CENTENARIO DEL EJERCITO MEXICANO
AMBROSIO FIGUERO MATA		1913-2013
ISIDORO MONTES DE OCA		TENIENTE JOSE AZUETA ABAD

== Current Composition ==
The current LXIV Legislature of the Congress of Guerrero initiated on September 1, 2024 and will conclude on August 31, 2027. The current legislature will be in session concurrent with the governorship of Evelyn Salgado Pineda.

=== Single Member Districts ===
District	Constituency	Deputy	Party
I	Chilpancingo	Héctor Suárez Basurto	MORENA
II	Chilpancingo	Diana Bernabé Vega	MORENA
III	Acapulco	Alejandro Carabias Icaza	PVEM
IV	Acapulco	Marisol Bazán Fernández	MORENA
V	Acapulco	Arturo Álvarez Angli	PVEM
VI	Acapulco	Violeta Martínez Pacheco	MORENA
VII	Acapulco	Carlos Eduardo Bello Solano	MORENA
VIII	Acapulco	Marco Tulio Sánchez Alarcón	MORENA
IX	Acapulco	Joaquín Badillo Escamilla	MORENA
X	Tecpan	Vladimir Barrera Fuerte	MORENA
XI	Petatlán	Leticia Rodríguez Armenta	MORENA
XII	Zihuatanejo	Rafael Martínez Ramírez	MORENA
XIII	San Marcos	Gladys Cortés Genchi	PVEM
XIV	Ayutla	Catalina Apolinar Santiago	MORENA
XV	Cruz Grande	Guadalupe García Villalva	MORENA
XVI	Ometepec	Claudia Sierra Pérez	PT
XVII	Coyuca	Víctor Hugo Vega Hernández	PRI
XVIII	Ciudad Altamirano	Bulmaro Torres Berrum	PRI
XIX	Eduardo Neri	Citlali Yaret Tellez Castillo	MORENA
XX	Teloloapan	Robell Urióstegui Patiño	PRD
XXI	Taxco de Alarcón	Obdulia Naranjo Cabrera	PVEM
XXII	Iguala	Luissana Ramos Pineda	MORENA
XXIII	Huitzuco	Ana Lilia Botello Figueroa	MORENA
XXIV	Tixtla	Jorge Iván Ortega Jiménez	PRD
XXV	Chilapa	Jesús Parra García	PRI
XXVI	Olinalá	Pánfilo Sánchez Almazán	PT
XXVII	Tlapa	Aristóteles Tito Arroyo	MORENA
XXVIII	San Luis Acatlán	Edgar Ventura de la Cruz	PT

=== Proportional Representation ===
Deputy	Party
Gloria Citlali Calixto Jiménez	MORENA
María Guadalupe Eguiluz Bautista	MORENA
Jacinto González Varona	MORENA
Glafira Meraza Prudente	MORENA
Araceli Ocampo Manzanares	MORENA
Pablo Amilcar Sandoval Ballesteros	MORENA
Jesús Eugenio Urióstegui García	MORENA
Alejandro Bravo Abarca	PRI
María Del Pilar Vadillo Ruiz	PRI
Beatriz Vélez Núñez	PRI
Jhobanny Jiménez Mendoza	PVEM
Hilda Jenifer Ponce Mendoza	PVEM
Erika Isabel Guillén Román	PRD
Rebeca Núñez Martín del Campo	PRD
Julián López Galeana	MC
Erika Lorena Lührs Cortés	MC
Leticia Mosso Hernández	PT
Maria Irene Montiel Servín	PAN

== Standing Commissions ==
The current commissions, presidents and secretaries are:

Commission	President	Secretary
Political Affairs and Governance	Alicia Elizabeth Zamora Villalva	Leticia Castro Ortiz
Constitutional and Legal Studies	Leticia Castro Ortiz	Bernardo Ortega Jiménez
Budgets and Public Accounts	Estrella De la Paz Bernal	Ociel Hugar García Trujillo
Surveillance and Evaluation of the Higher State Authority	Jacinto González Varona	Gabriela Bernal Reséndiz
Tax Authority	Bernardo Ortega Jiménez	Alfredo Sánchez Esquivel
Justice	Jesús Parra García	Beatriz Mojica Morga
Public Security	Joaquín Badillo Escamilla	Adolfo Torales Catalán
Civic Protection	Patricia Doroteo Calderón	Marco Tulio Sánchez Alarcón
Citizen Participation	Julieta Fernández Márquez	Angélica Espinoza García
Human Rights	Leticia Mosso Hernández	Osbaldo Ríos Manrique
Transparency, and Anti-Corruption	Esteban Albarrán Mendoza	Jessica Ivette Alejo Rayo
Attention to Migrants	Osbaldo Ríos Manrique	Patricia Doroteo Calderón
Urban Development and Public Works	Elzy Camacho Pineda	José Efrén López Cortes
Transportation	Rafael Navarrete Quezada	Yoloczin Lizbeth Domínguez Serna
Development and Social Welfare	Claudia Sierra Pérez	Alicia Elizabeth Zamora Villalva
Health	Olaguer Hernández Flores	Andrés Guevara Cárdenas
Education, Science and Technology	Masedonio Mendoza Basurto	Rafael Navarrete Quezada
Economic Development and Work	Ociel Hugar García Trujillo	Joaquín Badillo Escamilla
Handicrafts	María Flores Maldonado	Jennyfer García Lucena
Tourism	Ana Lenis Reséndiz Javier	Yanelly Hernández Martínez
Agricultural and Fisheries Development	Marco Tulio Sánchez Alarcón	Carlos Reyes Torres
Indigenous and Afro-Mexican Peoples and Communities	Marben de la Cruz Santiago	Leticia Mosso Hernández
Gender Equality	Gabriela Bernal Reséndiz	Gloria Citlali Calixto Jiménez
Rights of Girls, Boys and Adolescents	Beatriz Mojica Morga	Julieta Fernández Márquez
Youth and Sports	Angélica Espinoza García	Ana Lenis Reséndiz Javier
Natural Resources, Sustainable Development and Climate Change	Manuel Quiñonez Cortés	Nora Yanek Velázquez Martínez
Culture	Jennyfer García Lucena	Fortunato Hernández Carbajal
Care for the Elderly	Jessica Ivette Alejo Rayo	Adolfo Torales Catalán
Care for People with Disabilities	Gloria Citlali Calixto Jiménez	Jesús Parra García
Water, Infrastructure and Hydraulic Resources	Nora Yanek Velázquez Martínez	Manuel Quiñonez Cortés
Housing	Yanelly Hernández Martínez	Antonio Helguera Jiménez
Judiciary	Susana Paola Juárez Gómez	Carlos Cruz López
Rules	Ricardo Astudillo Calvo	Jacinto González Varona
Mining	Andrés Guevara Cárdenas	Susana Paola Juárez Gómez

== See also ==
- List of Mexican state congresses
