= Herminio =

Herminio is a masculine Spanish given name. The Portuguese equivalent of the name is Hermínio. It may refer to:

== People with the given name ==
- Herminio Ahumada (1899–1983), Mexican politician and former sprinter
- Herminio Alcasid (born 1967), Filipino singer-songwriter
- Herminio Aquino (1949–2021), Filipino businessman and politician
- Herminio A. Astorga (1929–2004), Filipino politician
- Herminio Bautista (1934–2017), Filipino comedian and director
- Herminio Campos (born 1937), Peruvian footballer
- Herminio Chávez (1918–2006), Mexican historian
- Herminio Coloma Jr. (born 1953), Filipino businessman and educator
- Herminio Dagohoy (born 1964), the 96th Rector Magnificus of the University of Santo Tomas, Philippines
- Herminio de Brito (born 1914, date of death unknown), Brazilian footballer
- Herminio Brau del Toro (1922–1998), Puerto Rican lawyer
- Herminio Díaz García, Cuban exile
- Herminio Disini, Filipino businessman closely related to the Marcos dictatorship
- Herminio Giménez (1905–1991), Paraguayan composer
- Herminio Hidalgo (born 1962), Panamanian wrestler
- Herminio Iglesias (1929–2007), Argentine politician
- Hermínio da Palma Inácio (1922–2009), Portuguese revolutionary
- Herminio Lopez Roque Jr. (born 1966), Filipino lawyer and politician
- Herminio Martínez (1896–1976), Spanish footballer
- Hermínio Martinho (born 1946), Portuguese agricultural engineer and politician
- Herminio Masantonio (1910–1956), Argentine footballer
- Herminio Blanco Mendoza (born 1950), Mexican economist
- Herminio Menéndez (born 1953), Spanish sprint canoer
- Herminio Miranda (born 1985), Paraguayan footballer
- Hermínio Pinzetta (1911–1972), Brazilian Roman Catholic
- Hermínio Rebelo, Portuguese sports shooter
- Herminio Toñánez (born 1946), Paraguayan footballer
- Herminio Portell Vilá (1901–1992), Cuban writer and scholar
- Herminio Díaz Zabala (born 1964), Spanish racing cyclist

== People with the middle name ==
- Iranildo Herminio Ferreira (born 1976), Brazilian footballer
- Juan Herminio Cintrón García (1919–2012), Puerto Rican politician
- Fábio Hermínio Hempel (born 1980), Brazilian footballer

== See also ==
- Erminio, Italian equivalent
- Estádio Hermínio Ometto, an association football stadium in São Paulo, Brazil
