= Lombardore =

- Comune
- Comune di Lombardore
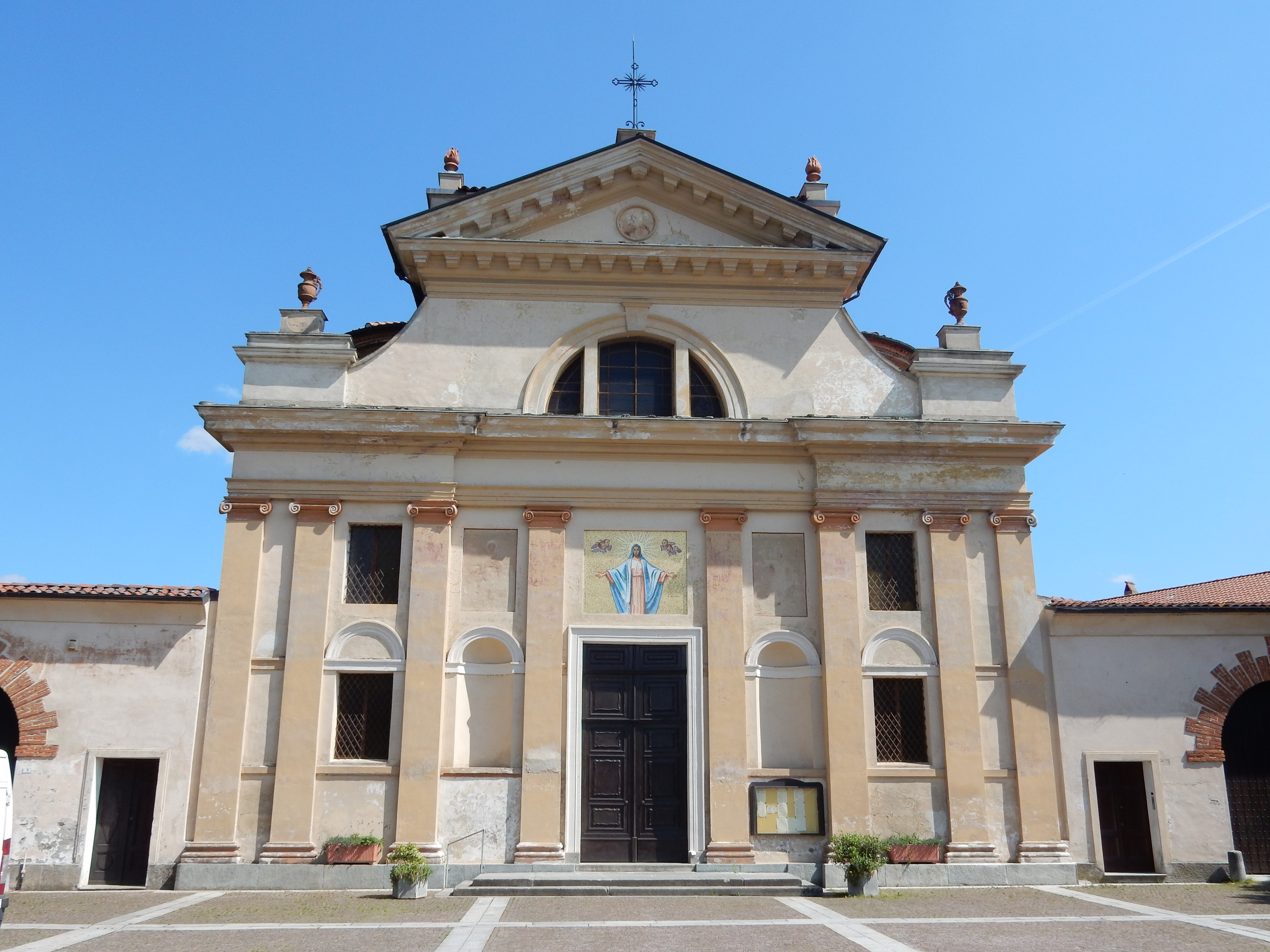
- Church of St. Agapitus

- Coat of arms

- Location within Italy Location within Piedmont
- Coordinates: 45°14′N 7°44′E
- Country: Italy
- Region: Piedmont
- Metropolitan city: Turin (TO)
- Frazioni: Bossole, Cascina Bertola, Case Bertolina, Poligono, Via Vauda Via Francesco Bertino.

Government
  - Mayor: Diego Maria Bili

Area
  - Total: 12.72 km^{2} (4.91 sq mi)
- Elevation: 268 m (879 ft)

Population (1-1-2018)
  - Total: 1,724
  - Density: 135.5/km^{2} (351.0/sq mi)
- Demonym: Lombardoresi
- Time zone: UTC+1 (CET)
  - Summer (DST): UTC+2 (CEST)
- Postal code: 10040
- Dialing code: 011
- Website: Official website

Lombardore is a comune (municipality) in the Metropolitan City of Turin in the Italian region Piedmont, located about 20 kilometres (12 mi) north of Turin.

== Twin towns – sister cities ==
Lombardore is twinned with:

- Casca, Brazil
