= Guerrero =

State of Mexico

Guerrero Tlacateccatl (Nahuatl)
- State
- Free and Sovereign State of Guerrero; Estado Libre y Soberano de Guerrero (Spanish); Tlahtohcayotl Tlacateccatl (Nahuatl)
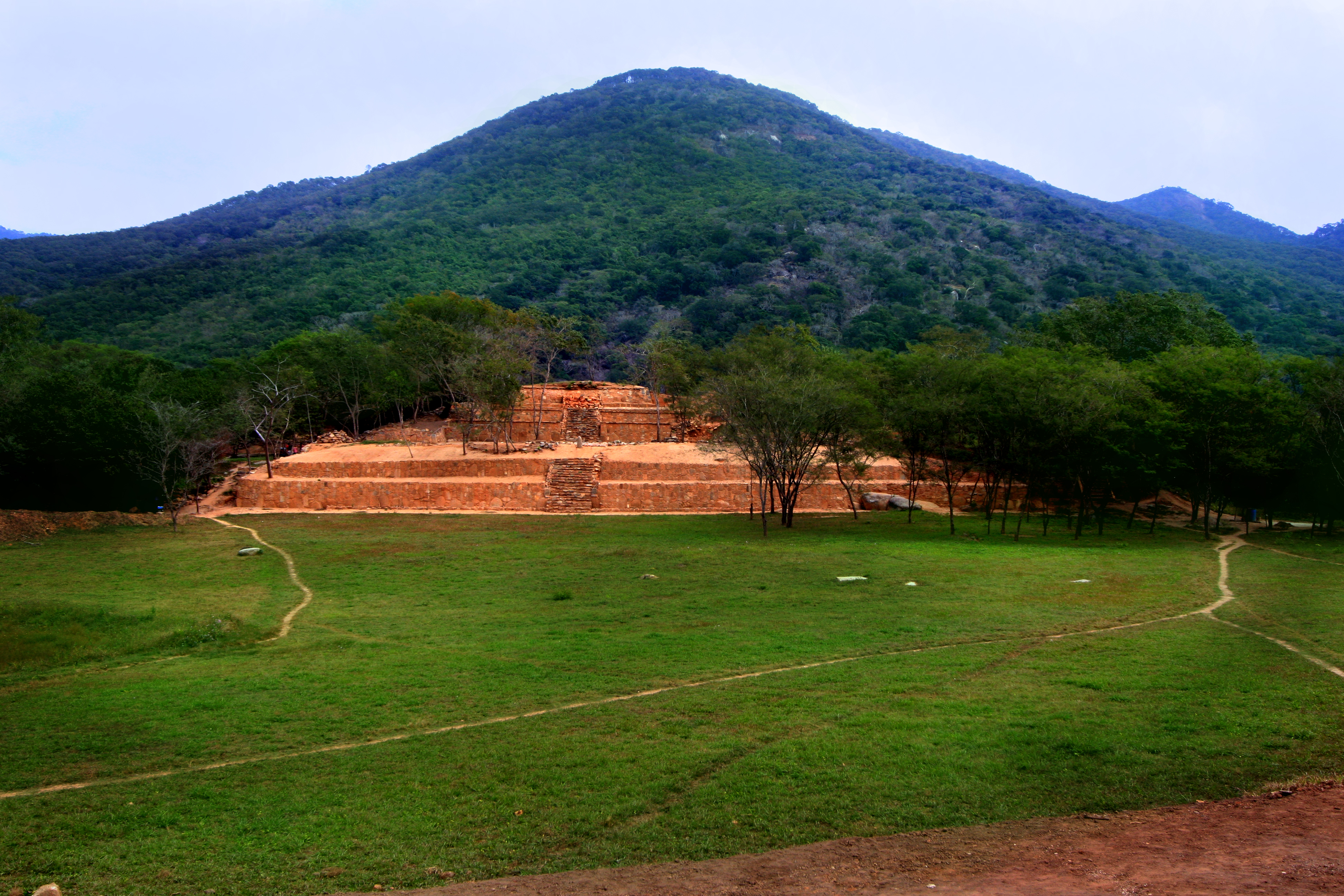
- Tehuacalco archaeological zone

- Flag Coat of arms
- Motto: Mi patria es primero (My country is first)
- State of Guerrero within Mexico
- Coordinates: 17°37′N 99°57′W
- Country: Mexico
- Capital: Chilpancingo
- Largest city: Acapulco
- Municipalities: 81
- Admission: October 27, 1849
- Order: 21st
- Named for: Vicente Guerrero

Government
  - Governor: Evelyn Salgado Pineda
  - Legislature: Honorable Congress of Guerrero
  - President of Congress: Leticia Mosso Hernández
  - Senators: Nestora Salgado García; Félix Salgado Macedonio; Manuel Añorve Baños
  - Deputies: Federal deputies: • 10; • 1; • 1

Area
  - Total: 63,596 km^{2} (24,555 sq mi)
- Ranked 14th
- Highest elevation (Cerro Teotepec): 3,550 m (11,650 ft)

Population (2020)
  - Total: 3,540,685
  - Rank: 12th
  - Density: 55.675/km^{2} (144.20/sq mi)
  - Rank: 16th
- Demonym: Guerrerense

GDP (2022)
  - Total: MXN 392 billion (US$19.5 billion)
  - Per capita: US$5,428
  - Rank: 31st
- Time zone: UTC– 06:00 (CTZ)
- Postal code: 39–41
- Area code: Area codes: • 721; • 727; • 732; • 733; • 736; • 741; • 742; • 744; • 745; • 747; • 753; • 754; • 755; • 756; • 757; • 758; • 762; • 767; • 781
- ISO 3166 code: MX-GRO
- HDI: ▲0.727 high Ranked 30th of 32
- Website: Official website

Guerrero, (Note: Spanish pronunciation: [ɡeˈreɾo]) officially the Free and Sovereign State of Guerrero, (Note: Spanish: Estado Libre y Soberano de Guerrero) is one of the 31 states that compose the 32 Federal Entities of Mexico. It is divided into 85 municipalities. The state has a population of about 3.5 million people. It is located in southwest Mexico and is bordered by the states of Michoacán to the north and west, the State of Mexico and Morelos to the north, Puebla to the northeast and Oaxaca to the east. In addition to the capital city, Chilpancingo and the largest city Acapulco, other cities in Guerrero include Petatlán, Ciudad Altamirano, Taxco, Iguala, Ixtapa, and Zihuatanejo. Today, it is home to a number of indigenous communities, including the Nahuas, Mixtecs, Tlapanecs, Amuzgos, and formerly Cuitlatecs. It is also home to communities of Afro-Mexicans in the Costa Chica region.

The state was named after Vicente Guerrero, one of the most prominent leaders in the Mexican War of Independence and the second President of Mexico. It is the only Mexican state named after a president. The modern entity did not exist until 1849, when it was carved out of territories from the states of Mexico, Puebla, and Michoacán.

Geographically, the state is mountainous and rugged with flat areas limited to small mesas and the Pacific coastline. This coastline has been important economically for the area, first as the port of Acapulco in colonial and post-Independence era and today for the tourist destinations of Acapulco, Zihuatanejo and Ixtapa. Tourism is the single most important economic factor of the state and Acapulco's tourism is important to the nation's economy as a whole. Agriculture and mining are also important to the state's economy, with production of crops like bananas, coffee, rice, corn, and sugarcane, as well as mined copper, silver, and gold. However, other sources of employment are scarce in the state, which has caused its ranking as number one in the emigration of workers to the United States.

== History ==
=== Prehistoric and Pre-Columbian periods ===
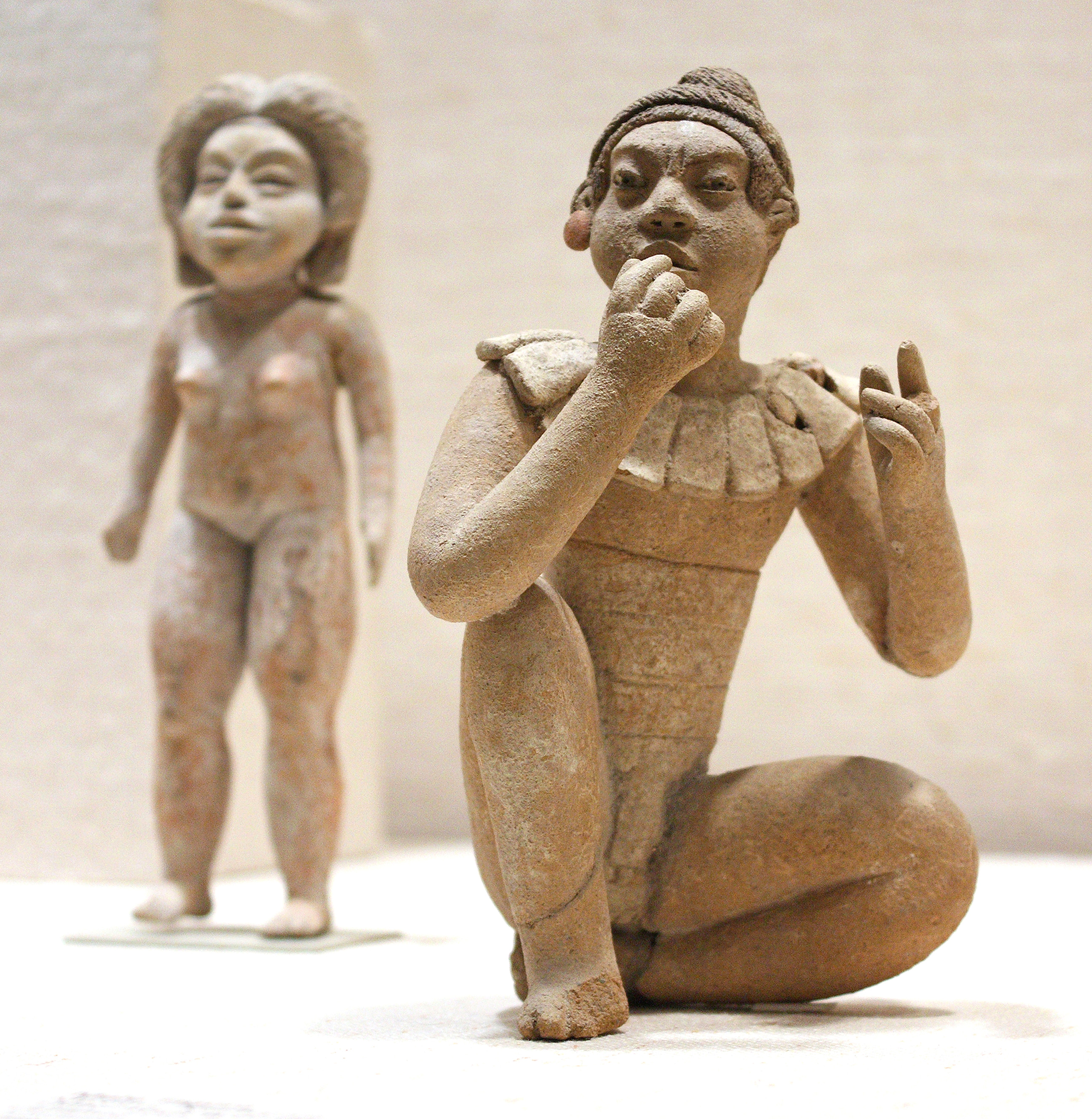
Two figures from the Xochipala archeological site

Around 20,000 years ago, the first people inhabited caves in the Guerrero terrain. Evidence of the nomadic hunter-gatherers was left in various caves in the area. Until about 8,000 years ago, climatic conditions better favored human habitation than those today; however, sedentary human habitation happened around this time in the mountainous areas with more moisture, and better soil for agriculture. After that, settlements appeared near the coast because of fishing. At these sites, evidence of weaving, ceramics, basketry and other crafts has been found. Around this time, a grain called teocintle, or the forerunner to corn, became the staple of the diet.

There is debate as to whether the earliest civilizations here were Olmecs, who migrated to this region or native peoples who were heavily influenced by the Olmecs, especially in the Balsas River area. Olmec influences can be seen in cave paintings such as those found in Juxtlahuaca and Cacahuaziziqui as well as stone tools and jade jewelry from the time period.

Recent evidence indicates that ancient Guerrero cultures may have influenced the early development of the Olmecs.

Eventually, the peoples of the Mexcala River area developed their own distinctive culture, called Mezcala or Mexcala. It is characterized by its own sculpture and ceramics, distinguished by its simplicity. Olmec influence remained with this culture, especially evident in the grouping of villages, construction of ceremonial centers and a government dominated by priests. Later, the culture assimilated aspects of the Teotihuacan model, which included the Mesoamerican ballgame.

Teotihuacan evidently had a great influence in Guerrero, particularly in the north and the Costa Grande. This can be seen in the spread of talud-tablero architecture and iconography showing Tlaloc and the Feathered Serpent. Some scholars have proposed that this influence is evidence of Teotihuacano conquest, which would have resulted in the establishment of tributary provinces and, in some areas, even direct control. On the other hand, other scholars maintain that Teotihuacano influence can be explained as conscious imitation of the prestigious metropolis by the Guerrero elite. At any rate, the north may have supplied Teotihuacan with manpower while the coast may have exported local resources. Teotihuacano iconography persisted in Guerrero until 800 CE after Teotihuacan itself had collapsed. Guerrero also received influences from Monte Albán during the classic period in the form of Zapotec glyphs.

Later migrations to the area brought ethnicities such as the Purépecha, Mixtecs, Maya and Zapotecs who left traces on the local cultures as they established commercial centers around the seventh century. In the 8th century, Toltec influence was felt as they traveled the many trade routes through here in search of tropical bird plumage and amate paper. From the 12th century to the 15th, the various peoples of the state were influence by the Chichimecas, culminating in Aztec domination by the 15th century.

In the 11th century, new migrations entered the area from the north, which included the Nahuas, who occupied what is now the center of the state, and the Purépecha who took over the west. The Nahuas established themselves in Zacatula, Atoyac de Álvarez and Tlacotepec, later conquering the areas occupied by the Chontal and Matlatzincas.

By the 15th century, the territory of the modern state of Guerrero was inhabited by a number of peoples, none of whom had major cities or population centers. The most important of these peoples were the Purépecha, Cuitlatecs, Ocuiltecs and Matlatzincas in the Tierra Caliente, the Chontales, Mazatecos and Tlahuicas in the Sierra del Norte, the Coixcas and Tepoztecos in the Central Valleys, the Tlapanecos and Mixtecs in the La Montaña, the Jopis (Tlapanecos), Mixtecos and Amuzgos on the Costa Chica and Tolimecas, Chumbias, Pantecas and Cuitlatecas on the Costa Grande. Most of these lived in smaller dominions with moderate social stratification. One distinctive feature of the peoples of this region was the use of cotton garments.

The Aztecs began making incursions in the Guerrero area as early as 1414 under Chimalpopoca as part of the conquest of the Toluca Valley. Incursions into the Tierra Caliente came around 1433 under Itzcoatl who attacked the Cuitlatecos settled between the Teloloapan and Cocula Rivers. By 1440, the Aztec Empire controlled the north of the state, or the La Montaña area. Attempts to take the Costa Chica area began in 1452 against the Yopis, which failed. Various battles would be fought between 1452 and 1511 before most of the rest of the state became Aztec tributary provinces. The modern state of Guerrero comprised seven Aztec provinces. The total population of the territory of Guerrero circa 1520 has been estimated between 700,000 and 786,000 people, concentrated in the Montaña and northern regions.

=== Colonial period ===
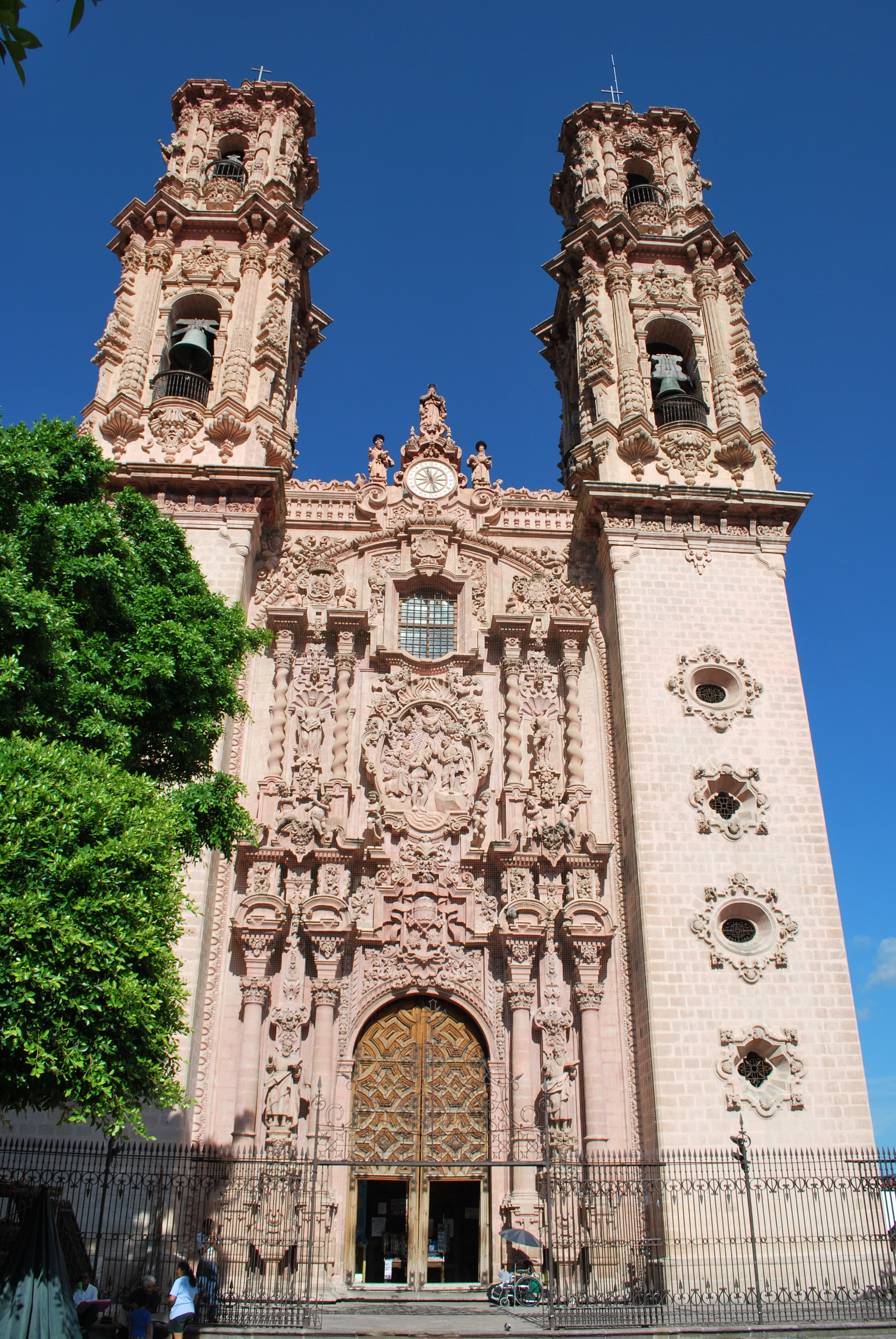
Santa Prisca church in Taxco

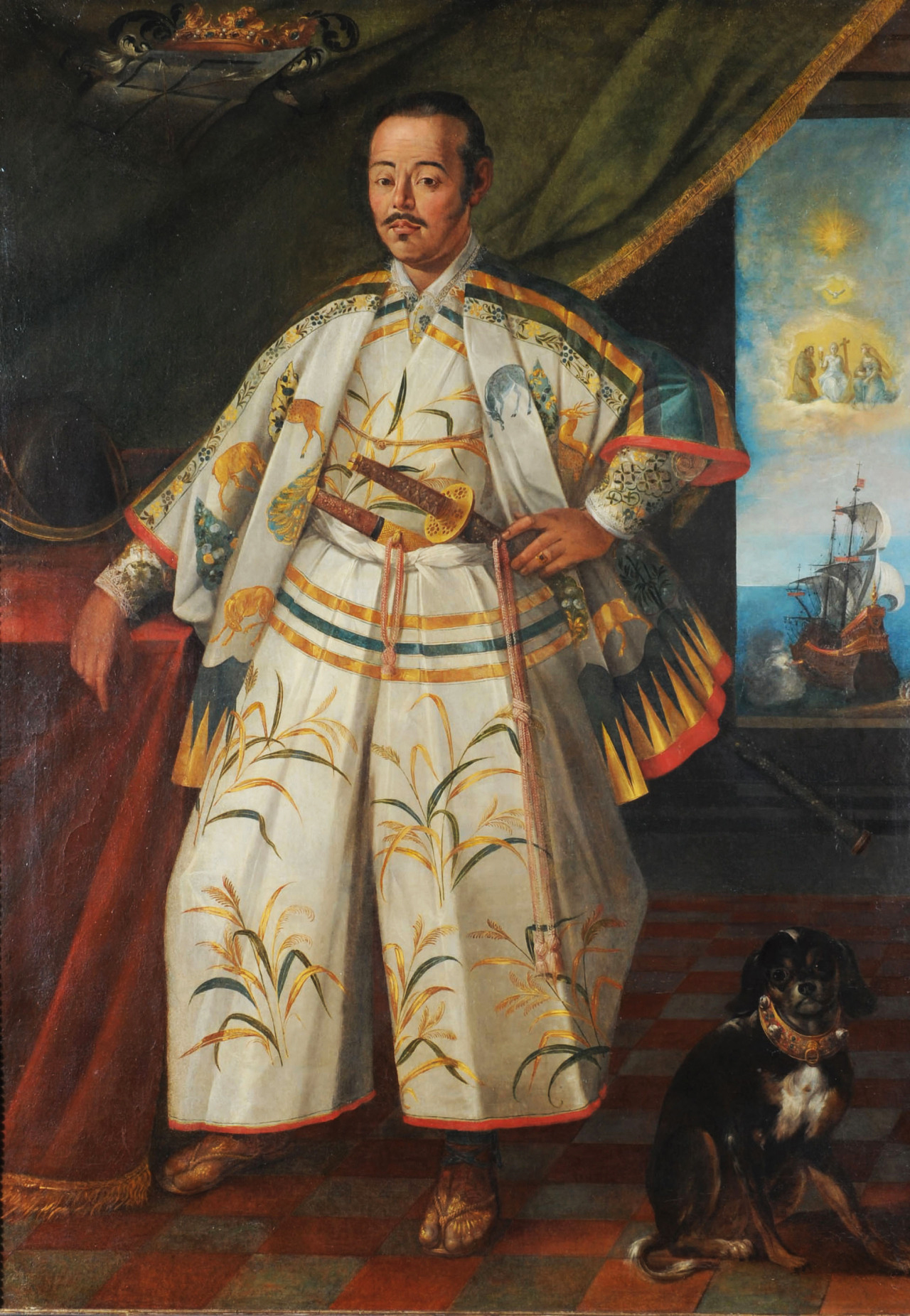
Hasekura Tsunenaga, the samurai who led the Japanese delegation to Mexico

During the Spanish conquest of the Aztec Empire, the last Aztec emperor, Cuauhtémoc (who was the son of a Chontal princess and Ahuizotl), came from Ixcateopan de Cuauhtémoc. After the fall of Tenochtitlan, there was little resistance by the peoples of the Guerrero area to the Spanish and a number of them, such as the Amuzgos, actively sided with the Europeans. In 1521, Rodrigo de Castañeda entered the Taxco area, while Gonzalo de Sandoval marched on the Chontal region, the Sierra del Norte, the Iguala valley and later the Costa Chica. Juan Rodriguz de Villafuerte took the Costa Grande area.

After the Spanish Conquest, the territory was part of the audencia or "court of royal law for indigenous peoples" called México, which initially consisted of the lands of the former Aztec Empire, which was then diminished somewhat when it became a province of New Spain. The Guerrero area was attractive to the Spanish mostly for its coast. The first Spanish Pacific port was at Zihuatanejo, used for trade, fishing and pearls. Another important area for the Spanish was Taxco for its minerals. The lands were divided into 76 encomiendas given to the conquistadors to exploit and "civilize" the mines, farmlands, forest and native peoples. Evangelization efforts were undertaken by the Augustinians in the Central Valleys, La Montaña and Tierra Caliente regions while the Franciscans took the northern areas, the Costa Grande and Acapulco.

Much of the population decline occurred in the first half of the 16th century when diseases brought by the Europeans, as well as brutal exploitation, killed many natives. This was particularly true in the Costa Chica region, which would lead to the importation of African slaves to the area. During this time indigenous political bodies called "pueblos" or "Indian Republics" arose, which were local entities that represented the Indians of that area before Spanish authorities. They are credited with being one of the forerunners of the current municipality system in the state. At their height, there were 213 such pueblos in the Guerrero territory.

During the colonial period, Acapulco became the main western port for New Spain, connecting this part of the Spanish empire to Asia. The Manila galleon came here each year, bringing silks and other merchandise from China, India and other Asian areas. Also on board were thousands of Asian slaves. These slaves and other Asian individuals that migrated of their own will during the colonial period form the basis of what is known as the "cuarta raíz" of Mexico.

On January 25, 1614, a delegation led by samurai Hasekura Tsunenaga, which included over one hundred Japanese Christians as well as twenty-two samurai under the shōgun Tokugawa Ieyasu, arrived from Japan to Acapulco as part of a mission to form closer relations with Catholic Europe. A fight soon broke out in which a Japanese samurai stabbed a Spanish colonial soldier. This was witnessed and recorded by historian Chimalpahin, who was descended from an Aztec nobleman. Some of Tsunenaga's delegation would stay and marry with the locals.

By the second half of the 18th century, few indigenous people survived and exploitation of those that were left took on more varied forms in indentured servitude. Acapulco became the most important city in the area, and its mayor governed much of Guerrero's territory. This territory then belonged into three intendencias or alcaldias–Puebla, Mexico and Valladolid, regions managed by a superintendent intended to root out corruption–and would remain so until the early Independence period.

=== Independence and the later nineteenth century ===
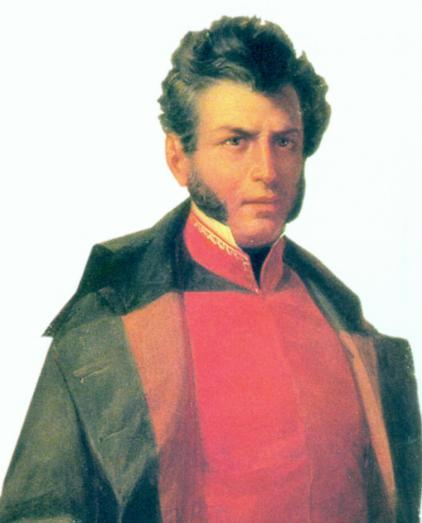
Vicente Guerrero

Peoples of the territory of Guerrero immediately supported the cause of Miguel Hidalgo y Costilla which would culminate with the Independence of Mexico. During the first part of the Mexican War of Independence, José María Morelos fought on the side of Miguel Hidalgo in the southern part of Mexico, including the Acapulco area and the Costa Grande. Filipino-Mexicans led by Isidoro Montes de Oca, who were also against Spanish colonization, assisted in the general uprising. However, the insurgents were never able to take the port. They were able to take control of territories in the center of the state. Morelos took Chilpancingo and set up the Congress of Anáhuac, which would publish the document "Sentimentos de la Nación" on 6 November 1813. The Congress of Anáhuac also approved the Act of Independence written by Carlos María Bustamante. Later, the Mexican flag was designed and first sewn in Iguala, after Agustín de Iturbide and Vicente Guerrero joined forces under the Plan of Iguala to end the war in 1821.

The first government of an independent Mexico divided the country into twelve departments. The territory of the modern state of Guerrero was divided among the departments of Mexico, Puebla, Michoacán, and Oaxaca. The 1824 Constitution made these entities states.

In 1823, Nicolás Bravo and Vicente Guerrero petitioned for the creation of a "South State" (Estado del Sur), encompassing the lands that Guerrero had military control over during the war, but without success. However, the federal government did recognize a military district centered on Chilpancingo which Guerrero headed until he became President of Mexico in 1824.

Much of the country struggled between its liberal (federalist) and conservative (centralist) factions in the first half of the 19th century. In one of these battles, Vicente Guerrero was captured and executed in Oaxaca in 1831. With conservatives in charge, Nicolas Bravo proposed in 1836 a South Department with its capital in Chilpancingo, including the provinces of Acapulco, Chilapa, Tlapa and Taxco. In 1841, representatives from 42 communities in the area, called the "amigos del sur," pushed to have a "Acapulco Department" created, but it was rejected by Antonio López de Santa Anna.

There were other political and military reorganizations in the area during the 1840s. In 1847, Nicolas Bravo and Juan Álvarez proposed creating a separate entity for the Acapulco, Chilapa and Taxco areas, but the Mexican–American War intervened. After the war, the states of Puebla, Mexico and Michoacán were persuaded to cede territory for a new entity.

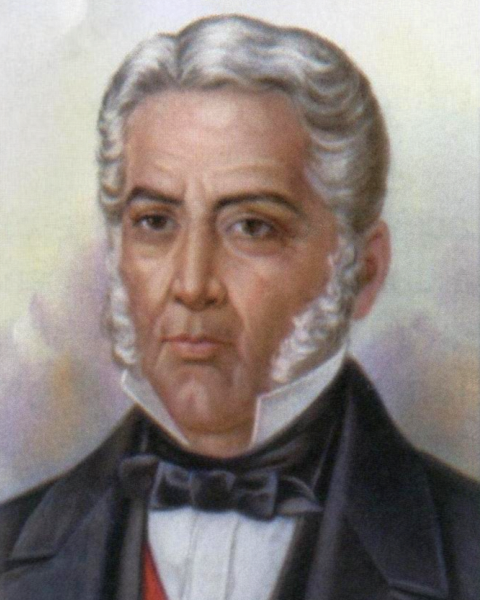
Juan Álvarez

In 1849, President José Joaquín de Herrera decreed the establishment of the state of Guerrero, with Juan Álvarez as its first governor. Tixtla was declared the first capital. The state was created from the districts of Acapulco, Chilapa and Taxco from the State of Mexico, Tlapa from Puebla and the municipality of Coyuca from the state of Michoacán. The capital would later be moved to Chilpancingo in 1870.

In this state, Juan Álvarez rebelled against the government of Ignacio Comonfort and declared the Plan of Ayutla in 1854. However, this rebellion was quelled by the federal government. More uprisings would ensue after the adoption of the 1857 Constitution. These uprisings were part of the ongoing struggle between liberals and conservatives in the country. The state of Guerrero was a mostly conservative area of the country, and it opposed both the 1857 Constitution and the 1859 Reform Laws. Intense battle between liberal and conservative elements would continue through most of the rest of the 19th century.

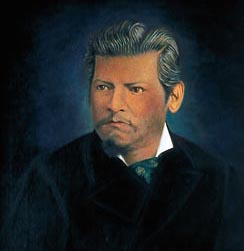
Ignacio Manuel Altamirano, born in Tixtla (Guerrero), liberal politician, writer

For most of the period of President Porfirio Díaz's regime (1876–1911), the state was in relative peace, electing nine governors, although only two of these were Guerrero natives. The economy became concentrated in the hands of a few landholders, military people and others. While the era was relatively prosperous, very little of this benefit reached the common people. Laws were passed and infrastructure in the state was created to benefit the major players of the economy. In addition, indigenous people were forced from the north to the south to work, such as the Kickapoos who were forced to work in the haciendas of the Costa Chica. Some of the first factories built in the state were constructed during this period. Acapulco was connected to Mexico City by rail in the 1890s. Despite the economic development, many people remained without work at the very end of the 19th century as mining and cotton farming waned.

=== Mexican Revolution to the present ===
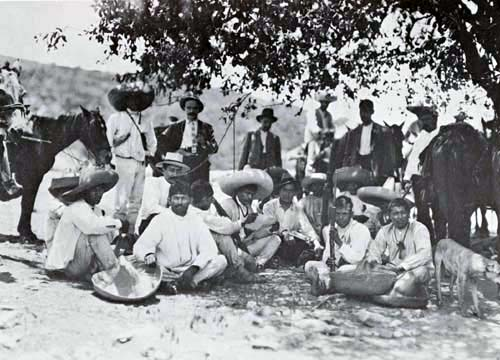
Zapatistas in El Jilguero

Some of the first uprisings against Diaz occurred in the state. In 1873 in the La Montaña region, Pascual Claudio pronounced the Plan de Xochihuahuetlan, with the backing of the Tlapanecos and Mixtecs of the state and pushed for the socialization of land. The revolt was put down one year later. In 1876, field workers in various regions rebelled against taxes, usurpation of lands and oppression against political prisoners. Another revolt occurred in 1887 in the Tlapa regions, led by Silverio Leon. In 1891, a movement led by José Cuevas has a messianic character to it and worked to bring down the Diaz government. In this case, federal control over much of Guerrero was weakened. In the 1900s, a number of intellectuals, including Eusebio S. Almonte (great grandson of Morelos) rebelled politically against the state and federal governments. The revolt was put down by Victoriano Huerta.

A number of other rebellions broke out in the state against the Diaz government until the start of the Mexican Revolution in 1910. From that point, many of the local rebels became affiliated with the Zapatistas.

In 1911, after Díaz resigned, the last of his supporting troops in Guerrero surrendered in Acapulco. Rebels loyal to Francisco I. Madero chose Francisco Figueroa as the governor and established Guerrero's capital in Acapulco. While Madero was initially popular in Guerrero, he soon lost standing for failure to return lands which were claimed by various indigenous and rural farm groups. From this point, the Zapatistas turned on the Madero government with the next phase of the revolution breaking out in Guerrero and other states. The Zapatistas soon had control of the central valley and strategic positions in the north of the state. When Victoriano Huerta took control of the country, the Zapatistas in Guerrero joined forces with those loyal to Venustiano Carranza, eventually controlling almost all of the state by 1914. During this time lands were redistributed. However, after Huerta resigned and Carranza assumed the presidency, the Zapatistas in Guerrero opposed him as well. Carranza offered the position of governor of Guerrero to Julian Blanco in 1915 but he was killed in an ambush a year later. From this point, there were battles between the Zapatistas and forces loyal to Carranza. This ended in 1919, when Emiliano Zapata died and his movement split.

Various battles among the factions of the Mexican Revolution had skirmishes in the state until the war was finally over in 1920. The Zapatistas, although fragmented, were recognized as a political force in Guerrero with many Zapatistas receiving political and military positions. This included Rodolfo Neri as governor, who initiated the Agrarian Reform in 1921, organized workers' unions and made education mandatory.

Although the Revolution was over, there were still factional struggles among unions, local strongmen, foreign interests and rural farm organizations over land, education and politics. These would flare up into localized armed rebellions such as the one led by Romulo Figueroa in 1923 and federal attempts to recuperate lands in 1927. In addition, battles related to the Cristero War were fought in Guerrero as well. There were a number of strikes and other political actions by unions in the 1930s. Government intervention brought better agricultural production techniques as well as new crops such as coconut groves, sesame seed and coffee. Some industries were introduced as well, especially in Iguala and Chilpancingo. Most of these are related to food processing, mining and energy production.

From the 1930s, to the present, the making of crafts and tourism have played a significant role in the economy. In Taxco, silver mining and silversmithing made a comeback due to the efforts of William Spratling. Tourism is mostly centered on the coastal communities of Acapulco, Zihuatanejo and the tourist resort of Ixtapa. Acapulco became the first major tourist attraction for the state in the 1950s, when Hollywood stars such as Elizabeth Taylor, Frank Sinatra, Eddie Fisher, Brigitte Bardot and others made it fashionable. During the 1960s and 1970s, new hotel resorts were built, and accommodation and transport were made cheaper. It was no longer necessary to be a millionaire to spend a holiday in Acapulco; the foreign and Mexican middle class could now afford to travel there. Zihuatanejo, with the nearby resort area of Ixtapa, were developed by the federal government in the 1970s and 1980s to increase tourism to the area.

In the early 2000s, the federal government proposed the construction of a dam in Guerrero. The project faced significant opposition from communities that would have been impacted by the project such as the villages of Garrapatas, Arroyo Verde, and San José which would have been flooded by the dam's diversion of water. In 2025 Marco Antonio Suástegui, the leader of the campesino movement in Guererro that had opposed the dam and other projects was killed by an unknown assailant.

In 2012, some teachers from rural areas, including Guerrero, opposed federal regulations which prevented them from automatic lifetime tenure, the ability to sell or will their jobs, and the teaching of either English or computer skills. In September 2014, the municipality of Iguala was the site of a mass kidnapping of 43 students that drew national and international attention.

== Demographics ==
Largest cities or towns in Guerrero Source:
Rank		Municipality	Pop.
1	Acapulco	Acapulco de Juárez	658,609
2	Chilpancingo	Chilpancingo de los Bravo	225,728
3	Iguala	Iguala de la Independencia	132,854
4	Zihuatanejo	Zihuatanejo de Azueta	70,760
5	Tlapa	Tlapa de Comonfort	59,580
6	Taxco	Taxco de Alarcón	50,399
7	Chilapa	Chilapa de Álvarez	33,783
8	Zumpango del Río	Eduardo Neri	27,944
9	Ometepec	Ometepec	27,607
10	Ciudad Altamirano	Pungarabato	25,850

Historical population
Year	Pop.	±%
1895	420,926	—
1900	479,205	+13.8%
1910	594,278	+24.0%
1921	566,836	−4.6%
1930	641,690	+13.2%
1940	732,910	+14.2%
1950	919,386	+25.4%
1960	1,186,716	+29.1%
1970	1,597,360	+34.6%
1980	2,109,513	+32.1%
1990	2,620,637	+24.2%
1995	2,916,567	+11.3%
2000	3,079,649	+5.6%
2005	3,115,202	+1.2%
2010	3,388,768	+8.8%
2015	3,533,251	+4.3%
2020	3,540,685	+0.2%

The state is home to four indigenous ethnic groups, most of whom live in rugged, isolated mountain areas such as Ixcateopan, Santa María Oapan, Ameyaltepec, Chilapa de Álvarez, Malinaltepec, Tlapa de Comonfort, Metlatonoc, Zapotitlan Tablas and Xochistlahuaca and Xilitla. Some of these groups include the Mixtecs, Nahuas, Amuzgos and Tlapanecos, and over 20 indigenous languages are spoken. The most common languages are Nahuatl (38.9%), Mixtec (27%), Tlapanec (21.9%) and Amuzgo (7.9%). The Cuitlatec culture was also native to the western part of the state, but their language and identity went extinct in the 1960s. Only 29% of those who speak an indigenous language also speak Spanish.

One distinctive group in the state is the Amuzgo people, who are concentrated in the south, near the Oaxacan border in municipalities such as Xochistlahuaca. This group is known for its handwoven textiles done on backstrap looms with many pieces recognized by the Consejo Nacional para la Cultura y las Artes. Cualac is noted for its machetes which have blades decorated by etching miniature landscapes. Temalacacingo and Acapetlahuaya produce gourd items, toys and small lacquered items. Olinalá has been an important producer of lacquer since pre-Hispanic times.

Another important group is the "afromexicanos" or Afro-Mexicans who are concentrated in the Costa Chica region. This group is found in Guerrero and the Costa Chica area of Oaxaca. This group has been relatively isolated from the rest of Mexico, with little modernization or formal education. To this day, there are many who have no birth certificates or know how to read or write. Much of the history of these people is preserved in oral tradition. Historically, afromexicanos have been discriminated against and marginalized. Even among these people today, the concept of being "negro" is considered bad and a number take to skin-lightening methods. The musical style associated with the group is "Chilena" which became popular outside of Guerrero and Oaxaca after the 1960s. One of these songs, "Soy negro de la Costa…," has been preserved by CONACULTA and INAH as part of Mexico's cultural heritage. A major change for this community came with the building of the highway connecting Acapulco with Pinotepa Nacional and Puerto Escondido, which opened it up to the outside world. This allowed the shipping of goods and influx of people. The increase in people and contacts led to the building of schools. According to the 2020 Census, 8.58% of Guerrero's population identified as Black, Afro-Mexican, or of African descent, which is the highest percentage of any state in Mexico.

A genetic study in 2018 has also revealed that around one-third of the population of Guerrero have 10% Filipino ancestry. Like the culturally surviving afromexicanos, most were brought to Mexico by the trans-Pacific slave trade via the Manila galleons. The classification of Filipinos as "chinos" upon arrival in Mexico during the 16th and 17th centuries has led to their modern conflation with later 19th century Chinese immigrants.

== Culture ==
The state does not have a tradition of painting and other visual arts aside from amate paper work but, recently, there has been a movement to promote more classical oils and other works, with recent generations of painters from the state and galleries opening to promote their work. Some of these artists include Casiano García, Ian Malaj, Leonel Maciel, Miguel Ángel Sotelo, Gerzaín Vargas and Hugo Zúñiga.

The literary arts have a longer tradition, at least as far back as the 17th century. The best-known writer from the state hailed from Taxco, playwright Juan Ruiz de Alarcón. He is considered to be one of the most notable writers from the Siglo de Oro of Spanish literature. Another notable writer from the state is Ignacio Manuel Altamirano, although he is better known for his role in the defeat of Emperor Maximilian I and as a politician than as a writer. Other writers from the state over the centuries include Celedonio Serrano, Herminio Chávez, Juan Sánchez Andraka and Andrés Acosta.

The state has a long history of folk music, which has been the basis of much of the state's modern compositions as well. Because of the different ethnicities, traditions and customs vary from region to region. In the coastal lowlands, music such as "son" is most often heard and dances such as jarabes. The culture of the Costa Chica region of Guerrero is centered on the municipality of Tixtla. Dances performed here include the Arranca Zacete, Jarabes, Palomo or Chilena and the Fandango. Most of these are accompanied by bands playing wind instruments. Another type of music which is endemic to the state is called "calentana", which comes from an area called the Tierra Caliente. Tixtleca music comes from the town of Tixtla in the center of the state. Guerrero's best known composer is Margarito Damián Vargas, who was active in the late 19th and early 20th centuries. He was only 37 years old when he died, but he had written more than 200 musical works including "Ondas del Pacífico," "Me delirio," "Adiós a Acapulco," and "Dolores," which have been performed by orchestras and popular singers. Other musicians include José Agustín Ramírez Altamirano, Zacarías Salmerón Daza and Joan Sebastian. As well, another singer from Guerrero, Aida Pierce, became better known as an actress and comedian.

Some interesting regional customs in Guerrero include the burning of "malo" (evil) on 29 September made with dried flowers. Afterward, protective crosses of fresh flowers are placed on doors of homes. Other customs are the singing of "Papaquis" instead of "Las Mañanitas" in Tixtla, the weddings of the Costa Grande where guests pay for their own food, the tiger fight dance in Zitlala and Tixtla and eating pozole on Thursdays in Chilpancingo.

Cuisine in the state is most strongly influenced by the indigenous, the Spanish and, to some extent, the French. Corn, chili pepper, beans and meat are indigenous ingredients. Indigenous preparations include the various moles (red, green, yellow and others), chalupas, totopos, atole, pozole and many other dishes. Spanish contributions include wheat, leavened bread (including "chilpancingueñas") and dairy products. French influence comes from the French occupation of the country in the 19th century as well as French monks who had been in the area of Chilapa earlier. Regional dishes include mole de jumil (made from a particular type of native beetle) in Taxco, bean tamales in Tepecuacuilco, quail dishes in Iguala and seafood "cuatete" in the Costa Chica area. A number of areas in the state produce mezcal and wine is made in the Huitzuco area. Pozole blanco is widely and traditionally consumed on Thursdays and Saturdays in the state.

The state's ethnic groups are known for their unique musical styles as well as regional dances. The best known dance is the Danza de los Tlacoloteros. This originated in the Central Valleys region, and its theme is agriculture. The owners of "tlacololes" (cornfields) are called "tlacololoeros." The basic premise is that these tlacololoeros chase away malevolent spirits from the crops, which are represented by naguals or fierce tigers. The dance has 15 characters. It is most often performed in places such as Chichuihualco, Taxco, Chilpancingo, Iguala and Atlixtac. Another dance that feature tigers is the Danza del Tecuano, where the animals stalk characters. This one is most often performed in Tuxpan, Ciudad Altamirano and Huitzuco. Other dances performed in the state include the Danza de los Diablos, the Danza de los Manueles, the Danza de los Gachupines, the Danza de los Siete Vicios, the Danza de los Pescados, the Danza de los Machos, the Danza de los Moros, the Danza de los Maizos, the Danza de los Zopilotes, the Danza de los Tejoneros and the Danza del Palomo de Guerrero.

== Tourism ==
=== Triangle of the Sun ===
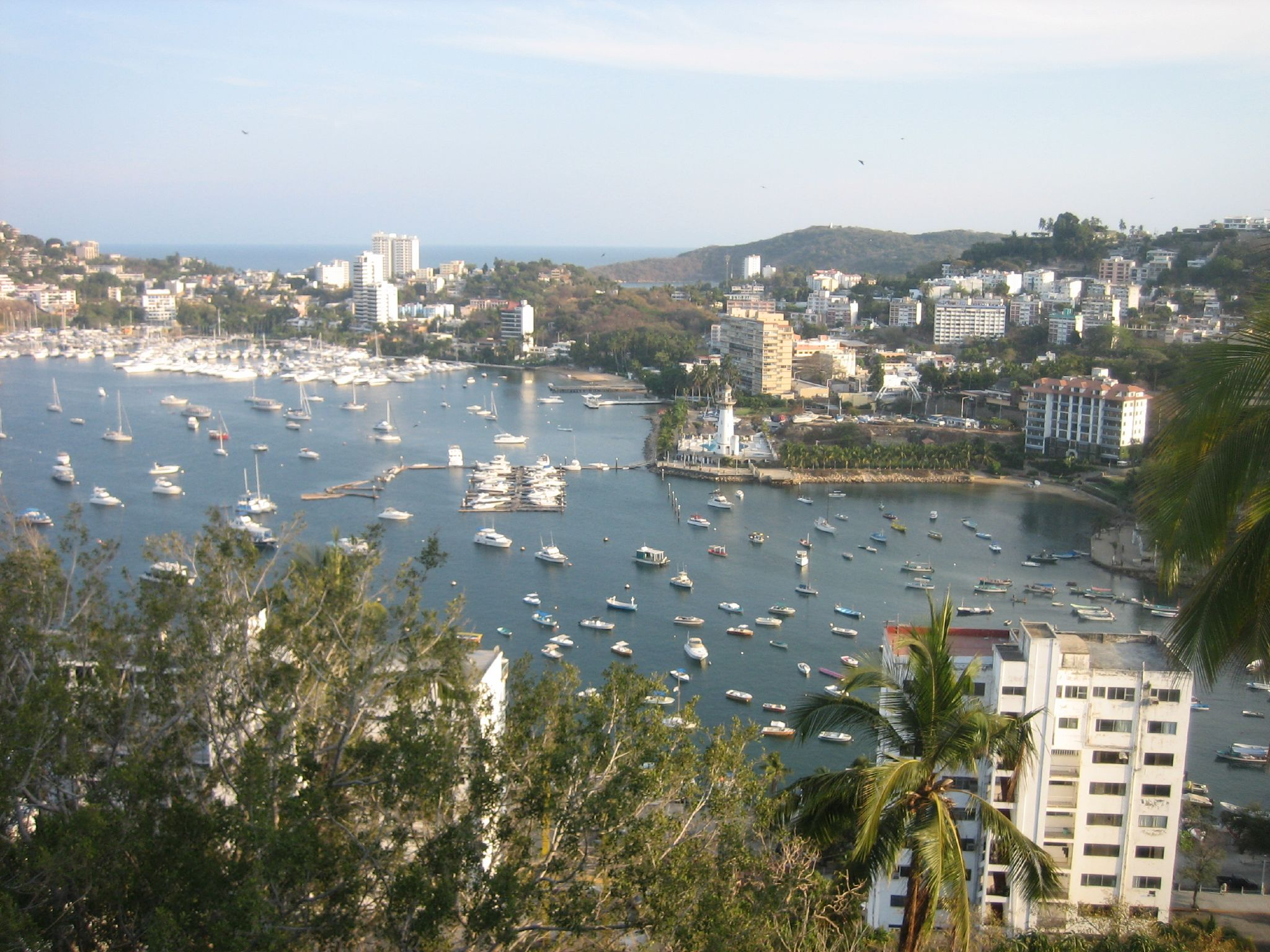
Acapulco Bay

Almost all of Guerrero's tourism is concentrated among the municipalities of Acapulco, Zihuatanejo and Taxco, which the state promotes as the "Triángulo del Sol" (Triangle of the Sun). Acapulco is by far the most important of the three. In 2008, the state attracted 272.8 million dollars of private investment into the tourism sector of the economy, with most of it invested in Acapulco and Zihuatanejo/Ixtapa. In addition, federal tourism agencies invested another 180 million pesos that year, both for infrastructure and promotion. The State Department of the United States has issued travel advisories for the state, especially Acapulco, due to drug trafficking, but safety concerns have been dismissed by local authorities.

Acapulco is one of Mexico's oldest and most well-known beach resorts, which came into prominence by the 1950s as a getaway for Hollywood stars and millionaires. Acapulco is still famous for its nightlife and still attracts many vacationers, although most are now from Mexico itself. Zihuatanejo is the fourth-largest city in the Mexican state of Guerrero. It is northwest of Acapulco. This town has been developed as a tourist attraction, paired along with the modern tourist resort of Ixtapa, 5 km away. However, Zihuatanejo keeps its traditional town feel. Taxco was one of the primary mining areas during the colonial period. It has narrow winding streets with no sidewalks, due to being built in a narrow ridge on the side of a mountain. The town was declared a national monument by Mexico in 1990, with numerous historical buildings dating from the 17th to 19th centuries.

=== Archeological sites ===
Drawing of a Teopantecuanitlan monolith

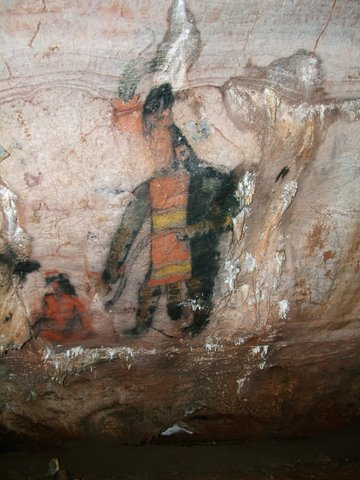
Painting 1 of the Caves of Juxtlahuaca.

Most of Guerrero's pre-Hispanic history is known through archeology. The state has 1,705 registered archeological sites, with seven officially open to the public. These include La Organera-Xochipala, Palma Sola, Teopantecuanitlán and Cuetlajuchitlán. La Organera-Xochipala is the best known of Guerrero's archeological sites because of its monumental architecture. The site has seven states of development with six patios, and thirty two structures. The site covers 1,600 m^{2} (17,000 sq ft) and is located in the community of Xochilapa in the municipality of Eduardo Neri or Zumpango del Río, which is a mountains and semi-arid region of the state. It was occupied from 650 CE to 1000 CE The tombs are the most notable constructions here and feature a number of Mayan "false arches." .

Palma Sola is a site on the south side of El Veladero in Acapulco. This site does not have any structure but rather it is important for 18 rocks with petroglyphs with images of humans, plants and animals. There are also figures which look to be calendar like and geographic in function.

Teopantecuanitlan is the most important Olmec era site in Guerrero. Its calculated to extend over 160 hectares (400 acres) but the most important buildings cover 50,000 m^{2} (540,000 sq ft). It was discovered in 1983 as it was being sacked. It is estimated to have been inhabited from between 1000 and 500 BCE. It is located in the Valley of Copalillo where the Amacuzas and Mezcala (Balsas) Rivers converge. Cuetlajuchitlan was discovered accidentally during the construction of the Cuernavaca, Acapulco highway. To preserve the site, the Los Querendes Tunnel was built underneath it. It is calculated to extend 35 hectares (86 acres) but only 2 hectares (4.9 acres) have been explored. It was principally occupied between 200 BCE and 200 CE. It is identified as being with the Mezcala culture. The site stands out as an early example of a planned city which extends from the intersection two main roads.

Other, smaller sites include Ixcateopan, Los Tepoltzis and Huamuxtitlan. Pueblo Viejo is located on the side of the El Tamarindo mountain just west of the city of Iguala. This site has an extension of 901,145 m^{2} (9,699,840 sq ft) and is divided in two parts due to a ravine that runs through it. The exact number of structures here is not known because the site has not been fully explored. The site of Ixcateopan is located in the municipality of the same name. The explored site was a civic-religious center with a palace and an altar to Quetzalcoatl. Los Tepoltzis is located outside the community of Tixtla and consists of a number of small sites including a ceremonial center thirty meters long, three meters high with stairways and a plaza. Huamuxtitlán is in the municipality of the same name. While the site is covers significant territory only one pyramid has been uncovered. Most of the rest of the site consists of living quarters. Near this site are smaller sites along the Tlapaneco River.

=== Outdoor activities ===
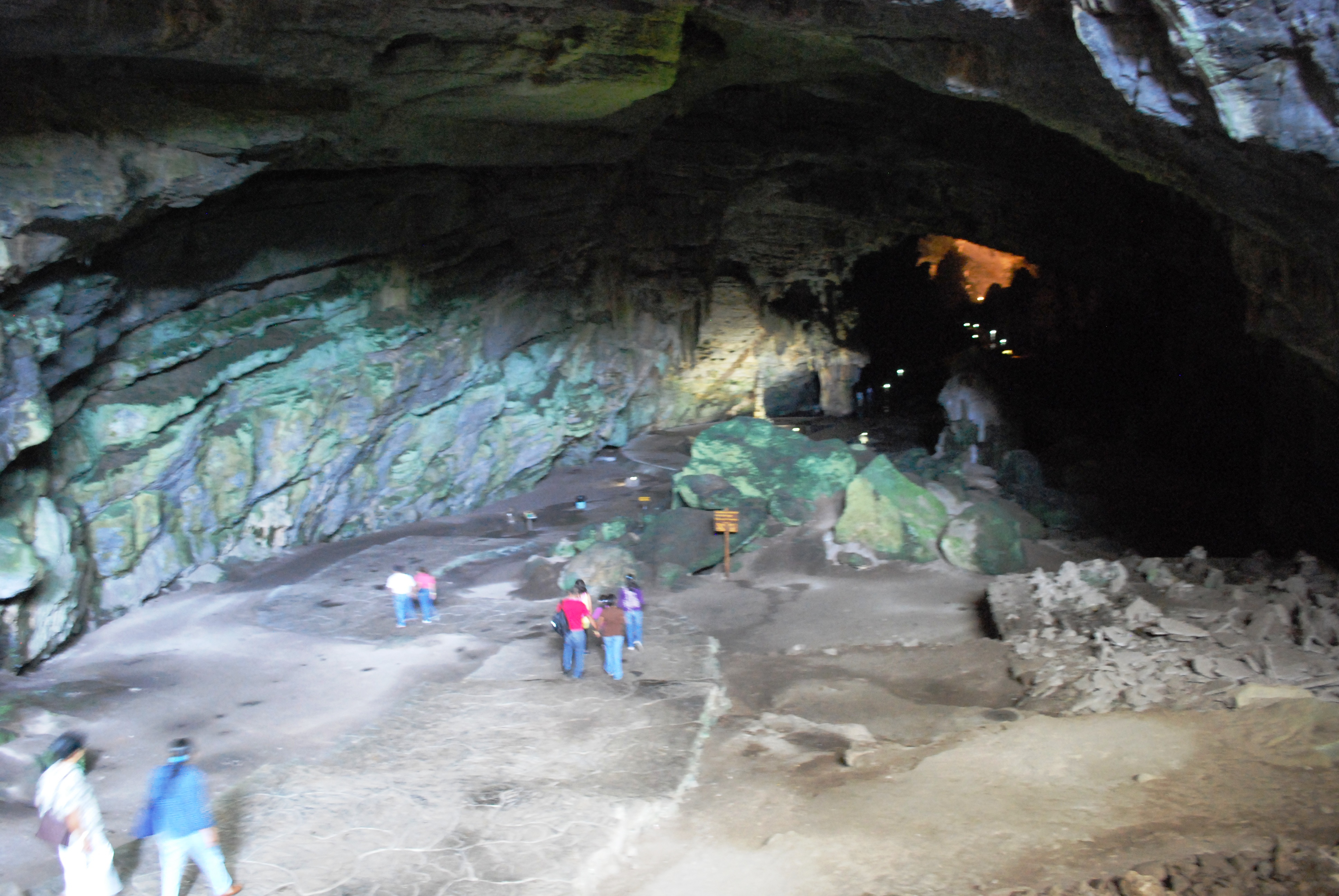
Entering the Cacahuamilpa Caves

The state has a number of sites suitable for ecotourism, including mountains, caves, wild areas for the observation of flora and fauna, camping and areas that offer extreme sports. Many of the extreme sports are offered in the Acapulco area including high-speed water jets, kayaking, canoeing, river rafting, rock climbing, spelunking, paintball, mountain climbing, parasailing and more. Activities in other parts of the state include rafting on the Papagayo River, kayaking and canoeing in Ixtapa and Zihuatanejo, rock-climbing in Chilpancingo and Taxco, mountain climbing in Ixcateopan, rappelling in Zihuatanejo and bungee jumping and parasailing in Iguala.

There are a number of caves to explore such as Grutas Dos Arroyos in Dos Arroyos, various small caves in Pueblo Bravo and some in Acapulco. The best known caves in the state are in the Grutas de Cacahuamilpa National Park. This park is home to the Grutas de Cacahuamilpa Caverns and Grutas de Carlos Pacheco. The first is a live cave with many rock formations still in progress. This has infrastructure for tourists and guided tours. The second set of caves is a dry cave with less infrastructure.

== Handcrafts ==
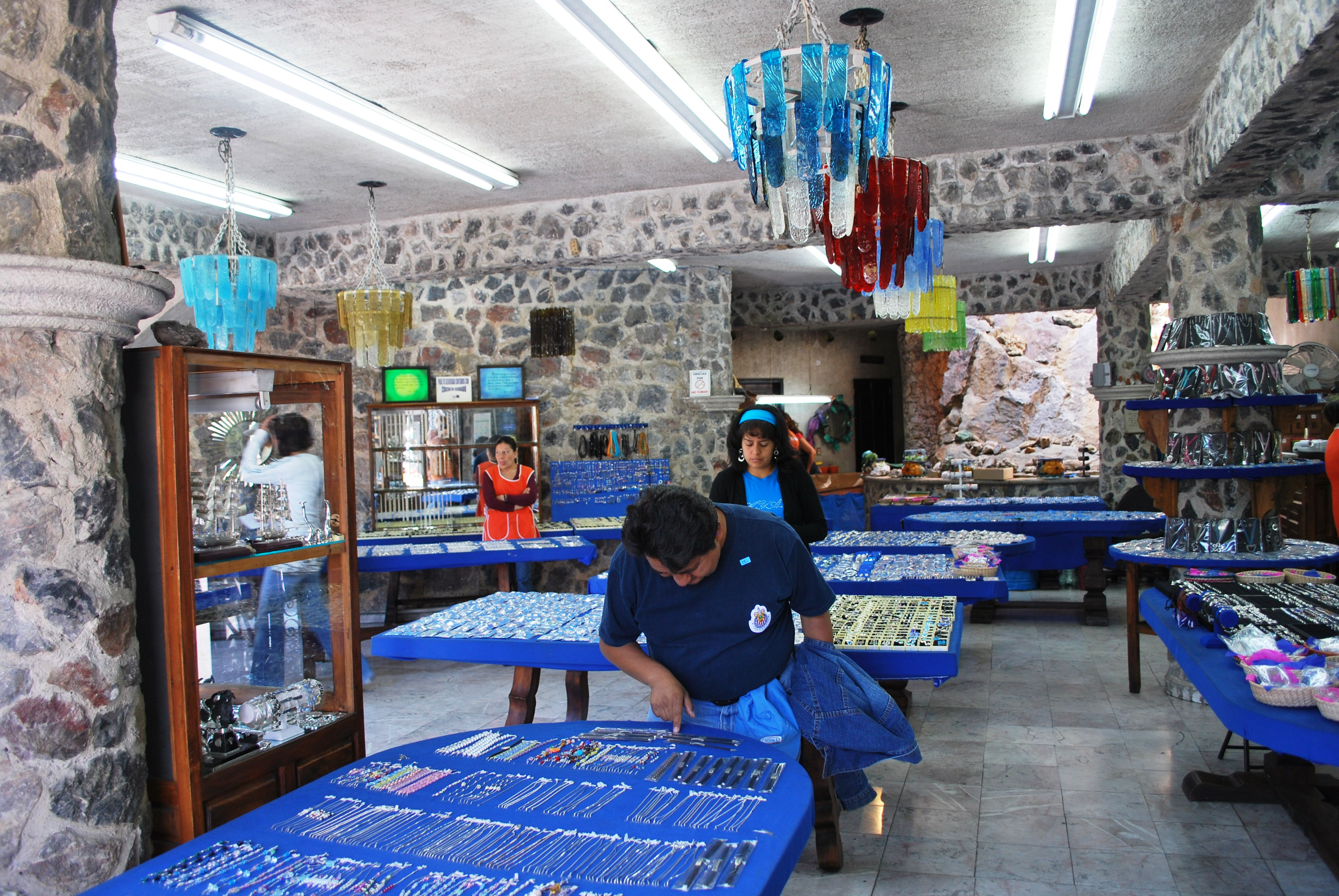
Browsing at a silver shop in Taxco

Crafts form an important part of the state's economy, providing all or part of many families' income. The state government passed the Ley de Fomento a la Cultural in 1988 which works to protect crafts produced within the state. One type of handcraft produced in the state is metalworking with most precious and non-precious metals. The best known work produced in the state is made with silver, centered in the town of Taxco. Each year this town holds the annual National Silver Fair (Feria Nacional de la Plata). Gold is worked in locations such as Iguala, Ciudad Altamirano, Coyuca de Catalán, Arcelia and Ometepec. Steel machetes and other items are produced in Ayutla, Tixtla, Chilapa, Tecpan deGaleana and Ometepec. Gold leaf is done in Tlacotepec, Tlalchipa and Cuetzala del Progreso. Costume jewelry is made in Acatlán, and Chilapa, producing buttons of various colors, pieces made of brass coated in nickel, glass and metal wire to produce items such as necklaces, bracelets, and more. Other jewelry is made by twisting and weaving fine strands of silver or gold wire. Silver is mostly done in Taxco, with gold pieces in Ciudad Altamirano.

Wooden items are locally painted and coated with a high-gloss lacquer (laca). The best pieces of this type are made of a distinctively aromatic wood called lináloe (from Bursera aloexylon). But due to lináloe's relative scarcity, cheaper ones are made from pine and treated to smell like lináloe. The making of lacquered items is centered in the municipality of Olinalá, but also in Temalcalcingo, Ocotepec and Acapetlahuaya. Items made include small boxes, chests, trays, masks, frames, jewelry boxes.

Pottery is a very traditional craft and is practices in many of the communities of the state, although most of the wares produced are basic and meant for local consumption. These items include cooking pots, water containers, pitchers, candle holders and some sculptured decorative items. Most of these items have been made the same way since the pre-Hispanic period. The best quality ware is considered to be made in the central valleys in municipalities such as Zacualpan, Nuitzalapa, Atzacualoya, and others. Some areas have become specialized for certain types of pieces. The San Juan neighborhood of Chilapa make figures of a cerarmic which is glassy after firing. Acatlán makes ceramic toys, and Ometepec specializes in the making of very large cántaro jars, traditionally used for storage.

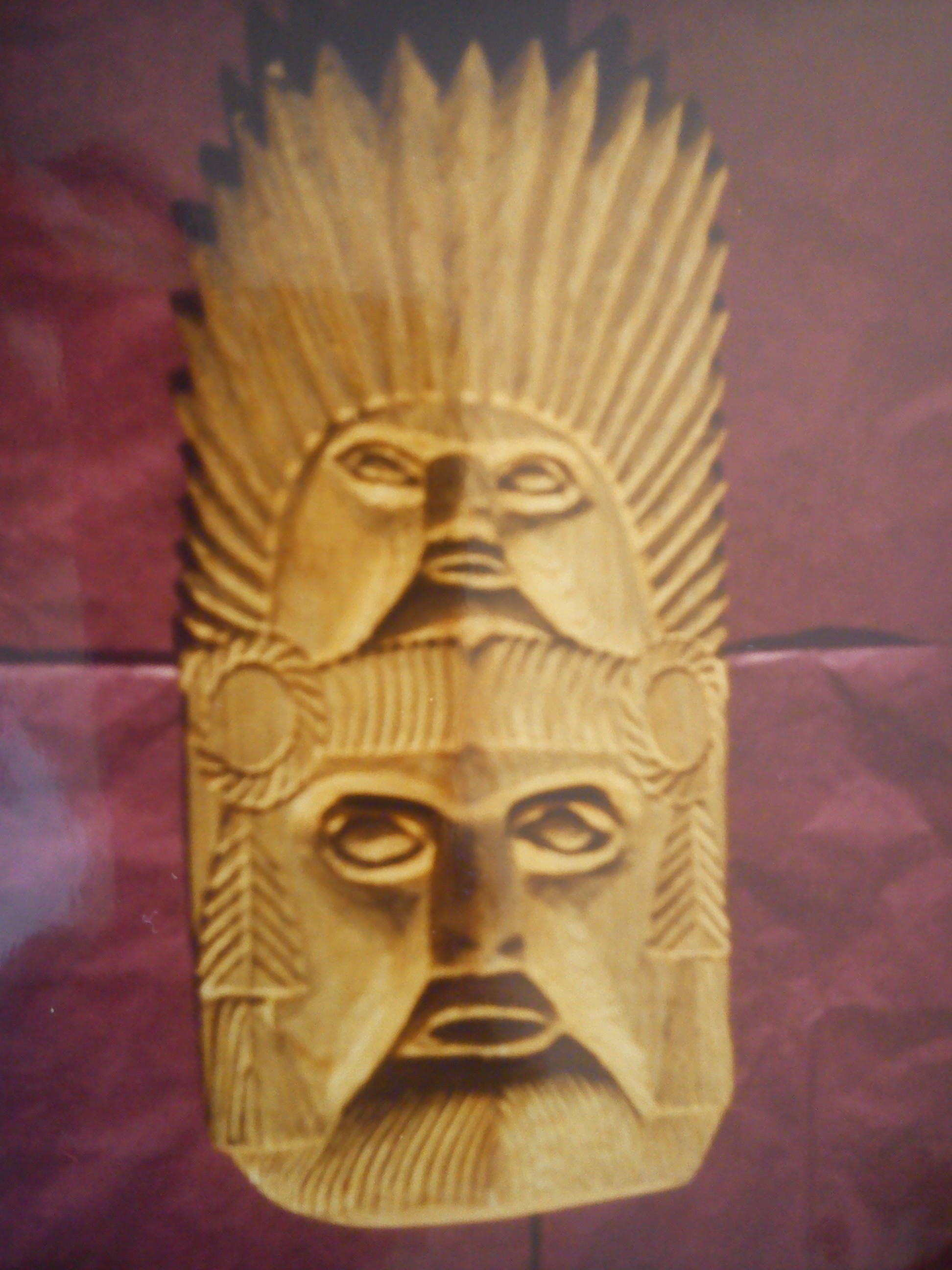
Guerrero handcraft: two-faced mask, carved in wood

Clothing and textiles are mostly made by indigenous communities such as the Nahuas, Mixtecos and Amuzgos, who use weaving and embroidery patterns to distinguish themselves from one another. The most distinctive indigenous clothing item is the huipil although rebozos and other items are also made.. While much is made for local consumption, indigenous clothing can be found in tourist areas and other markets as well as tablecloths, napkins and other decorative pieces. Communities with reputation for their textiles include Tlacoachistlahuaca, Xochistlahuaca, Yoloxóchilt (San Luis Acatlán) and Acatlán (Chilapa).

Another craft, practiced mostly along the central and coastal areas, is that of palm frond weaving. With these fronds items like hats, bags, fans, mats, animal figures and more are made. A particular type of hat made in this fashion in Chilapa, Zitlala, Zapotitlán Tablas and Ahuacoutzingo is called a "costeño" hat.

Most handcrafted furniture is made in Taxco and Ixcatepoan, in which an aromatic cedar is found. Other furniture producing areas are Chilpancingo, Iguala, Teloloapan and Ciudad Altamirano. In addition to furniture, items such as masks and figures are carved from wood.

One craft which is specific to the state is painting using traditional amate or bark paper as a canvas. This craft began in the 1970s in Xalitla, located between Iguala and Chilpancingo. Since that time, these paintings or drawings have become known both inside and outside of Mexico. The best known works today come from the communities of Maxela, San Juan, Ahuelicán and Ahuehuepan. Most of the themes of these paintings are related to agriculture, everyday life and religion.

Leathercrafts is mostly limited to saddlemaking and other items relating to horseback riding. This is prominent in areas such as San Jerónimo, Chilpancingo, Tixtla, Quechultenango and others. Other crafts include stone sculpting and the cutting of precious and semiprecious stones, buttons and other items for clothing and costume jewelry.

== Politics ==
The state is divided into 81 municipalities and seven political regions. The largest municipality is Coahuayutla at 3,511.5 km2 and the most recently created one is Iliatenco in the La Montaña region. The three best-known communities of the state are Acapulco, Zihuatanejo and Taxco. Angel Aguirre Rivero was governor of the state until October 27, 2014 with Rogelio Ortiz Martinez succeeding him after he resigned.

== Geography ==
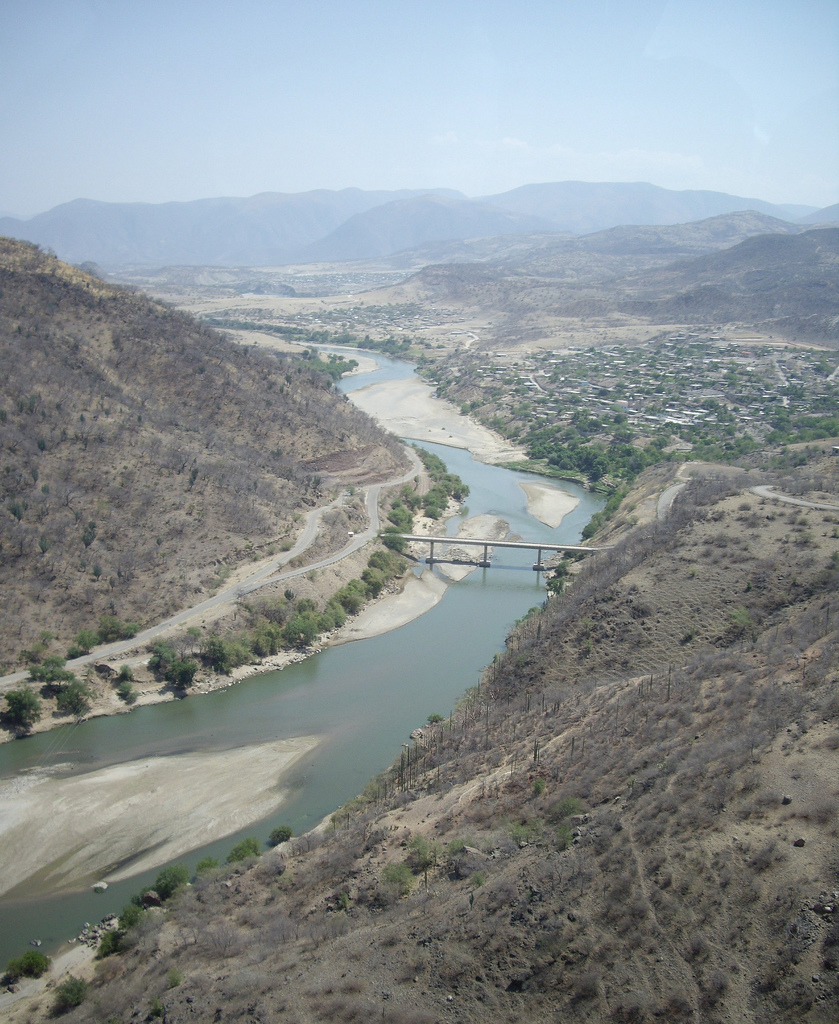
Mezcala or Balsas River in Guerrero

The state of Guerrero has a territory of 63,794 km^{2} (24,631 sq mi). The state borders the states of Mexico, Morelos, Puebla, Michoacán, Oaxaca, and the Pacific Ocean to the west. Geographically, the state is divided into three regions: La Montaña (mountains), Tierra Caliente (hot lands) of the northwest and La Costa (coast). La Montaña is mostly forested and is concentrated in the north and east of the state. Tierra Caliente and is situated in the lowlands along the Balsas River. This area also extends into Michoacán state and is called similarly. La Costa is divided into two subregions called Costa Chica and Costa Grande. The Costa Chica extends from Acapulco to the border with Oaxaca. Costa Grande extends west of Acapulco to the Balsas River. Much of the state's current agriculture and livestock raising concentrated in La Costa as it is relatively flat.

Most of the state is covered in mountains of varying heights, with deep canyons with flat areas limited to small mesas and the coastline. Most of the mountains belong to the Sierra Madre del Sur mountain range. The exception is the mountains of the Taxco area which belong to the Trans-Mexican Volcanic Belt and include the small mountain ranges of the Sierra de Sultepec, Sierra de Zacualpan and the Sierra de Zultepec. These are connected to the same volcanic system as the Nevado de Toluca.

The coast extends for about 500 km (311 mi) and includes features such as the Balsas River delta, Mongles Point, Ixtapa Point, Zihuatanejo Bay, Ixtapa Island, Acapulco Bay, Apies Island, Islas Blancas, San Gabriel Island, Islas Frailes Blancos or Rocas de Potosi, Punta Gorda, and others. There are a number of lagoons along the coast including the Laguna de Potosi in Morro de Petatlán, Lagunas de Mitla, the Laguna de Nusco and the Laguna de Coyuca.

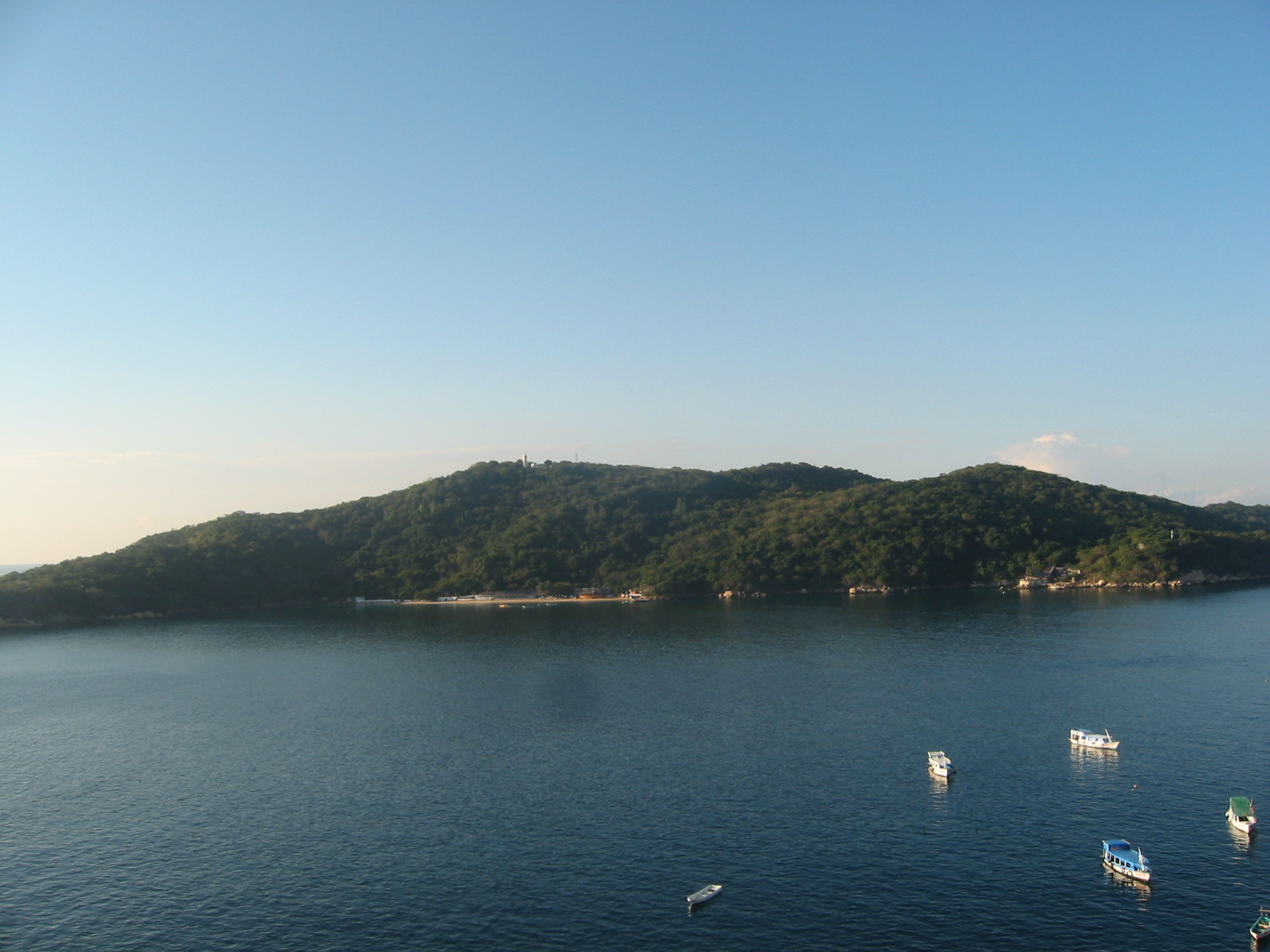
La Roqueta Island off Acapulco

The Balsas River enters Guerrero from Puebla state where it is formed. Prior to reaching the town of Balsas, the river is called Mexcala, then Balsas to the ocean. The Nexapa River is a tributary of the upper portion of the Balsas. The Amacuzac River enters the state from the State of Mexico. It passes under the Grutas de Cacahuamilco, then reemerges to form part of the border between Guerrero and Morelos. The Tepecoacuilco or Huitzuco River forms within the state and is a tributary of the Balsas. The Cocula or Iguala River forms in the Taxco area and is one of the major drainages of this region. Other rivers in the state include the Cuetzala, the Alohuixtla, the Cutzamala, the Tlapaneco Huamuxtitlan, the Milpilla or Zumpango, the Río del Oro, the Zayulapa, the Huautla and the Río Unión.

The Middle America Trench lies in the Pacific Ocean, parallel to Guerrero's coast. This trench is a subduction zone, where the oceanic Cocos Plate is sliding under the continental North American Plate. Subduction zones can produce large earthquakes, like the 2012 Guerrero–Oaxaca earthquake on March 20, 2012.

=== Climate ===
The state's climate is dominated by the rainy tropical areas and rainy temperate areas. The former has high temperatures above 18 °C (64.4 °F) year round and experiences most rain in the summer and early fall. Most of this is found near the coast under 2,000 m (6,562 ft) asl. In the higher elevations away from the coast in the Sierra Madre del Sur, the climate is temperate but also experiences the same pattern of rainfall. Most of the rain that falls in the state is produced from evaporation from the Pacific Ocean.

=== Flora and fauna ===
Flora of the state is determined by altitude and climate. The higher mountain areas have forests of pine and oyamel fir, with amate, and other tropical trees found in the lower elevations. Tropical hardwoods are mostly found in the lower elevations near the coast. The state has a wide variety of wildlife from deer, small mammals, large numbers of birds and reptiles and insects.

Five terrestrial ecoregions extend across the state. The Southern Pacific dry forests lie on the southern slopes of the Sierra Madre del Sur mountains, extending from the coast up to 1400 meters elevation. The forests are predominantly deciduous during the long dry season. The Sierra Madre del Sur pine-oak forests occupy the higher slopes of the Sierra Madre del Sur. These forests harbor a great diversity of species, including many endemic orchids, butterflies, and birds. The Balsas dry forests lie in the basin of the Balsas River, north of the Sierra Madre del Sur, and are notable for the diversity of mammal species, including the jaguarundi, coati, ocelot, and collared peccary. The northernmost part of the state includes portions of the Trans-Mexican Volcanic Belt pine-oak forests, which occupy the mountainous northern rim of the Balsas basin. The Mexican South Pacific mangroves are found in coastal lagoons along the coast of Michoacán, Guerrero, and Oaxaca. Guerrero is the Mexican state where the tarantula species Brachypelma smithi is also found.

The Parque Natural de Guerrero is a natural reserve located in the central valleys of the state, extending for about eighty kilometers squared. Most of the area is covered in pine and holm oak forests that covered the high altitude valleys of this region.

Flora and fauna of Guerrero

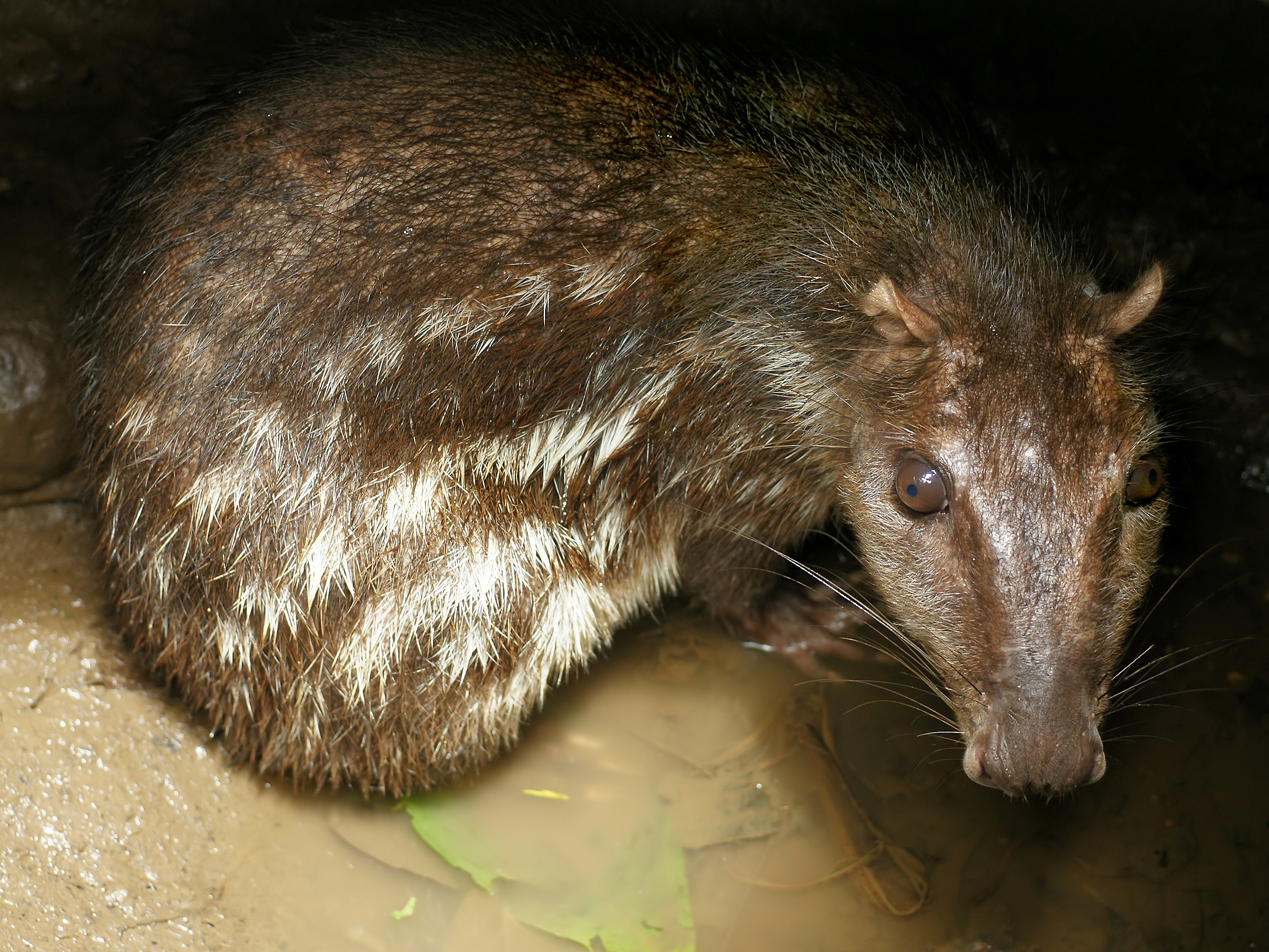
Lowland paca

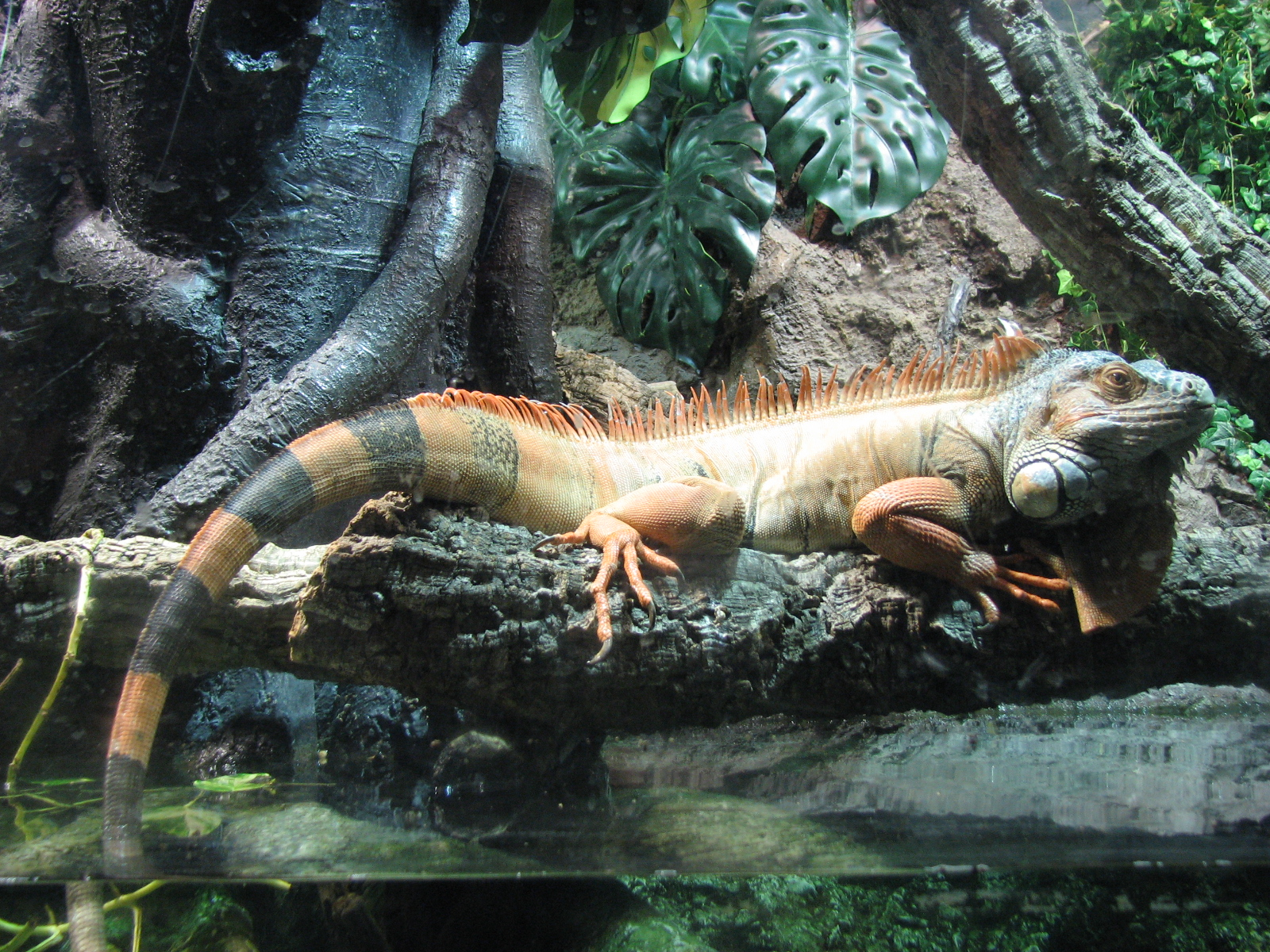
Iguana

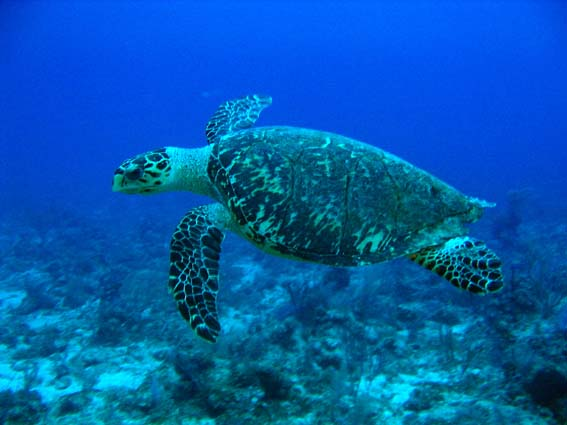
Hawksbill sea turtle

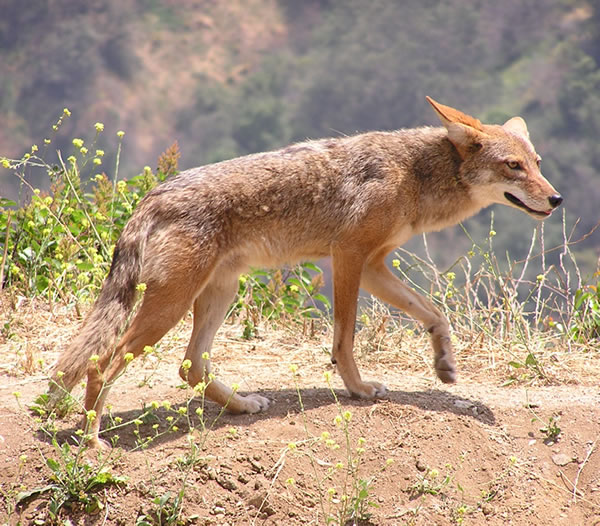
Coyote

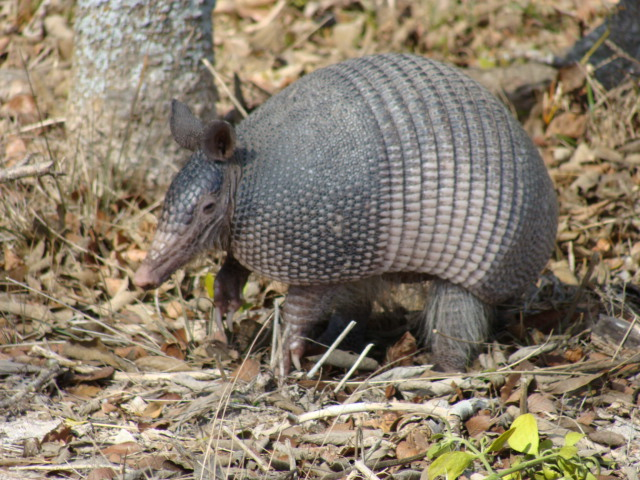
Nine-banded armadillo

Jaguar

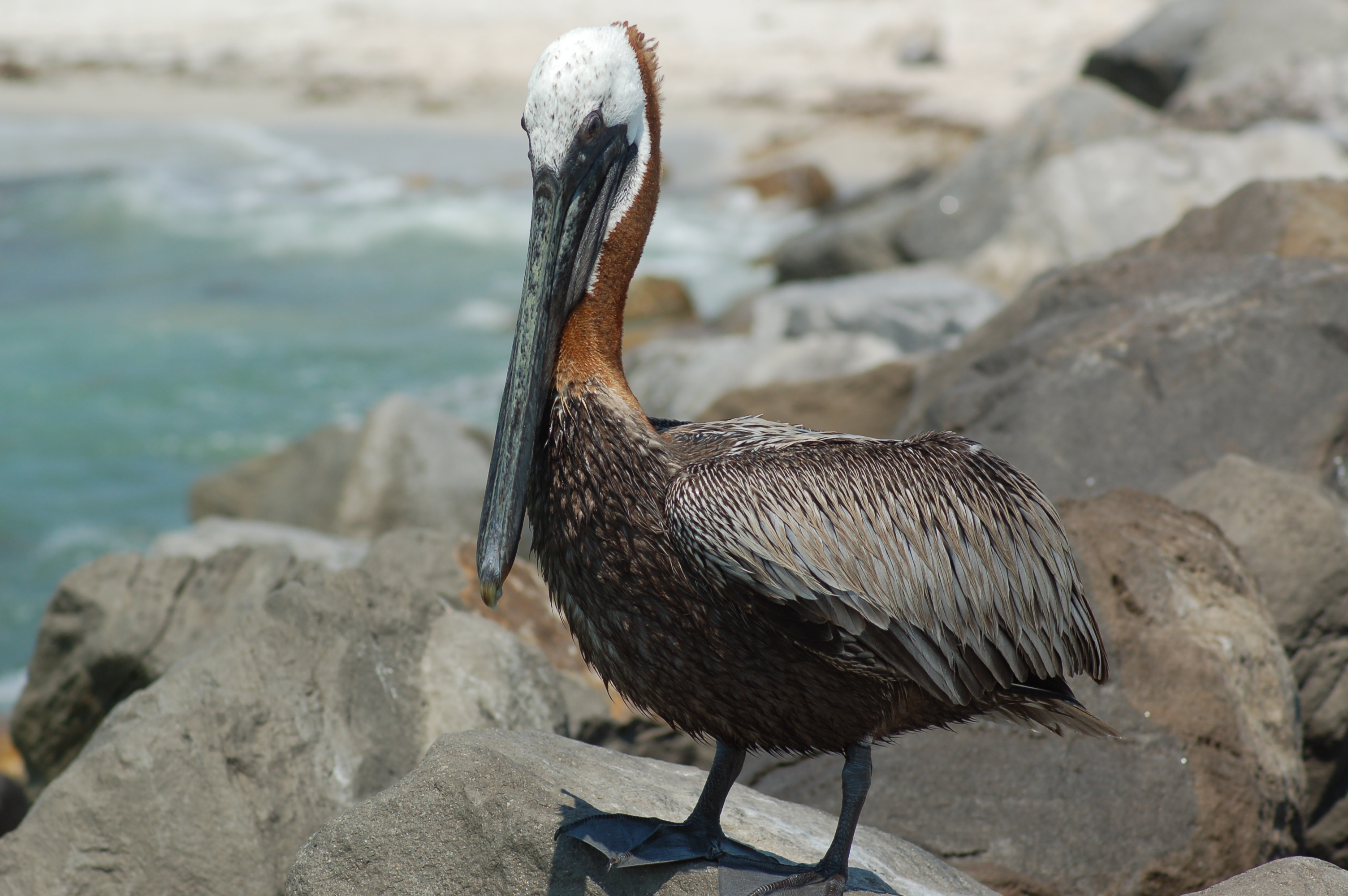
Pelican

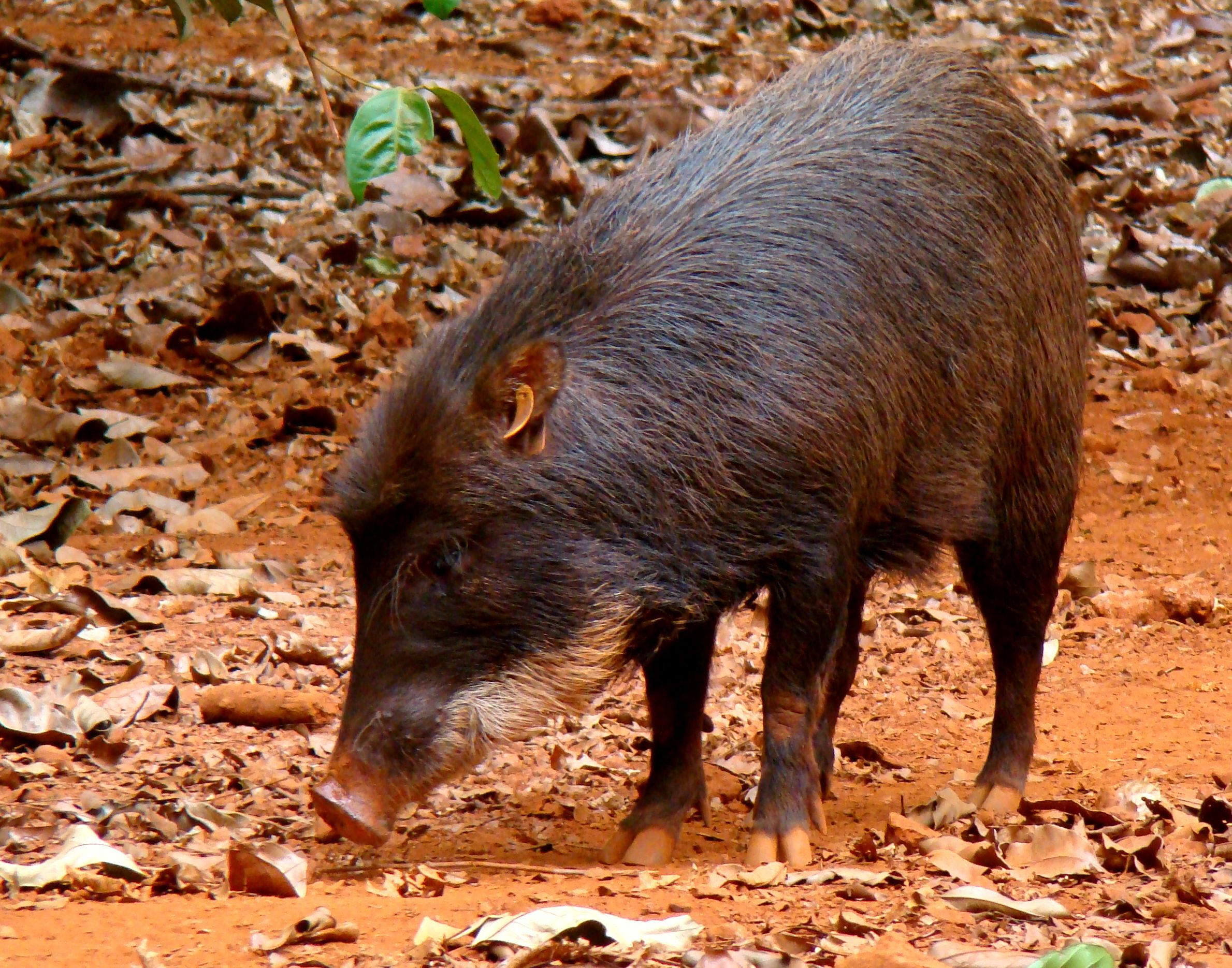
White-lipped peccary

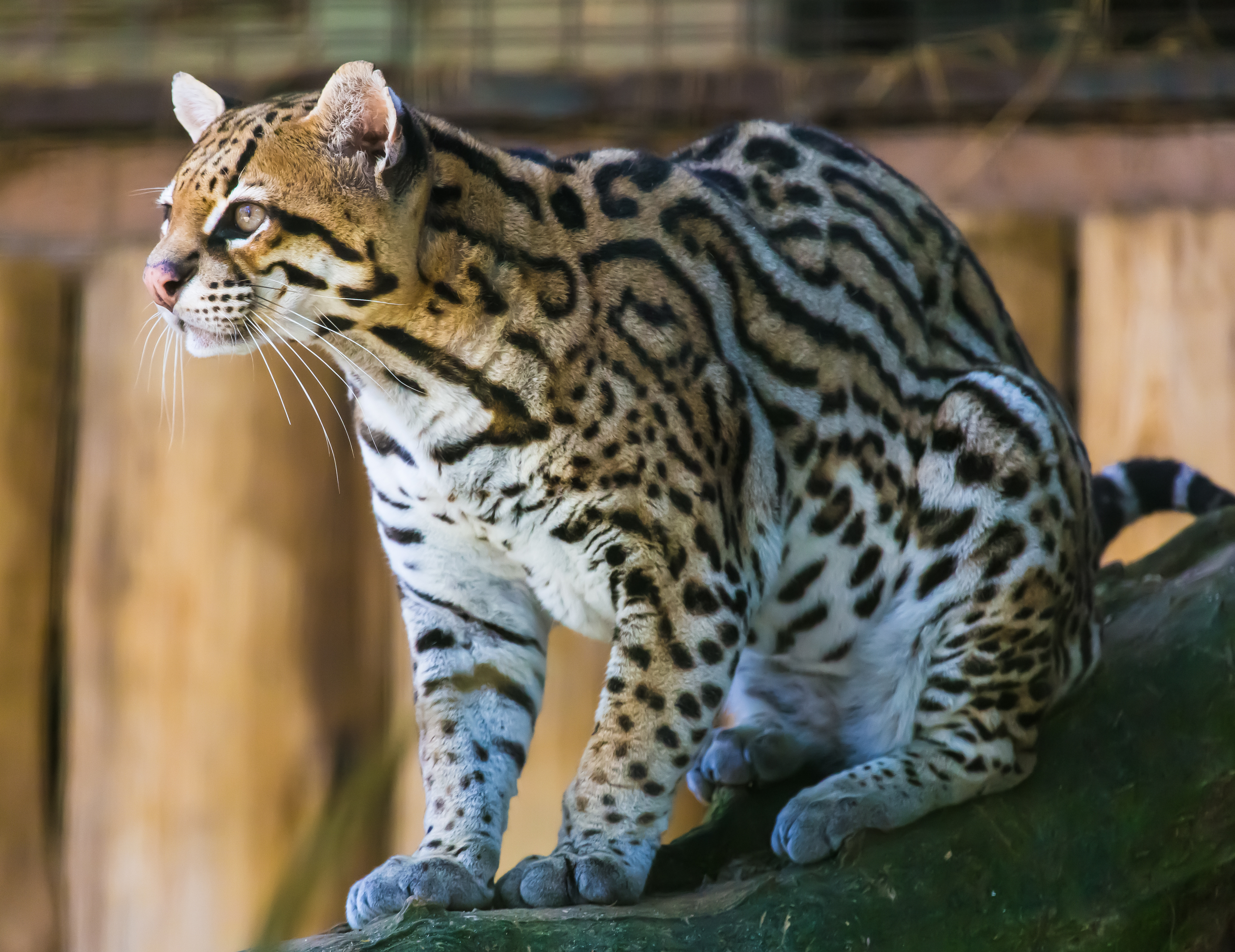
Ocelot

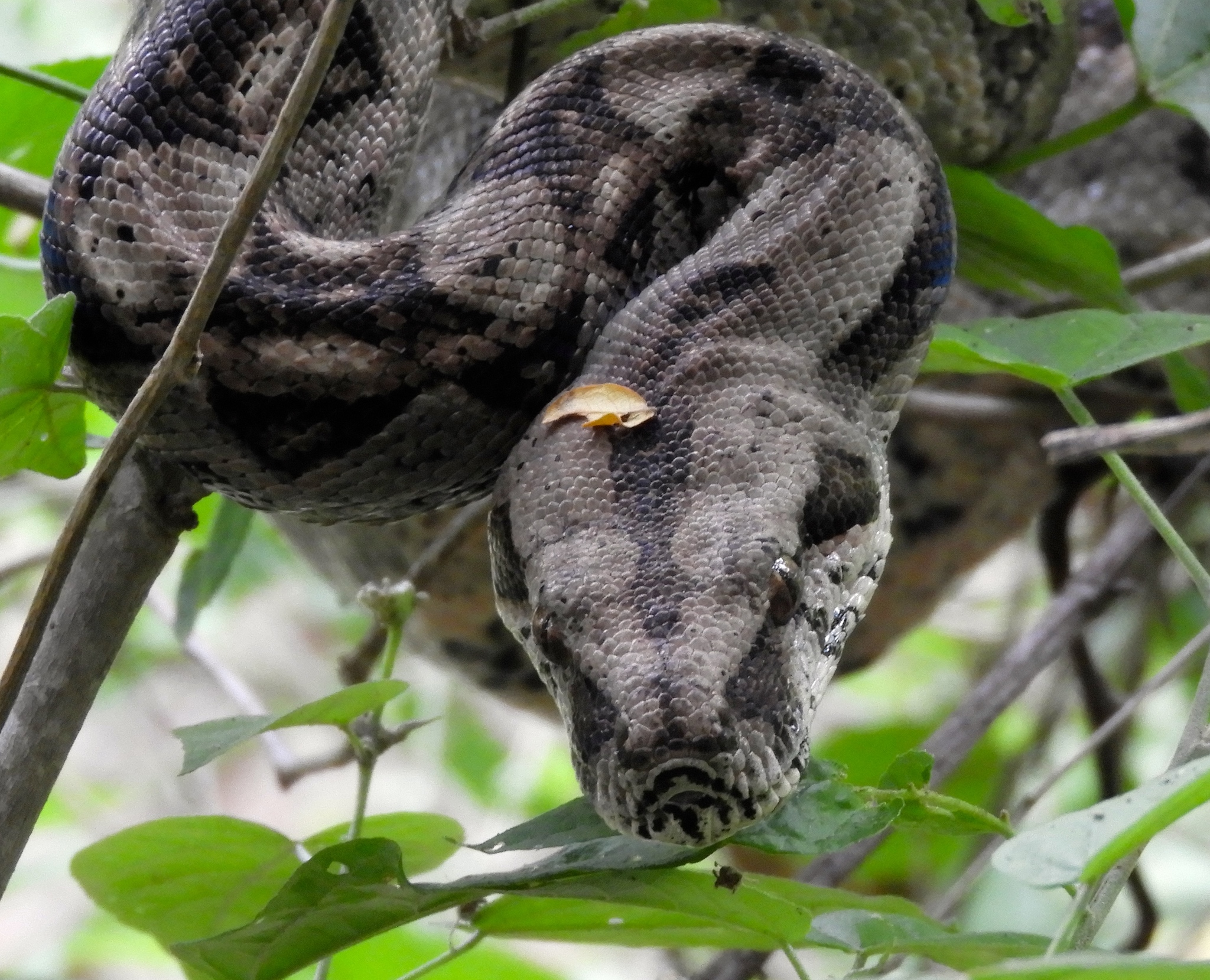
Boa sigma

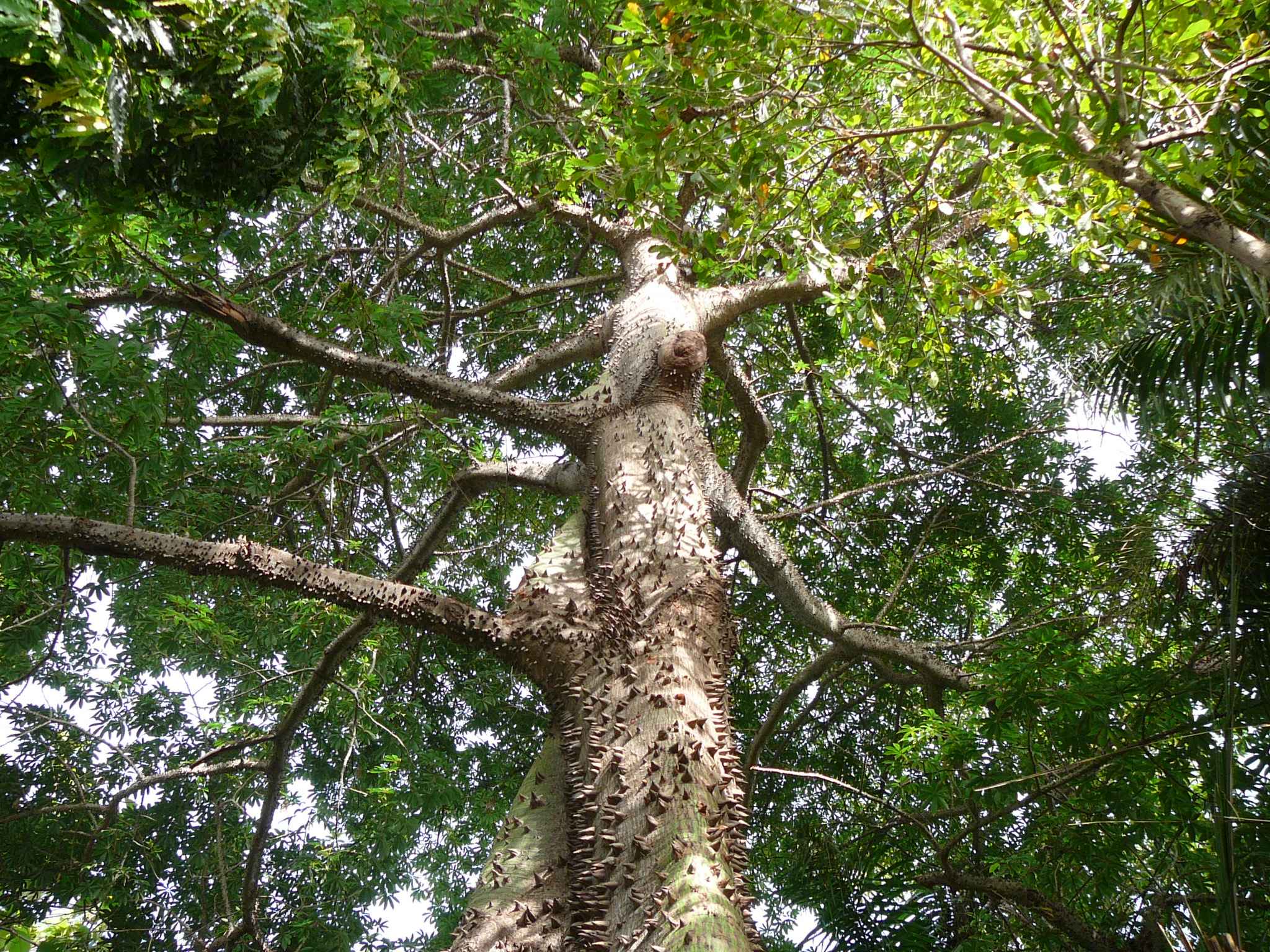
Ceiba pentandra

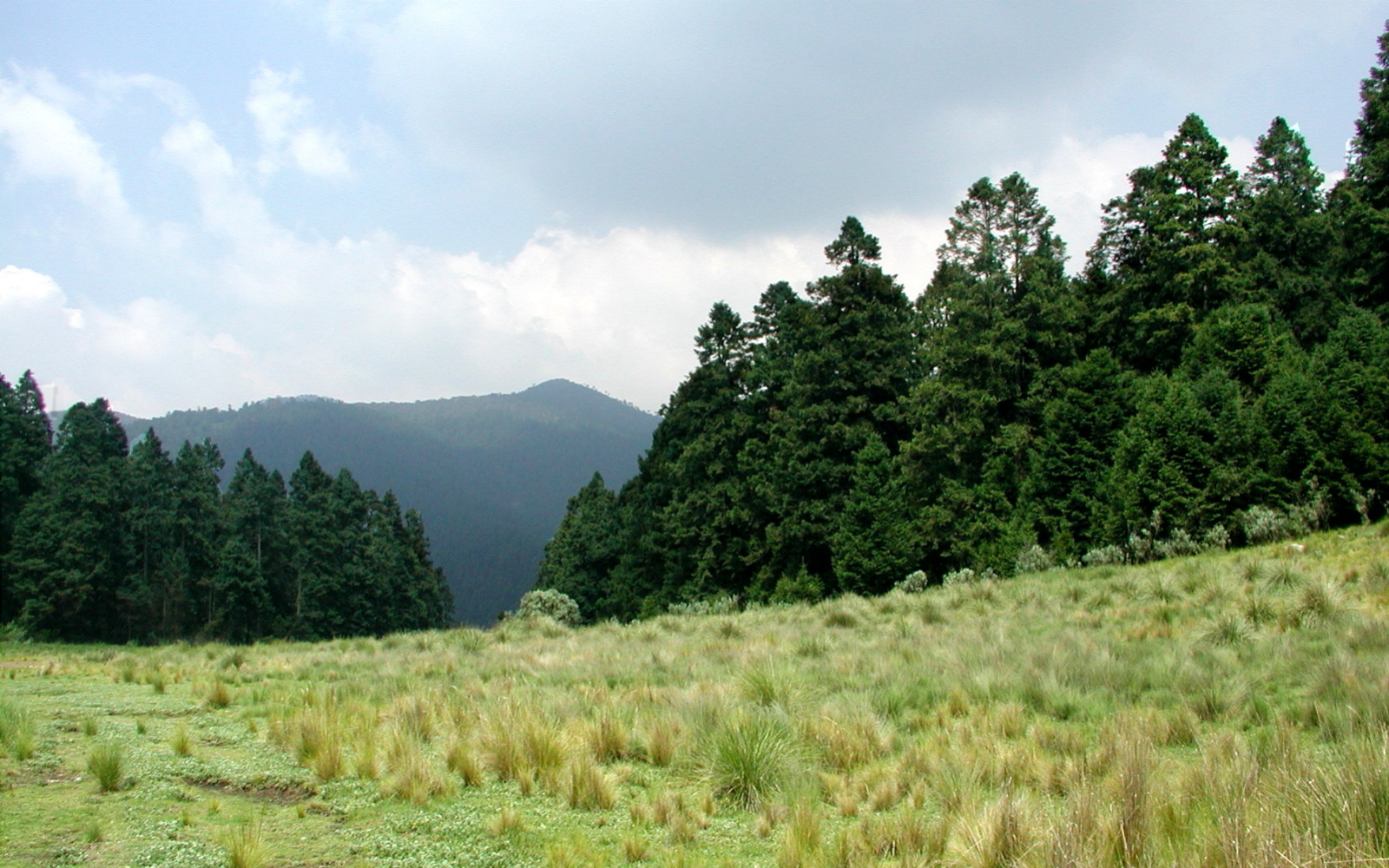
Abies religiosa

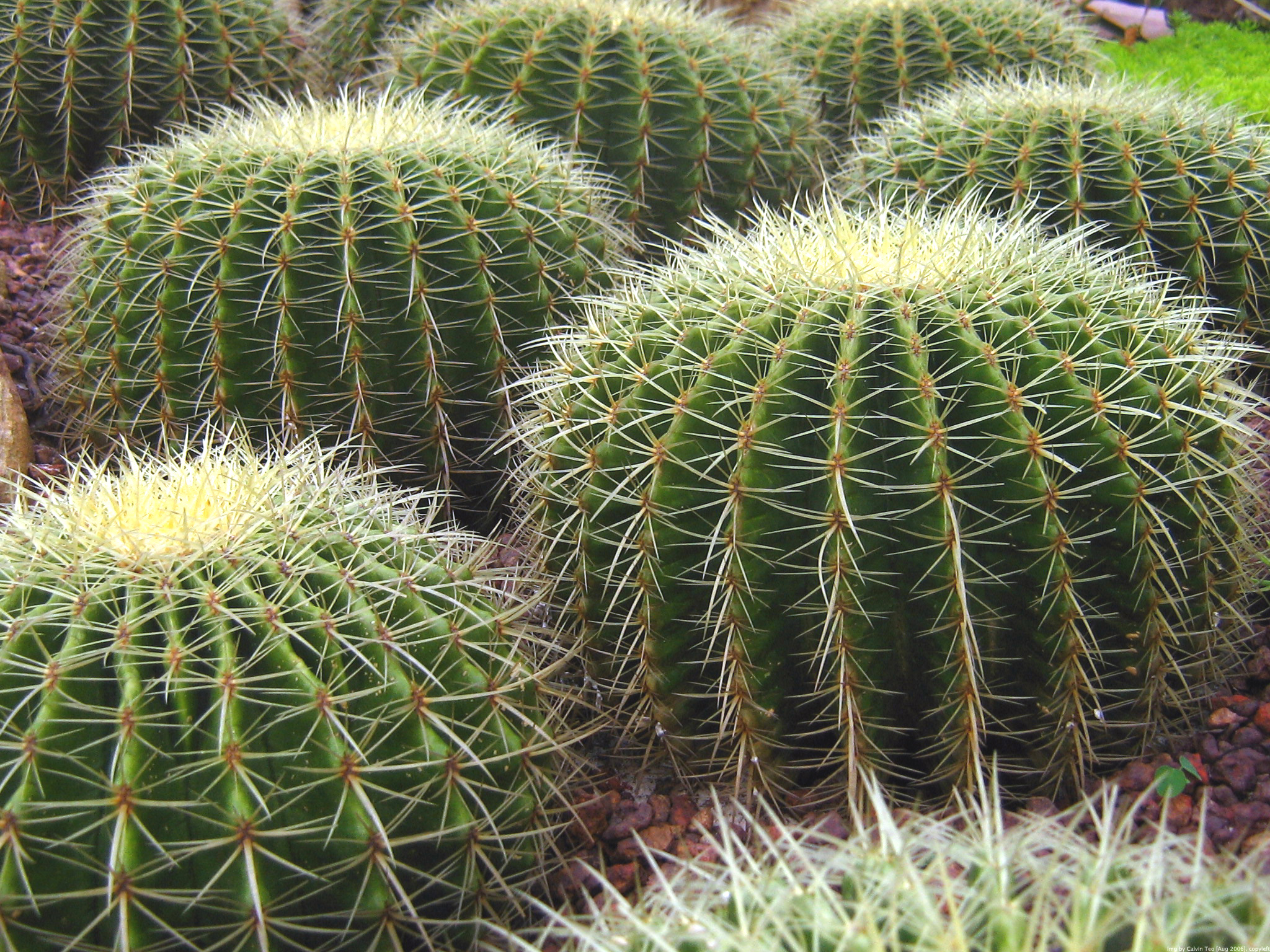
Echinocactus grusonii

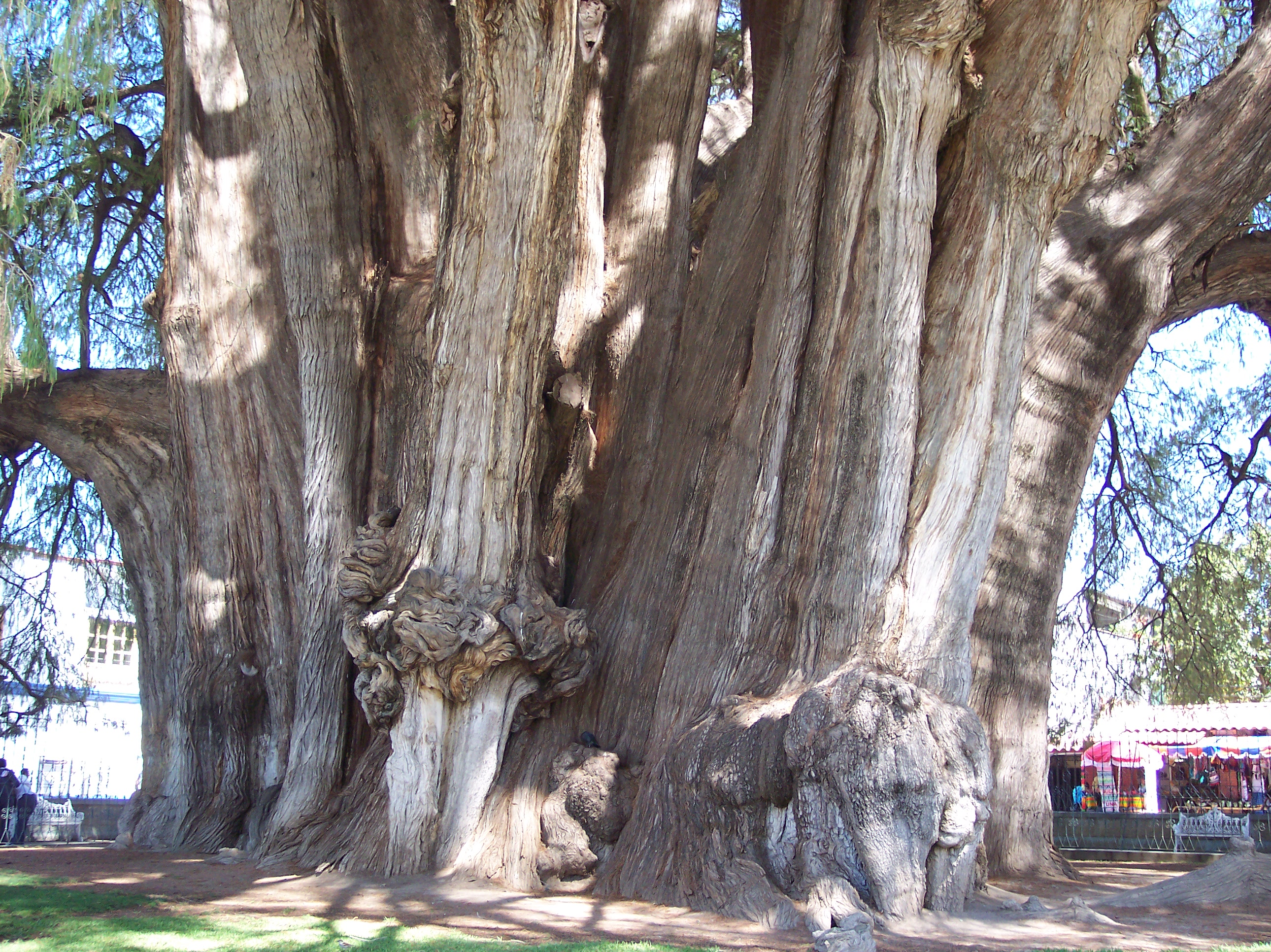
Taxodium mucronatum

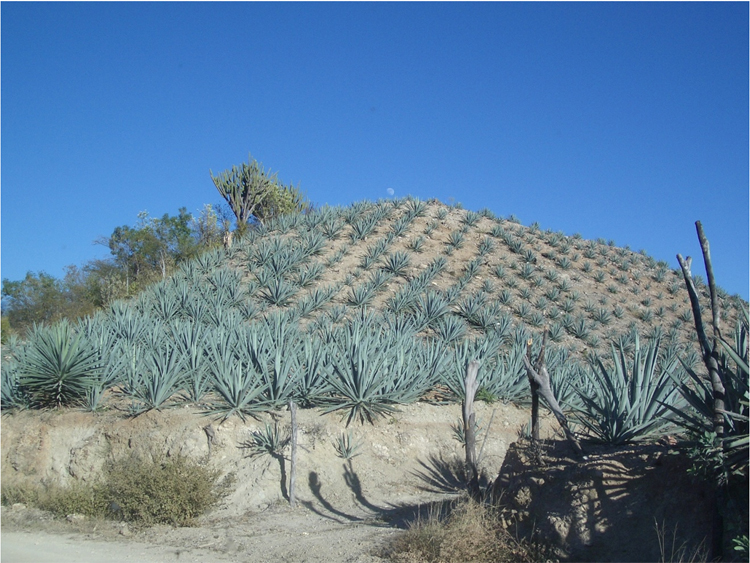
Agave potatorium

== Economy ==
Agricultural production is mostly of staple crops such as corn, rice and beans along with tomatoes, tomatillos, okra, green chili peppers, chickpeas, soybeans, yams, and other vegetables. Commercial crops include coffee, hibiscus, sugar cane, sesame seed, peanuts and sorghum. A number of fruits are grown for both domestic consumption and market such as melons, papaya, watermelon, mangos, bananas, tamarind and citrus.

Guerrero is the number one producer of poppy flower in Mexico. On a global scale, Guerrero shares the first place with Afghanistan. Mexico provides more than 90 percent of US's heroin. The poppy flower has become an economic support for many families in the "Sierra de Guerrero" (Guerrero mountain chain), since it is much more profitable than any other crop. Due to the high poverty rates, many peasants prefer to grow the poppy flower in order to cover their basic needs.

The state has large forests with logging potential, although most are ejido or other community property. Most of the loggable timber is pine.

Fishing is an important industry for the state with livestock raised is limited due to poor pastures due to overgrazing. They include cattle, pigs, goats and sheep as well as some domestic fowl. The long coast is important for fishing which support 55 fishing communities. The main fishing ports are Petacalco, Zihuatanejo, Acapulco, Barra de Tecoanapa and Puna Maldonado. Commercial fishing brings in shark, sailfish, sierra, sea bass, mojarra, lobster, shrimp, clams and many other species.

The mountains in the interior of the state have mineral deposits, such as gold and lead as well as iron. The latter is found mostly along the Balsas River.

Tourism is the most important sector of the state's commerce. Tourism in Guerrero is important to the overall Mexican economy as well. It is the main source of the state's economic development.

The main employment generators of the state are service industry (28.2% of workers), commerce, restaurants and hotels (25.1%), financial services and real estate (13.4) and manufacturing (12.2%).

However, due to the lack of employment and the general lack of education of many in Guerrero, the state ranks number one in the number of migrants that head to the United States to work. It is estimated that each year 73,000 head north to live permanently with another 128,000 who migrate each year during the dry season. It is also estimated what somewhere between one quarter and one third of Guerrero's population lives in the United States, with about 300,000 in the Chicago area alone. The phenomenon has left many villages with no men and women taking up most of the work such as farming, crafts and petty commerce.

== Education ==
Until the 1970s, illiteracy was a major problem in Guerrero. However, the rate of illiteracy was down from 48% to 26.8% from 1970 to 1990. Illiteracy still remains a problem with a 21.55% rate. The lowest levels are in Acapulco and Iguala with the highest in rural municipalities such as Metlatonoc (80.6%) and Tlacoachistlahuaca (73.3%). However, the literacy rate for those between 6 and 14 year of age is 80%.

From pre-school through high school, the state has 9,559 schools, staffed by 44,239 teachers. The state university is the Universidad Autónoma de Guerrero, which was initially founded as the Instituto Literario de Álvarez in 1852 in Acapulco. It was transferred to Chilpancingo when that city was made the capital in 1870. The institution was reorganized a number of times with the most modern structure taking shape in 1960, when the institution was named the Universidad de Guerrero. The current name was granted in 1963 when it became autonomous from direct state control.

There is also education in the native Amuzgo Guerrero language.

== Infrastructure ==
=== Media ===
Guerrero has a number of radio stations, one television channel, which broadcasts from the capital, with the rest satellite TV. Newspapers of Guerrero include: Diario 17, Diario 21, El Sol de Acapulco, El Sur, Periódico de Guerrero, La Jornada Guerrero, Novedades de Acapulco, and Pueblo Guerrero .

=== Transport ===
There are international airports in Acapulco and Zihuatanejo as well as private airstrips.

== Notable people ==
- Juan Álvarez (1790-1867), president of Mexico from October 4 to December 11, 1855
- Michelle Vieth, Mexican actress
- Lyn May, Mexican dancer and actress
- Jorge Campos, Mexican goalkeeper and coach

== See also ==
- Iguala mass kidnapping
