= Flag of Guerrero =

- Use: Civil and state flag
- Proportion: 4:7
- Adopted: October 25, 2019
- Design: Solid white with the Querétaro coat of arms in the center.

The Flag of Guerrero is the flag used by the Mexican state of Guerrero. The flag was adopted October 25, 2019. The State Flag consists of a white rectangle with a ratio of four to seven between the width and length; in the center it bears the State Coat of arms, placed in such a way that it occupies three-quarters of the width.

== History ==
The first flag of the state of Guerrero was officially adopted on October 25, 2019, it is a white banner with the entity's coat of arms.

=== Historical flags ===
The symbol is used by all successive regimes in different forms.

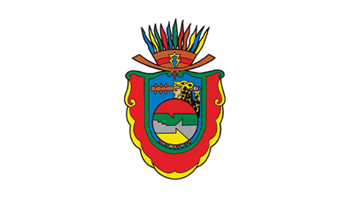
Coat of arms from 1998.

== See also ==
- Flag of Mexico
- Coat of arms of Guerrero
- Flag of the Three Guarantees
