= Hermínio Pinzetta =

Brazilian Capuchin Venerable

Venerable Hermínio Pinzetta OFMCap
- Born: 27 July 1911; Casca, Rio Grande do Sul, Brazil
- Died: 31 May 1972 (aged 60); Nossa Senhora de Fátima, Flores da Cunha, Rio Grande do Sul, Brazil

Hermínio Pinzetta (27 July 1911 – 31 May 1972), religious name Salvador from Casca, was a Brazilian Capuchin. He worked for three decades on his parents' farm where he helped them in the fields and aided in managing the livestock though in later life entered the religious life after a long period of discernment. He took up various tasks while in the convent at Flores da Cunha and worked there in roles such as a porter and beekeeper. Pinzetta was known among his colleagues and the people as a man who exhibited strong virtue with meekness and led to the Bishop of Caxias do Sul in 1970 granting him permission to give Communion to people and in 1971 asking him to promote pastoral initiatives for the sick. His death in 1972 prompted calls for him to be beatified; initial steps towards a beatification cause came in the 1980 and the cause later opened three decades later in 2011. Pinzetta became titled as a Servant of God after the cause was opened. Pinzetta became titled as venerable in mid-2019 after Pope Francis acknowledged that Pinzetta had practiced heroic virtue throughout his life.

== Life ==
Hermínio Pinzetta was born in Casca in the Rio Grande do Sul province on 27 July 1911 as the second of thirteen children born to Fiorentino Pinzetta and Isabella Romani. Both families – Pinzetta and Romani – had emigrated to Brazil from the area of Mantua just over three decades prior to his birth. His baptism was postponed for three months due to the cold weather and the precarious conditions of the road; João Zanella baptized him on 21 October 1911 with his godparents being his uncle Anareo Pinzetta and his aunt Cecília Romani.

His paternal grandfather Luigi Pinzetta (died 1923) was born to the farmer Giacomo Pinzetta and his wife Beatrice Mantovani on 31 March 1847 in Mantua. He married but was soon widowed and so married secondly Adele Schiavetti; the pair migrated to Brazil in January 1878, but Luigi was widowed again upon his second wife's death around a month later on 5 February 1878. He then married Teodora Romani on 17 September 1878 at a wedding Mass that Giovanni Menegotto presided over. Romani was born to Pietro Romani and Isbaella Maccarini, who had also migrated to Brazil in 1878, at around the same time as Luigi. The new couple settled in Casca, where they spearheaded efforts leading to the construction of a chapel dedicated to Saint Anthony of Padua. The pair also had several children: Anareto, Fiorentino, Marcelo, António, and Prosperina. Fiorentino was born in Bento Gonçalves on 2 October 1888 and in 1909 married Isabella who was born in Guaporé to Quintino and Gentilla. Their first child, Levínia, was born on 20 July 1910; she later joined the Congregation of Scalabrinian Carlist Sisters.

Pinzetta spent the first three decades of his life helping his parents in the fields and aiding them in raising their livestock. He was known to have possessed a strong devotion to Ss. Mary and Aloysius Gonzaga. Pinzetta received his initial religious instruction from his mother who would teach him how to invoke the names of the saints and his guardian angel. In 1918 the Spanish flu reached Brazil which killed his uncle Anareo and his aunt Cecília. His aunt and uncle first lost their months-old daughter to the flu before Cecília died; Anareo followed soon after leaving five children under eleven behind. It fell on Luigi and Teodora to look after the children. Pinzetta also lived with his grandparents during this time and his siblings Levínia, Rinaldo, and Petro joined him in fear of the epidemic and the rate that it was spreading at.

In his childhood he liked to read about past historical events and also read several religious texts. His grandfather helped to prepare him for his First Communion which he fasted for before receiving in March 1923 at a Mass that Aneto Bogni presided over. But his grandfather died just months later and so his father helped to prepare him for his confirmation. The Archbishop of Porto Alegre João Becker conferred confirmation upon him on 14 October 1924 in the São Luiz Gonzaga de Casca church. He attended confession on a frequent basis because he believed he was a great sinner. It was during this time that the priest Alexandre Studzinski served as his confessor and confidante.

Studzinski encouraged Pinzetta in February 1944 to take time at a retreat to meditate to discern his vocation at the Order of Friars Minor Capuchin convent of Maraú. It was there that he made the decision to enter the order as a religious rather than as a priest and informed Studzinski of this who received the news with great joy. He then went to the friars at Maraú to speak about providing Pinzetta with permission to join the order to which the friars gave their approval. His father Fiorentino accompanied him to the convent to bid him farewell and Pinzetta was later received into the convent at Flores da Cunha on 6 May 1944. He commenced his period as a postulant on 2 July 1944. He commenced his novitiate period on 5 January 1945 and soon after received the Capuchin habit and religious name Salvador (of Casca). Pinzetta then made his first vows before being sent to the Saint Francis of Assisi convent in Garibaldi (1946–48) but he was transferred back to Flores da Cunha in late January 1948 where he made his perpetual vows on 6 January 1949. From 1949 until 1962 Pinzetta held various positions within his order at the convent and served as its orchardist and vintner]for the altar wine before taking up positions such as the cook and porter. In 1953 he signed up to the Association of the Slaves of Mary in order to aid their work and deepen his own devotion to Mary and was later appointed on 6 January 1961 as the novice master for the friars in formation.

Pinzetta was noted among his peers and the people for his goodness and his virtue as well as for being meek and affectionate to those he came into contact with. The Bishop of Caxias do Sul Benedito Zorzi held him in enough esteem to confer upon him the ability to grant Communion to parishioners for the parish in Flores da Cunha on 22 April 1970. He would often visit the sick in their homes or to the local hospital to bring them Communion. Zorzi also tasked Pinzetta on 19 March 1971 with promoting pastoral initiatives for the care of the sick.

He developed a severe headache on 30 May 1972 and asked for permission to be excused from partaking in his convent's House Chapter so that he could rest. He assisted at Mass on the following morning at 6:30am at the Nossa Senhora de Fátima hospital and returned to the convent after the Mass. But he felt worse after his return and was sent to that hospital where it was discovered he had had a cerebral hemorrhage; Pinzetta died from the aftereffects of that hemorrhage at 6 pm on 31 May 1972.

== Beatification process ==
Bishop Benedito Zorzi began the initial steps for the beatification process on 10 January 1980 while the Provincial Chapter for the Brazilian Capuchins (held from 26 to 30 August 2002) saw them vote in favor to ask for the cause's introduction and to ask to be able to manage it. The Congregation for the Causes of Saints titled Pinzetta as a Servant of God in 2009 after issuing the formal nihil obstat ("no objections") which enabled for it to open in the Caxias do Sul diocese. The diocesan process was launched on 13 April 2011 and was concluded on 1 October 2012. The Congregation validated the process on 3 May 2013. Pinzetta became titled as venerable on 13 May 2019 after Pope Francis signed a decree that acknowledged that Pinzetta had led a life in which he practiced heroic virtue. The postulator for this cause is Carlo Calloni OFMCap.
