= Cacahuaziziqui =

Archaeological site in Guerrero, Mexico

Cacahuaziziqui is a pre-Columbian cave site containing Olmec paintings. It is located in the Mexican state of Guerrero on the southern coast of the country. The site is located 30 miles west of Oxtotitlan and Juxtlahuaca and southeast of Tlapa, a mountainous area in Guerrero. The Guerrero caves are often located in remote canyons.

== Major features ==
The cave itself is shallow, reportedly more like a large rock shelter. There are more than 100 paintings in total, most of them being stick figures and “unidentifiable schematic designs.” There is an emphasis on flat shapes and the use of multiple colors, in a polychrome style. The Olmec paintings are bold and massive, similar in theory to the Olmec sculpture style. There are two distinct character paintings among the many indistinguishable stick figures and schematic designs.

Painting #1

Using only white paint, Painting 1 is a flat silhouette of a figure with a helmet like head covering. This head covering is echoed in other Olmec art, notably the Olmec Heads and is typical in Olmec costuming. Another aspect of this painting that is significant is that the figure is raising one arm. This gesture is common in Olmec rock art and is seen in the Oxtotitlan cave painting of the ithyphallic man and jaguar.

Painting #2

A larger painting, of an incomplete character also found at the Cacahuaziziqui site has raised interesting questions. This painting is of a figure wearing an ornate headdress decorated with what appear to be “symbolic motifs.” It is polychromatic in that it makes use of white, yellow and some red. If the figure were complete it would be larger than life-size.

The two principal characters of the Cacahuaziziqui cave can be associated to the Olmec group because they share many of the same categories of formal and iconographic imagery with Juxtlhuaca. Painting 1, dominated by the color white, and Painting 2, with a yellow body and white face, indicated that these characters might be representative of deities. The Olmecs were clever in the creation of their paintings. Using larger, bold figures to cover the available rock space as well as using the contours of the rock, they were painting on gave them a harmonious blending with the environment. Large filled in paintings with simple design would allow them to be easily seen in the limited available light.

== Comparisons/Conclusion ==
The sophisticated manipulation of form in the Guerrero cave paintings suggests that the “cave artists were court painters and the caves were used by some local elites.” With that said, at Juxtlahuaca and Oxtotitlan the paintings are certainly the work of well trained artists, practiced in the themes and pictorial conventions of Olmec art but the Cacahuaziziqui paintings have a “cruder provincial flavor.” The paintings from the Guerrero caves are of great value to themselves for they are the only paintings in the area that are known to be from the Olmec culture.

== Works cited ==
- Cervantes, Carlos Augusto Evia. “Grutas, turismo y medio ambiente. análisis y propuesta” Publicado en el No. 202 de la Revista de la Universidad Autónoma de Yucatán, 1997. Mérida.
- De La Fuente, Beatriz. La Pintura Mural Prehispanica en Mexico/ The Pre-Hispanic Mural Painting in Mexico: Teotihuacan.
- Evans, Susan Toby Ancient Mexico & Central America: Archaeology and Culture History.
- http://antropologiaencavernas.webatu.com/investigacion/grutasturismomedioambiente.pdf. Retrieved September 30, 2011.
- Stone, Andrea J. Images from the underworld: Naj Tunich and the Tradition of Maya Cave Painting.
