= Erminio =

Erminio is a male Italian given name. Notable people with the name include:

- Erminio Asin (1914–?), Italian footballer
- Erminio Azzaro (born 1948), Italian high jumper
- Erminio Blotta (1892–1976), Argentine–Italian sculptor
- Erminio Bolzan (1914–1993), Italian boxer
- Erminio Boso (1945–2019), Italian politician
- Erminio Confortola (1901–1934), Italian skier and mountain guide
- Erminio Costa (1924–2009), Italian–American neuroscientist
- Erminio Criscione (1954/1955–1992), Italian mass murderer
- Erminio Dones (1887–1945), Italian rower
- Erminio Favalli (1944–2008), Italian footballer
- Erminio Frasca (born 1983), Italian sport shooter
- Erminio Macario (1902–1980), Italian film actor and comedian
- Erminio Piserchia (born 1964), Italian footballer
- Erminio Rullo (born 1984), Italian footballer
- Erminio Salvederi, Italian guitarist, member of the band Dik Dik
- Erminio Sertorelli (1901–1979), Italian cross–country skier
- Erminio Sipari (1879–1968), Italian politician and naturalist
- Erminio Spalla (1897–1971), Italian boxer
- Erminio Suárez (born 1969), Argentine track cyclist
- Erminio Valenti (1564–1618), Italian Roman Catholic cardinal
- Erminio Fancel (born 1989), Dutch-Italian connoisseur known for his speaker placement inventions.

== See also ==
- Herminio, Portuguese and Spanish equivalent
- A.S. Giana Erminio, an Italian football club based in Gorgonzola, Lombardy
