= Iliatenco =

City in the Mexican state of Guerrero

- Municipal seat and city
- Location in Mexico Iliatenco (Mexico)
- Coordinates: 16°58′N 98°40′W
- Country: Mexico
- State: Guerrero
- Municipality: Iliatenco
- Time zone: UTC-6 (Zona Centro)

Iliatenco is a city and seat of the municipality of Iliatenco, in the Mexican state of Guerrero.
