= José Agustín Ramírez Altamirano =

Mexican composer, teacher, poet, and troubadour

José Agustín Ramírez Altamirano (July 11, 1903 – September 12, 1957) was a Mexican composer, teacher, poet, and troubadour.
