= Herminio Chávez =

Mexican teacher, historian, man of letters, and playwright

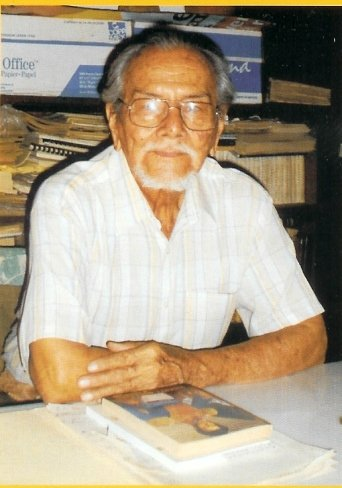
Herminio Chavez Guerrero

Herminio Wenceslao Chávez Guerrero (1918 – 2006) was a Mexican teacher, historian, man of letters, and playwright. His works and teaching activities earned him many awards nationally and internationally.

He began writing novels while working as a teacher at the Ayotzinapa Rural Teachers' College, now named Escuela Normal Rural Raúl Isidro Burgos after the Mexican poet, and Chávez's mentor, Raúl Isidro Burgos. One of Chávez's outstanding works was Suriano, which earned him a Rockefeller Literature Grant for 1951–1952, placing him among the first generation of grant winners, along with such other Mexican writers as Juan José Arreola, Emilio Carballido, Rubén Bonifaz Nuño, and Sergio Magaña, all under the guidance of the writer Alfonso Reyes, who served as the first president of the Literary Council of the Mexican Writers' Center. Also noteworthy among Chávez's novels are El Río Balsas tiene sed, published in 2005, and Montañeros, published in 1964.

Born in Tepecoacuilco de Trujano, Guerrero, Mexico on 28 September 1918, Chávez died in Mexico City on 20 November 2006. Today, he is considered a distinguished son of Guerrero.
