= Casca, Rio Grande do Sul =

Municipality of Rio Grande do Sul, Brazil

Coordinates: 28°34′S 51°59′W

- Municipality
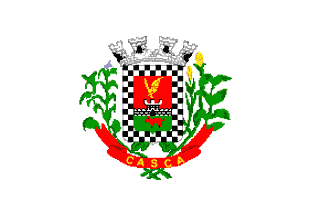
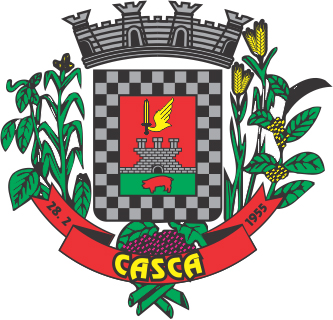
- Flag Coat of arms
- Interactive map of Casca, Rio Grande do Sul
- Country: Brazil
- Time zone: UTC−3 (BRT)

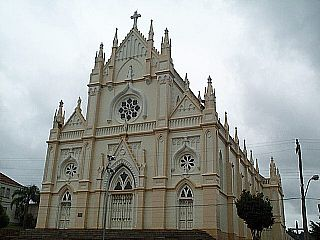
Church of St. luke Casca

Casca is a municipality in the state of Rio Grande do Sul, Brazil. As of 2020, the estimated population was 9,051.

== Geography ==
=== Climate ===
Climate data for Casca
Month	Jan	Feb	Mar	Apr	May	Jun	Jul	Aug	Sep	Oct	Nov	Dec	Year
Record high °C (°F)	34 (93)	35 (95)	34 (93)	32 (90)	30 (86)	28 (82)	28 (82)	30 (86)	33 (91)	34 (93)	36 (97)	35 (95)	36 (97)
Mean daily maximum °C (°F)	28.4 (83.1)	27.7 (81.9)	27.1 (80.8)	24.1 (75.4)	20.5 (68.9)	18.6 (65.5)	18.3 (64.9)	20.3 (68.5)	21.2 (70.2)	24.1 (75.4)	26.3 (79.3)	28 (82)	23.7 (74.7)
Daily mean °C (°F)	22.3 (72.1)	21.7 (71.1)	20.7 (69.3)	17.9 (64.2)	14.6 (58.3)	12.9 (55.2)	12.6 (54.7)	14.3 (57.7)	15.3 (59.5)	18 (64)	19.9 (67.8)	21.7 (71.1)	17.7 (63.9)
Mean daily minimum °C (°F)	17.7 (63.9)	17.4 (63.3)	16.4 (61.5)	13.8 (56.8)	10.8 (51.4)	9.2 (48.6)	8.8 (47.8)	10.1 (50.2)	10.9 (51.6)	13.4 (56.1)	14.9 (58.8)	16.8 (62.2)	13.3 (55.9)
Record low °C (°F)	8 (46)	8 (46)	4 (39)	−1 (30)	−4 (25)	−5 (23)	−7 (19)	−4 (25)	−2 (28)	0 (32)	3 (37)	5 (41)	−7 (19)
Average precipitation mm (inches)	159.4 (6.28)	158.6 (6.24)	128.8 (5.07)	125.2 (4.93)	113.5 (4.47)	137 (5.4)	154 (6.1)	170.2 (6.70)	182.9 (7.20)	180.6 (7.11)	137.6 (5.42)	153.4 (6.04)	1,801.2 (70.91)
Average relative humidity (%)	71.4	75.2	74.3	74.2	75.8	76.6	75.1	71.7	71.9	70.2	66.3	67.1	72.5
Mean monthly sunshine hours	247	202	209	187	184	157	170	173	164	210	234	229	2,365
Source: Atlas Climático Rio Grande do Sul (Normal 1976–2005)

== See also ==
- List of municipalities in Rio Grande do Sul
