= 1st federal electoral district of Guerrero =

Federal electoral district of Mexico

Guerrero's 1st
- Electoral district of the Chamber of Deputies of Mexico

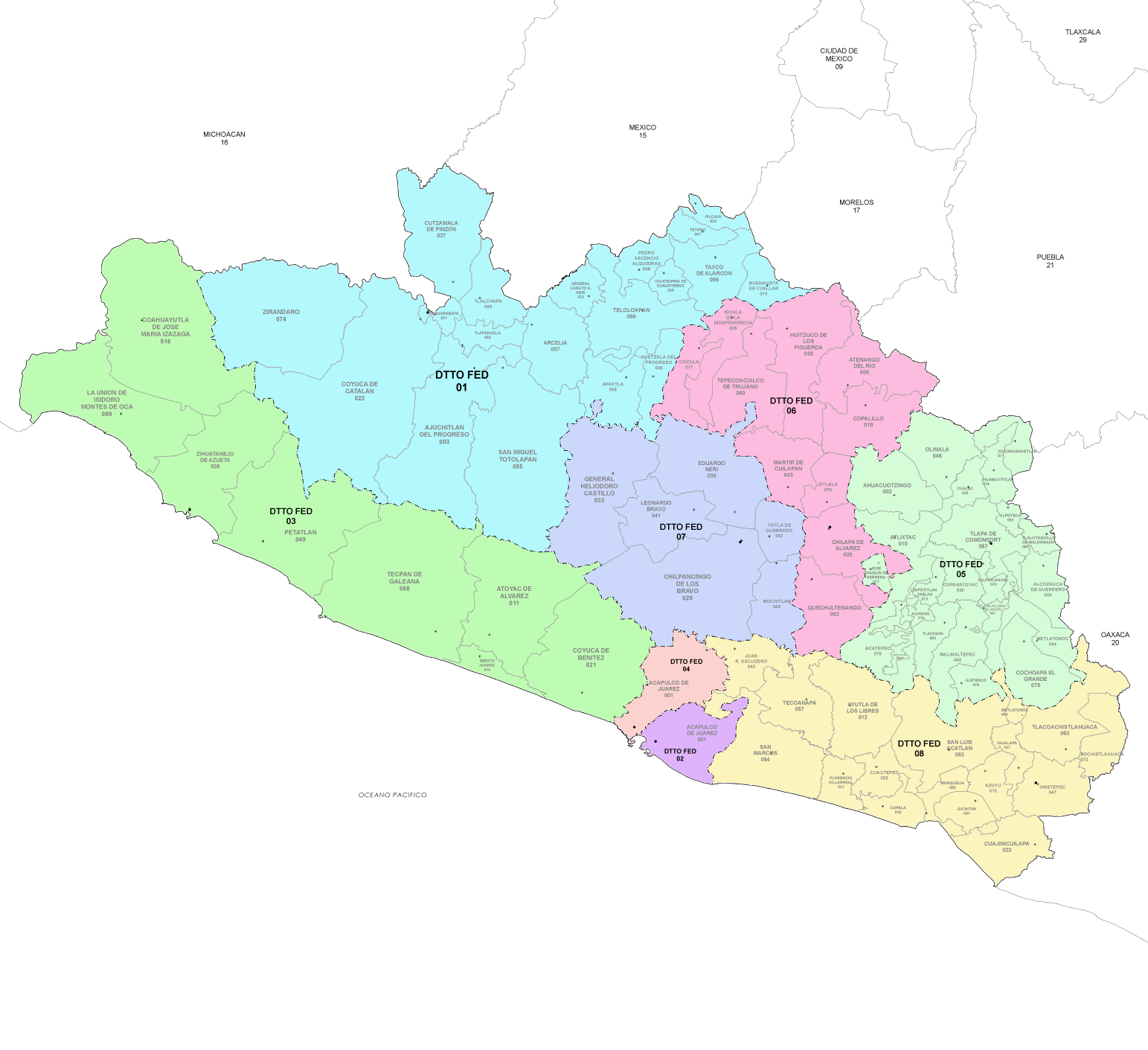
- 1st district since 2022

Incumbent
- Member: Celeste Mora Eguiluz
- Party: ▌Morena
- Congress: 66th (2024–2027)

District
- State: Guerrero
- Head town: Ciudad Altamirano
- Coordinates: 18°21′N 100°40′W
- Covers: 19 municipalities: Ajuchitlán, Apaxtla, Arcelia, Buenavista de Cuéllar, Coyuca de Catalán, Cuetzala del Progreso, Cutzamala, General Canuto A. Neri, Ixcateopan, Pedro Ascencio Alquisiras, Pilcaya, Pungarabato, San Miguel Totolapan, Taxco, Teloloapan, Tetipac, Tlalchapa, Tlapehuala, Zirándaro
- PR region: Fourth
- Precincts: 617
- Population: 482,210 (2020 census)

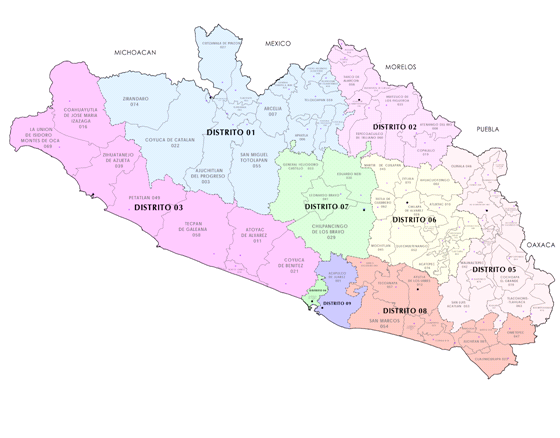
Guerrero under the 2017–2022 districting plan

The 1st federal electoral district of Guerrero (Spanish: Distrito electoral federal 01 de Guerrero) is one of the 300 electoral districts into which Mexico is divided for elections to the federal Chamber of Deputies and one of eight such districts in the state of Guerrero.

It elects one deputy to the lower house of Congress for each three-year legislative period by means of the first-past-the-post system. Votes cast in the district also count towards the calculation of proportional representation ("plurinominal") deputies elected from the fourth region.

The current member for the district, elected in the 2024 general election, is Celeste Mora Eguiluz of the National Regeneration Movement (Morena).

== District territory ==
Guerrero lost a congressional seat in the 2023 redistricting process carried out by the National Electoral Institute (INE). Under the new districting plan, which is to be used for the 2024, 2027 and 2030 federal elections, the reconfigured 1st district is located in the state's Tierra Caliente region and covers 617 electoral precincts (secciones electorales) across 19 municipalities:

- Coyuca de Catalán, Ajuchitlán, San Miguel Totolapan, Apaxtla, Cuetzala del Progreso, Teloloapan, Ixcateopan, Pedro Ascencio Alquisiras, General Canuto A. Neri, Arcelia, Tlapehuala, Tlalchapa, Cutzamala, Pungarabato and Zirándaro (all included in the 2017 scheme)
- Pilcaya, Tetipac, Taxco and Buenavista de Cuéllar (new additions)

The head town (cabecera distrital), where results from individual polling stations are gathered together and tallied, is the city of Ciudad Altamirano in the municipality of Pungarabato. The district reported a population of 482,210 in the 2020 census.

== Previous districting schemes ==
Evolution of electoral district numbers
	1974	1978	1996	2005	2017	2023
Guerrero	6	10	10	9	9	8
Chamber of Deputies	196	300				

Because of shifting population patterns, Guerrero currently has two fewer districts than the ten the state was assigned under the 1977 electoral reforms that set the national total at 300.

2017–2022

Between 2017 and 2022, Guerrero was allocated nine electoral districts. The 1st district had its head town at Ciudad Altamirano and it comprised 16 municipalities:
- Coyuca de Catalán, Ajuchitlán, San Miguel Totolapan, Apaxtla, Cuetzala del Progreso, Teloloapan, Ixcateopan, Pedro Ascencio Alquisiras, General Neri, Arcelia, Tlapehuala, Tlalchapa, Cutzamala, Pungarabato and Zirándaro (all included in the 2023 plan), plus the municipality of Cocula.

2005–2017

The 2005 districting plan assigned Guerrero nine districts. The 1st district covered 12 municipalities in the north-west of the state:
- Ajuchitlán del Progreso, Apaxtla, Arcelia, Coyuca de Catalán, Cutzamala de Pinzón, General Heliodoro Castillo, Leonardo Bravo, Pungarabato, San Miguel Totolapan, Tlalchapa, Tlapehuala and Zirándaro.
The head town was at Ciudad Altamirano.

1996–2005

Under the 1996 districting plan, which allocated Guerrero ten districts, the head town was moved to Coyuca de Catalán. The district covered nine municipalities:
- Ajuchitlán del Progreso, Arcelia, Coyuca de Catalán, Cutzamala de Pinzón, Pungarabato, San Miguel Tlalchapa, Tlapehuala, Totolapan and Zirándaro.

1978–1996

The districting scheme in force from 1978 to 1996 was the result of the 1977 electoral reforms, which increased the number of single-member seats in the Chamber of Deputies from 196 to 300. Under that plan, Guerrero's district allocation rose from six to ten. The 1st district had its head town at the state capital, Chilpancingo, and it covered the municipalities of Coyuca de Benítez, Chilpancingo de los Bravo, Juan R. Escudero, Mochitlán, Quechultenango and Tixtla de Guerrero.

== Deputies returned to Congress ==
(Mexico) National parties
- Current
- PAN
- PRI
- PT
- PVEM
- MC
- Morena
- PAZ
- Somos
- Defunct or local only
- PLM
- PNR
- PRM
- PNM
- PP
- PPS
- PARM
- PFCRN
- CON
- PANAL
- PSD
- PES
- PES
- PRD

Guerrero's 1st district
Election	Deputy	Party	Term	Legislature
1979	Herón Varela Alvarado	Institutional Revolutionary Party	1979–1982	51st Congress
1982	Zótico García Pastrana	Institutional Revolutionary Party	1982–1985	52nd Congress
1985	Humberto Salgado Gómez	Institutional Revolutionary Party	1985–1988	53rd Congress
1988	Carlos Javier Vega Memije	Institutional Revolutionary Party	1988–1991	54th Congress
1991	Florencio Salazar Adame	Institutional Revolutionary Party	1991–1994	55th Congress
1994	Efrén Nicolás Leyva Acevedo	Institutional Revolutionary Party	1994–1997	56th Congress
1997	Cuauhtémoc Salgado Romero (Note: Salgado Romero resigned his seat on 16 August 2000.); Fernando Castillo Cervantes	Institutional Revolutionary Party	1997–2000	57th Congress
2000	Héctor Pineda Velázquez	Institutional Revolutionary Party	2000–2003	58th Congress
2003	Abel Echeverría Pineda	Institutional Revolutionary Party	2003–2006	59th Congress
2006	Daniel Torres García	Party of the Democratic Revolution	2006–2009	60th Congress
2009	Cuauhtémoc Salgado Romero	Institutional Revolutionary Party	2009–2012	61st Congress
2012	Catalino Duarte Ortuño	Party of the Democratic Revolution	2012–2015	62nd Congress
2015	Silvia Rivera Carbajal	Institutional Revolutionary Party	2015–2018	63rd Congress
2018	Víctor Adolfo Mojica Wences	Labour Party (Mexico)	2018–2021	64th Congress
2021	Reynel Rodríguez Muñoz	Institutional Revolutionary Party	2021–2024	65th Congress
2024	Celeste Mora Eguiluz	National Regeneration Movement	2024–2027	66th Congress

== Presidential elections ==
Guerrero's 1st district
Election	District won by	Party or coalition	%
2018	Andrés Manuel López Obrador	Juntos Haremos Historia	62.0102
2024	Claudia Sheinbaum Pardo	Sigamos Haciendo Historia	68.5645
