= 2nd federal electoral district of Guerrero =

Federal electoral district of Mexico

Guerrero's 2nd
- Electoral district of the Chamber of Deputies of Mexico

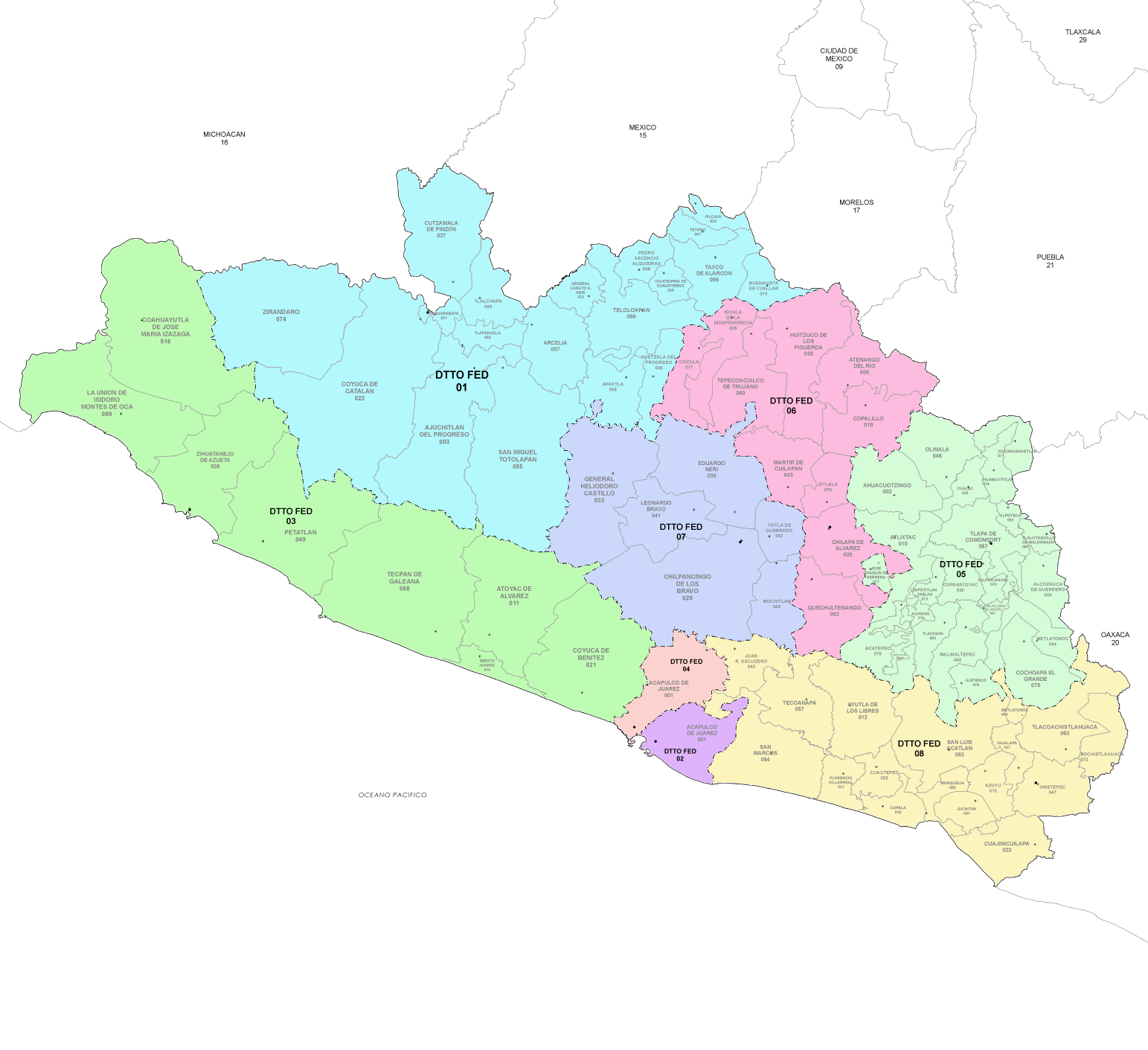
- 2nd district since 2022

Incumbent
- Member: Yoloczin Domínguez Serna
- Party: ▌Morena
- Congress: 66th (2024–2027)

District
- State: Guerrero
- Head town: Acapulco
- Coordinates: 16°52′N 99°51′W
- Covers: Municipality of Acapulco (part)
- PR region: Fourth
- Precincts: 149
- Population: 387,126 (2020 census)

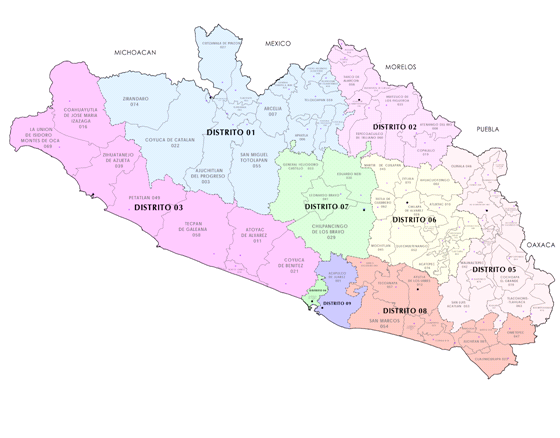
Guerrero under the 2017–2022 districting plan

The 2nd federal electoral district of Guerrero (Spanish: Distrito electoral federal 02 de Guerrero) is one of the 300 electoral districts into which Mexico is divided for elections to the federal Chamber of Deputies and one of eight such districts in the state of Guerrero.

It elects one deputy to the lower house of Congress for each three-year legislative period by means of the first-past-the-post system. Votes cast in the district also count towards the calculation of proportional representation ("plurinominal") deputies elected from the fourth region.

The current member for the district, elected in the 2024 general election, is Yoloczin Domínguez Serna of the National Regeneration Movement (Morena).

== District territory ==
Guerrero lost a congressional seat in the 2023 redistricting process carried out by the National Electoral Institute (INE). Under the new districting plan, which is to be used for the 2024, 2027 and 2030 federal elections, the 2nd district was relocated to the south-eastern portion of the municipality of Acapulco, comprising 149 precincts (secciones electorales); the remainder of the municipality makes up the 4th district.

The district's head town (cabecera distrital), where results from individual polling stations are gathered together and tallied, is the resort city of Acapulco. The district reported a population of 387,126 in the 2020 census.

== Previous districting schemes ==
Evolution of electoral district numbers
	1974	1978	1996	2005	2017	2023
Guerrero	6	10	10	9	9	8
Chamber of Deputies	196	300				

Because of shifting population patterns, Guerrero currently has two fewer districts than the ten the state was assigned under the 1977 electoral reforms that set the national total at 300.

2017–2022

Between 2017 and 2022, Guerrero was allocated nine electoral districts. The 2nd district was located in the north of the state, with its head town at Iguala. It covered nine municipalities:
- Atenango del Río, Buenavista de Cuéllar, Copalillo, Huitzuco de los Figueroa, Iguala de la Independencia, Pilcaya, Taxco de Alarcón, Tepecoacuilco de Trujano and Tetipac.

2005–2017

The 2005 districting plan assigned Guerrero nine districts. The 2nd district had its head town at Iguala and it covered ten municipalities in the north of the state:
- Cocula, Cuetzala del Progreso, General Canuto A. Neri, Iguala de la Independencia, Ixcateopan de Cuauhtémoc, Pedro Ascencio Alquisiras, Pilcaya, Taxco de Alarcón, Teloloapan and Tetipac.

1996–2005

Under the 1996 districting plan, which allocated Guerrero ten districts, the head town was at the city of Taxco and the district comprised the municipalities of Apaxtla, Buenavista de Cuéllar, Cocula, Cuetzala del Progreso, General Canuto A. Neri, Ixcateopan de Cuauhtémoc, Pedro Ascencio Alquisiras, Pilcaya, Taxco de Alarcón, Teloloapan and Tetipac. It did not include the municipality of Iguala, which was in the 4th district.

1978–1996

The districting scheme in force from 1978 to 1996 was the result of the 1977 electoral reforms, which increased the number of single-member seats in the Chamber of Deputies from 196 to 300. Under that plan, Guerrero's district allocation rose from six to ten. The 2nd district had its head town at Iguala and it covered the municipalities of Buenavista de Cuéllar, Cocula, Cuetzala del Progreso, Iguala de la Independencia, Teloloapan and Tepecoacuilco de Trujano.

== Deputies returned to Congress ==
(Mexico) National parties
- Current
- PAN
- PRI
- PT
- PVEM
- MC
- Morena
- PAZ
- Somos
- Defunct or local only
- PLM
- PNR
- PRM
- PNM
- PP
- PPS
- PARM
- PFCRN
- CON
- PANAL
- PSD
- PES
- PES
- PRD

Guerrero's 2nd district
Election	Deputy	Party	Term	Legislature
1940	Rubén Figueroa Figueroa	Institutional Revolutionary Party	1940–1943	38th Congress
1943	Carlos Carranco Cardoso	Institutional Revolutionary Party	1943-1946	39th Congress
1946	Nabor Adalberto Ojeda Caballero	Institutional Revolutionary Party	1946-1949	40th Congress
1949	Alfonso L. Nava	Institutional Revolutionary Party	1949–1952	41st Congress
1952	Jesús Mastachi Román	Institutional Revolutionary Party	1952–1955	42nd Congress
1955	Jorge Soberón Acevedo	Institutional Revolutionary Party	1955–1958	43rd Congress
1958	Macrina Rabadán Santana	Popular Socialist Party (Mexico)	1958–1961	44th Congress
1961	María López Díaz	Institutional Revolutionary Party	1961–1964	45th Congress
1964	Rubén Figueroa Figueroa	Institutional Revolutionary Party	1964–1967	46th Congress
1967	Humberto Acevedo Astudillo	Institutional Revolutionary Party	1967–1970	47th Congress
1970	Jaime Pineda Salgado	Institutional Revolutionary Party	1970–1973	48th Congress
1973	Píndaro Uriostegui Miranda	Institutional Revolutionary Party	1973–1976	49th Congress
1976	Isaías Duarte Martínez	Institutional Revolutionary Party	1970–1973	48th Congress
1979	Porfirio Camarena Castro	Institutional Revolutionary Party	1979–1982	51st Congress
1982	José Martínez Morales	Institutional Revolutionary Party	1982–1985	52nd Congress
1985	Porfirio Camarena Castro	Institutional Revolutionary Party	1985–1988	53rd Congress
1988	Félix Salgado Macedonio	Popular Socialist Party (Mexico)	1988–1991	54th Congress
1991	Porfirio Camarena Castro	Institutional Revolutionary Party	1991–1994	55th Congress
1994	Píndaro Urióstegui Miranda	Institutional Revolutionary Party	1994–1997	56th Congress
1997	Miguel Villarreal Díaz	Institutional Revolutionary Party	1997–2000	57th Congress
2000	Flor Añorve Ocampo	Institutional Revolutionary Party	2000–2003	58th Congress
2003	Álvaro Burgos Barrera	Institutional Revolutionary Party	2003–2006	59th Congress
2006	Modesto Brito González	Party of the Democratic Revolution	2006–2009	60th Congress
2009	Esteban Albarrán Mendoza; Omar Flores Majul	Institutional Revolutionary Party	2009–2012; 2012	61st Congress
2012	Marino Miranda Salgado (Note: Miranda Salgado was elected for the PT but switched his allegiance to the PRD on 4 September 2012.)	Labour Party (Mexico) Party of the Democratic Revolution	2012–2015	62nd Congress
2015	Salomón Majul González	Institutional Revolutionary Party	2015–2018	63rd Congress
2018	Araceli Ocampo Manzanares	National Regeneration Movement	2018–2021	64th Congress
2021	Araceli Ocampo Manzanares	National Regeneration Movement	2021–2024	65th Congress
2024	Yoloczin Domínguez Serna	National Regeneration Movement	2024–2027	66th Congress

== Presidential elections ==
Guerrero's 2nd district
Election	District won by	Party or coalition	%
2018	Andrés Manuel López Obrador	Juntos Haremos Historia	58.8368
2024	Claudia Sheinbaum Pardo	Sigamos Haciendo Historia	80.9293
