= Ángel Tavira =

1924-2008 Mexican composer, musician and violinist

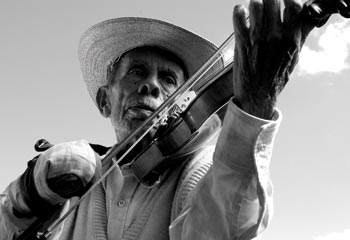

Ángel Tavira Maldonado (July 3, 1924 – June 30, 2008) was a Mexican composer, musician and violinist of son calentano. He was awarded the Best Actor Award on the 2006 Cannes Film Festival in the Un Certain Regard section for his role in the movie The Violin.

== Biography ==
Ángel Tavira Maldonado was born in the town of Corral Falso in the municipality of Ajuchitlán del Progreso, Guerrero, which lies in the region known as Tierra Caliente. He was the only child of J. Isabel Maldonado Tavira and Anita Tavira López, and grandson of Juan Bartolo Tavira, a composer and performer of son, gustos, Indias, malagueñas, rhymes and coplas, who inspired and taught him the love for local traditional music. Being born in a family traditionally related with music, he was successively encouraged by his uncles and cousins Félix, José Guadalupe Lupito, and Sósimo Tavira López in learning and playing music. When he was six years old, he began to play four instruments by ear training: saxophone, bass, guitar and violin, and later he went to take courses in classical, semi-classical and romantic music. Still being young he suffered an accident during the town's patron saint feast when a firework exploded in his right hand, which had to be amputated, discouraging Tavira from playing music. However, it was his uncle "Lupito" who encouraged him to continue performing. Later on, he went to take classes at the National Conservatory of Music in Mexico City.

He was considered a great composer of son calentano, traditional music genre of Tierra Caliente (a region within the state of Guerrero), along with other composers such as Juan Reynoso Portillo, Cástulo Benítez, José Natividad Leandro, Zacarías Salmerón and Pedro Ignacio Pablo. When he was 60 years old he enrolled at the Music Conservatory of Morelia to study music notation with the purpose of recovering the traditional music of his region. Ángel Tavira was director of the Hermanos Tavira Band, a musical group that has been protecting and promoting the traditional music by recovering the works of Juan Reynoso, Zacarías and Filiberto Salmerón, and Severino Bañuelos. Among other activities, Ángel Tavira was a farmer, a goldsmith and, as a teacher, he worked at the "Antonia Nava de Catalán" Kindergarten and at the "Jaime Torres Bodet" Secondary School No. 2, since 1972 until he retired, 32 years later, in Iguala.

In 1988, Tavira was introduced to politics when he was selected as Federal Substitute Deputy for the candidacy of Félix Salgado Macedonio. Ángel Tavira married Rafaela Martínez with whom he had ten children: Ma de los Ángeles, Elizabeth, Rafaela, Ma. Eugenia, Carlos, Felix, Ángel, Guadalupe, Salvador and Alejandro

With no studies or experience in acting he participated in 2005 in the movie El violín, directed by Francisco Vargas Quevedo, in the role of don Plutarco Hidalgo, a musician and farmer that participates in a guerrilla that plans to revolt against its own government, role for which he obtained the Best Actor Award in the Un Certain Regard section (Prix d'interprétation masculine - Un certain regard) at the 2006 Cannes Film Festival, besides being awarded the Golden Kikito for best actor in a Latin Motion Picture category of the 34th Festival de Gramado, and a Special Jury Award at the 30th São Paulo International Film Festival. Tavira died of kidney complications on June 30, 2008.
