= Zacarías Salmerón =

Mexican composer, musician and violinist

Zacarías Salmerón Daza (September 6, 1918, in Tlapehuala, Guerrero, Mexico - January 28, 2011) was a Mexican composer, musician and violinist of son calentano.

== Biography ==
Zacarías Salmerón Daza was born in Tlapehuala, Guerrero, Mexico. He is nephew of J. Isaías Salmerón Pastenes, who is considered one of the pillars of the calentano music and who became a teacher to Zacarías and Juan Reynoso Portillo. He is considered an important composer of son calentano, traditional music genre of Tierra Caliente, a region within the state of Guerrero, along with other composers such as Juan Reynoso Portillo, Ángel Tavira, Cástulo Benítez, José Natividad Leandro and Pedro Ignacio Pablo. He studied at the National School of Fine Arts and is author to 50 waltzes. He has recorded three albums: El poeta del violín (Poet of Violin), Entre amigos (Among Friends), and Bienvenidos a Tlapehuala (Welcome to Tlapehuala) Furthermore, he has been a music teacher at Tlapehuala's kindergarten, a job obtained thanks to President Lázaro Cárdenas, who cherished his friendship. He has travelled to several cities within Mexico and the United States to present his music, even reaching to play for President Jimmy Carter at the White House. He was married twice; from his first marriage he had eight children, and one more from his second marriage to Consuelo Segura Beltrán.
