= Catalino =

Catalino is a surname or given name. Notable people with the name include:

surname

- Gina Catalino (born 1984), American folk-pop singer/songwriter
- Grant Catalino, American lacrosse player

given name

- Catalino Cuy (born 1957), Filipino police director
- Catalino Macaraig Jr. (1927–2003), Filipino politician
- Catalino Luis Roy Ortiz, Paraguayan Minister of National Defense
- Catalino Duarte Ortuño (born 1970), Mexican politician
- Catalino Rivarola (born 1965), Paraguayan football player
