= Coyuca =

Coyuca may refer to:

- Coyuca de Benítez, a city in the Mexican state of Guerrero
  - Coyuca de Benítez (municipality), its surrounding municipality
- Coyuca de Catalán, a city in the Mexican state of Guerrero
  - Coyuca de Catalán (municipality), its surrounding municipality
