= Misael Tamayo Hernández =

Mexican crime journalist and murder victim

- Born: 2 March 1952; Tlalchapa, Guerrero, Mexico
- Died: 10 November 2006 (aged 53); Zihuatanejo, Guerrero, Mexico
- Known for: Investigative journalism

Misael Tamayo Hernández (2 March 1952 – 10 November 2006) was a Mexican journalist, editorial director, and founder of El Despertar de la Costa, a family-run newspaper from the state of Guerrero.

As a journalist, he was a harsh critic of local corruption, drug trafficking, and the Mexican drug cartels. On 10 November 2006, Tamayo Hernández was abducted and found dead inside a motel room in Guerrero, presumably killed by a lethal injection; the crime is yet to be solved, but there are signs that his death was work-related.

== Early life and career ==
Tamayo Hernández was born in the Tierra Caliente region in Tlalchapa, Guerrero on 2 March 1952. Before going into journalism, he worked at a credit bank for the government at his locality and as a rancher. He had some experience in politics by joining the Institutional Revolutionary Party (PRI), but he gave it up and followed his dream to pursue a career in journalism and create his own newspaper in 2001.

Tamayo Hernández was the editorial director and owner of El Despertar de la Costa ("The Awakening of the Coast"), a newspaper that circulates around the Costa Grande region in the state of Guerrero and is based in the city of Zihuatanejo, right on the coast of the Pacific Ocean. His newspaper was also run by his two sisters, Ruth and Rebecca Tamayo Hernández, who, along with Misael, took a critical stance of the local corruption and organized crime. He also wrote extensively on the drug cartel turf wars in Zihuatanejo and Acapulco, areas known for their lucrative smuggling routes for narcotics.

== Death ==
At around 9 a.m. on 9 November 2006, Tamayo Hernández left the offices of El Despertar de la Costa to have breakfast in Ixtapa with a bus company manager and former police commander of the state, Reynaldo Ríos de los Santos. (Note: Other sources indicate that the name was Reynaldo Chávez, or Reinaldo Ríos de los Santos.) About an hour and a half later, the journalist called his newspaper and told a reporter to carry out a report on the water administration of a nearby town. Tamayo Hernández had written on his newspaper column earlier that morning on the alleged corruption that besets the water system in Zihuatanejo city. After making this call, Tamayo Hernández never returned to work and stopped answering phone calls. By 3 a.m. the next day, his family contacted the police after not hearing from him. The man who accompanied him remains disappeared.

Tamayo Hernández (aged 53) was eventually found dead at 7:30 a.m. on 10 November 2006 by a security guard inside a motel room in the outskirts of Zihuatanejo, Guerrero. Both of his hands were tied behind his back with a belt, and three small perforations on both of his arms indicated that he was killed with a lethal injection. Post-mortem reports showed that he had died of a massive heart attack probably caused by the drugs injected into his body. (Note: His family does not believe that the lethal injection shows that Tamayo Hernández was addicted to drugs. They claim that he was killed this way to sway the real motives behind his death.) He was completely naked; in the back pocket of his trousers, a small bag with white powder – possibly cocaine – was discovered at the crime scene. (Note: There are other versions that Tamayo Hernández was wearing an underwear and that his body was wet.) Later investigations showed that the credit and debit cards of Tamayo Hernández were used after he was killed, but no arrests have been made.

He reportedly received several death threats while being alive, but never took them seriously. The motives behind his death are still unknown, but there are signs that Tamayo Hernández's killing was work-related and due to his coverage on organized crime, drug trafficking, and corruption.

=== Funeral ===
In Ciudad Altamirano and Tlalchapa, Tamayo Hernández's body was held in a wake and was buried in Arcelia, Guerrero on 13 November 2006.

=== Background ===
Tamayo Hernández was the seventh journalist killed or disappeared in the country in 2006, placing Mexico at the top of the list for journalists assassinated in the Western Hemisphere. In the state of Guerrero, where Tamayo Hernández was killed, several other journalists received death threats that same year.

Back in 1998, Pedro Valle Hernández and another journalist were assassinated in Guerrero, apparently as a reprisal for their journalistic coverage.

=== Legacy ===
The most prominent journalists in the state of Guerrero are given an annual award called the "State journalism award Misael Tamayo," in honor of him.

== Personal life ==
Tamayo Hernández had five children, one of them named Misael Tamayo Núñez, the current editorial director of El Despertar del Sur ("The Awakening of the South"), another family-owned newspaper in Arcelia, Guerrero, with Concepción Núñez, his wife.

He also had two sisters, Ruth and Rebeca Tamayo Hernández, who live in the city of Zihuatanejo.

== See also ==
- Mexican drug war
- List of journalists killed in Mexico
