= Omar Flores Majul =

Mexican politician

- Born: 11 September 1975 (age 50); Taxco, Guerrero, Mexico
- Occupation: Politician
- Political party: PRI
- Spouse: Lili Campos

Omar Jalil Flores Majul (born 11 September 1975) is a Mexican politician from the Institutional Revolutionary Party (PRI). In 2012 he served in the Chamber of Deputies during the 61st session of Congress, representing Guerrero's second district as the alternate of Esteban Albarrán Mendoza.
