= Aero Sudpacífico =

Mexican regional airline

Sudpacífico
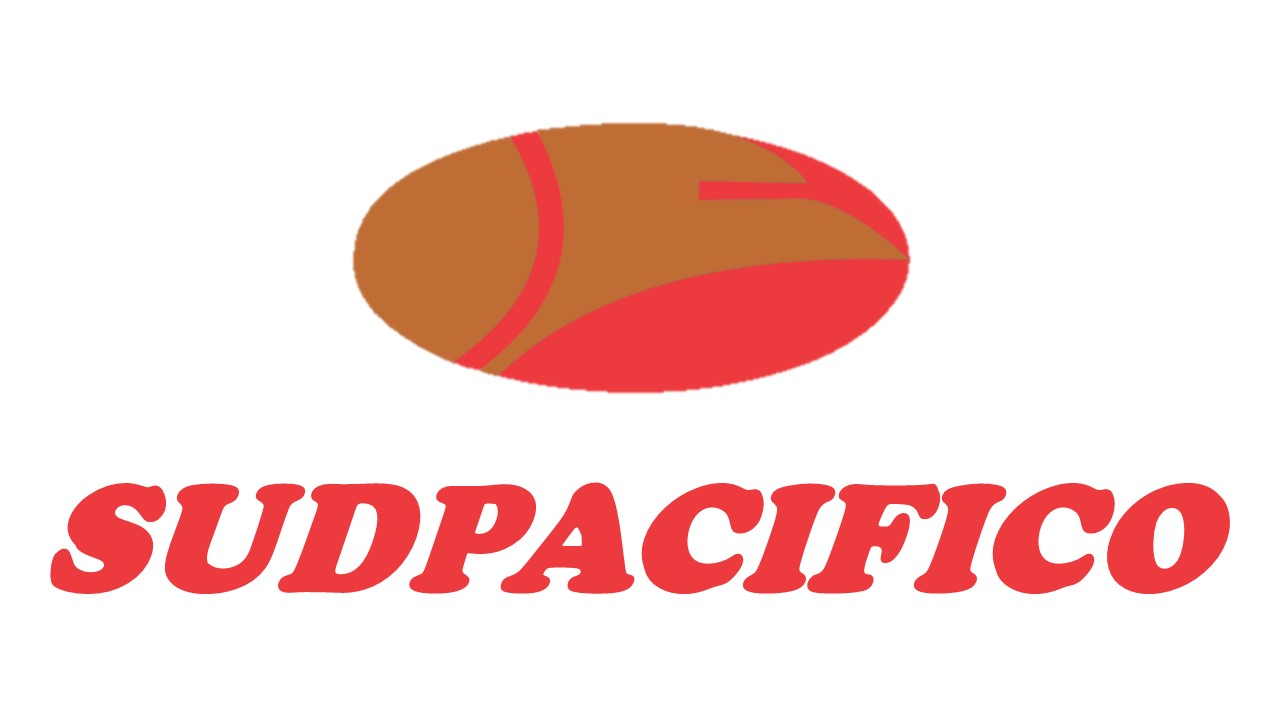
| IATA | ICAO | Call sign |
|---|---|---|
| — | SDP | Sudpacífico |
- Founded: 1990; 36 years ago
- Ceased operations: 1996; 30 years ago
- Hubs: Uruapan International Airport
- Focus cities: Morelia International Airport; Lázaro Cárdenas Airport
- Fleet size: 9 (during its existence)
- Destinations: 15
- Parent company: Aero Sudpacífico S.A. de C.V.
- Headquarters: Uruapan, Michoacán, Mexico
- Key people: C.P.A. Manuel Argüeyes

Aero Sudpacífico was a Mexican regional airline which had its base at the Uruapan International Airport, in Uruapan, Michoacán, where it kept operations between 1990 and 1996.

== History ==
The airline emerged as Aero Sudpacífico on 1990 because of the need to connect Morelia and Uruapan, this route was serviced by a Britten-Norman BN-2 Islander. In that year the airline acquired another Islander and a Fairchild SA-226TC Metro-II. Due to the success of the Metro II, Aero Sudpacífico acquired two other similar aircraft, and began to fly to Apatzingán, Lázaro Cárdenas, Guadalajara, Zihuatanejo, Zamora and Mexico City.

During 1993 Aero Sudpacífico had many competitors like Aero Cuahonte and AeroLitoral, so that Aero Sudpacífico had the need to acquire an Embraer 120 Brasilia, being the first operator in Mexico of this kind of aircraft. The Embraer Brasilia allowed Aero Sudpacífico to open flights to Querétaro, Monterrey and Celaya, also caused Aero Sudpacífico changed its name to Sudpacífico and also to change the logo of the brand to a golden eagle, as the logo used before It was a Metro-II flying over the horizon. The Embraer 120 finished operations with Sudpacífico on 1995 because of the devaluation of Mexican peso and the high operation costs.

For 1996 (its last year of operations) Aerosudpacífico operated short routes with daily flights from Morelia to Mexico City, Uruapan, Huetamo, Zihuatanejo, Guadalajara, Lázaro Cárdenas, Apatzingán and Ciudad Altamirano. However, the increase in operating costs due to the devaluation of the peso, as well as the loss of various aircraft in accidents and various debts and seizures at different airports forced the airline to cease operations this year.

== Destinations ==
Sudpacífico opered these destinations during its working.

| Focus destination |

| City | State | IATA | ICAO | Airport | Ref |
|---|---|---|---|---|---|
| Apatzingán | (Mexico) (Michoacán) | AZG | MMAG | Pablo L. Sidar National Airport | |
| Ciudad Altamirano | (Mexico) (Guerrero) | - | MM35 | Santa Barbara Regional Airport | |
| Mexico City | (Mexico City) | MEX | MMMX | Mexico City International Airport | |
| Celaya | (Mexico) (Guanajuato) | CYW | MMCY | Captain Rogelio Castillo National Airport | |
| Colima | (Mexico) (Colima) | CLQ | MMIA | Colima Airport | |
| Guadalajara | (Mexico) (Jalisco) | GDL | MMGL | Miguel Hidalgo y Costilla Guadalajara International Airport | |
| Huetamo | (Mexico) (Michoacán) | - | MM73 | Huetamo Airfield | |
| Lázaro Cárdenas | (Mexico) (Michoacán) | LZC | MMLC | Lázaro Cárdenas Airport | |
| Manzanillo | (Mexico) (Colima) | ZLO | MMZO | Playa de Oro International Airport | |
| Morelia | (Mexico) (Michoacán) | MLM | MMMM | Morelia International Airport | |
| Monterrey | (Mexico) (Nuevo León) | MTY | MMMY | Monterrey International Airport | |
| Querétaro | (Mexico) (Querétaro) | QRO | MMQT | Engineer Fernando Espinosa Gutiérrez National Airport | |
| Uruapan | (Mexico) (Michoacán) | UPN | MMPN | Uruapan International Airport | |
| Zamora | (Mexico) (Michoacán) | ZMM | MMZM | Zamora National Airport | |
| Zihuatanejo | (Mexico) (Guerrero) | ZIH | MMZH | Ixtapa-Zihuatanejo International Airport | |

== Historical fleet ==
During its existence Sudpacífico operated the following aircraft:

Sudpacífico & Aerosudpacífico fleet
| Aircraft | In service | Registration | Note |
|---|---|---|---|
| Fairchild Swearingen SA-226TC Metro II | 3 | N32AG, N248AM y N247AM (XA-SJY) | XA-SJY crashed in Morelia in 1996. |
| Britten-Norman BN-2B-27 Islander | 1 | XA-RML | Crashed in 1992 |
| Britten-Norman BN-2A-8 Islander | 1 | XA-RRM | Crashed in 1996 |
| Piper PA-34-200 Seneca | 1 | XA-RTO | Used as air taxi |
| Grumman I | 1 | XA-TBT | Seized by ASA in Uruapan Airport |
| Embraer EMB-120RT Brasilia | 1 | XA-SQN | Returned to the lessor |
| Fokker F-27J | 1 | XA-RMB | Accidented during a test flight at Mexico City Airport |
| Total | 9 | | |
