= Abel Echeverría Pineda =

Mexican politician

- Born: 26 August 1954 (age 71); Coyuca de Catalán, Guerrero, Mexico
- Occupation: Politician
- Political party: PRI

Abel Echeverría Pineda (born 26 August 1954) is a Mexican politician affiliated with the Institutional Revolutionary Party (PRI). In the 2003 mid-terms he was elected to the Chamber of Deputies to represent the first district of Guerrero during the 59th Congress. He had previously served in the 56th session of the Congress of Guerrero.
