= Marino Miranda Salgado =

Mexican politician (born 1962)

- Born: 28 February 1962 (age 64); Oxtotitlán, Guerrero, Mexico
- Occupation: Deputy
- Political party: PRD

Marino Miranda Salgado (born 28 February 1962) is a Mexican politician affiliated with the Party of the Democratic Revolution (PRD). In the 2012 general election he was elected to the Chamber of Deputies to represent the second district of Guerrero during the 62nd Congress. He was originally elected for the Labour Party (PT) but switched his allegiance to the PRD on 4 September 2012.

He previously served as a local deputy in the Congress of Guerrero, as well as the municipal president of Teloloapan.
