= Canuto =

Parroquia Canuto in Ecuador Province of Manabi born place in 1951 of Iván Bravo

Canuto is the Spanish and Portuguese form of the name Knut. As such, in those languages it refers to historical figures like Cnut the Great. Knut (Norwegian and Swedish), Knud (Danish), or Knútur (Icelandic) is a Scandinavian first name, of which the anglicized form is Cnut or Canute. In Germany both "Knut" and "Knud" are used. The name is derived from the Old Norse Knútr meaning "knot".

In English, it can refer to:

== People ==
- Canuto Oreta (1938–2012), a Filipino politician
- Canuto Kallan (born in 1960), a Danish/Greek painter/visual artist
- Roberto F. Canuto (born in 1973), a Spanish film director.
- Sílvio José Canuto (born in 1977), a Brazilian football midfielder
- Ignacio Canuto (born in 1986), an Argentine football central defender

== Places ==
- General Canuto A. Neri (municipality)
- Estadio Juan Canuto Pettengill
