= Zamora National Airport =

Zamora National Airport Aeropuerto Nacional de Zamora
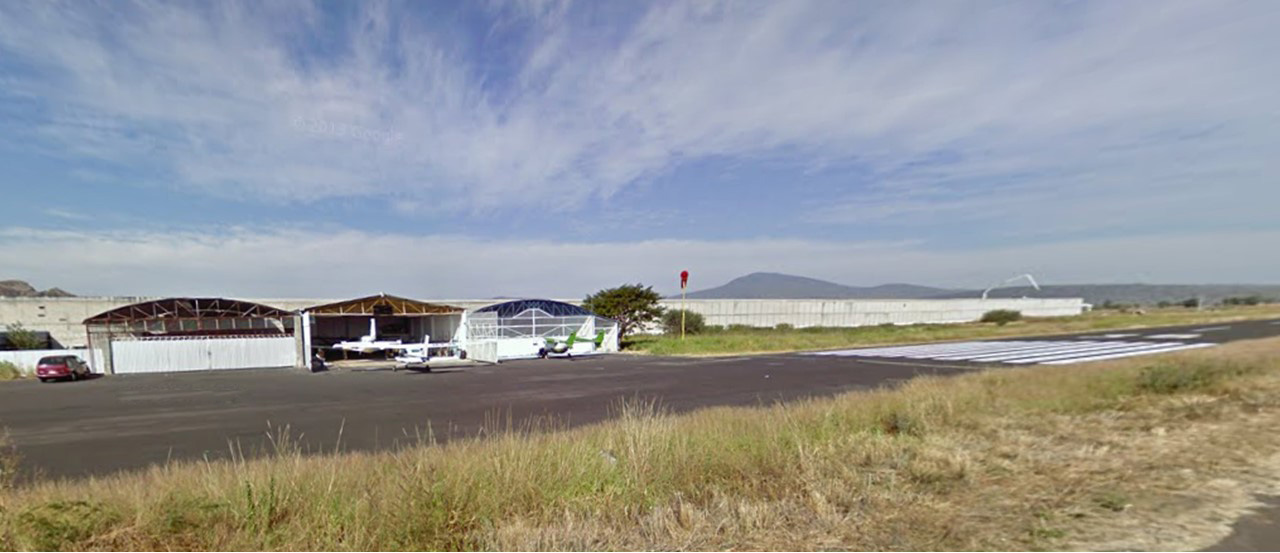
- IATA: ZMM; ICAO: MMZM; LID: ZAM

Summary
- Airport type: Public
- Operator: Michoacan State Government
- Serves: Zamora de Hidalgo
- Location: Zamora Municipality
- Elevation AMSL: 5,141 ft / 1,567 m
- Coordinates: 20°02′44″N 102°16′31″W

Map
- Location of the airport in Michoacan ZMM (Mexico)

Runways
Direction	Length		Surface
Direction	ft	m	Surface
18/36	4,920	1,500	Asphalt

Statistics (2024)
- Bassed aircraft: 23
- AFAC

Zamora National Airport (IATA: ZMM, ICAO: MMZM, FAA LID: ZAM) is an airport located in La Rinconada, 3 kilometers north of Zamora, Michoacán, Mexico.

== Background ==
It features a runway 1,500 meters long and 18 meters wide, a main aviation apron of 3,900 square meters and a secondary one of 1,500 square meters, as well as hangars and a control tower with a communications frequency of 122.8.

In 2024, there were 23 fixed-wing aircraft based at Zamora Airport; according to the AFAC, the airport handled regular passenger operations between 1992 and 1994, provided by the airline Sudpacífico.

== Accidents and incidents ==
- On December 9, 1992, a Britten-Norman BN-2B-27 Islander aircraft registered XA-RML, operated by Aero Sudpacífico, on a commercial flight between Apatzingán Airport and Zamora Airport, crashed over the Tancítaro municipality a few minutes after takeoff, killing all 8 passengers and the pilot. It is alleged that the aircraft had an engine shutdown due to icing in the carburetors; this aircraft was on a flight between Uruapan Airport and Guadalajara Airport with intermediate stops in Apatzingán and Zamora.
