= Captain Rogelio Castillo National Airport =

Airport in Celaya, Guanajuato, Mexico

Celaya National Airport Aeropuerto Nacional de Celaya
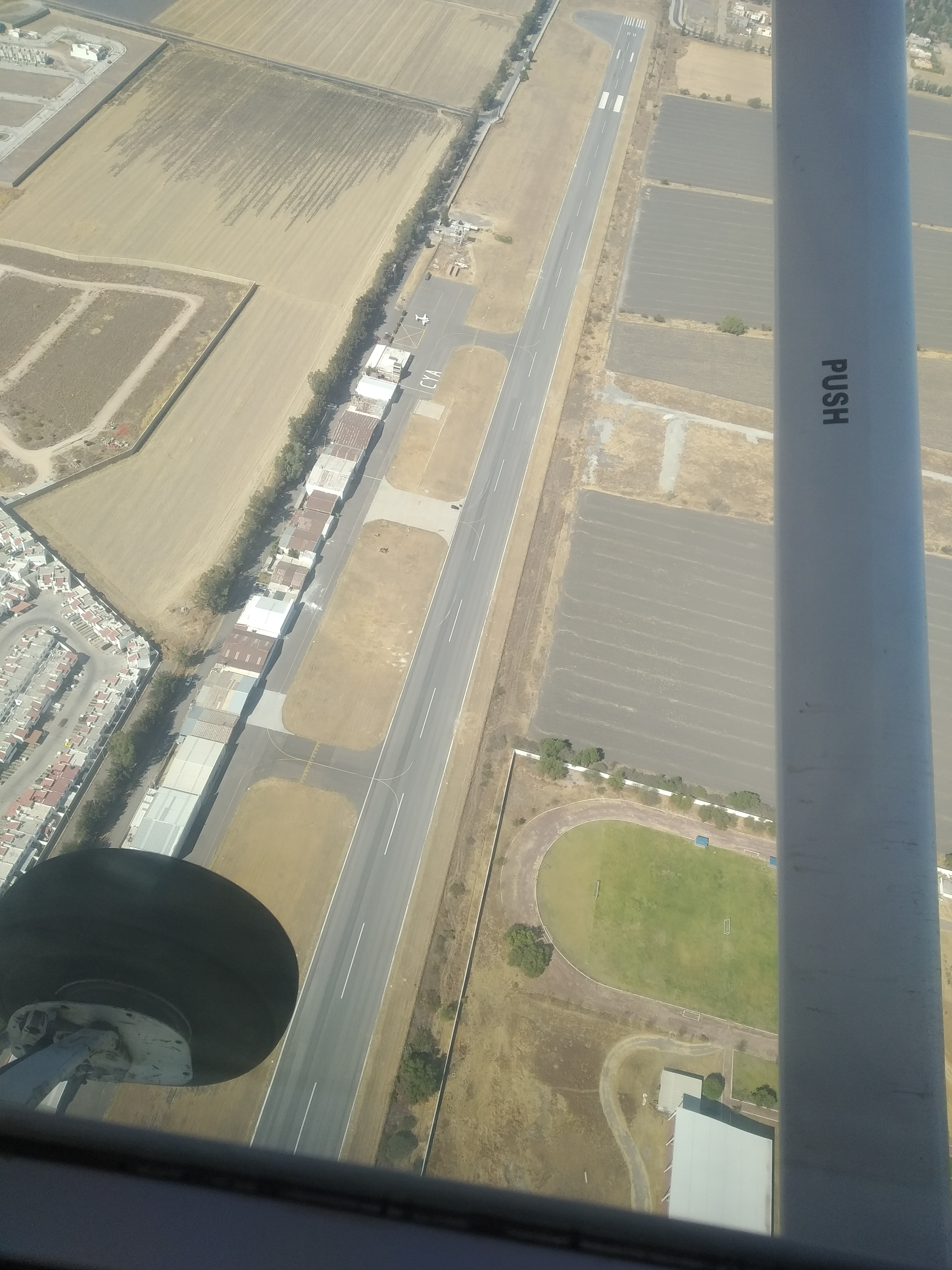
- IATA: CYW; ICAO: MMCY; LID: CYA

Summary
- Airport type: Public
- Operator: Patronato del Aeropuerto de Celaya
- Serves: Celaya, Guanajuato, Mexico
- Time zone: CST (UTC−06:00)
- Elevation AMSL: 1,740 m (5,710 ft)
- Coordinates: 20°32′45″N 100°53′11″W

Map
- Location of airport in Guanajuato CYW (Mexico)

Runways
Direction	Length		Surface
Direction	m	ft	Surface
08/26	1,915	6,283	Asphalt

Statistics (2021)
- Total passengers: N/A
- Source: Agencia Federal de Aviación Civil

Celaya National Airport (Spanish: Aeropuerto Nacional de Celaya); officially Aeropuerto Nacional Capitán Rogelio Castillo (Capitán Rogelio Castillo National Airport) (IATA: CYW, ICAO: MMCY) is a small airport located in Celaya, Guanajuato, Mexico. It handles domestic air traffic and supports flight training and general aviation activities. The airport does not provide scheduled passenger public services. The nearest airport that serves commercial flights is León/Bajío International Airport. It is operated by Patronato del Aeropuerto de Celaya.

Situated at an elevation of 1,740 metres (5,710 ft) above mean sea level, it features a single asphalt runway, designated as 08/26, measuring 1,915 by 30 metres (6,283 by 98 ft). Adjacent facilities include civil aviation hangars, an apron with parking positions for aircraft, and a small terminal building.

Over time, the airfield has had sporadic service from charter and regional airlines, providing seasonal flights within Mexico. Between 1993 and 1995, Aero Sudpacífico, a regional airline, conducted commercial flights to Monterrey, Morelia, Uruapan, Querétaro, and Ixtapa-Zihuatanejo. In the period from 2007 to 2008, Aeromar operated routes from Celaya to Querétaro, Monterrey, and Mexico City. Global Air, a charter company, currently utilizes a maintenance hangar for its Boeing 737-200 aircraft at this airport.

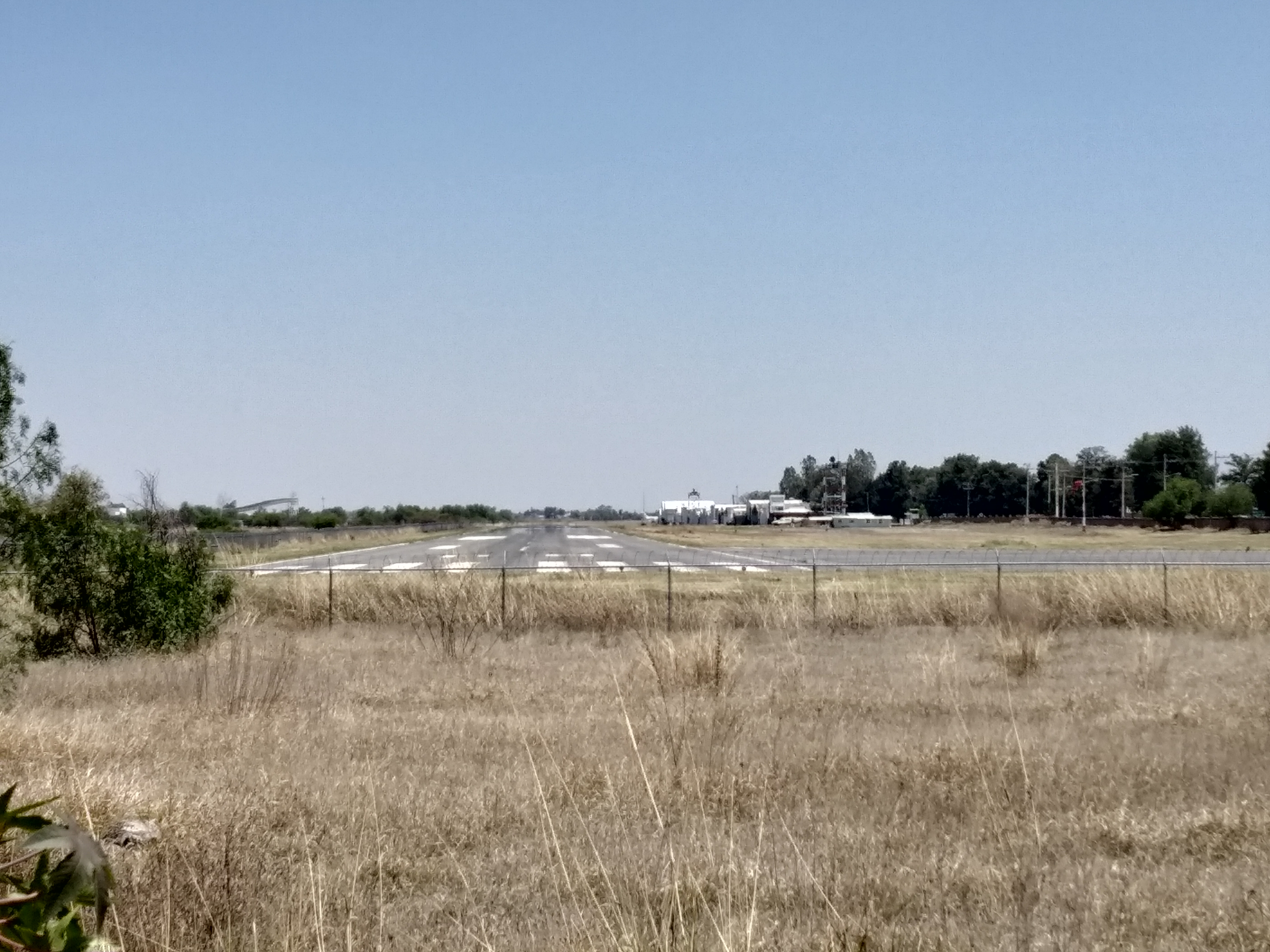
Runway at Celaya Airport

== See also ==
- List of the busiest airports in Mexico
- List of airports in Mexico
- List of airports by ICAO code: M
- List of busiest airports in North America
- List of the busiest airports in Latin America
- Transportation in Mexico
- Tourism in Mexico
- León/Bajío International Airport
