= Enrique Perea Quintanilla =

Mexican crime journalist and murder victim

- Born: 1956
- Died: August 9, 2006 (aged 50)
- Body discovered: Aldama, Chihuahua, Mexico
- Years active: 1986–2006
- Known for: Investigative journalism

Enrique Perea Quintanilla (1956 – August 9, 2006) was a Mexican journalist, veteran crime reporter, and founder of the magazine Dos Caras, Una Verdad ("Two Sides, One Truth"), a monthly investigative magazine specializing in reporting homicides and drug trafficking activities in the Mexican state of Chihuahua.

He had 20 years of experience as an investigative journalist and crime reporter, and worked for two local newspapers before deciding to create his own in 2005. His work encompassed a series of investigative reports on drug-related murders, political corruption, and the local drug trade. In an apparent reprisal for his work, Perea Quintanilla was abducted and killed by alleged drug traffickers in August 2006 in Chihuahua. The crime remains unsolved.

== Early life and career ==
Perea Quintanilla had 20 years of experience as a crime reporter, since he had worked for the dailies El Heraldo de Chihuahua and El Diario de Chihuahua before deciding to create his own magazine, Dos Caras, Una Verdad (Two Sides, One Truth), in 2005. His new magazine was strictly crime-related, and it was known for criticizing the Mexican government for the high homicides rates in the state of Chihuahua, particularly the executions between rival drug gangs. He also wrote in his magazine about corrupt officials, unsolved murders, and drug trafficking activities. Perea Quintanilla reportedly endured harassment from local officials who wanted to censor his work.

Prior to his assassination, Perea Quintanilla wrote in his last column that Dos Caras, Una Verdad had several video clips, photos, and documents sufficiently in detail to supposedly inculpate various politicians and officials in the government, including the then-governor of Chihuahua, José Reyes Baeza Terrazas.

== Assassination ==
On a dirt road outside of the state capital city of Chihuahua, Chihuahua in the municipality of Aldama, the Mexican authorities discovered the body of the veteran journalist Perea Quintanilla at around 2 p.m. on 9 August 2006. His corpse bore signs of torture and had gunshot wounds from a .45 caliber pistol in the head and back. According to the police, the way Perea Quintanilla was killed bore all the signs of a killing orchestrated by a Mexican organized crime group and was apparently work-related. Perea Quintanilla was seen for the last time leaving his office at 11 a.m. the day before, but his vehicle was found abandoned in downtown Chihuahua later that night. His family reported his disappearance to the police on 8 August, just a day before he was found dead.

=== Background ===
With the death of Perea Quintanilla, the list of journalists killed in Mexico reached 10 since 2004. Two other journalists were reported missing and their whereabouts are unknown, but these numbers have grown significantly since then.

Six other journalists were killed across the country from October through December 2006: Gerardo Guevara Domínguez of the Siglo 21 weekly was killed in the state of Durango; Misael Tamayo Hernández of the El Despertar de la Costa daily was killed by a lethal injection; José Manuel Sánchez Nava, who had written a book criticizing the administration of the former President Vicente Fox, was stabbed to death in Mexico City, the nation's capital; Roberto Marcos García of the Testimonio weekly was shot and killed by alleged drug traffickers; Adolfo Sánchez Guzmán, the anchorman of a local Televisa channel in Veracruz, was killed in an apparent revenge attack; José Antonio García Apac, who wrote for the Ecos de la Cuenca, was abducted and has not been found.

=== Video confessions ===
The Mexican multimedia conglomerate TV Azteca received a video from an anonymous user on 12 October 2012 showing two naked men, with clear signs of having undergone torture, confessing their involvement in the assassination of Perea Quintanilla. The alleged killers, Leopoldo Rodríguez García and Armando Duarte Escobedo, were interrogated by an unseen man heard in the background of the video clip, and admitted that they had killed Perea Quintanilla on orders of three drug lords of the Juárez Cartel, a Mexican drug trafficking organization based in the northern state of Chihuahua.

In a second video sent to the website of El Diario de Chihuahua newspaper, the lawyer and brother of the Chihuahua state attorney general, Mario Ángel González, is seen handcuffed and surrounded by at least five masked gunmen carrying assault rifles. After answering some questions, the man confessed that his sister Patricia González, the state attorney general, had ordered the execution of Perea Quintanilla and Armando Rodríguez Carreón, another journalist.

The authenticity of the confessions provided by the man in the video are questionable and have not been confirmed.

== Personal life ==
Perea Quintanilla had two sons, Sergio Enrique and Jonathan Perea Cárdenas. The latter was killed by an unidentified gunman on 31 October 2009.

== See also ==
- Mexican drug war

== Sources ==
=== Bibliography ===
- Phillips, Andrew (1 September 2007). Censored 2008: The Top 25 Censored Stories of 2007-07. Seven Stories Press. p. 303. ISBN 978-1583227725.
