= Modesto Brito González =

Mexican politician

- Born: 4 December 1954 (age 71); Guerrero, Mexico
- Occupation: Politician
- Political party: PRD

Modesto Brito González (born 4 December 1954) is a Mexican politician affiliated with the Party of the Democratic Revolution (PRD). In the 2006 general election he was elected to the Chamber of Deputies to represent the second district of Guerrero during the 60th Congress. He had previously served two non-consecutive terms as municipal president of Teloloapan between 1996 and 2005.
