= Pablo L. Sidar National Airport =

Pablo L. Sidar National Airport Aeropuerto Nacional Pablo L. Sidar
- IATA: AZG; ICAO: MMAG; LID: AZG

Summary
- Airport type: Public
- Operator: Michoacan State Government
- Serves: Apatzingán
- Location: Apatzingán municipality
- Elevation AMSL: 1,033 ft (315 m)
- Coordinates: 19°05′38″N 102°23′29″W

Map
- Location of the airport in Michoacan AZG (Mexico)

Runways
Direction	Length		Surface
Direction	ft	m	Surface
07/25	4,900	1,493	Asphalt

Statistics (2024)
- Bassed aircraft: 2
- AFAC

Pablo L. Sidar National Airport (IATA: AZG, ICAO: MMAG, AFAC LID: AZG) is an airport located in Apatzingán, Michoacán and is operated by Michoacán State Government.

== History ==
The first aircraft to land in Apatzingán did so on November 20, 1929, piloted by Pablo L. Sidar. To achieve this, Colonel Arturo Chávez led around fifty farmers from the region to build an improvised landing strip measuring 600 meters long and 40 meters wide. The landing strip was located on the current Bonifacio Moreno neighbourhood.

The region was gaining economic importance due to the high agricultural activity, so agricultural aviation was increasing and with it the need for a new airport arose, so Lázaro Cárdenas, being executive member of the Tepalcatepec Commission, acquired the land for the construction of the Pablo L. Sidar Airport in June 1953, a year later, a dirt landing strip was built. In 1976, 800 meters of runway were paved, later in 1980 the landing strip was extended to 1,500 meters and the taxiways and the aviation apron were added.

In February 1993, Apatzingán Airport was the site of tests for the AAC Angel in order to demonstrate its capabilities on short runways and in severe weather conditions, a test that the AAC Angel successfully passed. Apatzingan Airport only maintained commercial operations until 2002 and in 2024 only 2 fixed-wing aircraft based at this airport were registered.

It has a 4,900-foot-long and 68-foot-wide runway, two taxiways, as well as a 26,900-square-foot general aviation apron, hangars, and a terminal building with administrative offices. In July 2012, an investment of 270 million pesos was announced for airport improvements. This would include expanding the runway and upgrading the administrative facilities.

== Statistics ==
During the existence of regional airlines Aero Cuahonte and Aero Sudpacífico, Apatzingán Airport operated regular flights to Morelia, Guadalajara, Lázaro Cárdenas, and Uruapan. The table only shows scheduled commercial and charter flights; military and general aviation flights are not included.[data missing]

Statistical Evolution of Pablo L. Sidar National Airport 1992-2002
Year	Flights	Passengers	Year	Flight	Passengers
1992	917	1,862	1998	603	5,237
1993	543	2,974	1999	604	4,667
1994	433	2,860	2000	553	3,163
1995	538	3,153	2001	343	1,718
1996	369	1,772	2002	24	113
1997	959	5,069	2003	0	0

== Accidents and incidents ==
- On December 9, 1992, a Britten-Norman BN-2B-27 Islander aircraft registered XA-RML, operated by Aero Sudpacífico, on a commercial flight between Apatzingán Airport and Zamora Airport, crashed over the Tancítaro municipality a few minutes after takeoff, killing all 8 passengers and the pilot. It is alleged that the aircraft had an engine shutdown due to icing in the carburetors; this aircraft was on a flight between Uruapan Airport and Guadalajara Airport with intermediate stops in Apatzingán and Zamora.
