= Cuauhtémoc Salgado =

Mexican politician (born 1965)

- Born: 1 March 1965 (age 61); Ciudad Altamirano, Guerrero, Mexico
- Education: UAEM
- Occupation: Politician
- Political party: PRI

Cuauhtémoc Salgado Romero (born 1 March 1965) is a Mexican politician from the Institutional Revolutionary Party (PRI). He has been elected to the Chamber of Deputies on two occasions: in the 1997 mid-terms and in the 2009 mid-terms, both times for Guerrero's first district. He has also served as a local deputy in the Congress of Guerrero.
