= Catalino Duarte Ortuño =

Mexican politician

- Born: 23 March 1970 (age 56); Zirándaro de los Chávez, Guerrero, Mexico
- Education: UAGro
- Occupation: Deputy
- Political party: PRD

Catalino Duarte Ortuño (born 23 March 1970) is a Mexican politician affiliated with the Party of the Democratic Revolution (PRD). In the 2012 general election he was elected to the Chamber of Deputies to represent the first district of Guerrero during the 62nd Congress. He had previously served in the Congress of Guerrero.
