= Pineda, Guerrero =

Village in Mexico

Coordinates: 18°10′N 100°45′W

Pineda is a small village in the municipality of Coyuca de Catalan, state of Guerrero, Mexico. It is in the region known as Tierra Caliente and is at an altitude of 360 metres (1,180 ft).

Its history goes back to indigenous peoples, known as the Talistaca. Shortly after the Spanish Conquest, a family with the surname Pineda built haciendas on the lands formerly occupied by the Talistaca. These eventually developed into a village, which was named after the family.

According to data from the Instituto Nacional de Estadística y Geografía, the census of 2005 showed Pineda with a population of 842 inhabitants, of whom 413 were men and 429 women.
