= Santa Barbara Regional Airport =

Santa Bárbara Regional Airport Aeropuerto Regional de Santa Bárbara
- IATA: none; ICAO: MM35; LID: CAT

Summary
- Airport type: Public
- Serves: Ciudad Altamirano, Guerrero
- Coordinates: 18°19′48″N 100°38′00″W

Map

Runways
| Direction | Length | | Surface |
| Direction | ft | m | Surface |
|---|---|---|---|
| 33/15 | 4,615 | 1,406 | Asphalt |

Statistics (2021)
- Total passengers: N/A
- Source: Agencia Federal de Aviación Civil

The Santa Bárbara Regional Airport is an airport located in Santa Bárbara, Guerrero, Mexico. It serves the city of Ciudad Altamirano, Guerrero. The airport is located about 3 km east of the city of Ciudad Altamirano. Currently, there are no scheduled air carriers who serve the airport. Its main air traffic is general aviation and military aviation. There are an average of five landings per week, with its busiest season being December, in which average operations reach up to three operations per day.

== Statistics ==
Santa Barbara Regional Airport had regular flights to Morelia and Huetamo during the existence of Aero Sudpacífico.

Flights from Santa Barbara Regional Airport by year 1992-1995
| Year | Flights | Passengers |
|---|---|---|
| 1992 | 28 | 53 |
| 1993 | 2 | 34 |
| 1994 | 26 | 121 |
| 1995 | 8 | 32 |

== Accidents and incidents ==
- On 10 March 2023, a Beechcraft 55 Baron registered as XB-NXB flying between Ciudad Altamirano airport and Zihuatanejo airport derailed while taking off. It stopped in a field next to the airport, leaving its four occupants with minor injuries.
