= Ixcapuzalco =

City in the Mexican state of Guerrero

- Municipal seat and city
- Location in Mexico Ixcapuzalco (Mexico)
- Coordinates: 18°36′N 99°55′W
- Country: Mexico
- State: Guerrero
- Municipality: Pedro Ascencio Alquisiras
- Time zone: UTC-6 (Zona Centro)

Ixcapuzalco is a city and seat of the municipality of Pedro Ascencio Alquisiras, in the Mexican state of Guerrero.

== History ==
In the prehispanic period, Ixcapuzalco was known as Tzicapuzalco ("in the anthill" in Nahuatl) and belonged to the Aztec tributary province of Tlachco (centered in Taxco), though it had subjects of its own. According to the Relaciones geográficas, Tzicaputzalco and its subjects spoke an unattested language referred to as "Mazatec", of uncertain affiliation and not necessarily related to the Mazatecan languages of Oaxaca. Peter Gerhard hypothesized that this was an alternative name for the Mazahua language, whereas Donald Brand suspected that the Mazatec presence in this region was the result of Aztec population transfers.
