= Tetipac =

City in the Mexican state of Guerrero

- Municipal seat and city
- Location of Tetipac Tetipac (Mexico)
- Coordinates: 18°39′N 99°40′W
- Country: Mexico
- State: Guerrero
- Municipality: Tetipac
- Time zone: UTC-6 (Zona Centro)

Tetipac is a city and seat of the municipality of Tetipac, in the Mexican state of Guerrero.
