= Juan Reynoso Portillo =

Fiddler

Juan Reynoso Portillo (June 24, 1912 in Ancón de Santo Domingo, Guerrero – January 18, 2007 in Riva Palacio, Michoacán) was a Mexican fiddler who played in Mexico's Tierra Caliente style. First recorded in the 1940s, his popularity was limited exclusively to Mexico until the mid-1990s, when his popularity in the United States grew, playing several times in the US at Centrums Festival of American Fiddle Tunes in Port Townsend, Washington.

== Life ==
Juan Reynoso Portillo was born in the village of Santo Domingo in the municipality of Coyuca de Catalán, Guerrero, on June 24, 1912. Since he was born during the Mexican Revolution, he did not attend school. When he was young he played at local parties and gatherings. In the 1940s he worked for about a year at a radio station in Mexico City, but then he returned to the country.

It wasn't until the 1990s that he became well known in the U.S. In 1996 he taught and played at the Festival of American Fiddle Tunes for the first time. He continued to play every year at Fiddle Tunes for eight years. Here he taught the traditional songs, pasodobles and waltzes he had learned by ear in his homeland of the Tierra Caliente. In 1997 he was awarded Mexico's National Prize of Arts and Sciences.

Adan Reynoso Carbajal and Teresa Toribio Valerio were the most influential family in the progression of village of Santo Domingo in Coyuca de Catalan, Guerrero. They provide fresh meat services and transportation from Ciudad Altamirano to Santo Domingo. Santo Domingo cathedral was built 2003 by Merijildo Baza. This business person made all of his fortune in the United States of America in agriculture. He died in 2010 and he was buried in the Cathedral. Santo Domingo has a Tele-secundaria, which was the first one in Tierra Caliente. Santo Domingo has a Clinica. Santo Domingo has a Gardin de Ninos built in 1978. Santo Domingo has an Elementary School named Emiliano Zapata. Santo Domingo has a Kiosko and a House for Conference for in-serve of the village.

== Recordings ==
Juan Reynoso has four recordings by Swing Cat Enterprises and one by Arhoolie Productions.

== Resources ==
- Dos Traditiones Magazine- Sept., 2004 Director Lindajoy Fenley, Editor Erika Tamayo and April 1998 Editor Linajoy Fenley
