= Flor Añorve Ocampo =

Mexican politician (born 1961)

- Born: 21 March 1961 (age 65); Taxco, Guerrero, Mexico
- Occupation: Politician
- Political party: PRI

Flor Añorve Ocampo (born 21 March 1961) is a Mexican politician from the Institutional Revolutionary Party (PRI). In the 2000 general election she was elected to the Chamber of Deputies to represent the second district of Guerrero during the 58th Congress.
