= The Violin =

2005 film

- Film poster
- Spanish: El violín
- Directed by: Francisco Vargas
- Written by: Francisco Vargas
- Produced by: Ángeles Castro; Hugo Rodríguez
- Starring: Ángel Tavira
- Cinematography: Martín Boege
- Edited by: Ricardo Garfias
- Distributed by: Canana Films
- Release date: 11 March 2005
- Running time: 98 minutes
- Country: Mexico
- Language: Spanish

The Violin (Spanish: El violín) is a 2005 Mexican drama film directed by Francisco Vargas. It was screened in the Un Certain Regard section at the 2006 Cannes Film Festival.

== Cast ==
- Ángel Tavira as Don Plutarco
- Gerardo Taracena as Genaro
- Dagoberto Gama as Capitán
- Mario Garibaldi as Lucio
- Fermín Martínez as Teniente
- Silverio Palacios as Comandante Cayetano
- Octavio Castro as Zacarías
- Mercedes Hernández as Jacinta
- Gerardo Juárez as Pedro
- Ángeles Cruz as Jefa Guerrilera 1
- Norma Pablo as Jefa Guerrilllera 2
- Ariel Galvan as Joaquín
- Amorita Rasgado as Prostitutas
- María Elena Olivares as Doña Lupe
- Esteban Castellanos as Manuel

== Awards ==
The film won the Grand Prize in 2007 at the Miami International Film Festival. At the 2006 Cannes Film Festival, Ángel Tavira won the award for Best Male Performance (Prix d'Interprétation Masculine Un Certain Regard). It also received three Ariel Awards from the Mexican Academy of Film Arts and Sciences.
