= Otlatepec =

Town in the Mexican state of Guerrero

Otlatepec, Guerrero
- Town
- Nickname: Agua del Padre
- Location in Mexico
- Coordinates: 18°30′33″N 100°29′57″W
- Country: Mexico
- State: Guerrero
- Municipality: Tlalchapa
- Elevation: 340 m (1,120 ft)

Population (2005)
  - Total: 965
- Postal code: 40682

The town of Otlatepec, also known as Agua del Padre (Spanish: Water of the Father) is located in the Municipality of Tlalchapa in the Mexican state of Guerrero.

== Demography ==
As of 2000, Otlatepec had 697 inhabitants, 336 of them were males and 361 of them females. In 2005 there were 965 residents.

== Education ==
Otlatepec features a kindergarten "La Luz del Saber", a rural primary school, "Corregidora De Queretaro", and a secondary school, "Primer Congreso de Anahuac".
