= AAC Angel =

Twin-engine STOL utility aircraft

Model 44 Angel
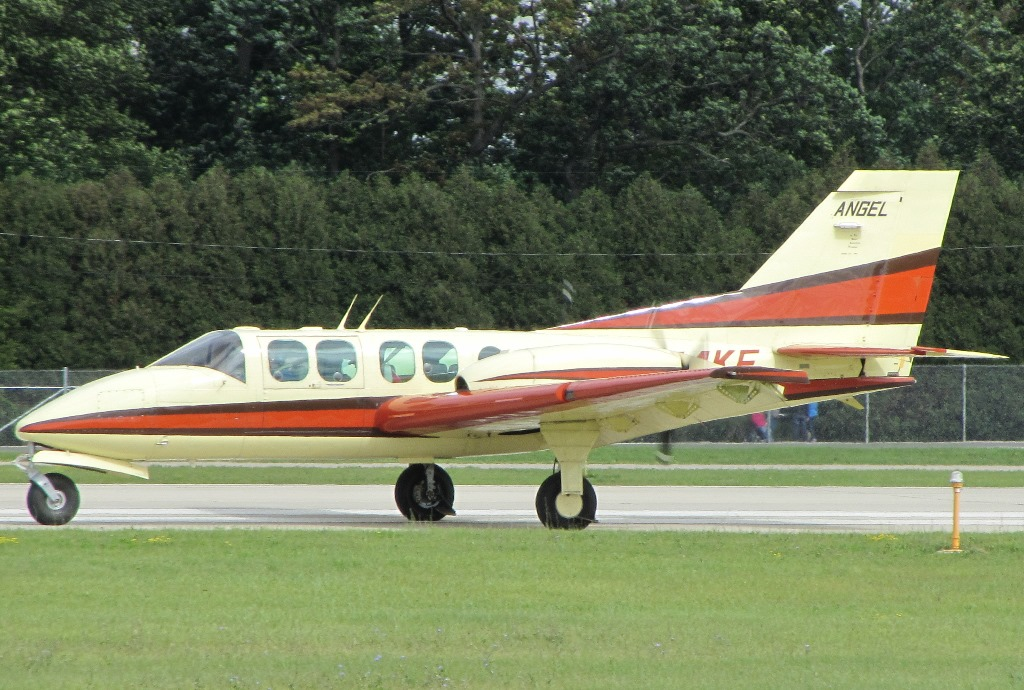
- Angel Aircraft Corporation Model 44 Angel

General information
- Type: STOL utility aircraft
- National origin: United States
- Manufacturer: Angel Aircraft Corporation
- Designer: Carl Mortenson
- Number built: 4

History
- First flight: 13 January 1984

The Angel Aircraft Corporation Model 44 Angel is a twin-engine STOL utility aircraft produced in the United States since the mid-1990s. Designed by Carl Mortenson and The King's Engineering Fellowship to be well-suited for missionary work from remote locations around the world, it is a low-wing cantilever monoplane with a retractable tricycle undercarriage and eight seats. The design is largely conventional, with the exception that the engine nacelles are mounted on top of the wings in a pusher configuration. Construction is aluminum throughout the airframe.

Design work began at the home of designer Carl Mortenson in 1972, with work on the prototype beginning in 1977, also from the designer's home. In 1980, the project was moved to Orange City Municipal Airport in Orange City, Iowa. The first flight took place on 13 January 1984, and FAA type certification was achieved on 20 October 1992. Angel Aircraft Corporation manufactures the aircraft under a license agreement with The King's Engineering Fellowship.

The aircraft was tested at Apatzingán Airport, Mexico, in February 1993 to demonstrate its capabilities on short runways and in severe weather conditions, a test which the AAC Angel successfully passed.

Four aircraft were produced between 1984 and 2008. However, in 2013, Hubei Taihang Xinghe Aircraft Manufacturing of China acquired a production license. The first Chinese example was substantially completed in May 2016 before the Hubei local government financed a manufacturing plant. The Model 44 was approved on 17 July 2015, by the Chinese National Civil Aviation Administration.

== Crashes ==
On 14 December 2019, an Angel 44 crashed into a field of corn near the airport at Mareeba, Queensland, Australia at 11.15am during what is believed to be a training flight. The aircraft has been said to be the only example of the type in Australia. The pilot, William Scott-Bloxam (73) and male passenger (63) died at the scene of the incident.

== Specifications ==
Data from Jane's All The World's Aircraft 1993–94

General characteristics

- Crew: one
- Capacity: seven
- Length: 33 ft 6 in (10.21 m)
- Wingspan: 39 ft 11.5 in (12.18 m)
- Height: 11 ft 6 in (3.51 m)
- Wing area: 225.4 sq ft (20.94 m^{2})
- Empty weight: 3,880 lb (1,760 kg)
- Gross weight: 5,800 lb (2,631 kg)
- Powerplant: 2 × Lycoming IO-540-M1C5 air-cooled flat-six, 300 hp (224 kW) each

Performance

- Maximum speed: 180 kn (207 mph, 333 km/h)
- Cruise speed: 169 kn (194 mph, 313 km/h) 65% power
- Stall speed: 57 kn (66 mph, 106 km/h)
- Range: 1,720 nmi (1,980 mi, 3,190 km) max, 1,248 nmi (2,311 km; 1,436 mi) at 65%
- Endurance: 13 h 6 min
- Service ceiling: 19,015 ft (5,796 m)
- Rate of climb: 1,345 ft/min (6.83 m/s)

== See also ==
- Evangel 4500 – another Mortenson twin-engine STOL design
