= Arcelia =

City in the Mexican state of Guerrero

- Municipal seat and city
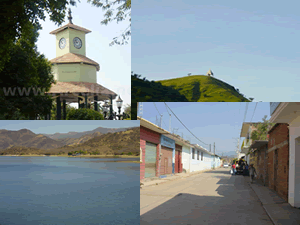

- Location in Mexico Arcelia (Mexico)
- Coordinates: 18°17′N 100°16′W
- Country: Mexico
- State: Guerrero
- Municipality: Arcelia

Population (2020)
  - Total: 22,534

Arcelia is a city and seat of the municipality of Arcelia, in the state of Guerrero, southern Mexico.
