= Daniel Torres García =

Mexican politician

- Born: 3 January 1968 (age 58); Chiapas, Mexico
- Occupation: Politician
- Political party: PRD

Daniel Torres García (born 3 January 1968) is a Mexican politician affiliated with the Party of the Democratic Revolution (PRD). In the 2006 general election he was elected to the Chamber of Deputies to represent the first district of Guerrero during the 60th Congress.
