= Álvaro Burgos Barrera =

Mexican politician

- Born: 22 January 1962 (age 64); Taxco, Guerrero, Mexico
- Occupation: Politician
- Political party: PRI

Álvaro Burgos Barrera (born 22 January 1962) is a Mexican politician affiliated with the Institutional Revolutionary Party. In the 2003 mid-terms he was elected to the Chamber of Deputies to represent the second district of Guerrero during the 59th session of Congress.
