= Acapetlahuaya =

Town in the Mexican state of Guerrero

- Municipal seat and town
- Location in Mexico Acapetlahuaya (Mexico)
- Coordinates: 18°25′N 100°4′W
- Country: Mexico
- State: Guerrero
- Municipality: General Canuto A. Neri

Population (2010)
  - Total: 1,618
- Time zone: UTC-6 (Central)

Acapetlahuaya is a town in the Mexican state of Guerrero. It serves as the seat of the municipality of General Canuto A. Neri.

Former mayor of Acapetlahuaya, Roger Arellano Sotelo, was murdered on April 9, 2017.
