= Ajuchitlán del Progreso (municipality) =

Municipality in the Mexican state of Guerrero

Ajuchitlán
- Municipality
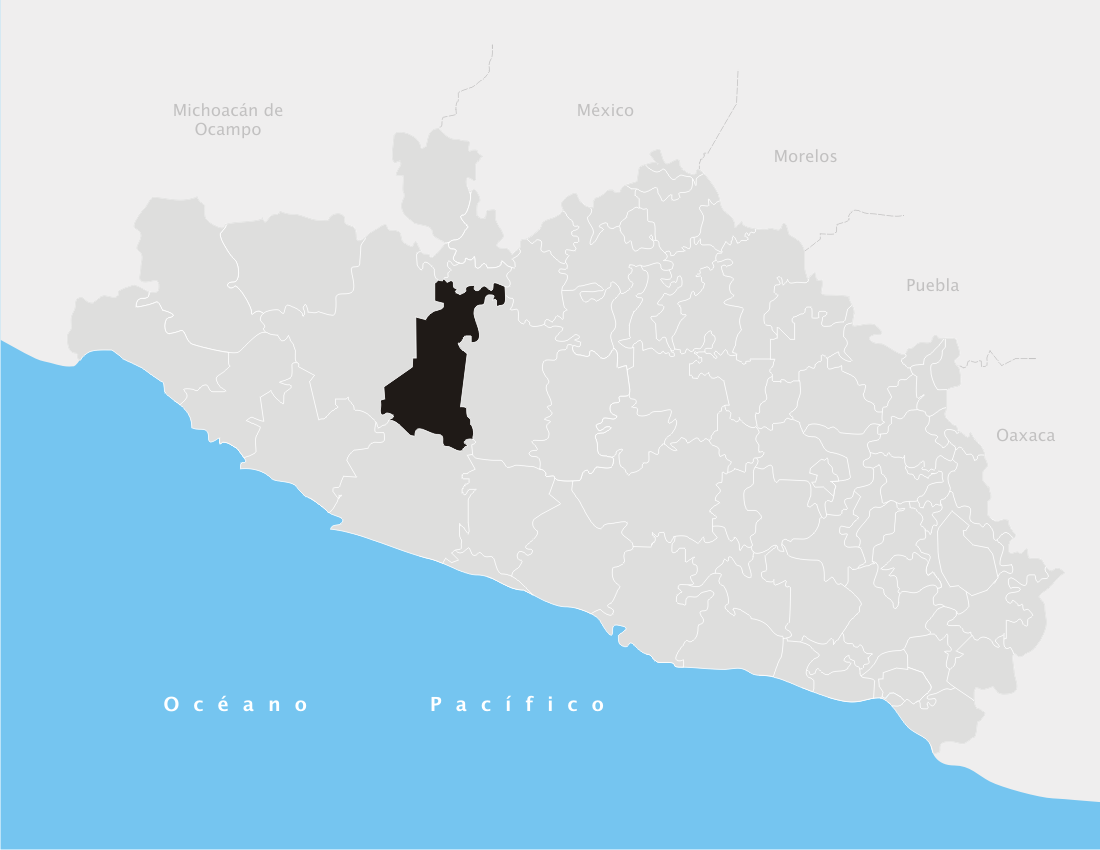
- Municipality of Ajuchitlán in Guerrero

- Location in Mexico
- Coordinates: 17°33′N 100°20′W
- Country: Mexico
- State: Guerrero
- Municipal seat: Ajuchitlán

Area
  - Total: 1,983.6 km^{2} (765.9 sq mi)

Population (2020)
  - Total: 37,655
- Time zone: UTC-6 (Central)
- Website: https://www.ajuchitlandelprogreso.gob.mx/

Ajuchitlán is a municipality in the Mexican state of Guerrero. The municipal seat lies at Ajuchitlán. The municipality covers an area of 1983.6 km^{2}.

In 2020, the municipality had a total population of 37,655, compared to 37,475 in 2005.
