= Gina Catalino =

American singer-songwriter

Gina Catalino (born 1984) is a New York-based folk-pop singer/songwriter. Two songs from her debut album Swept In Sound , "11:32 PM" and "Here & There", were featured in Showtime's television series The L Word. Gina has performed live on WNBC's Weekend Today In New York and has packed some New York City's most popular music venues including The Bitter End and Rockwood Music Hall. Her second record The Morning Shows Up Again was released on March 19, 2012.

== Biography ==
Gina Catalino (born in 1984) is a New Hampshire native singer-songwriter best known for her song, 11:32 PM. Music from Gina's debut record, Swept In Sound, has been featured in both film and television, most notably the placement of her song 11:32 PM in Showtime's hit series, The L Word. Gina has packed the house at some of New York City's most popular music venues, including The Bitter End and The Rockwood Music Hall. In March 2008, she performed two songs Live on WNBC's Weekend Today Show In New York.

Gina has spent the last few years in New York City writing and recording new material. After creating nearly forty songs, Gina chose ten for her second record entitled, The Morning Shows Up Again. For Catalino, The Morning Shows Up Again is a collection of songs that are honest, pure and optimistic. "Many of the songs have a longing for something but there is a sense that it will all somehow be ok," she explains.

The recording of The Morning Shows Up Again offered new experiences for Gina, including working with Grammy nominated singer Penny Nichols and Staten Island legend Karlus Trapp, both of whom provided backing vocals throughout the record. The core musicianship of the album is performed by Jordan Perlson on drums, Emilie Cardinaux and Brian Charette on piano, Solomon Dorsey and Jamie Bishop on bass, and Steve Elliot on electric guitar.

Gina's new record, The Morning Shows Up Again, was released on March 19, 2012.

"From song to song, you label her everything from the next Norah Jones, to the newest soul sister, to Ani DiFranco meets Jewel, until you finally settle on somewhere between Fiona Apple and Erykah Badu. It's all pointless because with each new listen, one comes to terms with the fact that they're listening to Gina Catalino. A woman whose music spiritually embodies an organically delicious sound juxtaposed with soul-baring lyrics and a commanding voice". - Robert Aguiar of Toastermag.com

== Television ==
- "Here & There", featured in The L Word, Season 5, Episode 2: "Look Out, Here They Come"
- "11:32 PM", featured in The L Word, Season 5, Episode 3: "Lady Of The Lake"
- On March 29, 2008 Gina was featured on WNBC's Weekend Today In New York television show where she was interviewed and performed two songs live.

== Discography ==
- 2007 - Swept In Sound
- 2012 - The Morning Shows Up Again
