= Tlapehuala (municipality) =

Municipality in the Mexican state of Guerrero

- Municipality
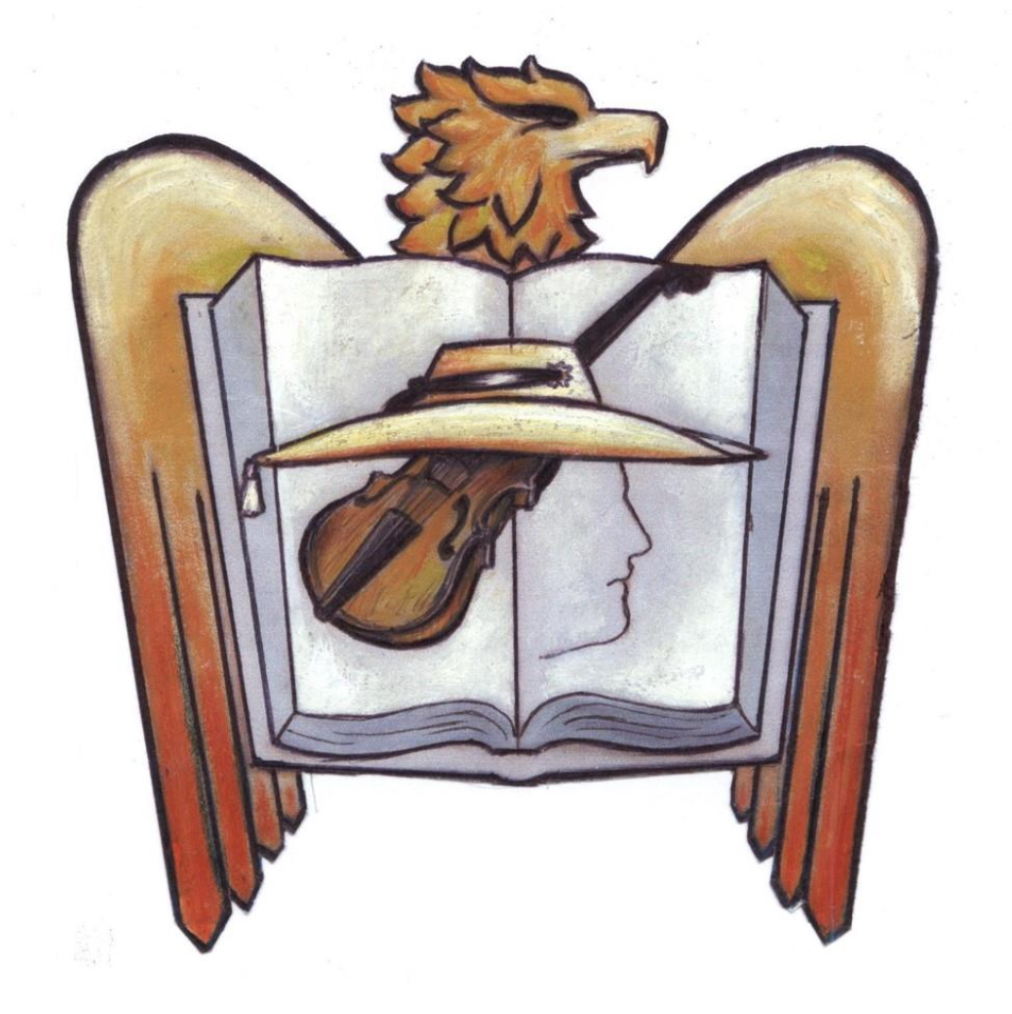
- Coat of arms

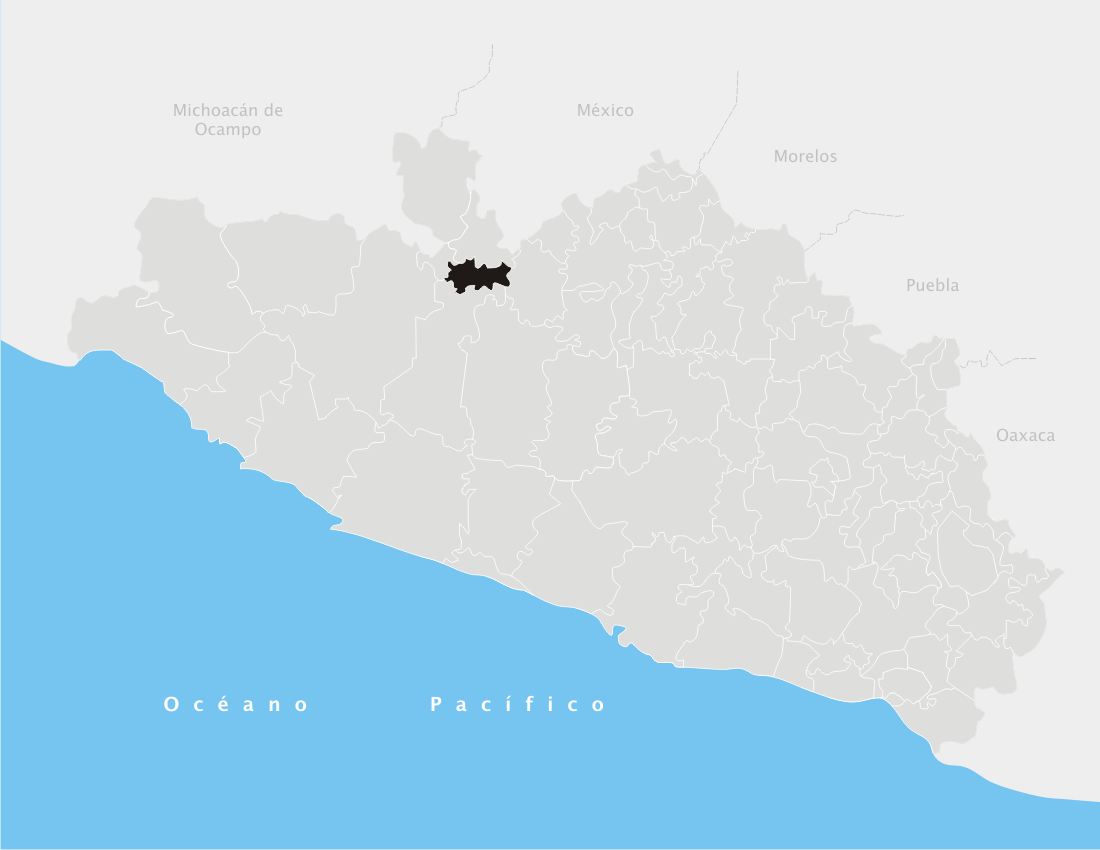
- Municipality of San Luis Acatlán in Guerrero

- Location in Mexico
- Coordinates: 18°13′N 100°17′W
- Country: Mexico
- State: Guerrero
- Municipal seat: Tlapehuala

Area
  - Total: 266.7 km^{2} (103.0 sq mi)

Population (2005)
  - Total: 20,989

Tlapehuala is a municipality in the Mexican state of Guerrero. The municipal seat lies at Tlapehuala. The municipality covers an area of 266.7 km^{2}.

As of 2005, the municipality had a total population of 20,989.

== History ==
Former mayor Aurelio Santamaría Bahena (MORENA), died on February 5, 2021, due to the COVID-19 pandemic in Mexico. As of February 18, there were 191 cases and 21 deaths in the municipality due to the pandemic.
