= Tlalchapa =

City in the Mexican state of Guerrero

- Municipal seat and city
- Location within Guerrero Location within Mexico
- Coordinates: 18°24′N 100°28′W
- Country: Mexico
- State: Guerrero
- Municipality: Tlalchapa
- Time zone: UTC-6 (Zona Centro)

Tlalchapa is a city and seat of the municipality of Tlalchapa, in the Mexican state of Guerrero. As of 2020, the city's population was 11,681.

On 13 March 2014, following a controversial court order, more than sixty thousand people protested in it.
