= Tlapehuala =

City in the Mexican state of Guerrero

- Municipal seat and city
- Location within Guerrero Location within Mexico
- Coordinates: 18°13′N 100°31′W
- Country: Mexico
- State: Guerrero
- Municipality: Tlapehuala
- Time zone: UTC-6 (Zona Centro)

Tlapehuala is a city and seat of the municipality of Tlapehuala, in the Mexican state of Guerrero.

== Origins ==
The original name of Tlapehuala was “Acatzécuaro.” In the book Crónicas de Tierra Caliente (Chronicles of Tierra Caliente) by Alfredo Mundo Fernández, the meaning of Acatzécuaro in the Purépecha language is explained in detail. Later, after the arrival of Fray Juan Bautista Moya in Tierra Caliente between 1554 and 1567, he gathered the Indians of Acatzécuaro and nearby places, naming the town “Tlapeuali,” which is Nahuatl and means “conquered,” according to Historia de Tierra Caliente (History of Tierra Caliente). According to data from the “Americana Thebaida” of 1729, it was Bautista Moya who also built a church in Tlapehuala after those in Ciudad Altamirano, Pungarabato, and Cutzamala de Pinzón.

Tlapehuala appears as belonging to Pungarabato in the Morelia manuscript found in 1971 and dated 1631. Later, in 1825 and 1831, it also appears within the municipality of Pungarabato, belonging to the District of Huetamo. Later, it also depended on Pungarabato according to the ‘'Noticias’' (News) of Dr. José Guadalupe Romero from 1860. The municipality of Tlapehuala was formed with a fraction of the municipality of Pungarabato and another fraction of the municipality of Ajuchitlán del Progreso by Decree No. 43 of November 3, 1947.

According to legend, it was here that Gabino Barrera was assassinated, a fact that no history book on the region during the Mexican Revolution of 1910 mentions.
