= Tlalchapa (municipality) =

Municipality in the Mexican state of Guerrero

- Municipality
- Location in Mexico
- Coordinates: 18°16′N 100°16′W
- Country: Mexico
- State: Guerrero
- Municipal seat: Tlalchapa

Area
  - Total: 414.3 km^{2} (160.0 sq mi)

Population (2005)
  - Total: 11,286

Tlalchapa is a municipality in the Mexican state of Guerrero. The municipal seat lies at Tlalchapa. The municipality covers an area of 414.3 km^{2}.

As of 2005, the municipality had a total population of 11,286.

== Towns and villages ==
- Otlatepec
- San Miguel Tecomatlán
- Cerrito
