= Pungarabato (municipality) =

Municipality in the Mexican state of Guerrero

- Municipality
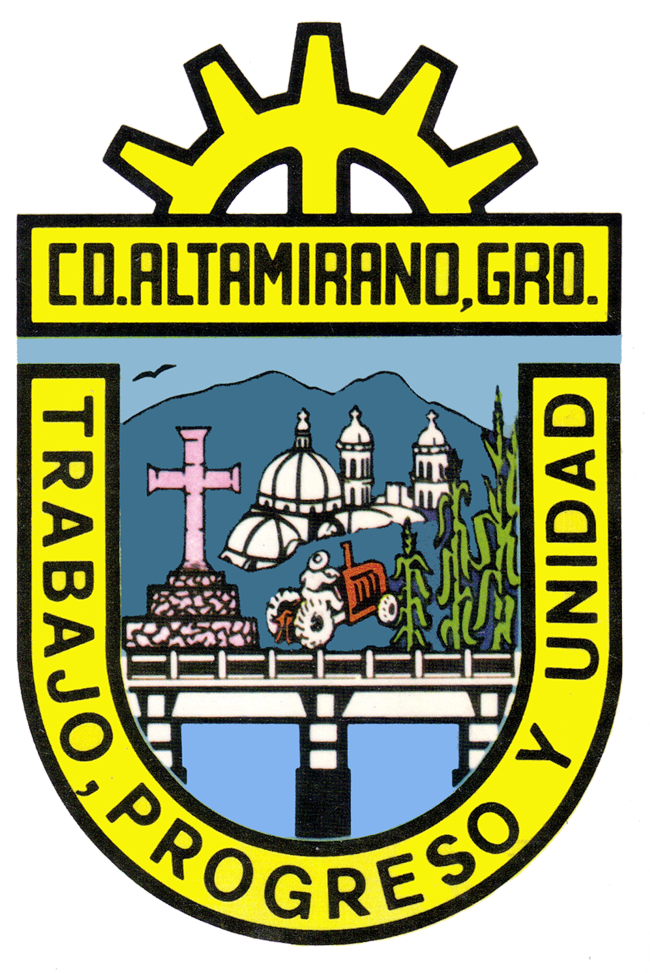
- Coat of arms

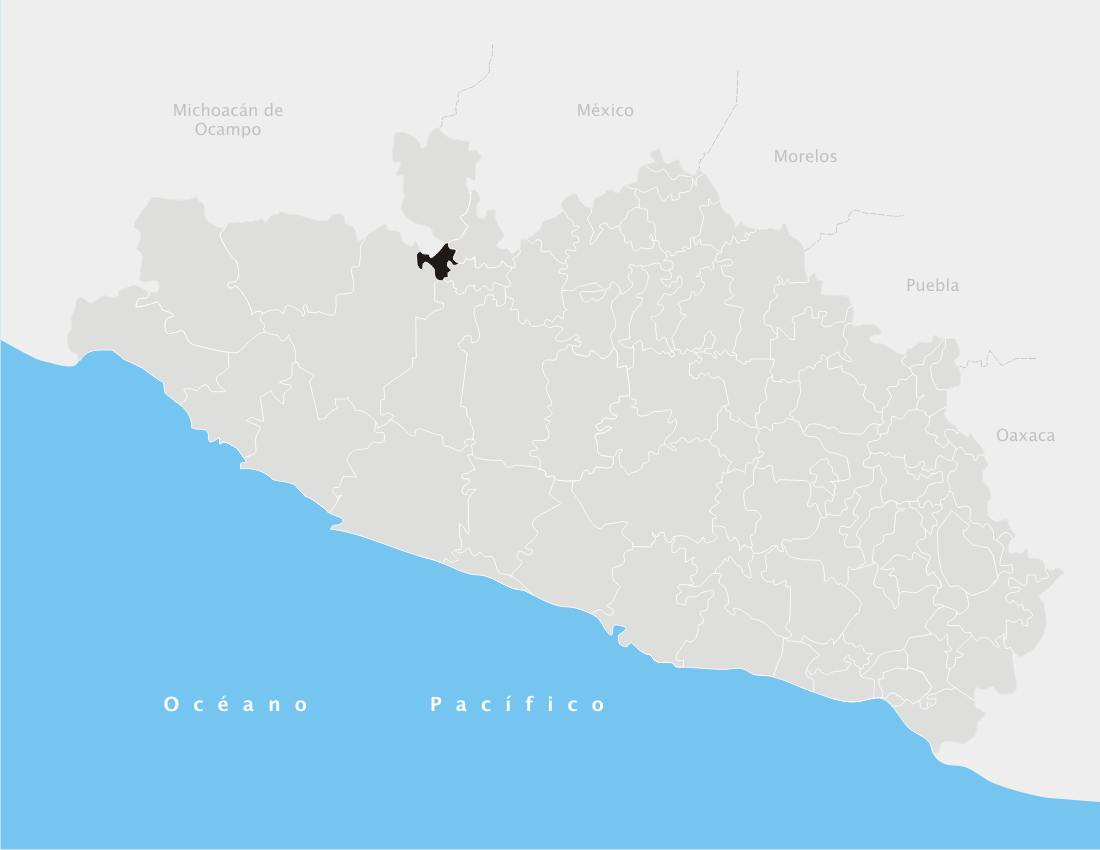
- Municipality of Pungarabato in Guerrero

- Location in Mexico
- Coordinates: 18°25′N 100°31′W
- Country: Mexico
- State: Guerrero
- Municipal seat: Ciudad Altamirano

Area
  - Total: 212.3 km^{2} (82.0 sq mi)

Population (2005)
  - Total: 36,466

Pungarabato is a municipality in the Mexican state of Guerrero. The municipal seat lies at Ciudad Altamirano. The municipality covers an area of 212.3 square kilometres (82.0 mi^{2}). As of 2005, the municipality had a total population of 36,466.
