= Catalino Luis Roy Ortiz =

Paraguayan politician

Catalino Luis Roy Ortiz served as the Paraguayan Minister of National Defense under President Fernando Lugo since June 2011.
