= Esteban Albarrán Mendoza =

Mexican politician

- Born: 30 June 1968 (age 57); Guerrero, Mexico
- Occupation: Politician
- Political party: PRI

Esteban Albarrán Mendoza (born 30 June 1968) is a Mexican politician from the Institutional Revolutionary Party. In the 2009 mid-terms he was elected to the Chamber of Deputies to represent the second district of Guerrero during the 61st Congress.

== See also ==
- 2015 Guerrero state election

| Preceded by Luis Mazón Alonso | Municipal President of Iguala, Guerrero; 2015—2018 | Succeeded by |
