= Arcelia (municipality) =

Municipality in the Mexican state of Guerrero

- Municipality
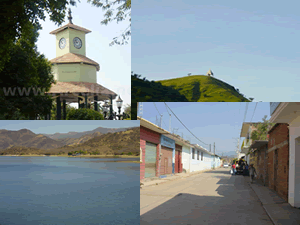

- Coat of arms

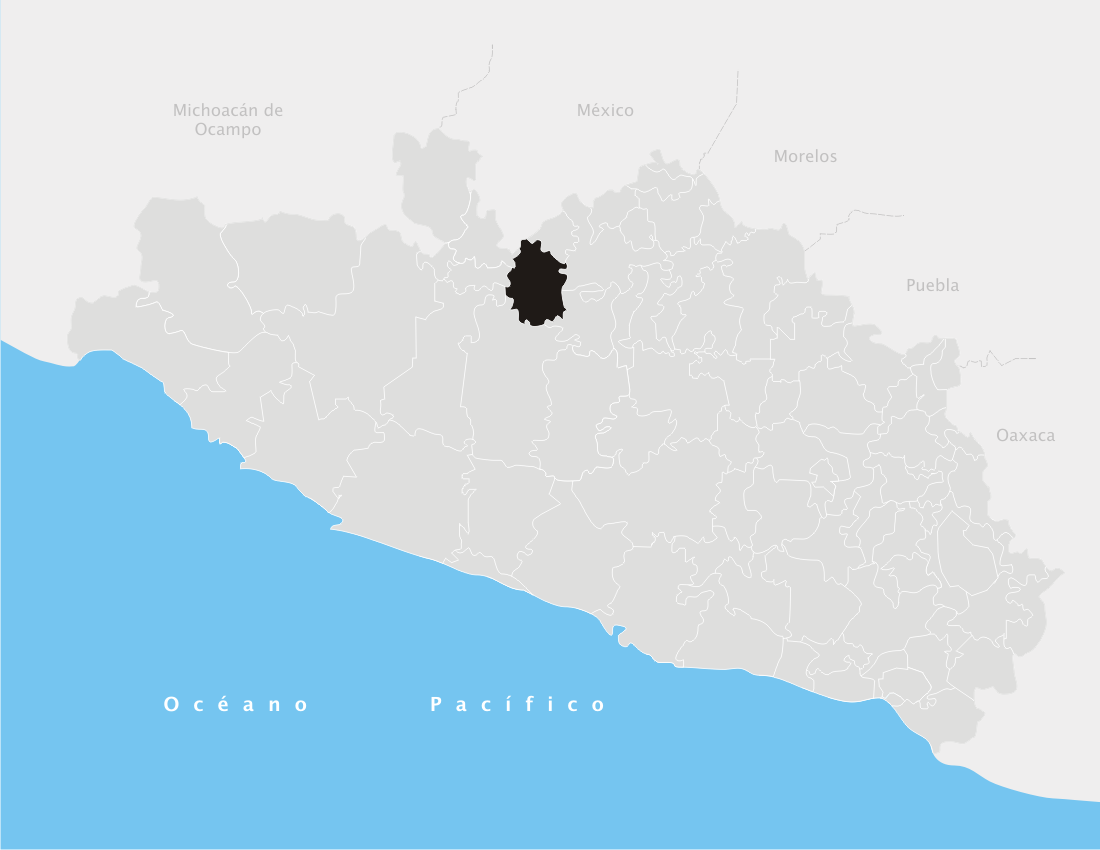
- Municipality of Arcelia in Guerrero

- Location in Mexico
- Coordinates: 18°17′N 100°16′W
- Country: Mexico
- State: Guerrero
- Municipal seat: Arcelia

Area
  - Total: 725.1 km^{2} (280.0 sq mi)

Population (2005)
  - Total: 31,401

Arcelia is a municipality in the Mexican state of Guerrero. The municipal seat lies at Arcelia. The municipality covers an area of 725.1 km^{2}.

As of 2005, the municipality had a total population of 31,401.

Herón Sarabia Mendoza, candidate for Municipal President in 2018 (Morena) and another person were assassinated by La Familia Michoacana.
