= Zirándaro =

Municipality in the Mexican state of Guerrero

- Municipality
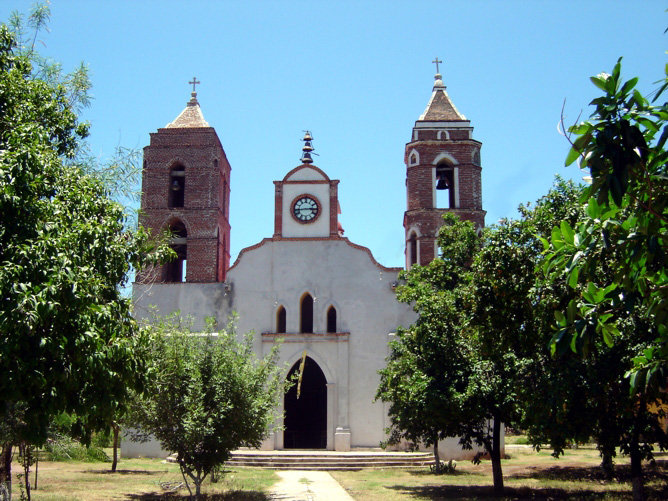

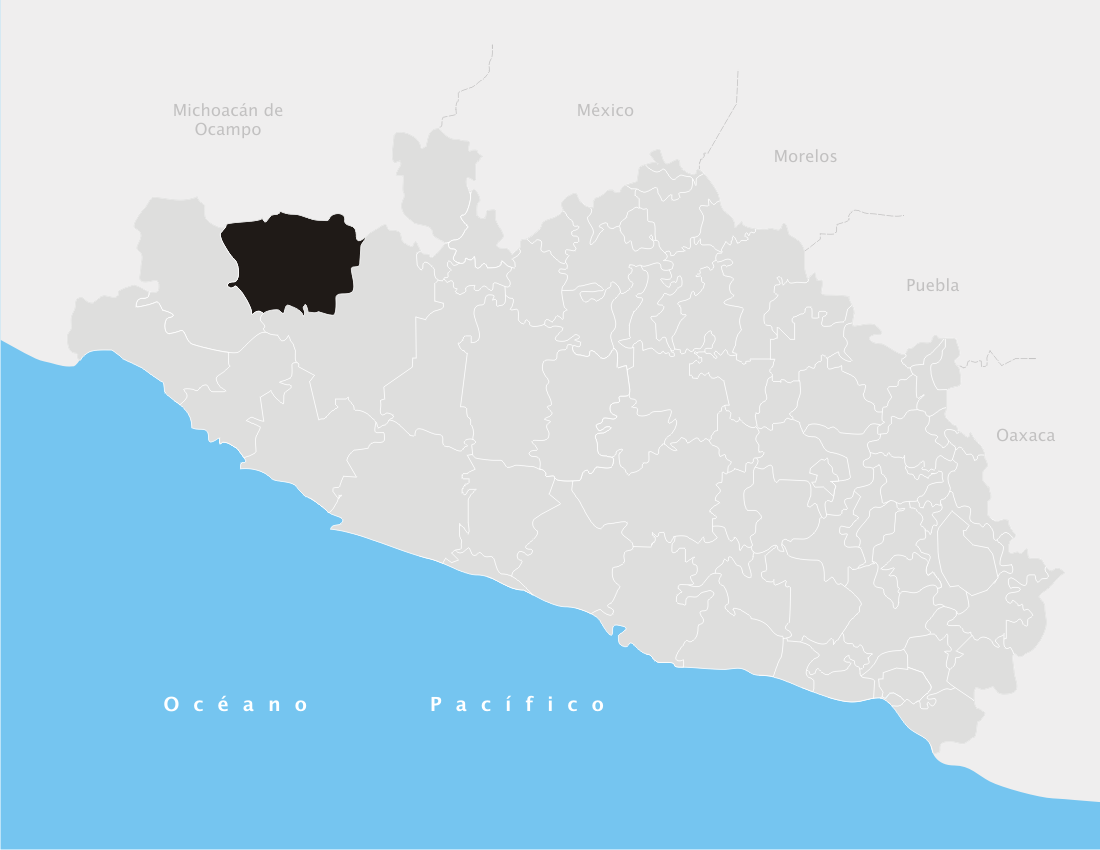
- Municipality of Zirándaro in Guerrero

- Location in Mexico
- Coordinates: 18°09′N 100°40′W
- Country: Mexico
- State: Guerrero
- Municipal seat: Zirándaro de los Chávez

Area
  - Total: 2,475.6 km^{2} (955.8 sq mi)

Population (2005)
  - Total: 20,053
- Time zone: UTC-6 (Zona Centro)
- Website: Ayuntamiento de Zirándaro, Guerrero

Zirándaro is a municipality in the Mexican state of Guerrero. The municipal seat lies at Zirándaro de los Chávez. The municipality covers an area of 2,475.6 km^{2}.

As of 2005, the municipality had a total population of 20,053.
