= Ajuchitlán =

City in the Mexican state of Guerrero

- Municipal seat and city
- Location within Guerrero Location within Mexico
- Coordinates: 18°9′N 100°29′W
- Country: Mexico
- State: Guerrero
- Municipality: Ajuchitlán del Progreso

Population (2020)
  - Total: 6,537
- Time zone: UTC-6 (Central)
- INEGI code: 120030001

Ajuchitlán is a city and seat of the municipality of Ajuchitlán del Progreso, in the state of Guerrero, southern Mexico.
