= Pedro Ascencio Alquisiras =

Municipality in the Mexican state of Guerrero

- Municipality
- Location in Mexico
- Coordinates: 18°39′N 99°45′W
- Country: Mexico
- State: Guerrero
- Municipal seat: Ixcapuzalco

Area
  - Total: 510.1 km^{2} (197.0 sq mi)

Population (2005)
  - Total: 6,987

Pedro Ascencio Alquisiras is a municipality in the Mexican state of Guerrero. The municipal seat lies at Ixcapuzalco. The municipality covers an area of 510.1 square kilometres (197.0 sq mi).

In 2005, the municipality had a total population of 6,987.
