= Son calentano =

Mexican music genre

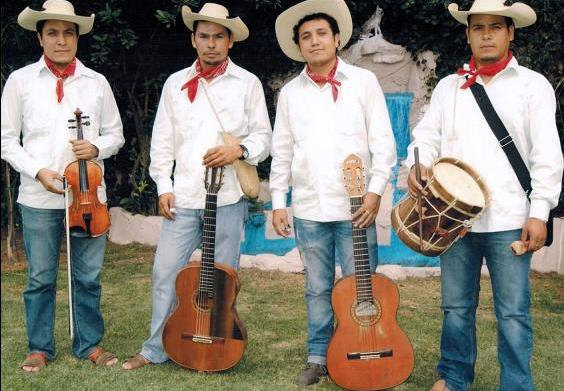
Conjunto calentano

The son calentano is an instrumental form of music from the Tierra Caliente region, Mexico. It has meters in 3/4 and 6/8, an ornamented use of violin and back beats on guitar and tamborita. It is usually played by conjunto calentano ensembles and is traditionally performed with dancers.
