= Coyuca de Catalán (municipality) =

Municipality in the Mexican state of Guerrero

- Municipality
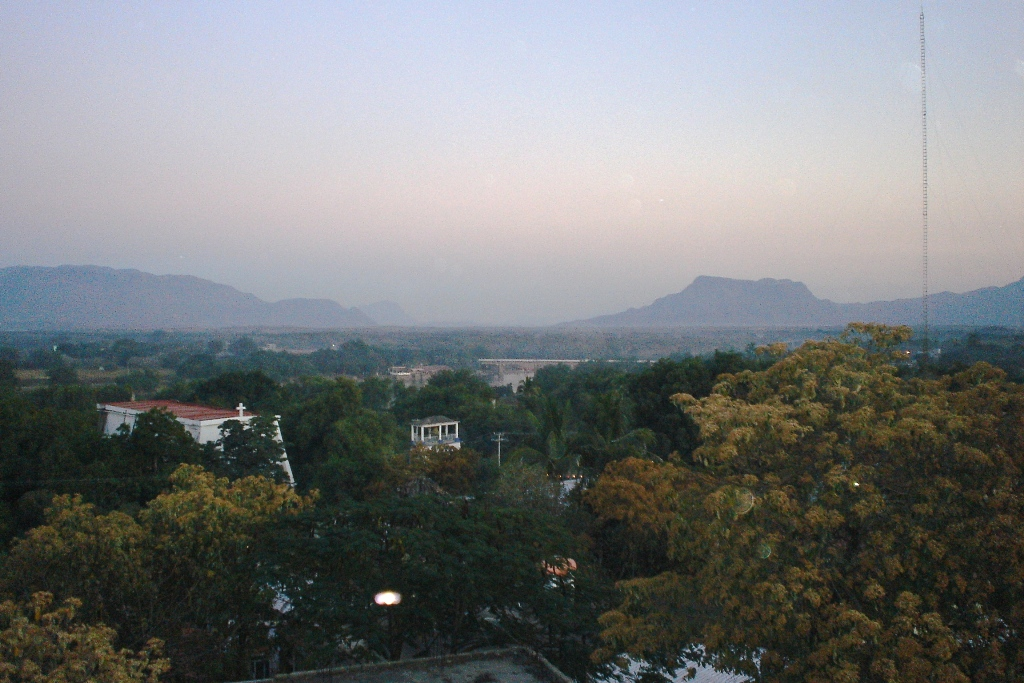

- Coat of arms

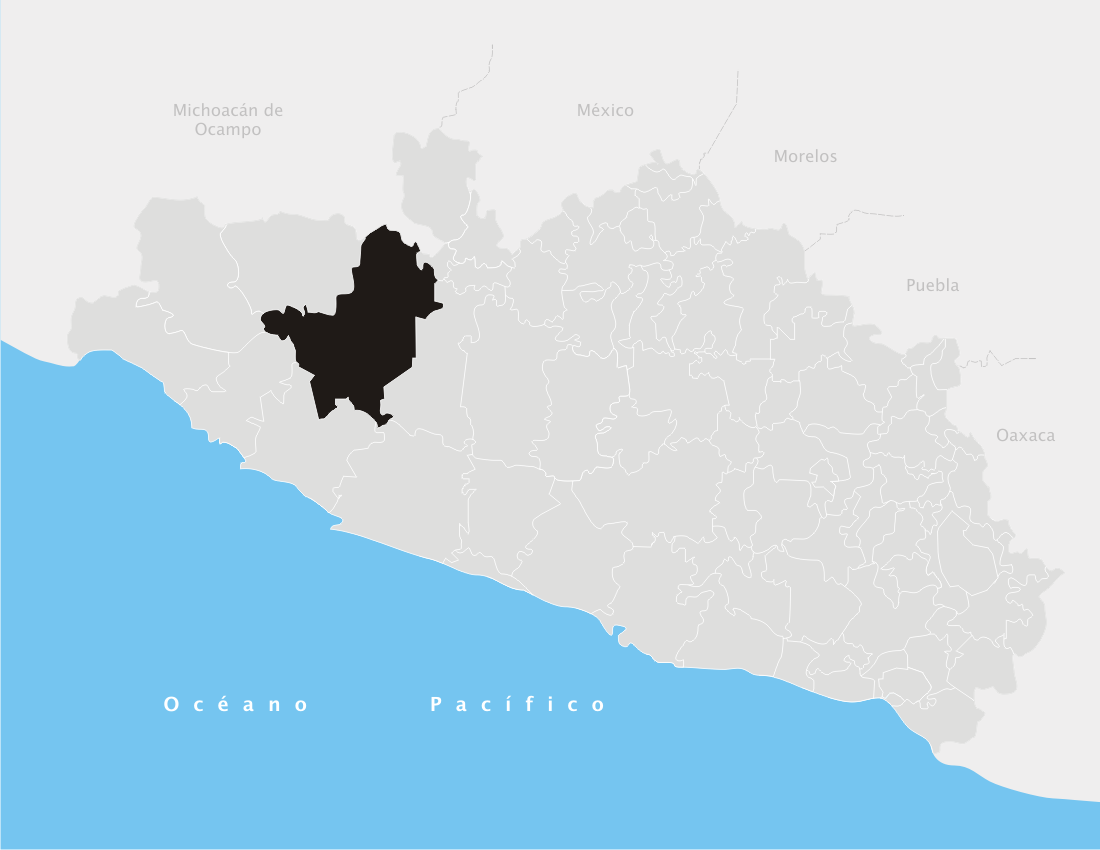
- Municipality of Coyuca de Catalán in Guerrero

- Location in Mexico
- Coordinates: 17°43′N 100°38′W
- Country: Mexico
- State: Guerrero
- Municipal seat: Coyuca de Catalán

Area
  - Total: 921.9 km^{2} (355.9 sq mi)

Population (2005)
  - Total: 41,975

Coyuca de Catalán is a municipality in the Mexican state of Guerrero, being the largest municipality in Guerrero. The municipal seat lies at Coyuca de Catalán. The municipality covers an area of 921.9 km^{2}.

As of 2005, the municipality had a total population of 41,975.

There were 234 confirmed cases and 24 deaths related to the COVID-19 as of February 24, 2021.

== Geography ==
=== Towns and villages ===
In 2005 there were 376 settlements. The largest are as follows:

Localidad	Población
Total Municipio	41,975
Coyuca de Catalán	7,435
Amuco de la Reforma	2,661
Paso de Arena	2,272
Placeres del Oro	1,693
Santa Teresa	1,454
Patambo	1,076
Santo Domingo	1,442

== Administration ==
=== Municipal presidents ===
President	Period
Enrique Gomezcaña Nájera	1963-1965
Joel Antuñez Barrera	1966-1968
José Garibaldi Gómez Huerta	1969-1971
Humberto Nàjera Gomezcaña	1972-1974
Alicia Buitrón Brugada	1975-1977
Luis Brugada Echeverría	1978-1980
Celestino Araujo Goicochea	1981-1983
José Gómez Suazo	1984-1986
Ignacio Domínguez Morales	1987-1989
Salathiel Romero Martínez	1990-1993
Martín Montaño Buitrón	1993-1996
Abel Echeverría Pineda	1996-1999
Rafael Higuera Sandoval	1999-2002
Alfonso Manjarrez Gómez	2002-2005
Andrés Peralta Santamaría (Interino)	2005
Felipe de Jesús Cabrera González (Interino)	2005
Orbelín Pineda Maldonado	2005-2008
Francisco Chávez Araujo (Interino)	2008
Elí Camacho Goichochea	2009-2012
Gerzain Chávez Gómez (Interino)	2012
Rey Hilario Serrano	2012-2015
Abel Montufar Mendoza	2015-2018
Juvenal Pineda Pineda (Interino)	2018
Eusebio Echeverría Tabares	2018-2021

== Organized crime ==
A group of gunmen entered Puerto El Bálsamo, burning 60 houses and looting 15 vinatas (mezcal factories) in 2020. 320 mezcal producers left the town of Zihuaquio on January 26, 2020 after attacks by criminal groups operating in the area. Mezcal provides income in several towns, but due to constant confrontations between alleged drug traffickers, people have had to leave and cannot harvest their crops.

Two women who had been kidnapped by La Familia Michoacana and eight members of the cartel were killed in a confrontation between members of the cartel and townspeople of Hacienda de Dolores on February 25, 2021.

Residents of Los Guajes de Ayala used social media in June 2021 to ask for federal help after three days of being held hostage by La Familia Michoacana. The area is in the middle of the gold and the drug trade.
