= Tetipac (municipality) =

Municipality in the Mexican state of Guerrero

- Municipality
- Location in Mexico
- Coordinates: 18°36′N 90°32′W
- Country: Mexico
- State: Guerrero
- Municipal seat: Tetipac

Area
  - Total: 269.3 km^{2} (104.0 sq mi)

Population (2005)
  - Total: 12,702

Tetipac is a municipality in the Mexican state of Guerrero. The municipal seat lies at Tetipac. The municipality covers an area of 269.3 km^{2}.

As of 2005, the municipality had a total population of 12,702.
