= General Canuto A. Neri =

Municipality in the Mexican state of Guerrero

- Municipality
- Location in Mexico General Canuto A. Neri (Mexico)
- Coordinates: 18°23′N 99°58′W
- Country: Mexico
- State: Guerrero
- Municipal seat: Acapetlahuaya

Area
  - Total: 300.4 km^{2} (116.0 sq mi)

Population (2020)
  - Total: 6,278
- Time zone: UTC-6 (Central)
- Website: canutoaneri.gob.mx

General Canuto A. Neri is a municipality in the Mexican state of Guerrero. The municipal seat lies at Acapetlahuaya. The municipality covers an area of 300.4 km^{2}.

In 2020, the municipality had a total population of 6,278, down from 6,394 in 2005.
