= Uruapan International Airport =

International airport in Uruapan, Michoacán, Mexico

Uruapan International Airport Aeropuerto Internacional de Uruapan
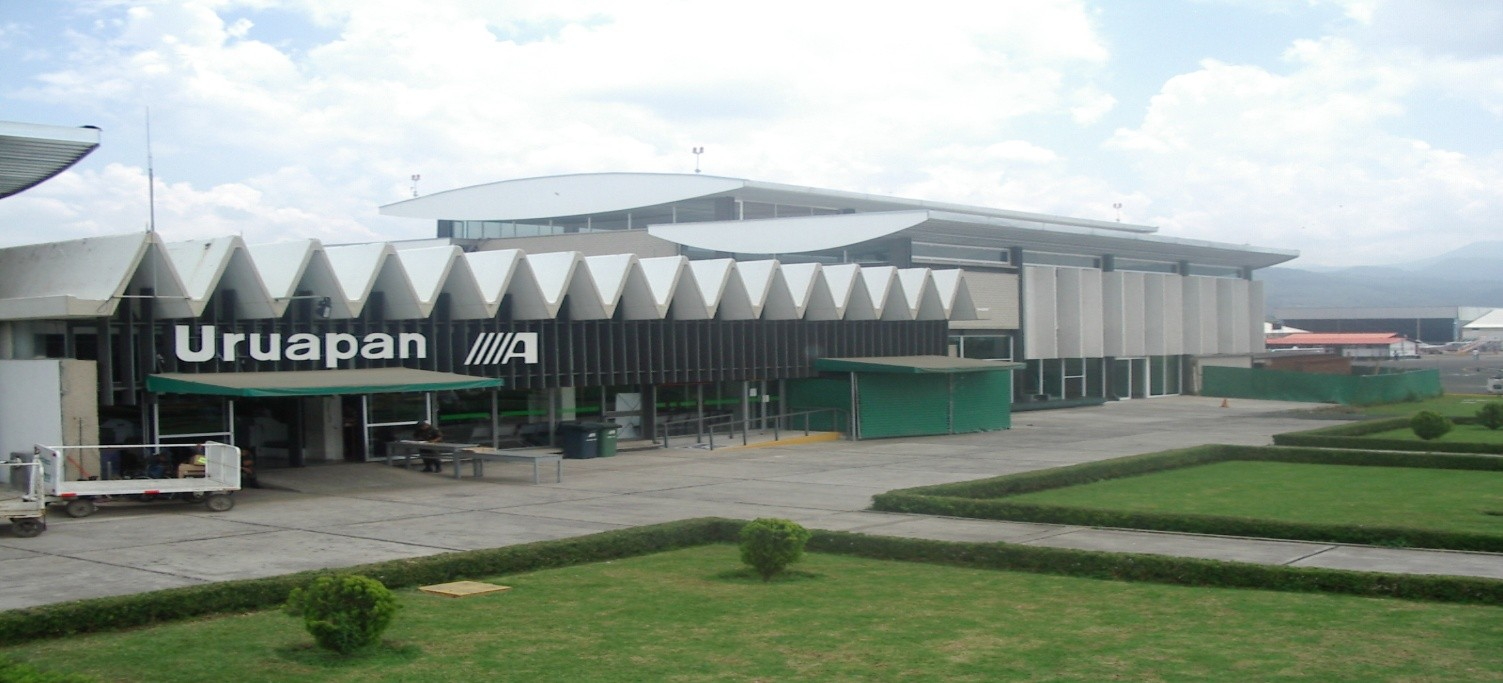
- IATA: UPN; ICAO: MMPN

Summary
- Airport type: Public
- Operator: Olmeca-Maya-Mexica
- Serves: Uruapan, Michoacán, Mexico
- Time zone: CST (UTC−06:00)
- Elevation AMSL: 1,603 m (5,259 ft)
- Coordinates: 19°23′48″N 102°02′21″W
- Website: www.grupomundomaya.com/UPN

Map
- Location of airport in Michoacán UPN (Mexico)

Runways
Direction	Length		Surface
Direction	m	ft	Surface
02/20	2,400	7,874	Asphalt

Statistics (2025)
- Total passengers: 175,010
- Ranking in Mexico: 48th
- Source: Agencia Federal de Aviación Civil

Uruapan International Airport (Spanish: Aeropuerto Internacional de Uruapan); officially Aeropuerto Internacional Lic. y Gen. Ignacio López Rayón (Lic. y Gen. Ignacio López Rayón International Airport) (IATA: UPN, ICAO: MMPN) is an international airport located in Uruapan, Michoacán, Mexico. It serves domestic and international flights and it supports flight training, executive aviation, and general aviation activities. Operated by Grupo Olmeca-Maya-Mexica (GAFSACOMM), a federal government-owned corporation, the airport is named after Ignacio López Rayón, a leader in the Mexican War of Independence. The airport served 172,193 passengers in 2024, a figure which increased slightly to 175,010 in 2025.

== History ==
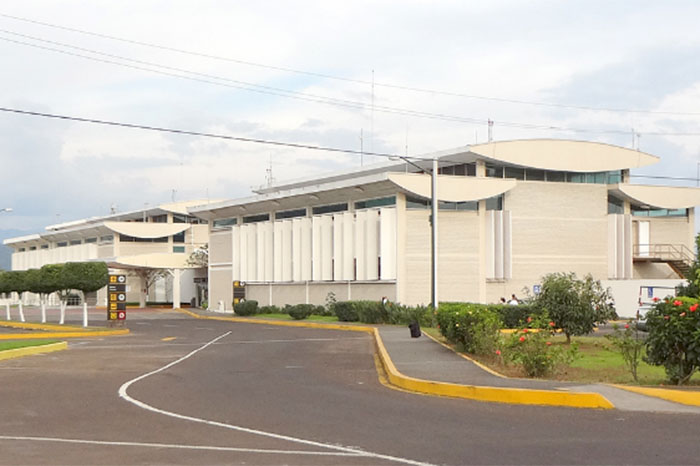
Passenger terminal entrance

The first air services to Uruapan began in 1937, connecting the city to Acapulco. The airport joined the Aeropuertos y Servicios Auxiliares (ASA) network in 1970. Regional airlines Aero Cuahonte and Aero Sudpacífico were once based here. Over the years, Uruapan Airport has been served by various airlines, including Aeromar, Avolar, Líneas Aéreas Azteca, and TAESA Airlines. Volaris launched the airport's first international service to Los Angeles in October 2012. In 2023, airport operations shifted to Grupo Olmeca Maya Mexica (GAFSACOMM), a military-owned entity, aligning with the López Obrador administration's strategy to involve the armed forces in major infrastructure projects.

== Facilities ==
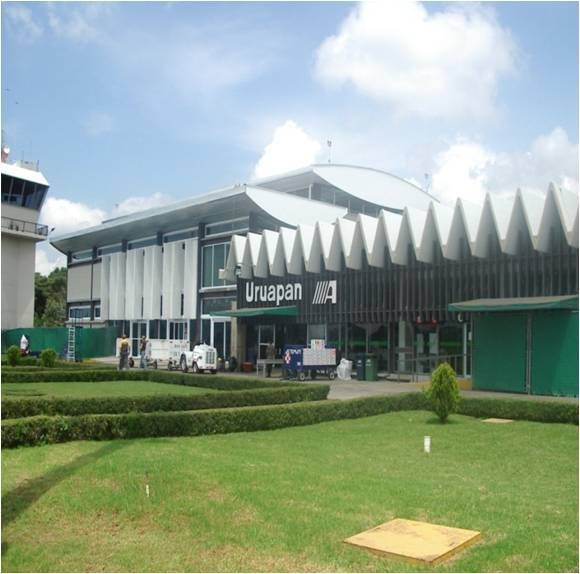
Passenger terminal airside

The airport is situated within the Uruapan urban area, covering an approximate area of 264 hectares (650 acres), at an elevation of 1,603 metres (5,259 ft) above sea level. It features a 2,400 metres (7,900 ft) asphalt runway, capable of accommodating aircraft like the Boeing 737 and Airbus A320. The commercial aviation apron spans 15,652 square metres (168,480 sq ft) and can accommodate three narrow-body aircraft. The airport operates daily from 07:00 to 19:00.

The passenger terminal, a two-story structure, accommodates arrivals and departures, offering standard services commonly found at regional airports. These services include parking facilities, a check-in area, a security checkpoint, a VIP lounge, retail outlets, immigration and customs facilities, baggage claim zones, an arrivals hall with car rental services and taxi stands, and a departure concourse with three gates providing direct access to the apron. With no jet bridges, passengers walk to their aircraft. The airport also houses logistics and courier companies, administrative, and police facilities.

== Airlines and destinations ==
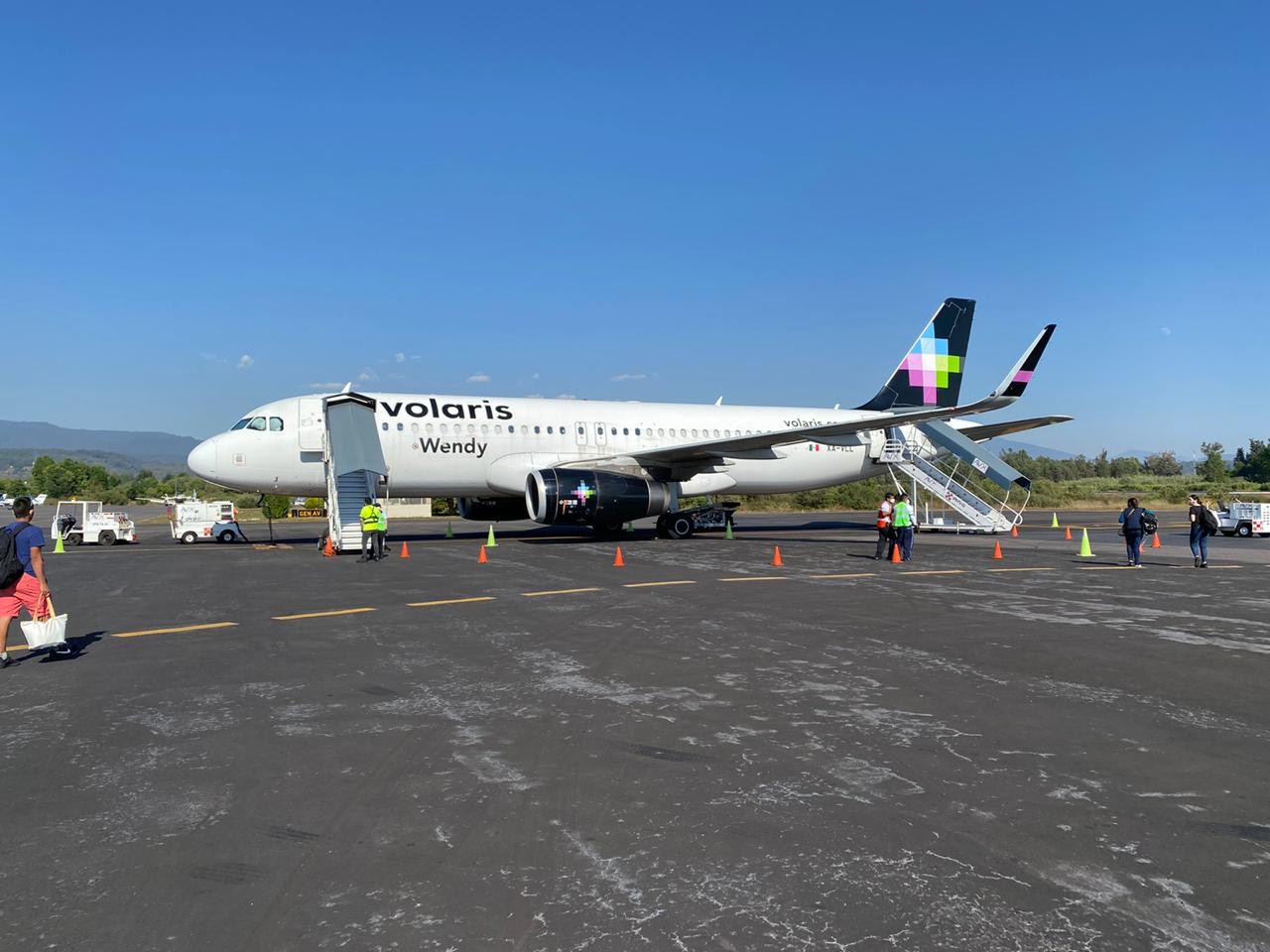
Volaris Airbus A320 at URU

=== Passenger ===
Airlines	Destinations
Volaris	Los Angeles, Tijuana

=== Destination maps ===
Domestic destinations from Uruapan International Airport
Red = Year-round destination
Blue = Future destination
Green = Seasonal destination
International destinations from Uruapan International Airport
Red = Year-round destination
Blue = Future destination
Green = Seasonal destination

== Statistics ==
=== Annual Traffic ===
Passenger statistics at Uruapan Airport
Year	Total Passengers	change %	Cargo movements (t)	Air operations
2006	150,047	Steady	251	7,569
2007	135,211	▼9.89%	221	6,869
2008	110,816	▼18.04%	71	7,417
2009	106,748	▼3.67%	9	7,159
2010	107,379	▲0.59%	11	6,481
2011	109,455	▲1.93%	1	6,312
2012	112,275	▲2.58%	11	5,509
2013	113,101	▲0.74%	40	5,074
2014	106,949	▼5.44%	28	4,866
2015	110,067	▲2.92%	1	4,816
2016	128,578	▲16.82%	0	4,145
2017	150,192	▲16.81%	0	4,485
2018	160,045	▲6.6%	-	5,201
2019	167,796	▲4.84%	0	5,123
2020	129,019	▼23.11%	0	4,238
2021	167,112	▲29.53%	0	5,032
2022	151,151	▼9.55%	0	4,599
2023	173,005	▲14.46%	0	4,546
2024	172,193	▼0.47%	0	4,819
2025	175,010	▲1.64%	0	4,992

== Accidents and incidents ==
- TAESA Flight 725, a DC-9, crashed on take-off from Uruapan International Airport en route to Mexico City on November 25, 1999, killing all 18 people on board.

== See also ==
- List of the busiest airports in Mexico
- List of busiest airports in North America
- List of the busiest airports in Latin America
- List of airports in Mexico
- List of airports by ICAO code: M
- Airline destinations: Mexico
- Aero Sudpacífico
- Transportation in Mexico
- Tourism in Mexico
