= Teloloapan (municipality) =

Municipality in the Mexican state of Guerrero

- Municipality
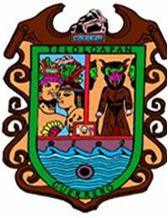
- Coat of arms

- Location in Mexico
- Coordinates: 18°13′N 99°38′W
- Country: Mexico
- State: Guerrero
- Municipal seat: Teloloapan

Area
  - Total: 1,116.1 km^{2} (430.9 sq mi)

Population (2005)
  - Total: 51,659

Teloloapan (Nahuatl: telólotl or telolotli, apan, 'guijarro o bodoque de piedra boluda, río' ‘río de guijarros o bodoques de piedra’) is a municipality in the Mexican state of Guerrero. The municipal seat is the city of Teloloapan. It is enclosed in the heart of the Southern Sierra Madre in the northern part of said region. It has the geographical coordinates 18°22′04″N 99°52′26″W and an altitude of 1,860 metres above sea level.

Teloloapan is one of the 81 municipalities of Guerrero, in south-western Mexico. The municipal seat lies at Teloloapan. The municipality covers an area of 1,116.1 km^{2}.

As of 2005, the municipality had a total population of 51,659.
