= Coyuca de Catalán =

City in the Mexican state of Guerrero

- Municipal seat and city
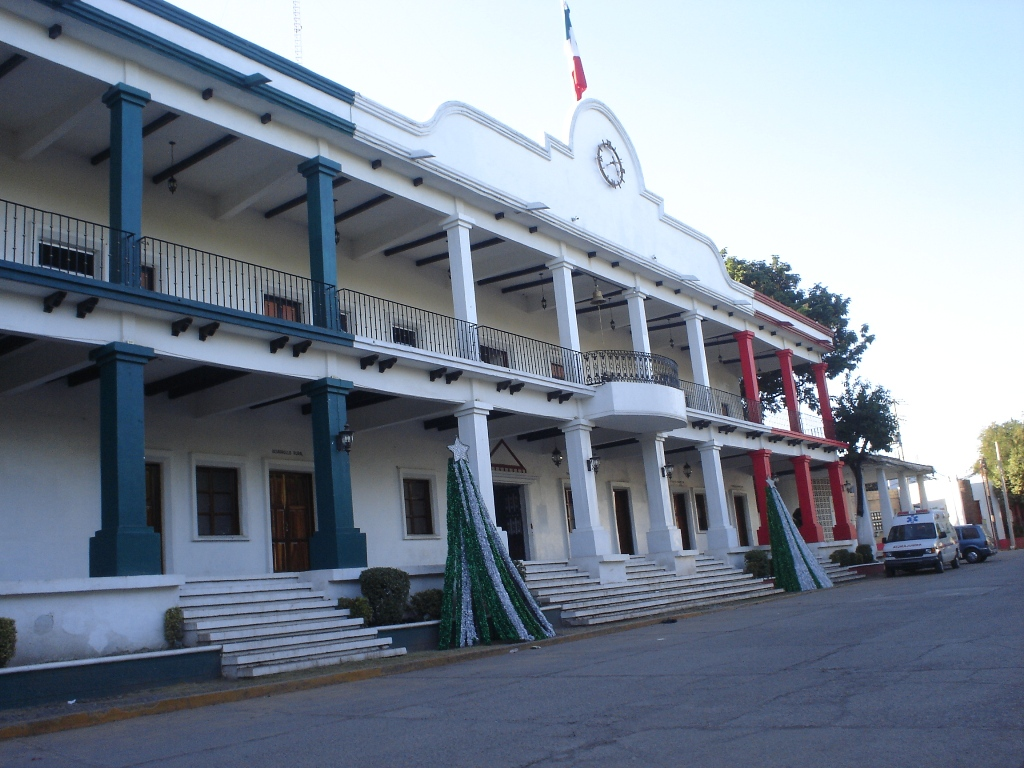

- Location in Mexico Coyuca de Catalán (Mexico)
- Coordinates: 18°19′32″N 100°41′57″W
- Country: Mexico
- State: Guerrero
- Municipality: Coyuca de Catalán
- Time zone: UTC-6 (Central)

Coyuca de Catalán is a city and seat of the municipality of Coyuca de Catalán, in the state of Guerrero, southern Mexico.

Formerly called Coyuca, the town was named Coyuca de Catalán in honour of Nicolás Catalán, son of Antonia Nava de Catalán and her husband Nicolás Catalán, who lost his life there during an action in the Mexican War of Independence.

== See also ==
- Pineda, Guerrero
