= Ciudad Altamirano =

City in the Mexican state of Guerrero

- Municipal seat and city
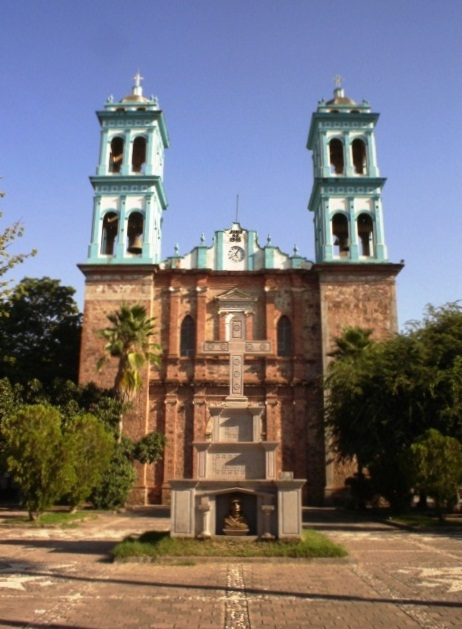
- Ciudad Altamirano Cathedral

- Location within Guerrero Location within Mexico
- Coordinates: 18.3472°N 100.6531°W
- Country: Mexico
- State: Guerrero
- Municipality: Pungarabato

Population (2020)
  - Total: 25,850

Ciudad Altamirano is a city of in the Mexican state of Guerrero (and partially in Michoacán) and serves as the municipal seat for Pungarabato. It is part of the Tierra Caliente region of said entity, on the border with the state of Michoacán.

It stands on the Cutzamala River, one of the main tributaries of the Balsas River, at a height of 230 metres (755 ft) above sea level.

The 2010 population was reported to be 37,035 by the Congress of Guerrero.

The city's name honours Ignacio Manuel Altamirano, a 19th-century president of the Supreme Court and writer born in Tixtla, Guerrero.

Ciudad Altamirano has a paved airport named Santa Bárbara Regional Airport. The name comes from the sister town next to Altamirano. Most (if not all) people refer to it as simply Altamirano Airport, or "Aeropuerto Altamirano". The airport does not have any airline services, so the only ones using it are locals who own airplanes. Recently, a small military base was located at the airport.

The Centro de Bachillerato Tecnológico Agropecuario No. 18, a high school, is located in Ciudad Altamirano.
