= Ixcateopan (archaeological site) =

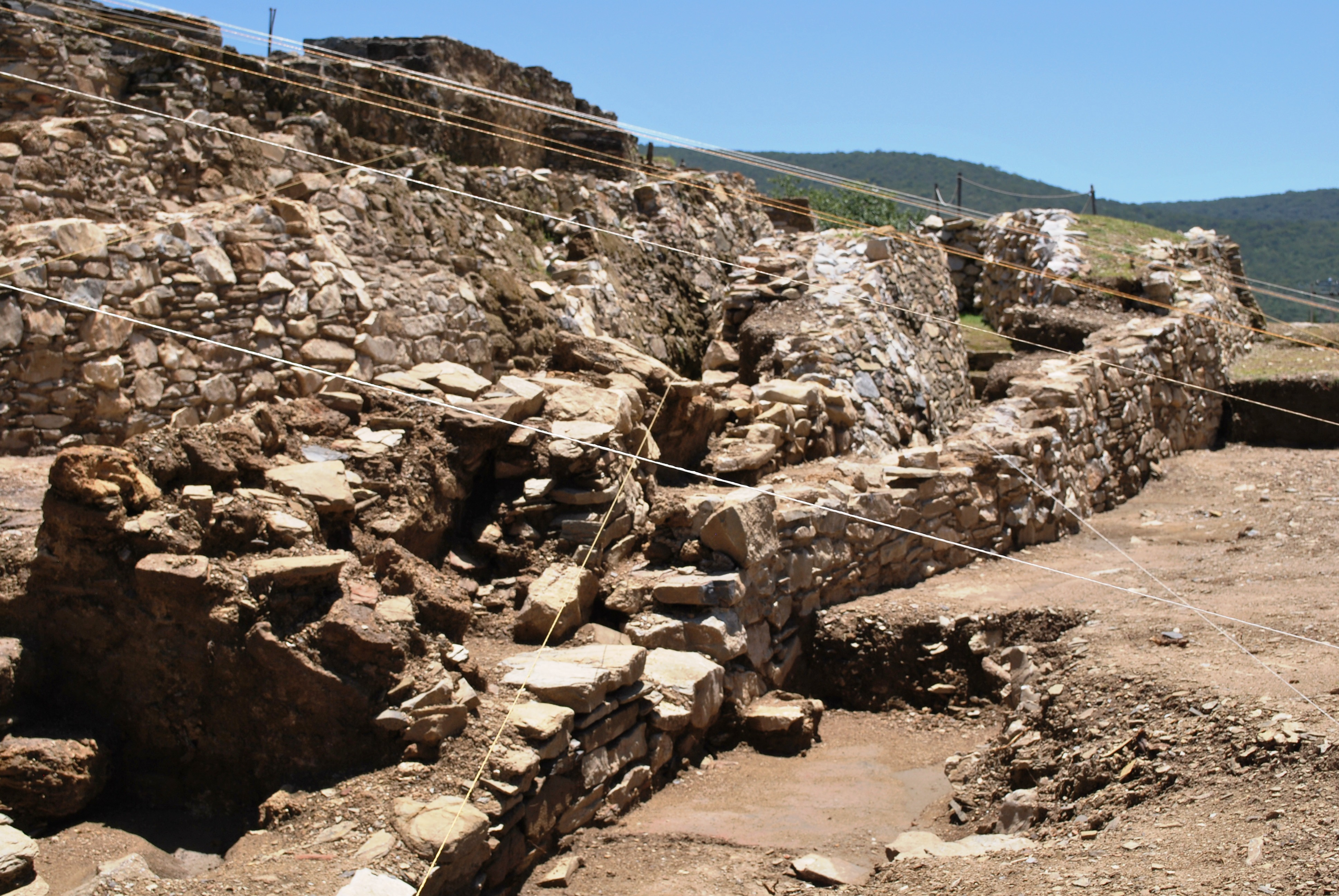
- Part of the Ixcateopan archeological site
- Interactive map of Ixcateopan
- Periods: Mesoamerican Classic, Postclassic
- Cultures: Cohuixcas - Chontal – Mexica
- Location: Ixcateopan de Cuauhtémoc, Guerrero, Mexico

History
- Built: 350 CE
- Abandoned: 1521 CE

Site notes
- Website: Ixcateopan zona arqueológica

Ixcateopan is an archaeological site located in the town and municipality of Ixcateopan de Cuauhtémoc, 36 kilometers from Taxco, in the isolated and rugged mountains of the northern part of the Mexican state of Guerrero.

The explored archeological remains are part of a city which functioned as an important regional ceremonial center. Ixcateopan was a place of cult and army garrisons inhabited by various native groups, such as the Cohuixcas (people of the place where there are lizards), the Chontales (foreigners) and by the Aztecs, at the time when the latter were at war with the Purépecha.

The city is known as the final resting place of Cuauhtémoc, the last Aztec Tlatoani, whose remains were found under the parish church here in the mid-20th century. This church has been converted into a museum with displays a number of pre-Hispanic artifacts, offerings left in honor of the emperor and the remains of Cuauhtémoc himself.

Only a portion of the "original" structures remain, as a result of a street construction and multiple sackings that have occurred by people seeking “carved” stones.

Only the civic-religious section can be seen, constituted by several rooms and open spaces, where remains of red stucco in the floors can be observed, the main structure is of circular shape and might have been dedicated to Quetzalcoatl. The chronological placing of the site is from 1350 to 1521 CE.

== Background ==
The first humans in the state's territory were nomadic hunter-gatherers who left evidence of their existence in various caves starting about 22,000 years ago. Up until about 8,000 years ago, climatic conditions better favored human habitation than those today; however, sedimentary human habitation happened around this time in the mountainous areas with more moisture, and better soil for agriculture. After that, settlements appeared near the coast because of fishing. At these sites, evidence of weaving, ceramics, basketry and other crafts have been found. Around this time, a grain called teocintle, or the forerunner to corn, became the staple of the diet.

The first settlers of the state were the Olmecs during the Mesoamerican Preclassical period, establishing themselves in the vicinity of the Balsas River, living in caves. The chichimecas inhabited the Tierra Caliente region.

There is debate as to whether the earliest civilizations here were Olmecs who migrated to this region or native peoples who were heavily influenced by the Olmecs, especially in the Mexcala River area. Olmec influences can be seen in cave paintings such as those found in Juxtlahuaca and well as stone tools and jade jewelry from the time period.

Eventually, the peoples of the Mexcala River area developed their own distinctive culture, called Mezcala or Mexcala. It is characterized by its own sculpture and ceramics, distinguished by its simplicity. Olmec influence remained with this culture, especially evident in the grouping of villages, construction of ceremonial centers and a government dominated by priests. Later, the culture assimilated aspects of the Teotihuacan model, which included the Mesoamerican ball game.

Later migrations to the area brought ethnicities such as the Purépecha, the Mixtecs, the Maya and the Zapotecs who left traces on the local cultures as they established commercial centers around the 7th century. In the 8th century, Toltec influence was felt as they traveled the many trade routes through here in search of tropical bird plumage and amate paper. From the 12th century to the 15th, the various peoples of the state were influenced by the Chichimecas, culminating in Aztec domination by the 15th century.

In the 11th century, new migrations entered the area from the north, which included the Nahuas, who occupied what is now the center of the state and the Purépecha who took over the west. The Nahuas established themselves in Zacatula, Atoyac and Tlacotepec, later conquering the areas occupied by the Chontals and Matlatzincas.

By the 15th century, the territory of the modern-day state of Guerrero was inhabited by a number of peoples, none of whom had major cities or population centers. The most important of these peoples were the Purépecha, Cuitlatecs, Ocuiltecas and Matlatzincas in the Tierra Caliente, the Chontales, Mazatecos (not to be confused with the Mazatec of Oaxaca) and Tlahuicas in the Sierra del Norte, the Coixcas and Tepoztecos in the Central Valleys, the Tlapanecos and Mixtecs in the La Montaña, the Yopis, Mixtecos and Amuzgos in Costa Chica and Tolimecas, Chumbias, Pantecas and Cuitlatecos in Costa Grande. Most of these lived in smaller dominions with moderate social stratification. One distinctive feature of the peoples of this was the use of cotton garments.

The Aztecs began making incursions in the Guerrero area as early as 1414 under Chimalpopoca as part of the conquest of the Toluca Valley. Incursions into the Tierra Caliente came around 1433 under Itzcoatl who attacked the Cuitlatecos settled between the Teloloapan and Cocula Rivers. By 1440, the Aztec Empire controlled the north of the state, or the mountainous areas. Attempts to take the Costa Chica area began in 1452 against the Yopis, which failed. Various battles would be fought between 1452 and 1511 before most of the rest of the state became Aztec tributary provinces. The modern state of Guerrero the comprised seven Aztec provinces.

Some of the inhabitants of this area before the Conquest were the Cohuixcas and the Chontals. The native community located at what is now the southern edge of the town dates back to at least 350 CE. This community was an important regional ceremonial center as well as the headquarters for the guardian soldiers. It was also closely associated with the production of cotton and cotton products, a valuable commodity at the time. Ixcateopan was one of the last cities to be subjugated by the Aztec Empire. The location served as a point to gather and then distribute tribute from surrounding areas. Mexica from other parts of the Aztec Empire, including soldiers, came here due to the wars between them and the Purépecha Empire. Because of this, Ixcateopan, originally a purely Chontal city, became multicultural.

=== Tlatoani Cuauhtémoc ===
Cuauhtémoc, the last Aztec Tlatoani (emperor), was born here in 1501. His mother, Cuayauhtitali, was the daughter of the Ixcateopan lord. Shortly before Cuauhtémoc was born, Ixcateopan was subjugated by the Aztecs and Cuayauhtitli was captured and brought to Tenochtitlan. There she met prince Ahuizotl, who married her. Cuauhtémoc was born of this union. Cuauhtémoc was educated in Tenochtitlan and then sent back to Ixcateopan. In 1519, he was ordered back to the Aztec capital to help defend it against the Spanish. After the deaths of Emperors Moctezuma II and, a short time later, Cuitláhuac, Cuauhtémoc became emperor, but was a captive of Hernán Cortés when Tenochtitlan fell in 1521. After enduring much torture, he and nine other Aztec lords were hung near a place called Izancánac in what is now the state of Chiapas. The remains of Cuauhtémoc, the other Aztec lords and a priest who opposed their execution were brought to Ixcateopan and buried here. From that time to the mid-20th century, the whereabouts of his tomb remained unknown.

Fray Torbio de Benavente, the local evangelist, and Fray Bernardino de Sahagún wrote texts about the death and burial of Cuauhtémoc which were initially kept at the Church of San Hipólito in Mexico City but somehow wound up in the hands of the family of Salvador Rodriguez Juárez, who was the doctor of Ixcateopan in the first half of the 20th century. The documents had been passed down in his family for generations. They told of how Cuauhtémoc's body had been recovered and brought to Ixcateopan and initially buried at the palace of his maternal grandparents in 1525. In 1529, Fray Toribio de Benavente had the body moved to a spot in front of the destroyed pagan temple, where the Church of Santa Maria de la Asunción would be built over it. The documents indicated that this tomb was nearly directly under the main altar of the church. After Rodríguez Juárez showed the documents to elders at the parish church, the Instituto Nacional de Antropología e Historia (INAH) was contacted, which sent archeologist Eulalia Guzmán to investigate the authenticity of the documents. After examining the documents, investigating the oral traditions of the area and other archeological and historical evidence, it was decided to excavate in the place where the documents indicated.

=== Toponymy ===
The word Ixcateopan is of Nahuatl origin, from íxcatl or íchcatl, "Cotton", and teopan, teopancalli or teopantli, "temple", hence "cotton temple".

Ixcateopan (sometimes spelled Ichcateopan) from the Nahuatl words “ichcacates” (or “ixcatle”) and “moteopan,” “teopan,” or “teopancalli.” Most interpret the first word as meaning cotton and the second temple, leading to a translation of temple of cotton. However, some sources claim the real name of the area is Zompancuahuithli, and the name was changed to Ixcateopan after the arrival of Cuauhtemoc's body and means (here is the temple/church). The glyph in the Mendoncino Codex for Ixcateopan reflects both interpretations, a cotton flower, a depiction of Cuauhtémoc and a pyramid. “De Cuauhtémoc” was added to Ixcateopan's name by the Congress of the State of Guerrero in 1950.

However, according to the Mexico Municipalities Encyclopedia, Ixcateopan is a Nahuatl derived word, from the words Ichacates and Moteopan, which mean: "here is your Lord of great respect" according to this version, the ancient name of the municipality was Zompancuahuithli, other authors attribute the meaning to "here is the Church" and others "Temple of cotton".

Hieroglyphs in the Codex Mendoza represents two elements; a cotton flower called Ixcatl in Nahuatl placed on the steps of a pyramid representing a temple (in Nahuatl teopantli), the translated symbols of means: "in the Temple of cotton".

As noted above, there were three main groups occupying the area, at one time or another, these were the Cohuixcas, Chontales and Aztecs.

=== Cohuixcas ===
Towards 1100 CE, the Nahua-Cohuixcas and Purépecha arrived in the area; the Cohuixcas settled the central region of the State of Guerrero, founding the towns of: Taxco, Iguala, Tepecoacuilco, Huitzuco, Tlaxmalac, Cocula, Teloloapan, Atenango, Tlamacazapa, Ixcateopan, Acapetlahuaya, Zumpango del Rio, Tlapa, Tixtla, Acapulco and Chilapa. The Purépecha groups founded Pungarabato, Coyuca Zirándaro and took over throughout the Tierra Caliente region.

They are referred to as Nahua-Cohuixcas, possibly because they spoke Nahuatl.

The Nahua name is given to different ethnic groups who have Nahuatl or Mexican as a common language. Nahuatl means "something that sounds good, such as bell" and also "cunning or crafty man" (Ladino). The most important ethnic group in the state of Guerrero was the Cohuixcas, who settled the central and northern regions. They came from northern territories. Coahuixca means "plain of snakes".

The Cohuixcas were the oldest inhabitants of this region, within the Atenango del Rio municipality, upon the Spaniards' arrival, they were tributaries of the Aztecs, who through their expeditions had come to dominate this region. The Chontales, Cohuixcas and other small fractions of peoples who spoke various languages, scattered from Guerrero to Oaxaca, nothing is known; modern people judges them from remains of tribes that preceded the Nations that left history traces.

This opinion is not so risky; Humboldt in the past, had tried the same judgment, while incurring certain errors. «The Nations that successively invaded Mexico, he noted, the Toltec, the chichimecas, the nahuatlaques, the Acolhuas, the Tlaxcaltecas and the Aztecs, formed a single group, almost like the Germans, the Norwegians, Goths and Danes, mixed into a single race; the Germanic peoples.» It is likely, that other Nations such as the Otomi, Olmecs, Cuitlateques, Zacatecos and Purépecha, have appeared in the region before the Toltec. Wherever people have progressed in the same direction, the place they geographically occupy somehow designates the chronological order of their migrations. By the same rule can place the Nations who spoke lost languages.

The last external offensive from forces loyal to the Aztecs came from the Malinalcas, Matlatzincas and Cohuixcas. The Spaniards Andrés de Tapia and Gonzalo de Sandoval stopped their advance.

=== Chontales ===
The Chontal of Guerrero were a scarcely-documented ethnic group native to the northern portion of the state of Guerrero. The word Chontal means 'foreigner' in Nahuatl, and was applied as a label to many unrelated groups, whose only common facet was speaking a language other than Nahuatl. Thus, the Chontal of Guerrero should not be confused with the Chontal of Oaxaca, nor the Chontal Maya. The Chontal language of Guerrero is undocumented and unclassified, although there is speculation that it may have been related to the nearby Tuxtec language. Nahuatl became widespread as a lingua franca in the Chontal region, which meant that colonial missionaries were not compelled to learn the Chontal language.

== The Site ==
The archaeological site remains so far explored comprise a section that possibly functioned as an important ceremonial center at regional level. Ixcateopan was placed of cult and war goods storage inhabited by various native populations, such as Cohuixcas “people from the place with small lizards”, the chontales “foreigners” and by mexicas, at the time when they were at war with the purépecha. The buildings correspond to at least five different constructive periods; the complex was dedicated to religious ceremonies, administrative activities and trade.

After some Mexica military raids to areas near the Balsas River, under the command of Itzcóatl fourth Mexica Tlatoani (from náhuatl tlahtoāni “the speaker”), the military success over the northern part of modern-day Guerrero was formalized during the ruling of Moctezuma Ilhuicamina, fifth Mexica “huey tlatoani” from 1440 to 1469, during which period the people of Oztuma, Ixcateopan, Taxco, Tlaxmalac and Cuetzala were conquered. Therefore, Ixcateopan became a tributary province of Tepecoacuilco.

The above was intimately associated with storage activities and clothing manufacturing from cotton, raw material that had to be the main source of supply and cult in the region. The archaeological zone is formed by a series of over laid structures built on the natural land elevation, it occupies approximately 5 thousand square meters. For construction they used local materials like: stone slabs, limestone and marble; for finishing, stucco and red paint was used.

Finding of ancient instruments in the Ixcateopan archeological site corroborates that this place was subjugated by the Mexica military power.

Ixcateopan was one of the last places conquered and dominated by the Mexica military power, becoming towards the end of the 15th and early 16th century, a tributary of the Triple Alliance; tools found at this archaeological site corroborate that this prehispanic site spun cotton for Tenochtitlan, which was used to make soldiers suits.

In several site excavations ancient instruments were found, mainly spindle whorls apparatus (malacates), in the remains of some rooms.

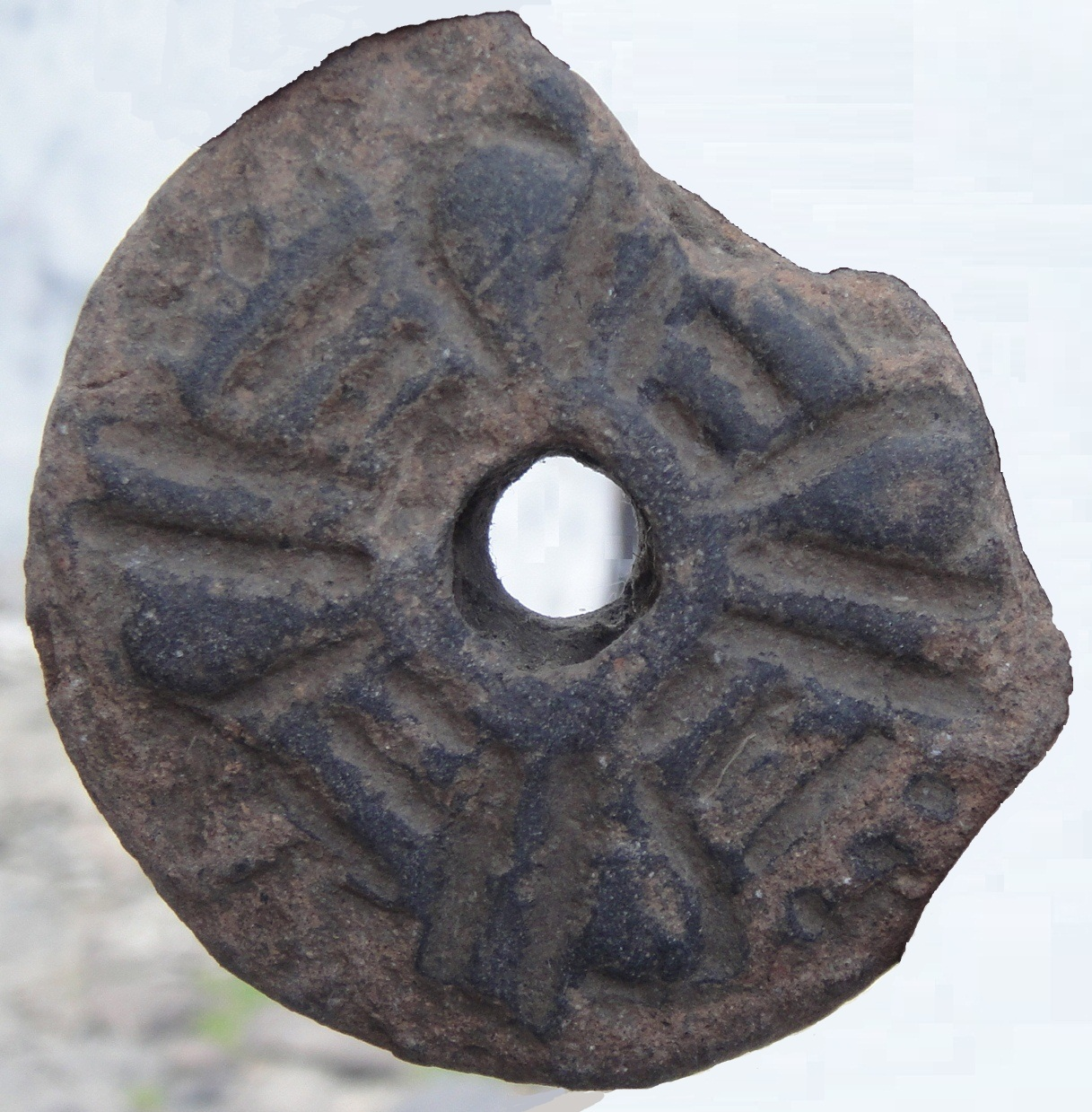
Ceramic Malacate

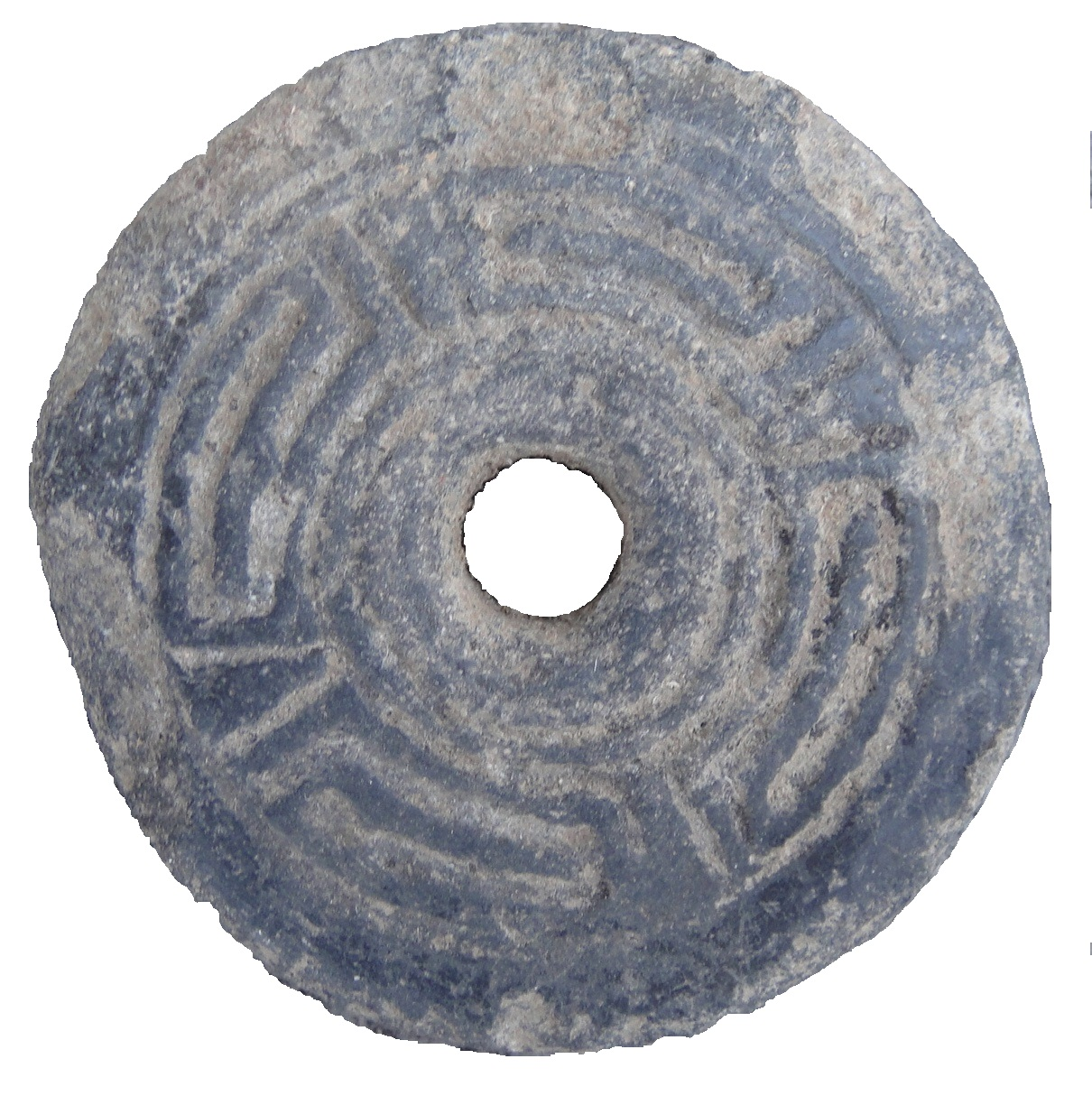
Ceramic Malacate

=== Malacates ===
The Malacates or disks with a central hole, sometimes referred to as “Rodelas” (washers), are complex to analyze. On the one hand, they have often been associated with spindle whorls, although there is little ethnographic documentation to support it was their main function. On the other hand, sometimes it is considered that these could have been beads or hanging decoration. It is difficult to consider other features for these curious samples.

The other functional possibility, that considered them as beads or hanging decoration, is somewhat complex to analyze, considering these are disks with perforated center holes and not precisely on its edges, as they could easily hung as necklace beads and pendant disks. In fact, the rodelas could have functioned as necklace beads, on a necklace that used on edge rather than front position. In other words, is a peculiar ornament, but not impossible to do.

The Malacates are all artifacts of primary class ceramic artifacts. Decoration on its upper side, many of them are flat on the bottom section, but the shape -all are circular- is variable in their section. In the past, (in Chiapas), it was mentioned that some Malacates were tapered, flat and mixed existed. Its most definite function, more than any of the remaining ceramic artifacts, always considered as spindle whorls. However, as a secondary or alternate function could also serve as necklace beads.

The finding of malacates, plus the Nahuatl site denomination, “Cotton Temple”, implies that Ixcateopan provided large amounts of this plant, already manufactured, to the towns of Tenochtitlan, Texcoco and Tlacopan.

It is considered that Ixcateopan spun cotton that was used to make suits of the mexicas soldiers. These data corroborate the narrow relation between Ixcateopan and the center of Mexico; local ceramics remains found here, are similar to those from the Valley of Mexico.

These aspects seem to point out that, since Ixcateopan did not have the topographic and strategic characteristics of sites located in the war belt, very possibly it formed part of the Mexica rear and was a storage place, for foods and war equipment.

Ixcateopan was a Chontal settlement, and even though neither their language nor physical features are known, archaeological y physical anthropologic studies shall determine the various aspects of this cultural group, unknown to date. However, this prehispanic site had a multi-cultural configuration.

In the north of the state of Guerrero, Ixcateopan represents the only late postclassical period (1200–1521 AD.) site that has been extensively explored.

Excavations from the first field season at this archaeological site, conducted in 2008, provided detection of at least three constructive stages, from 1450 to 1521 AD. This is known from ceramic remains of the denominated type Aztec III, other locally manufactured as an imitation of the previous, fragments of the type called “Rojo Texcoco”, from Cholula and, in addition, two local types colored dark red over beige and “Yestla”-Orange.

This unique village could well be named "the marble town", because its narrow streets are paved with this noble material, which magnificently beautifies the physiognomy of the town, due to the borrow sites surrounding the town.

=== Structures ===
Ixcateopan covers an extension of about one hectare and a half, and it is within the city of the same name, where circular altars are distributed and stairways, finished in a dice shape.

East and west sections of the site have been explored, which was built on a natural slope. In the first area vestiges of a 56 meters long wall was found, part of a platform; and in the second area (west) a series of terraces were found.

The top of this slope was arranged by means of artificial terraces, which facilitated the construction of a large platform on which the ceremonial center was built, as well as plazas, walkways, stairways, living quarters and storage.

The constructions, from the postclassical period, were built between 1350 and 1450 CE.

The buildings are at least from five different constructive periods; the complex was dedicated to religious ceremonies, administrative and trade activities.

Esto a su vez, está íntimamente asociado an actividades de almacenamiento y elaboración de productos derivados del algodón, materia prima que debió ser la principal fuente de abasto y de culto en la región.

The archaeological zone consists of a series of overlays built on a natural elevation of the terrain, which occupies approximately 5 thousand square meters. Construction materials employed include: stone slabs, marble, limestone, boulders; and stucco and red paint used for finishing.

=== Ceramic ===
Ceramic artifacts are a large and important group of samples found, generally mentioned in archaeological reports, serve to describe as well as chronological placement of sites, although seldom are investigation and study specific subjects

The typical ceramics used at that time was made of three legged hollow “Boxes” (cajetes), and with a streamlined serpent shape, or metlapilcoate. “Cajetes” were painted brown over beige, and there were other decoration painted color brown, black and polychrome beige.

=== Gods ===
The 16th century geographic relations written by Lucas Pinto state that in "Ichcateopan", people adored two main Gods, a man and a woman, called "Iztac Tlamacazqui" (white priest) and Acxoyatl Cihuatl (the fir tree woman). Two main priests were in charge of the cult and the sacrifice of virgin women. The population made penances and self-sacrifices; they stuck their tongue and ears with thorns, removed blood and ignited copal. The white priest seemed to represent cotton, part Ixcateopan glyph of the place name.

== Other sites in Guerrero ==
The zone has older Olmec settlements from the mid preclassical (1200 – 400 BC.) period such as Teopantecuanitlán and Oxtotitlán, as well as from the classical and postclassical (200 BC. - 1521 AD.), during which period it had a cultural mosaic, and people talked in various languages; tlapanec, mixteco, Nahuatl, Matlatzinca, purépecha, etc.

- Cerro de Huashocote.
- Tlaxmalac.
- Barrio Cantón.
- La Maroma.
- Teopantecuanitlán, in Copalillo.
- La Organera.
- Huamuxtitlán.
- Los Tepoltzis.
- La Sabana.
- Palma Sola.
- Pezuapan.
- La Soledad de Maciel.
- Oxtotitlán.
- Tehuacalco.

== Bibliography ==
- A description of the Codex
- "Review of The Essential Codex Mendoza". Canadian Journal of History. August 2000. Archived from the original on May 18, 2007 – via FindArticles.
- Campos Ochoa, Moisés, MÉXICO, 1968. Historia del Estado de Guerrero, Época Prehispánica [History of the State of Guerrero, prehispanic period] Vol. I, INAH Gobierno del Estado de Guerrero, Editorial Porrúa, 1998. (in Spanish)
- Campbell, Lyle and David Oltrogge, 1980, Proto-Tol (Jicaque), International Journal of American Linguistics, 46:205-223
- Campbell, Lyle. (1979). Middle American languages. In L. Campbell & M. Mithun (Eds.), The languages of native America: Historical and comparative assessment (pp. 902–1000). Austin: University of Texas Press.
- Campbell, Lyle (1997) American Indian Languages, The Historical Linguistics of Native America, Oxford Studies in Anthropological Linguistics, Oxford University Press
- Keller, Kathryn C. and Plácido Luciano G., compilers. 1997. Diccionario Chontal de Tabasco.
