= Ixcateopan de Cuauhtémoc =

Town in the Mexican state of Guerrero

Ixcateopan, Guerrero
- Town
- Ixcateopan de Cuauhtémoc
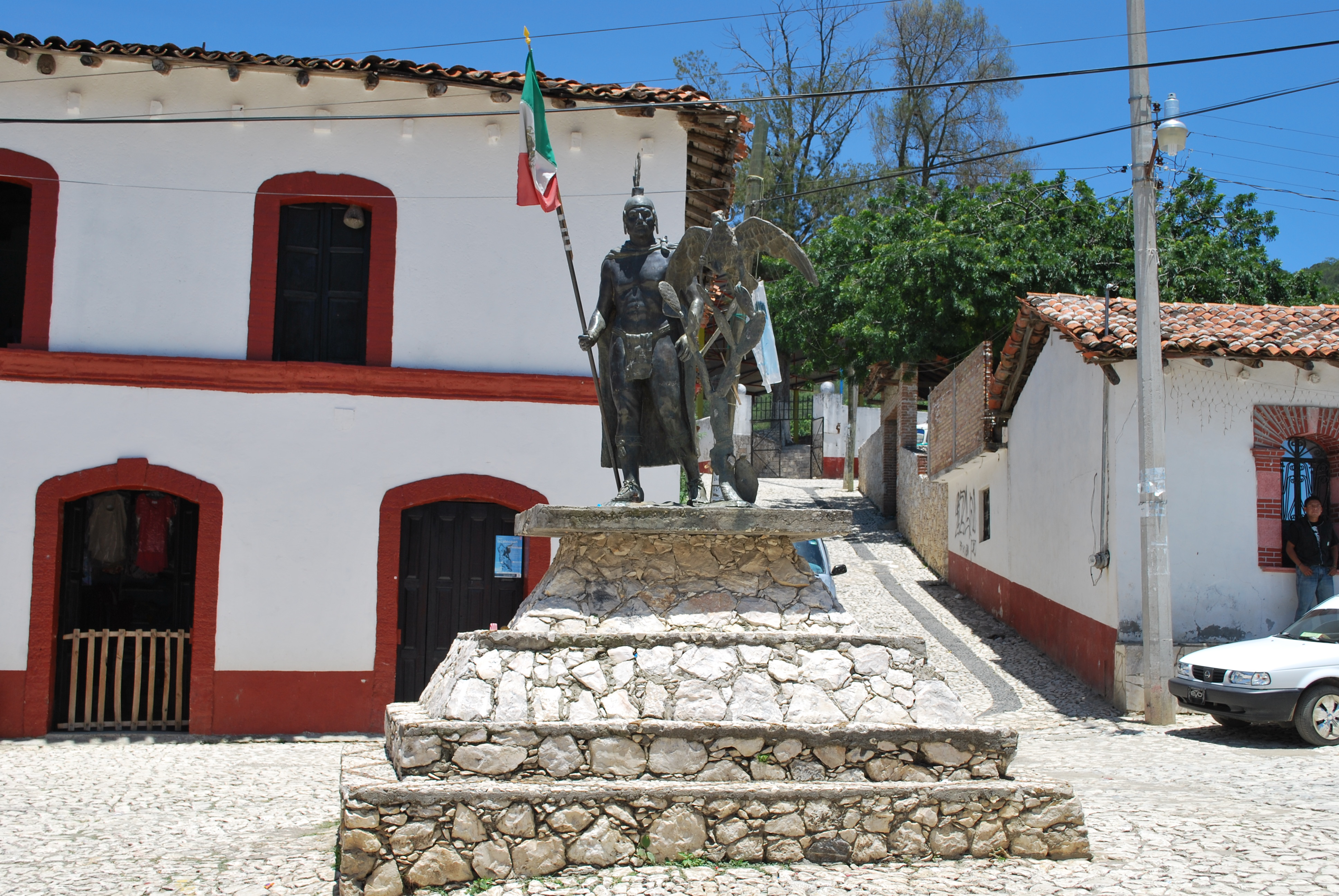
- Monument to Cuauhtémoc in a plaza in the town

- Location in Mexico Ixcateopan, Guerrero (Mexico)
- Coordinates: 18°30′00″N 99°47′36″W
- Country: Mexico
- State: Guerrero
- Founded: 350
- Municipal Status: 1850

Government
  - Municipal President: Dario Perez Morales (2007–2010)

Area
  - Total: 310.7 km^{2} (120.0 sq mi)
- Elevation (of seat): 2,600 m (8,500 ft)

Population (2005) Municipality
  - Total: 6,104
  - Seat: 2,379
- Time zone: UTC-6 (Zona Centro)
- Postal code (of seat): 40430

Ixcateopan de Cuauhtémoc is the head town of the municipality of Ixcateopan de Cuauhtémoc, located in isolated, rugged mountains in the northern part of the Mexican state of Guerrero. According to tradition, it is the final resting place of Aztec Emperor Cuauhtémoc, whose alleged remains were found under the parish church here in the mid-20th century. This church has been converted into a museum with displays a number of pre-Hispanic artifacts, offerings left in honor of the emperor and the alleged remains of Cuauhtémoc himself. This has been refuted by later research and by a Judging Commission of the Mexican government in 1976.

Ixcateopan de Cuauhtémoc is located 36 km west of famous silver town of Taxco de Alarcón, traveling on the state highway. Unlike its neighbor, the vegetation surrounding Ixcateopan is forested with pine, red and white cedar, and walnut trees. Along the highway, there is a waterfall by the name of Cascada de Cacalotenango, which has a small chapel at the top. The distance between Ixcateopan and Chilpancingo, the capital of the state of Guerrero, is 180 km.

The explored archeological remains are located at the Ixcateopan (archaeological site).

The name Ixcateopan (sometimes spelled Ichcateopan) from the Nahuatl words “ichcacates” (or “ixcatle”) and “moteopan,” “teopan,” or “teopancalli.” Most interpret the first word as meaning cotton and the second temple, leading to a translation of temple of cotton. However, some sources claim the real name of the area is Zompancuahuithli, and the name was changed to Ixcateopan after the arrival of Cuauhtemoc's body and means (here is the temple/church). The glyph in the Mendoncino Codex for Ixcateopan reflects both interpretations, a cotton flower, a depiction of Cuauhtémoc and a pyramid. “De Cuauhtémoc” was added to Ixcateopan’s name by the Congress of the State of Guerrero in 1950.

In 2023, Ixcateopan de Cuauhtémoc was designated a Pueblo Mágico by the Mexican government, recognizing its cultural and historical importance.

== History ==
Some of the inhabitants of this area before the Conquest were the Coixcas and the Chontals. The indigenous community located at what is now the southern edge of the town dates back to at least 350 C. E. This community was an important regional ceremonial center as well as the headquarters for the guardian soldiers. It was also closely associated with the production of cotton and cotton products, a valuable commodity at the time. Ixcateopan was one of the last cities to be subjugated by the Aztec Empire. The location served as a point to gather and then distribute tribute from surrounding areas. Mexica from other parts of the Aztec Empire, including soldiers, came here due to the wars between them and the Purépecha Empire. Because of this, Ixcateopan, originally a purely Chontal city, became multicultural.

Fray Torbio de Benavente, the local evangelist, and Fray Bernardino de Sahagún wrote texts about the death and burial of Cuauhtémoc which were initially kept at the Church of San Hipólito in Mexico City but somehow wound up in the hands of the family of Salvador Rodriguez Juárez, who was the doctor of Ixcateopan in the first half of the 20th century. The documents had been passed down in his family for generations. They told of how Cuauhtémoc’s body had been recovered and brought to Ixcateopan and initially buried at the palace of his maternal grandparents in 1525. In 1529, Fray Toribio de Benavente had the body moved to a spot in front of the destroyed pagan temple, where the Church of Santa María de la Asunción would be built over him. The documents indicated that this tomb was nearly directly under the main altar of the church. After Rodríguez Juárez showed the documents to elders at the parish church, the Instituto Nacional de Antropología e Historia (INAH) was contacted, which sent archeologist Eulalia Guzmán to investigate the authenticity of the documents. After examining the documents, investigating the oral traditions of the area and other archeological and historical evidence, it was decided to excavate in the place where the documents indicated.

The authenticity of the find was challenged, so the INAH sent other teams to investigate the find. Results of the corroborative efforts were mixed with researchers casting doubt on the age of the bones found, the documents that led to their discovery and the authenticity of the artifacts found at the site. In 1976, a Judging Commission determined:

First. That the skeletal remains belong to eight individuals and come from different epochs and different forms of burial. Second. That the young adult mestizo whose remains face and teeth are part of Ichcateopan finding could not have been buried in 1529 [the year of the death of Cuauhtemoc] (...) Fourth. That oral tradition does not start until the 16th century and in its current form is known only since 1949. Fifth. That all documents-both those that gave rise to the finding as presented later-are apocryphal and were developed after 1917 (...) There is no scientific basis for claiming that the remains found on September 26, 1949 in the church of St. Mary of the Assumption, Ichacateopan, Guerrero, are the remains of Cuauhtemoc, the last lord of the Mexica and heroic defender of Mexico-Tenochtitlan

— Informe de la Comisión de 1976

Recent investigations determined that the remains are judged not to be of Cuauhtémoc, but instead corresponding to eight different bodies and the skull is female. Early research reports by Eulalia Guzmán, distorted the facts. Today the burial is considered a forgery by archeologists, although many locals and cultural activists still consider it to be genuine.

== The town ==
The town of Ixcateopan has about 2,400 residents, which is over a third of the municipality’s inhabitants. One thing that stands out about this town is that streets are paved in unpolished white marble and many of the walls around properties contain it as well. The town of Ixcateopan has similar colonial architecture as the larger Taxco: white houses topped with peaked roofs with red clay tile roofs. However, they are not as well-maintained as those in Taxco. Because of the discovery of Cuauhtémoc’s tomb here, Ixcateopan has become a place of national interest. Flags fly here at half mast on 28 February, the anniversary of Cuauhtémoc’s death. Because of the discovery of the tomb of Cuauhtemoc and the continued discoveries at the archeological site on the southern edge of town, Ixcateopan draws archeologists, anthropologist and historians.

=== Museum of Santa María de la Asunción ===
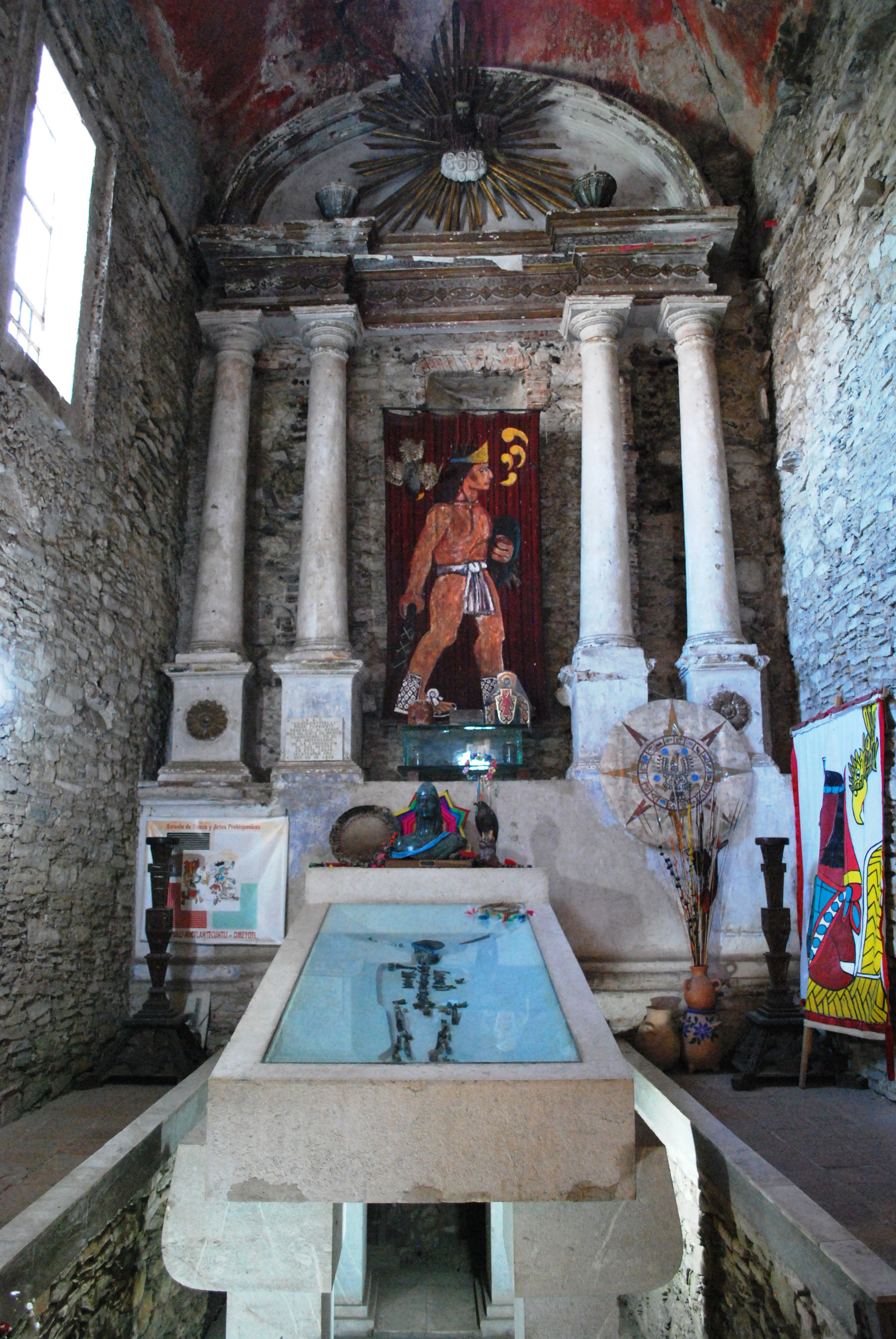
Shrine to Cuauhtémoc in the museum

The Museum of Santa María de la Asunción, located just south of the main plaza in the center of town, was the parish church for the community from the 16th century until the mid-20th, when it was declared a national monument. Since the discovery of the alleged Cuauhtémoc's tomb under the main altar, this building and its grounds have been converted from a religious sanctuary to a civil one. Most, but not all, of its Christian iconography has been taken out. Where the main altar used to be is now a shrine to the last Aztec emperor, with his false remains on public display. A small museum occupies the former church’s annex. Jairo Rodríguez, son of the doctor who made the documents about Cuauhtemoc's burial public knowledge, is the official chronicler of Ixcateopan and the guardian of the museum.

=== Annual ceremony in honor of Cuauhtémoc ===
Cuauhtemoc has become a symbol of Mexican cultural identity and for many dancers who come here to celebrate, a symbol of their modern identity. Cuauhtémoc has become a symbol of ethnocultural identity, nationalism and resistance, and this place brings indigenous people from all over Mexico and other nations in the Americas. The end of February is important as Cuauhtémoc’s birthday (23 February) and death (28 February) are commemorated here. His day of birth draws the most dance groups who come from all over Mexico, the U.S., Canada and South America, to lay offerings, dance and sing in many different languages. Preparations at the church/museum and the rest of the town occupy the days and nights before the 23rd. For several days straddling the birthday itself, dances and ceremonies continue almost non-stop, accompanies by huehuetls (Aztec drums), and wind instruments made of animal horns and large conch shells and accompanied by copal incense.

=== Archeological zone ===
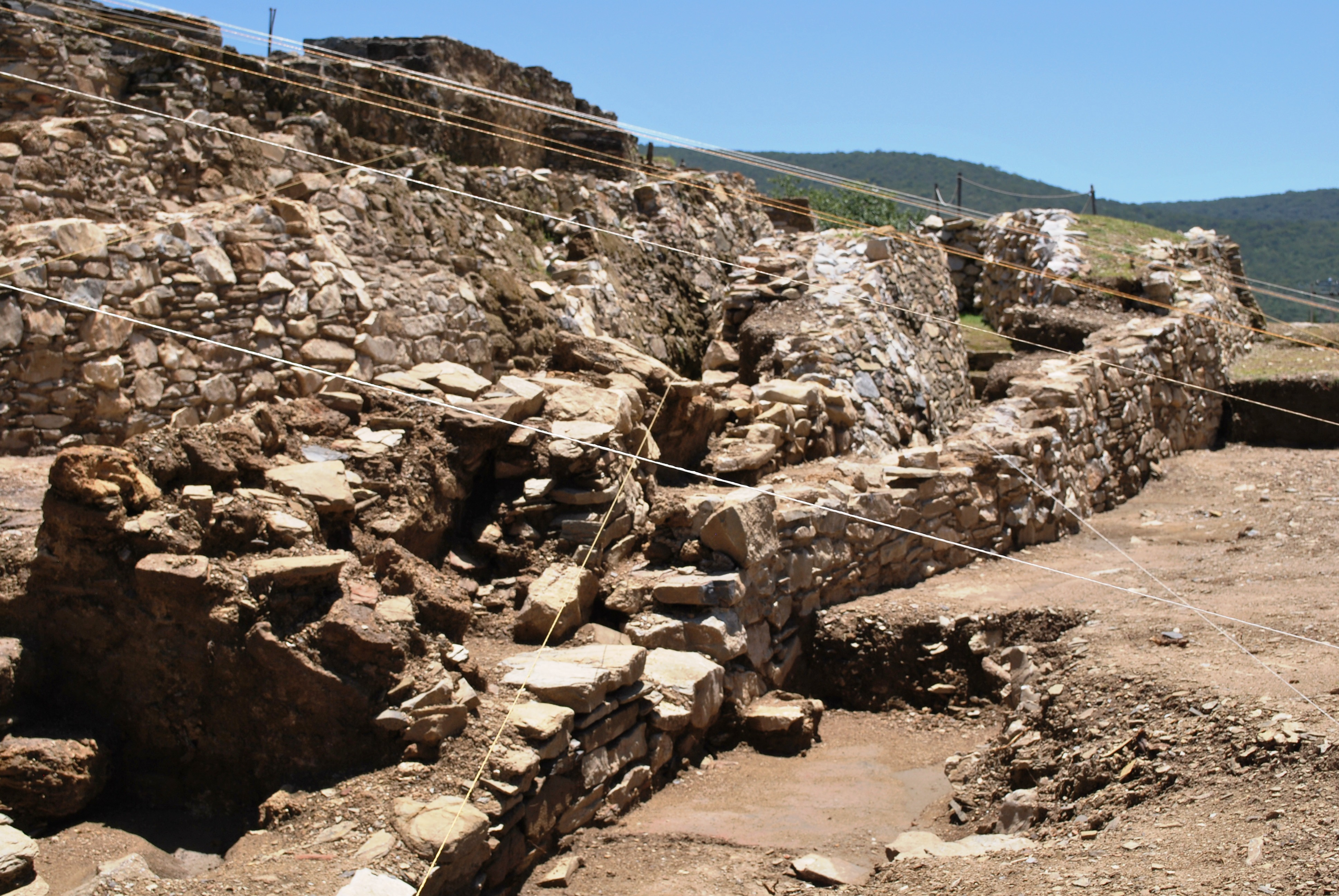
Part of the archeological site

South of the Santa María de la Asunción Museum on Vicente Guerrero Street is the archeological zone of Ixcateopan. The site has been dated from between 350 and 1450 C. E. with at least five construction stages, three of which are dated from between 1350 and 1450 C.E. Although construction seemed to have ceased after 1450, it is known that the site was occupied up until the Spanish arrival in 1521. The archeological zone is formed by a series of constructions over a natural elevation and occupied about 5,000 m2/square meters (approximately 1.24 acres). Local materials were used in its construction: flagstone, limestone, marble and smooth pebble which were covered in stucco and painted. This excavated complex was dedicated to religious ceremonies, administrative activities and the local hierarchy’s relations with the rest of the world. Religiously, it was of regional importance.

Ixcateopan was a Chontal settlement that was conquered by the Aztecs, by Moctezuma I and Ahuitzotl. The Chontales are a little-known group with most information about them coming from documents written in 1579, but nothing of their language is known as no human remains from their burials have been found. stages The site has provided much information about the development of what is now the north of Guerrero state in the late pre-Hispanic period, when it was populated by groups such as the Matlatzincas, Tepoztecos, and Nahuas as well as Chontales.

The site was first excavated in 1976 by archeologist Juan Yaveún, with subsequent studies by Guadalupe Martínez, Alajandro Pastrana, José Hernández Rivera and Elizabeth Jiménez. However, excavations in the mid 2000s have uncovered new finds at the site including a set of stairs that run from south to north on the main plaza, dwellings and storage facilities as well as workshops with ceramics showing Aztec and Cholulteca influence and purely local designs. With these, it is possible to reconstruct something of these people’s relations with these groups. Most of the excavations here have followed an east-west axis and about 3,000 m2 have been explored. Efforts have been made to have Ixcateopan and “archeological monuments zone” as well as obtain resources to continue excavations here.
