= Tepecoacuilco de Trujano =

City in the Mexican state of Guerrero

- Municipal seat and city
- Location within Guerrero Location within Mexico
- Coordinates: 18°18′N 99°29′W
- Country: Mexico
- State: Guerrero
- Municipality: Tepecoacuilco de Trujano
- Time zone: UTC-6 (Zona Centro)

Tepecoacuilco de Trujano is a city and seat of the municipality of Tepecoacuilco de Trujano, in the Mexican state of Guerrero.

== History ==
Before the Spanish conquest, this was the capital of an extensive Aztec tributary province which also included Iguala, Huitzuco, Teloloapan, Ixcateopan, Chilapa, Cuetzala, Cocula, Oztoma and Alahuixtlan. Tribute from this province consisted of cotton clothing, warrior costumes, grain, honey, jade, copal, gourds, and copper axes. Both Nahuatl and Chontal were spoken here, as well as Matlame (probably Matlatzinca) in smaller numbers. There was an Aztec garrison here.
