= Cocula =

Cocula may refer to several different places in Mexico:

- Cocula Municipality, Jalisco
  - Cocula, Jalisco, the municipal seat
- Cocula Municipality, Guerrero
  - Cocula, Guerrero, the municipal seat
