= Chontal people (Guerrero) =

Indigenous people of Mexico

The Chontal were a Mesoamerican ethnic group that inhabited the northern region of what is now the Mexican state of Guerrero. The name Chontal is a Nahuatl word meaning "foreigner", and was used by the Aztecs to refer to multiple unrelated ethnic groups. The Chontal had their own language, which is now extinct and was never documented. They are referred to in sources from the sixteenth and seventeenth centuries, but declined afterwards, and today are considered extinct as a culture and identity.

== Distribution ==
According to colonial records, the Chontal lived to the north of the Balsas River and to the west of the Coixca River, in the northern region of the state of Guerrero. In the 16th century, the primary Chontal settlements were Ixcateopan, Alahuistlan, Ostuma, Coatepec, Toltoltepec, Teloloapan, and Apastla. Other towns where Chontal people could be found included Iguala, Tepecoacuilco, Cocula, Chilacachapa, Acamixtla, Chontalcoatlán, Noxtepec, Tetipac, Tlamacazapa, and Zacualpan. A Chontal language was also mentioned at Pungarabato, now Ciudad Altamirano, but it is unclear if it referred to the same ethnicity.

== Culture ==
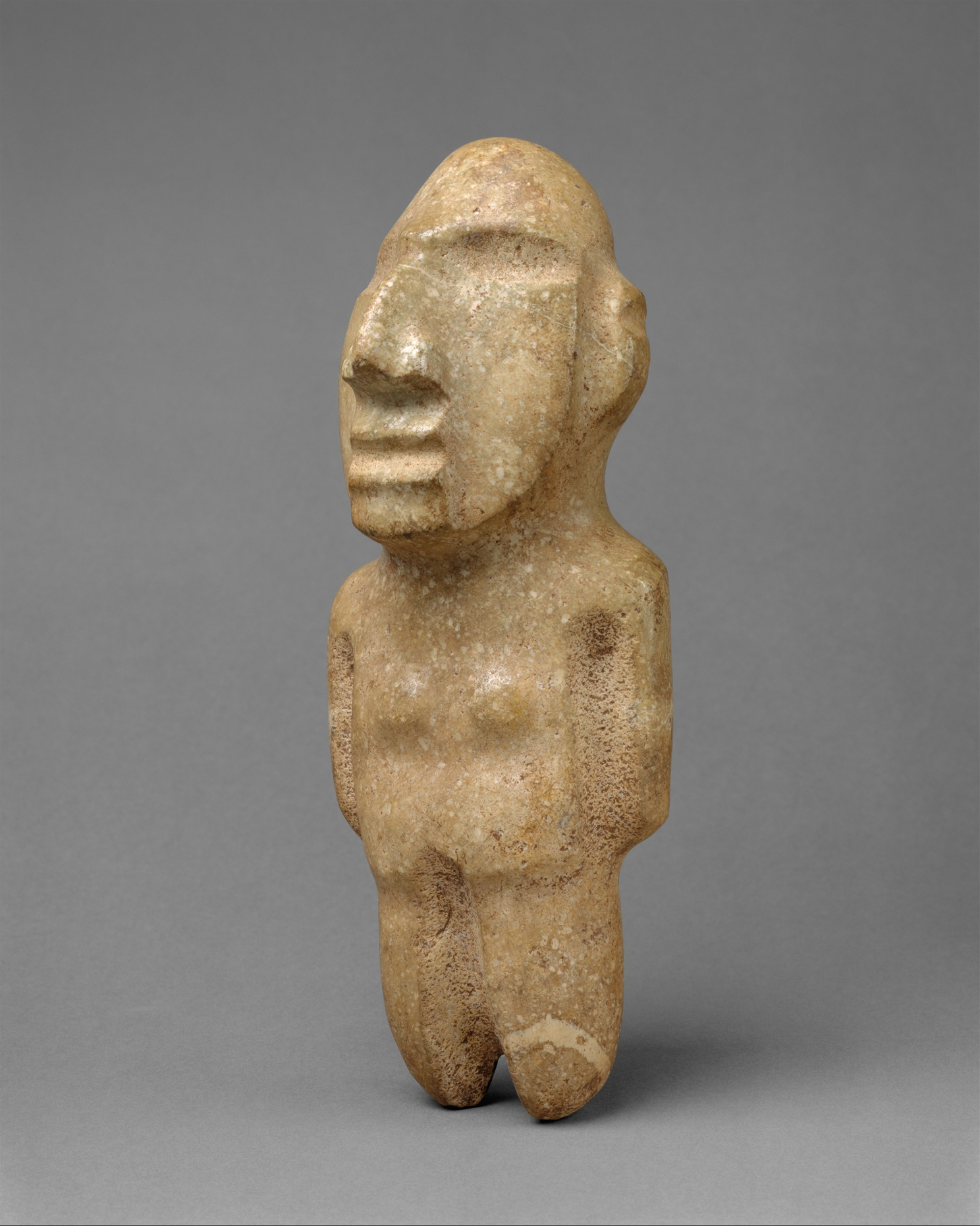
A prehispanic Chontal sculpture

The Chontal, much like other Mesoamerican societies, were an agricultural people divided into three classes of nobles, commoners (who paid tribute to the rulers and were only allowed to eat meat or drink alcohol on special occasions) and slaves (composed of thieves and prisoners of war). Rulership was hereditary, and in Oztuma and Ixcateopan the ruler (called Huehuetecutli in the latter town) had two important noble assistants. Both towns also had an office resembling a police officer in function, called ustlane in Oztuma and teposque in Ixcateopan. The ruler of Chilacachapa was called ozomatecutli and had fifteen wives. The ruler of Teloloapan was called tletecutli.

Typical clothing consisted of a cloth garment tied at the shoulder for men, and petticoats and huipils for women. Houses were low, made of stone or adobe with roofs of zacate and doors and fences of cane. Some houses had small granaries. Rulers' houses were situated higher. Teloloapan, Oztuma and Alahuistlan were large towns dominated by a main street, while in Ichcateopan houses were scattered among ravines. Around Acuitlapan, the people lived in caves and ravines. Alahuistlan had fertile land that yielded cacao, honey, cotton, chiles, and fruits, and the town was also one of the most significant sources of salt in the region.

Warriors used the bow and arrow, spears, shields, and cotton armor. The Chontal built fortifications, many of which were later adapted by the Aztecs in order to fortify the border with the Purepecha Empire. Temples were made of stone, had many steps and were guarded by "old ones". The people would make requests of these old ones, and they would then perform bloodletting rituals in front of an idol and offer it copal or cotton mantles. The dead were buried in a seated position with their possessions (including their slaves) and plenty of food. When a ruler was buried, a male and female slave were killed and buried with him. In Coatepec, if the deceased lacked relatives he was reportedly simply thrown into a field.

== History ==
By the late postclassic period, the Chontal country seems to have been progressively settled by Nahua groups, especially the Coixcas, apparently resulting in conflict. At the time of the Spanish conquest, the Chontal of Apaztla were at war with the neighboring Nahua of Cuezala, who had migrated to the area at some point in the past. The Chontal claimed that they had granted the Nahua land, only to be later conquered by the same. The Nahua in turn claimed that the Chontal had refused them land, so they first had lived in caves by hunting and obtaining corn from neighboring towns before eventually building houses of their own and adopting agriculture.

The entirety of Chontal territory was conquered by the Aztec Empire, seemingly under Moctezuma I. Oztuma, Teloloapan and Alahuistlan later revolted upon the coronation of Ahuitzotl, prompting a reconquest campaign which killed or captured 44,200 Chontal by Aztec estimations. Alternatively, the reconquest campaign may have been the result of a Purepecha invasion instead of a Chontal rebellion.

Their population on the eve of Spanish contact (c. 1520) has been estimated at roughly 75,000, representing 10% of the population of Guerrero at the time.
