= Ixcateopan de Cuauhtémoc (municipality) =

Municipality in the Mexican state of Guerrero

- Municipality
- Location within Mexico
- Coordinates: 18°25′N 99°46′W
- Country: Mexico
- State: Guerrero
- Municipal seat: Ixcateopan de Cuauhtémoc
- Time zone: UTC-6 (CST)
- Website: Ixcateopan (in Spanish)

Ixtcateopan de Cuauhtémoc is a municipality in the Mexican state of Guerrero. It is located in the parallel 18°25’ of north latitude and between the meridians 99°42’ and 99°51’ of west longitude. The distance between Ixcateopan and Chilpancingo, the capital of the state of Guerrero, is 180 km.

The seat is Ixcateopan de Cuauhtémoc.

Ixcateopan has a territorial extension of 310.7 square kilometers. According to the 2000 INEGI census Ixcateopan de Cuauhtémoc has a population of 2296.

The name “Ixcateopan” is composed by the word “ixcatl” which means cotton, and “teopantli” which means temple, and the complete name means “In the temple of cotton".

The main activities of the town are carpentry, farming and livestock raising. It claims to be the final resting place of Aztec huey tlatoani Cuauhtémoc, which is an elaborate hoax.

== The municipality ==
The municipality of Ixcateopan is part of the northern region of Guerrero state. It borders the municipalities of Taxco, Pedro Ascencio Alquisiras and Teloloapan. As much of its 310.7 km^{2} territory is on the Trans-Mexican Volcanic Belt, it consists of very rugged terrain. This has made the municipality and its seat relatively isolated, with the first major road reaching it in the 1940s. Higher elevations here are covered in pine and cedar (red and white) and include peaks such as the Texal Grande, Tecampanero, La Mesas and Ancón Mountains, which range between 1,830 and 2,150 meters above sea level. Only 15% of the municipality is flat land, and this is mostly small mesas scattered in the south and north east of the municipality. The municipality is in the Balsas River Basin but only streams such as the Atenanguillo, San Pedro Atengo, Salitre flow year-round. There is one major fresh-water spring at the municipal seat but the rest of the municipality depends on groundwater. The climate is warm and fairly moist, with average temperatures ranging between 18 and 22 C in the warmer months and between 17 and 22C in the colder ones. Most of the municipality's rain falls between June and September.

Unlike many other municipalities in Mexico, the population of Ixcateopan is falling. From 1960 to 2005, the population has fallen from over 8,000 to 6,100. Most of the population is scattered among 70 “localidades” of between 2 and 1000, with most between 70 and 200 people.

About 32% of the municipalities population is dedicated to agriculture of which the production of beans stand out, but livestock such as pigs, sheep, goats and horses are raised here as well. Another 38% is involved in mining and manufacturing with the primary commodities being marble and hand-crafted furniture.
