= Balsas River =

River in Mexico

Balsas River Mezcala River, Atoyac River
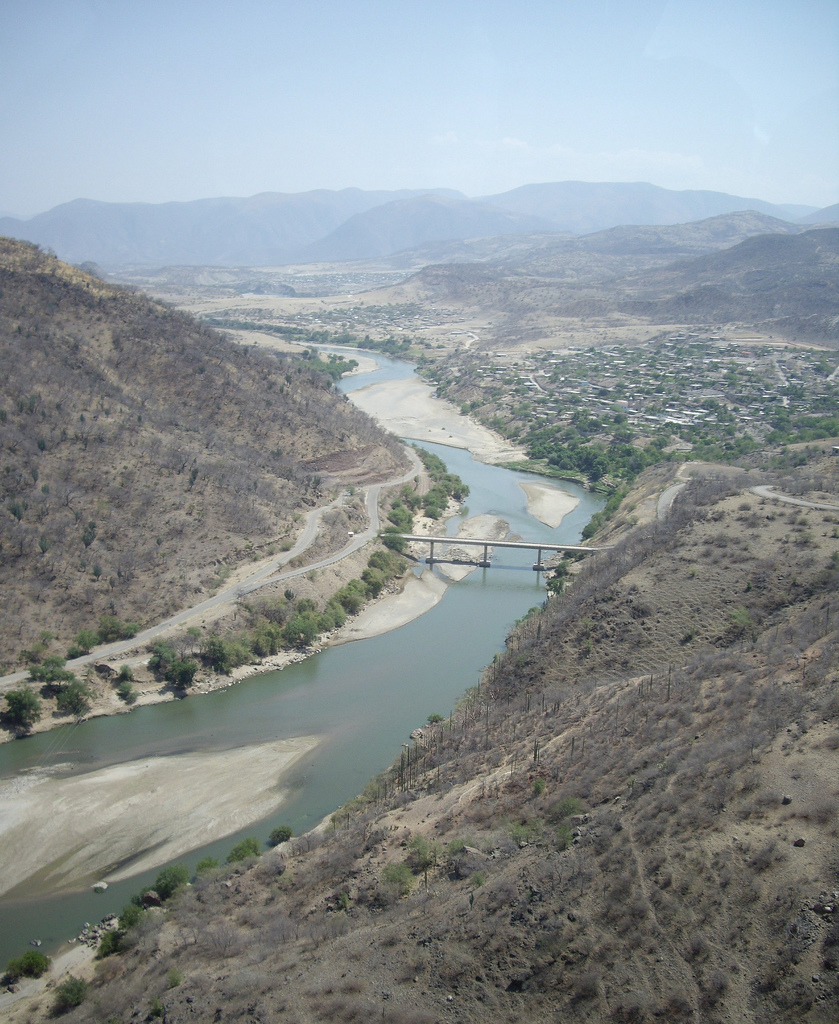
- Balsas River

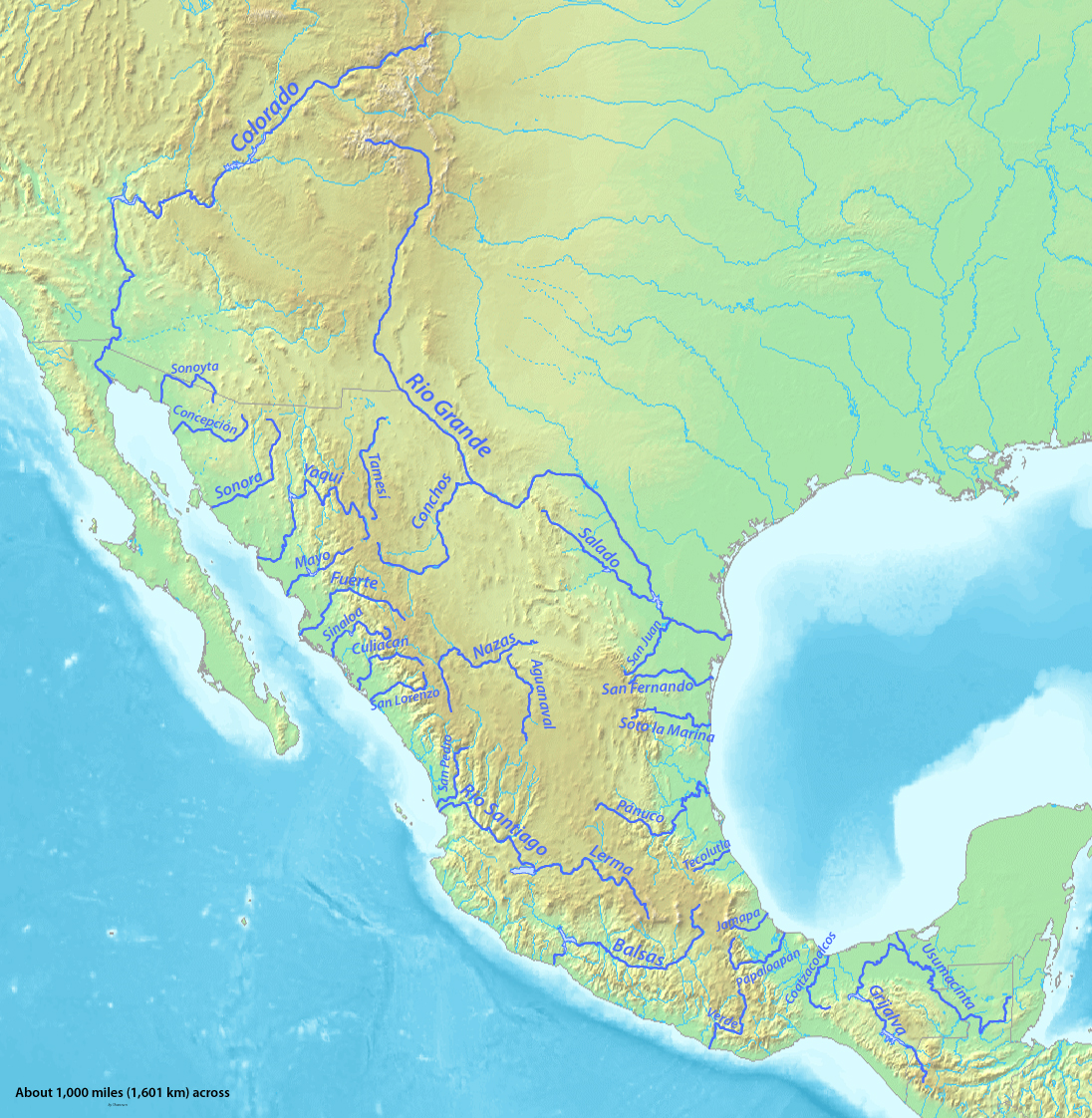
- Major rivers of Mexico, with Balsas in the southwest

Location
- Country: Mexico
- State: Michoacán

Physical characteristics
- Mouth
  - location: Mangrove Point, Pacific Ocean
- Length: 771 kilometers (479 mi)

Basin features
- River system: Confluence of the San Martín River and Zahuapan River

The Balsas River (Spanish Río Balsas, also locally known as the Mezcala or Atoyac) is a major river of south-central Mexico.

The basin flows through the states of Guerrero, México, Morelos, and Puebla. Downstream of Ciudad Altamirano, Guerrero, it forms the border between Guerrero and Michoacán. The river flows through the Sierra Madre del Sur, and empties into the Pacific Ocean at Mangrove Point, adjacent to the city of Lázaro Cárdenas, Michoacán. Several rapids along the course of the Balsas River limit its navigability and thus the river has been largely used for generation of hydroelectric power, flood control and irrigation.

== History ==
The Balsas River valley was possibly one of the earliest maize growing sites in Mexico, dating from around 9200 years ago. Though it is known that successive communities of Yopis, Cohuixcas, Matlatzincas, Chontales, Tlahuicas and Xochimilcas have lived in the region, archeological excavations in the area have yet to establish the hierarchical succession of the various communities. During the period 1300–1500 CE the region between the lower Balsas river valley and the Lerma-Santiago River fell under control of the Tarascan-Purépecha Empire.

According to the 1980 Census, 47,000 people lived along the Balsas river banks, spread over 37 communities, within the six municipalities of the region. Nahua peoples constitute 47% of the population, 15% are indigenous people (speaking four different languages), other large communities are Mixtec (23%) and Tlapanec (19%), and the balance 4% are Amuzgo. The population increased to 60,000 in the 1990s. The communities, while retaining their individualities, show close linguistic, kinship, and cultural relationships - revealed, for example, when they perform the rituals of patronal feasts.

== Geography and climate ==
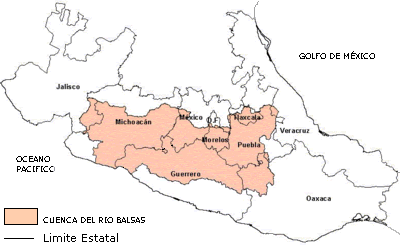
Balsas River basin

The upper Balsas River basin includes the State of Puebla, the States of Mexico, Morelos, and the Guerrero Mountain Zone, as well as several river systems of the Mesa Central plateau. The main system is of the Tlapanec River, with tributaries originating in the mountains such as the Oaxaca Mixteca. It is joined by the Amacuzac River fed by streams around Xonacantapec volcano and by the San Jeronimo and Chontalcoatlan rivers. The last two rivers originate around Popocatepetl volcano and flow through the State of Morelos.

With a length of some 771 kilometers (479 mi) the Balsas River is one of Mexico's longest rivers. It originates at the confluence of the San Martin and Zahuapan Rivers as Atoyac River in the state of Puebla. From here it flows south-west and then westward, into a depression through the state of Guerrero, and discharges into the Pacific Ocean at 17°56′24″N 102°08′16″W.

The climate of the basin varies from temperate to subtropical with mean annual temperatures between 12.5 and 28 °C. Rainfall in the basin is highly seasonal and some 90% of annual precipitation occurs between May and September, with 546 mm recorded in the arid areas of the valley and 1000–1600 mm further upstream in the highland lakes area.

== River basin development ==
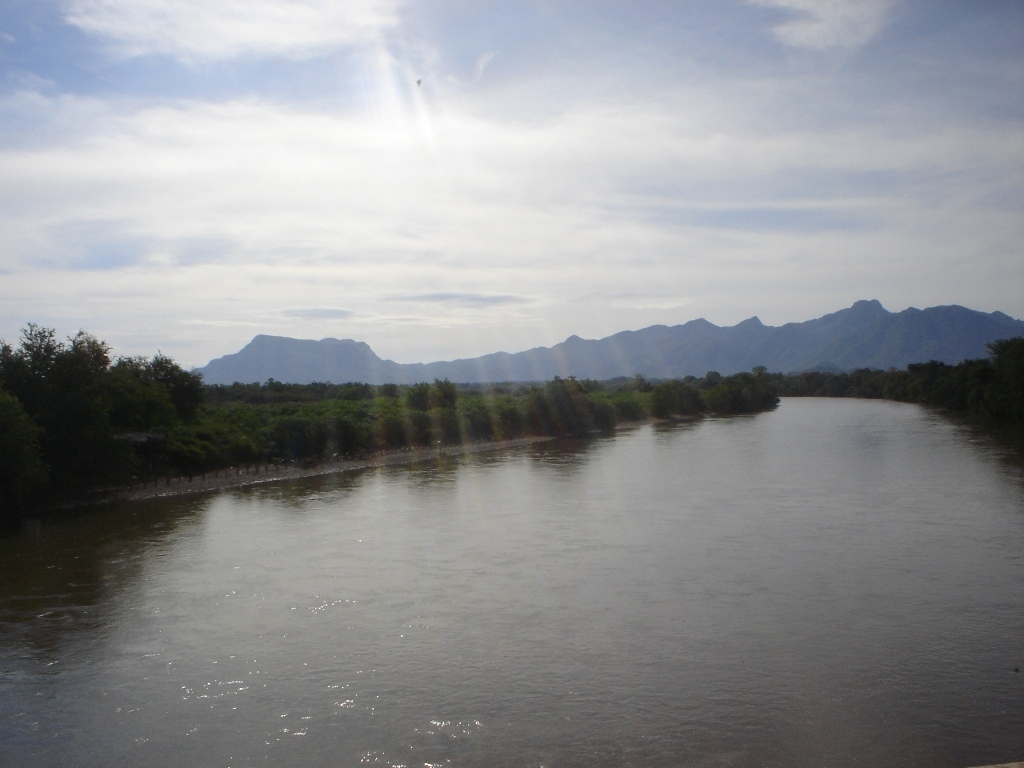
The river at Coyuca de Catalán

The Balsas River basin has witnessed much economic development. Through building dams these activities aimed at irrigation, generation of electricity, and improving agriculture and living conditions of indigenous people, mainly the Nahuas who form the majority group. Seven hydropower projects are envisaged on the Balsas River. The two major projects are the La Villita and El Infiernello (in Michoacan). The Carlos Ramirez Ulloa (El Caracol) project is being developed in the Guerrero and four others are planned for the future.

=== River Basin Councils ===
Water management has received due attention of the Government of Mexico over the past several decades. It included more efficient water use and aimed to meet water supply needs of the major cities in Mexico. The Tepalcatepec Commission was established in 1947 under the Ministry of Water Resources (one of the three commissions established initially) for the Balsas River development. In 1960, it was subordinated to the Balsas River Commission. Its tasks included planning, design, coordination and implementation of irrigation projects, flood control and hydropower generation, covering rural and urban development and health and communications aspects. Following the enactment of a new Water Law in the country, a Master Plan was developed in 1975 covering 13 hydrological regions (102 subregions). River Basin Councils were established, and 25 are currently in position out of the 26 planned.

The Balsas River has a discharge of 15–17 m^{3}/s during the lean flow season. The steep slope of the river in a stretch of 30 km creates an elevation difference of 1200 m, providing excellent opportunities for hydropower development. Initially, 120 MW of power was generated at the power station at La Villita. This 336 MW station was built in the state of Michoacan, near the Pacific Coast. Another Balsas River project planned was the El Infiernillo; it became operational in 1964 and has an installed capacity of 1,120 MW. The Infiernillo Dam is a 149 m rockfill embankment dam.

=== Agriculture ===
Agriculture in the basin has a rich history of over 9000 years, with an impressive transformation from the stage of unwelcome grass to high-yield maize fields.

=== Irrigation and hydroelectric power generation ===
Two dams on the river provide for irrigation and power generation. The water stored by the dam built above Tierra Caliente is utilized for growth of cotton and rice. The Balsas River basin was first considered for hydropower development in the 1940s. The basin has an area of 105,900 km^{2}, and the two projects implemented here are the La Villita and El Infiernello (both in Michoacan).

The Infiernillo Dam is a 149 m rock fill embankment dam with a narrow central core. It is located on the Balsas River about 200 miles (320 km) southwest of Mexico City. Its height is about 148 m, crest length is 344 m, and the base width from the upstream toe to the downstream toe is 570 m. The reservoir has a storage capacity of 7,090 million m^{3}. This is the largest hydropower project in Mexico which is also expected to reduce the floods in the area.

La-Villita is an earth-cum-rock fill dam with a crest length of 320 m, a height of 60 m, and a power generation capacity of 300 MW. This was the first dam built on the Balsas River. It is located 15 km from the Pacific Ocean.

Both dams have a solid structure and withstood well the five earthquakes of the magnitude up to 8.1 which occurred after their construction.

=== Transbasin water transfer ===
A project has been implemented to redirect some water from the Balsas River basin to the Lerma River Basin and the Valley of Mexico. It aimed to meet the growing drinking-water needs of Mexico City, which is about 130 km from the basin. Such transfers are expected to create water-sharing disputes among the basin states in the future.

=== Navigational studies ===
The navigation of this river by shallow-draft steamers was initially promoted for the development of the Guerrero area, and in 1911 a new concession was given by the Government of Mexico for this purpose. The proposal was to use the river for passengers and freight from the point of crossing of the Acapulco Trail to the Pacific Ocean, over the river length of about 300 miles. Initially a 25-foot boat was commissioned at Balsas railroad bridge station by Gullermo Niven, a business man in Mexico City who set out to establish its feasibility in November/December 1911. He had carried recommendation letters from President Madero of Mexico to important persons in towns and villages on the way. On this exploration he was accompanied by 11 people, including two river navigation experts and Fred Macfarlene, a California financier. The exploration lasted 22 days from the time of its departure till the return of the team back to Mexico City via Manzanillo on the steamboat S.S. Ramón Corral which picked the exploration party at the last point of their journey at Orilla. During this period many events happened en route due to rebel activities, but the navigation itself was fairly smooth except for an encounter with a rock outcrop in the middle of a narrow section of the river where the boat overturned, injuring two people. While the river was proven navigable, investments to develop the facilities did not happen immediately due to the rebel activities in the area.

== Maize domestication ==
Balsas Valley is known as the cradle of the original maize domestication.

Archaeologist Richard MacNeish originally pointed out the importance of the Valley of Tehuacán, part of which also belongs to the Balsas valley, for maize domestication. He found over 10,000 teosinte cobs in the Coxcatlan Cave. Later, in 1989, the early date was confirmed by testing. Maize samples from Cueva San Marcos, and Cueva Coxcatlan in Tehuacán neighborhood had been tested. The oldest dates were 4700 BP (uncalibrated) or 3600 BC (calibrated).

Balsas River valley continues downstream into Guerrero state. There are also very early maize sites there, which attracted attention more recently.

Recent research supports Balsas River valley as the first place in the world where maize was domesticated about 9000 years ago.

The so-called "Balsas teosinte", now considered to be the direct predecessor of maize, grows mostly in the middle part of the Balsas Valley at this time. In the past, it may have grown in other parts of this valley, as palaeoclimatology studies show. In particular, the Xihuatoxtla Shelter, located in Iguala valley, provides the best stratigraphy.

Recent debates among scientists center on where exactly in the Balsas River valley this type of teosinte (Zea mays ssp. parviglumis) grew in times past, when corn was domesticated.

== Arts and crafts ==
During the Purépecha period, the people of the valley created many items of red-slipped buff-colored pottery, painted in white, cream, or red and made many ceramic pipes and tools using bronze alloys. The indigenous Amerindians inhabiting the Balsas River valley are noted for their bark paintings, often depicting flowers and wildlife.

== See also ==
- Balsas dry forests
- Tehuacán Valley matorral
- The Mezcala culture or Balsa culture developed in the upper Balsa River area between 700 and 200 BC.
- List of longest rivers of Mexico
