= Cuetzala del Progreso =

City in the Mexican state of Guerrero

- Municipal seat and city
- Location in Mexico Cuetzala del Progreso (Mexico)
- Coordinates: 18°17′N 99°50′W
- Country: Mexico
- State: Guerrero
- Municipality: Cuetzala del Progreso
- Time zone: UTC-6 (Zona Centro)

Cuetzala del Progreso is a city and the seat of the municipality of Cuetzala del Progreso, in the southern Mexican state of Guerrero.

== History ==
Prehispanic Cuetzala was inhabited by a Nahua people who may have been a subgroup of the Coixcas. Their major cult was that of Huītzilōpōchtli and his sister, and they did not cremate their dead. When the Spaniards arrived, Cuetzala was in conflict with the nearby Chontal town of Apaxtla. The Chontal claimed that they had granted the Nahuas land only to be later betrayed by them. This was denied by the Nahuas, who claimed they had lived in caves and survived by hunting until eventually building their own town. The ruler of Cuetzala had the title chalchiuyztecutli. The town produced a small amount of salt for local usage, as well as copper which was given to the Aztecs as tribute.
