= Castrejón =

Castrejón may refer to:

- Apaxtla de Castrejón, city and seat of the municipality of Apaxtla, in the state of Guerrero, south-western Mexico
- Castrejón de la Peña, municipality located in the province of Palencia, Castile and León, Spain
- Francisco Castrejón (born 1947), former Mexican football (soccer) goalkeeper
- Mambrilla de Castrejón, municipality located in the province of Burgos, Castile and León, Spain
