= Chontal language =

Chontal language may refer to:

- in Oaxaca,
  - one of the Tequistlatecan languages
- in Tabasco,
  - the Chontal Maya language
- in Guerrero,
  - the Guerrero Chontal language
