= Pièce du Procès de Pablo Ocelotl et ses Fils =

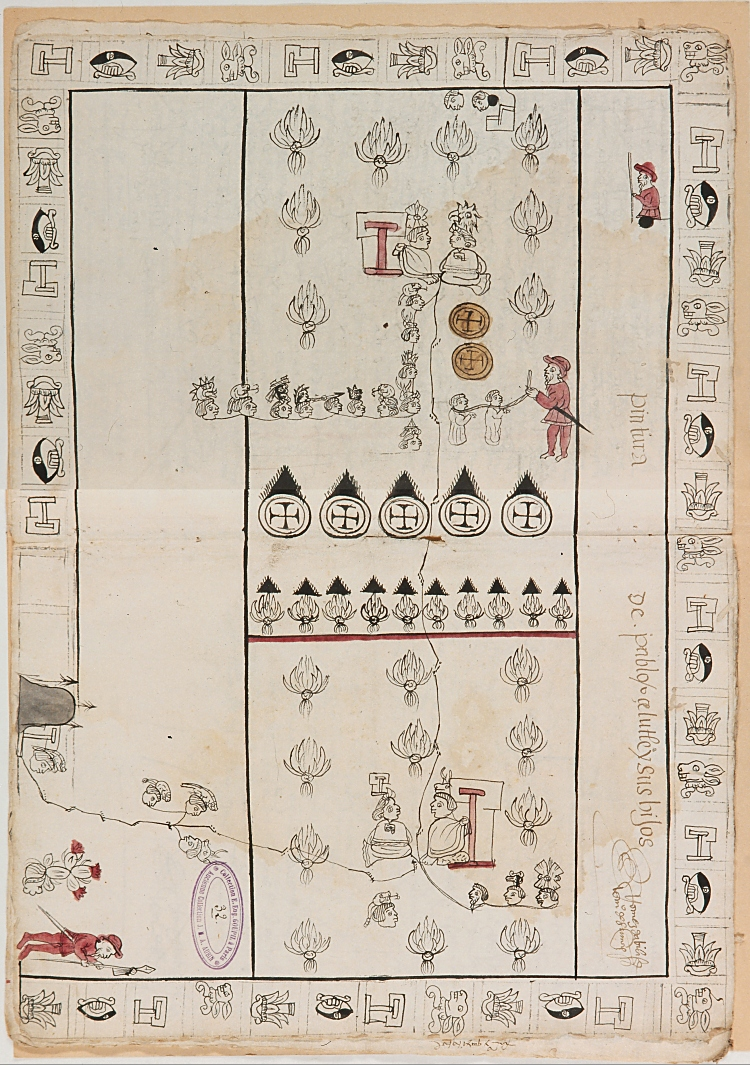

Pièce du Procès de Pablo Ocelotl et ses Fils (French for "Part of the Lawsuit of Pablo Ocelotl and his Children") is a colonial Mexican indigenous pictorial manuscript, originally used in a 1565 court case between the Matlatzinca Alonso González and the Nahua Pablo Ocelotl.

The manuscript is held by the Bibliothèque nationale de France.

== See also ==
- Aztec codices
