= Tepecoacuilco de Trujano (municipality) =

Municipality in the Mexican state of Guerrero

- Municipality
- Location in Mexico
- Coordinates: 17°54′N 99°41′W
- Country: Mexico
- State: Guerrero
- Municipal seat: Tepecoacuilco de Trujano

Area
  - Total: 984 km^{2} (380 sq mi)

Population (2005)
  - Total: 28,989

Tepecoacuilco de Trujano is a municipality in the Mexican state of Guerrero. The municipal seat lies at Tepecoacuilco de Trujano. The municipality covers an area of 984 km^{2}.

As of 2005, the municipality had a total population of 28,989.

== History ==
The Suriana region served as the site of crossing migrants, so presumably Tepecoacuilco was first inhabited by one of these primitive tribes, who came from the coast of Michoacán. Later, the Olmecs to the territory, and tribes settled on the Mezcala River, and numerous objects of Olmec style have been excavated from this region.

The Chontales faithfully preserved their cultural characteristics, and achieved important progress in political and social organization. This government was in element patriarchal, each village was governed by a Lord or the Patriarch and priests in temples. Their main gods were the rain god Tlamacasqui and the goddess Acxoyatl. They lived in huts built of adobe with palm roofs. Men wore cloaks tied at the shoulder and loincloths, the women long petticoats. Their diet consisted of tortillas, corn, and vegetables.

In the 11th century, invaders penetrated the territory, Nahua tribes, which came from the north-west. Some of them settled by the Balsas River, to conquer the region and the Chontales. In this tribe was known as the Nahua-coixca, which means "Plain of snake." The Coixcas arrived and were completely primitive, surviving by hunting, farming and living in caves. Their warrior god was Huitzilopochtli.
