= Isthmus of Tehuantepec Wind Farm Corridor =

Wind farm in Mexico

Isthmus of Tehuantepec Wind farm corridor
- Country: Mexico
- Location: Oaxaca
- Coordinates: 16°29′9″N 94°56′51″W
- Owner: multiple
- Operator: multiple

Wind farm
- Type: Onshore

The Isthmus of Tehuantepec Wind Farm Corridor is a group of wind farms in the Isthmus of Tehuantepec, Mexico. The geography of the isthmus allows for strong winds blowing from the Gulf of Mexico to the Pacific Ocean. This makes the region very suitable for wind energy farms.

The development and presence of these large wind farms has resulted in resistance from local indigenous communities over land, sociological and environmental impact.

== Background ==
Beside being the narrowest land section in Mexico, the Isthmus of Tehuantepec also has the Chivela Pass which is an interruption of the Sierra Madre mountain range. These geographical and meteorological conditions allow for really strong winds, especially during the winter months.

The wind energy potential of the region is clearly visible in the statistics. Oaxaca, the state where the wind farm corridor is located, has enough wind farms to produce 2.278MW of energy. As reference, the total amount of wind energy produced in Mexico is 7.782MW according to the Mexican Wind Power Association (AMDEE)

Most of the wind farms are built by large multinationals with the power output also intended for private multinationals like Walmart, Nestlé and coca-cola. The used self supply energy contracts reduce the energy bill for these companies and allow them to compensate emissions. Only a few of these wind farms are for public energy production.

== Resistance ==
The region is home to five indigenous groups, namely: Binnizá, Ikoots, Mixe, Chontal and Zoque. From the beginning, these local indigenous communities have resisted the wind farms, even resulting in violence and death. There are several reasons why they opposed the wind farms.

=== Lack of information and consultation ===
One of the main points of resistance is due to the lack of information about the new projects and the lack of public consultation of the affected population. Mexico has laws in place to protect local communities during projects like these. However, these obligations were neglected.

=== Environmental damage due to oil spills ===
It has been reported by locals that the oil used in the wind turbine for maintenance leaks and pollutes the ground and water. Wind turbine operators explain that this has happened in some cases, but that all affected soil and vegetation is cleaned.

=== Noise pollution ===
Wind farms are known to produce noise pollution comparable to that produced by local traffic and industrial operations. There are several locations where the homes are closer than 500m away from a wind turbine. While existence of the wind turbine syndrome is not accepted as a real illness, interviews with locals indicate that these people feel they are deceived or excluded from talks or benefits of the wind farms. This can create stress and discomfort and related health issues.

=== Clashes with security forces ===
The resistance has also led to several violent clashes between security forces and the local community and resulted clashes and deaths:

- On 2 February 2013, police forces numbering roughly 500 clashed with people protesting against the Marña Renovables project.
- Hector Regalado, who opposed the wind farms, was assassinated in 2013.
- Alberto Toledo Villabos, who opposed mines and high energy prices in the region, was beaten to death in 2017.
- Rolando Crispín López, a municipal police officer, was shot and killed in February 2018.

=== Effects on birds ===
Because of the geography of the region, the Isthmus is an important corridor for migratory birds. The wind farms' licenses in these areas include requirements for bird monitoring programs. Independent research in the region has shown though that some groups of birds have learned the location of the wind farms and diverted their routes.

=== Financial benefits for land owners and the community ===
Part of the dissatisfaction with these energy projects are the lack of financial benefits. It is perceived that land owners benefit directly due to financial compensation. This in contrast to the community who don´t directly benefit but bear the negative consequences like noise pollution.

But still, this financial compensation is seen as low compared to other countries. Communities have reported compensation ranging from $0.10 per hectare to a compensation of $2.900 for 100 acre (= 40 hectare = $72.5 per hectare). This in contrast to Spain and the US where respectively around $6.400 and $3.000-8.000 per MW wind turbine is disbursed while the community reported a $1669 compensation per wind turbine. Other sources indicate that between 1% and 5% of the income per wind turbine is normally paid out to the landowner while in Mexico this said to be between 0.025% and 1.53%.

Beside the use of different comparison methods and units, another thing to take into account is that different parts of the energy infrastructure (e.g. a wind turbine or a power cable) have different land requirements and thus allow for varying compensation.
