= Apaxtla =

Municipality in the Mexican state of Guerrero

- Municipality
- Coat of arms

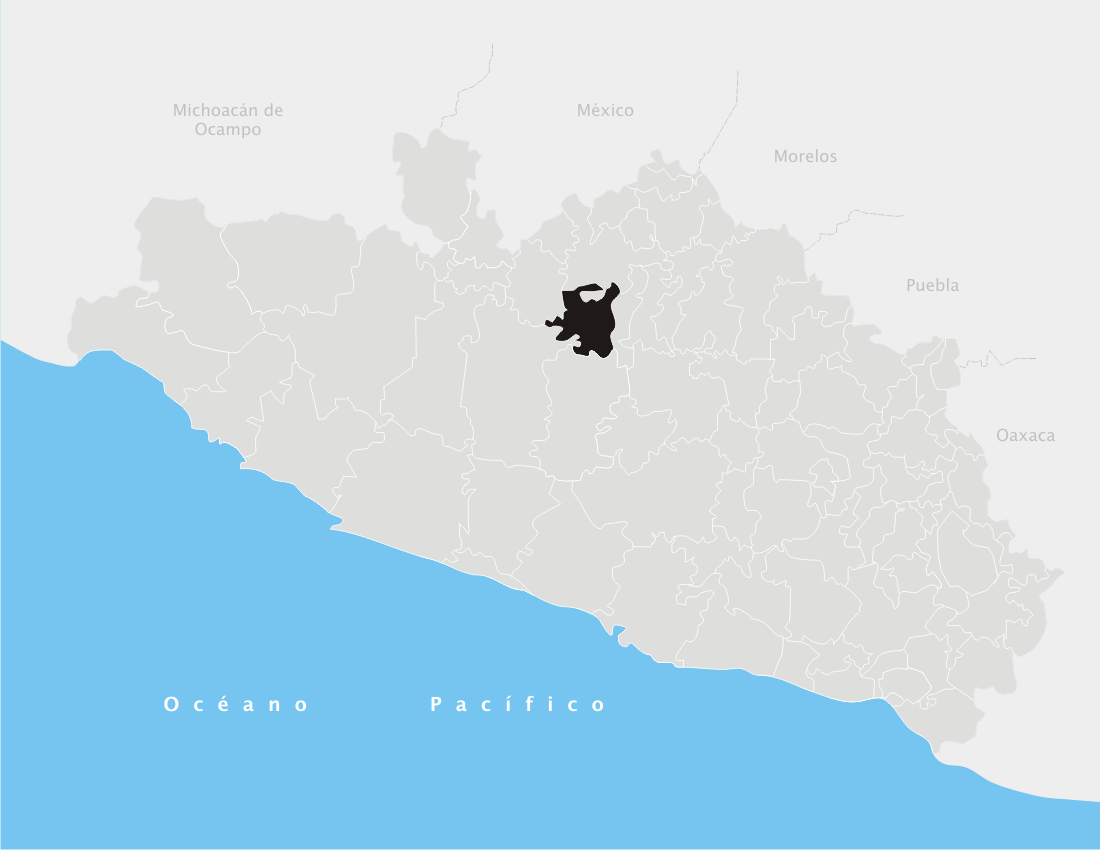
- Municipality of Apaxtla in Guerrero

- Location in Mexico
- Coordinates: 17°57′N 99°53′W
- Country: Mexico
- State: Guerrero
- Municipal seat: Apaxtla de Castrejón

Area
  - Total: 857.1 km^{2} (330.9 sq mi)

Population (2005)
  - Total: 12,381

Apaxtla is a municipality in the Mexican state of Guerrero. The municipal seat lies at Apaxtla de Castrejón. The municipality covers an area of 857.1 km^{2}.

In 2005, the municipality had a total population of 12,381.
