= Chontal =

Chontal (from Nahuatl languages: chontalli, 'foreigner') may refer to various ethnic groups in the Mesoamerican world.

== Pre-Conquest Maya region ==
- Chontal or Putún Maya, a collective name for several groups of Maya during the Late Classic and Postclassic Eras

== Mexico ==
=== Guerrero ===
- Chontal people (Guerrero), an extinct indigenous people in northern Guerrero
- Chontal language (Guerrero), their language

=== Tabasco ===
- Chontal Maya people, an indigenous people of Tabasco
- Chontal Maya language, spoken by the Chontal Maya people

=== Oaxaca ===
- Chontal of Oaxaca, another name for the Tequistlatecan languages
  - Lowland Oaxaca Chontal, another name for the Huamelula language
  - Highland Oaxaca Chontal, a language spoken by some indigenous people in the state

== Nicaragua ==
- Chontales Department, one of fifteen departments in Nicaragua
- Chontal of Nicaragua (es), the ethnicity for which the department is named after
