= Cuetzala del Progreso (municipality) =

Municipality in the Mexican state of Guerrero

- Municipality
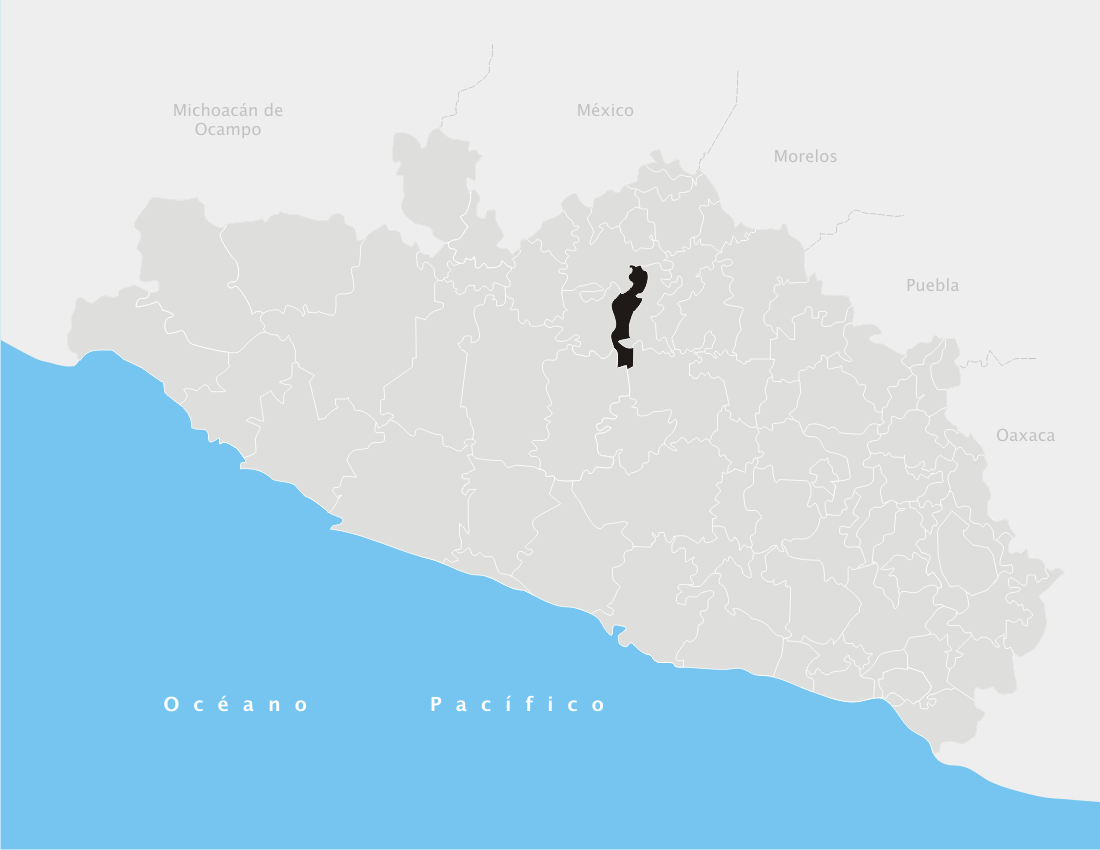
- Municipality of Cuetzala del Progreso in Guerrero

- Location in Mexico
- Coordinates: 17°56′N 99°45′W
- Country: Mexico
- State: Guerrero
- Municipal seat: Cuetzala del Progreso

Area
  - Total: 449.8 km^{2} (173.7 sq mi)

Population (2005)
  - Total: 9,869

Cuetzala del Progreso is a municipality in the Mexican state of Guerrero. Its municipal seat is Cuetzala del Progreso. It covers an area of 49.8 km^{2}. In 2005, its population was 9,869.
