= Tehuacalco =

Archaeological site in Guerrero, Mexico

Coordinates: 17°11′13.13″N 99°30′5.86″W

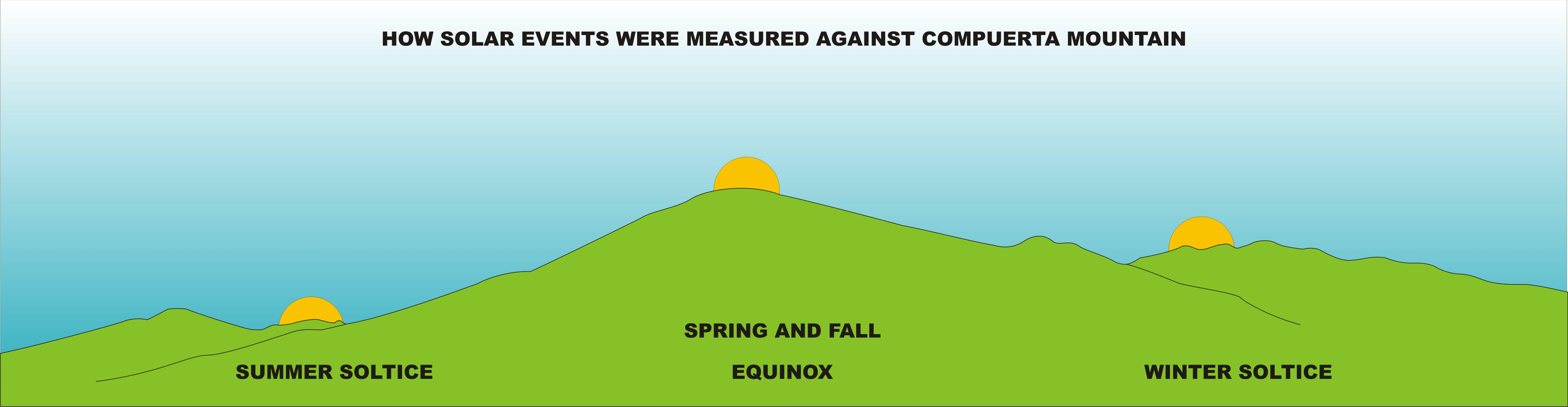
Diagram of how solar events were calculated with sunrises against the Compuerta Mountain at Tehuacalco

Tehuacalco is an archeological site located near the city of Chilpancingo, Guerrero, Mexico. It is the first such site associated with the Yope people to be excavated, in the 2000s. The site is on a hill surrounded by mountains, which were worshipped by the Yope. Four marked the cardinal directions and one, Compuerta, was used to mark solar events such as equinoxes and solstices as the Sun rose behind it. Tehuacalco was occupied as a ceremonial site from c. 400 CE – c. 1100 CE. The site was opened to the public in 2008.

== Location ==
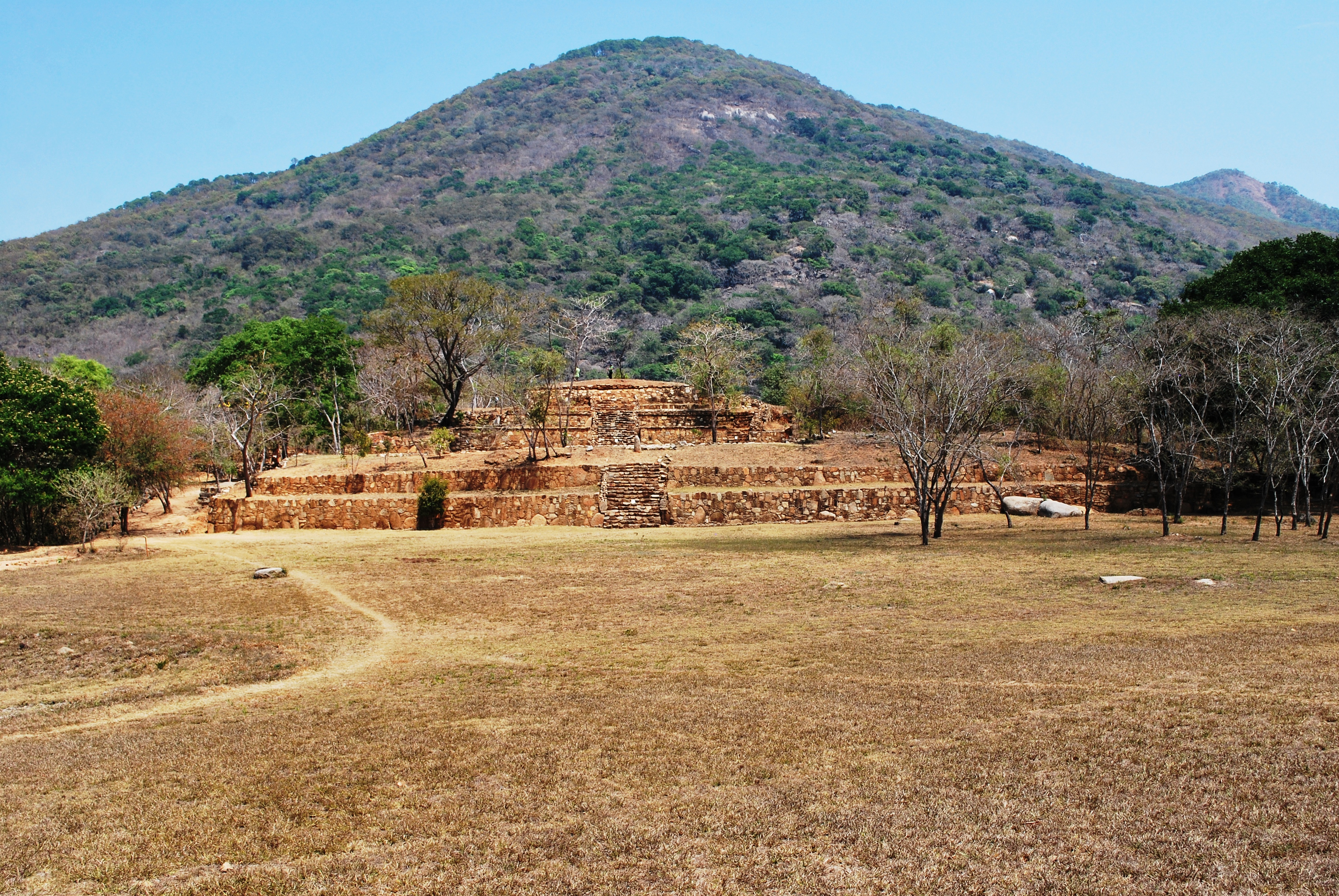
The Palace with the Compuerta mountain behind it

The site is located in the state of Guerrero, near the state capital of Chilpancingo, near the Mexico City-Acapulco highway. The closest communities are La Haciendita, Camizal de la Vía, El Potrero and Garrapatas, which belong to the Camizal de la Vía ejidos, with the largest nearby community being Tierra Colorada. The environment of the area is deciduous tropical forest, whose trees lose most of their leaves during the dry season in the fall and winter.

== History ==
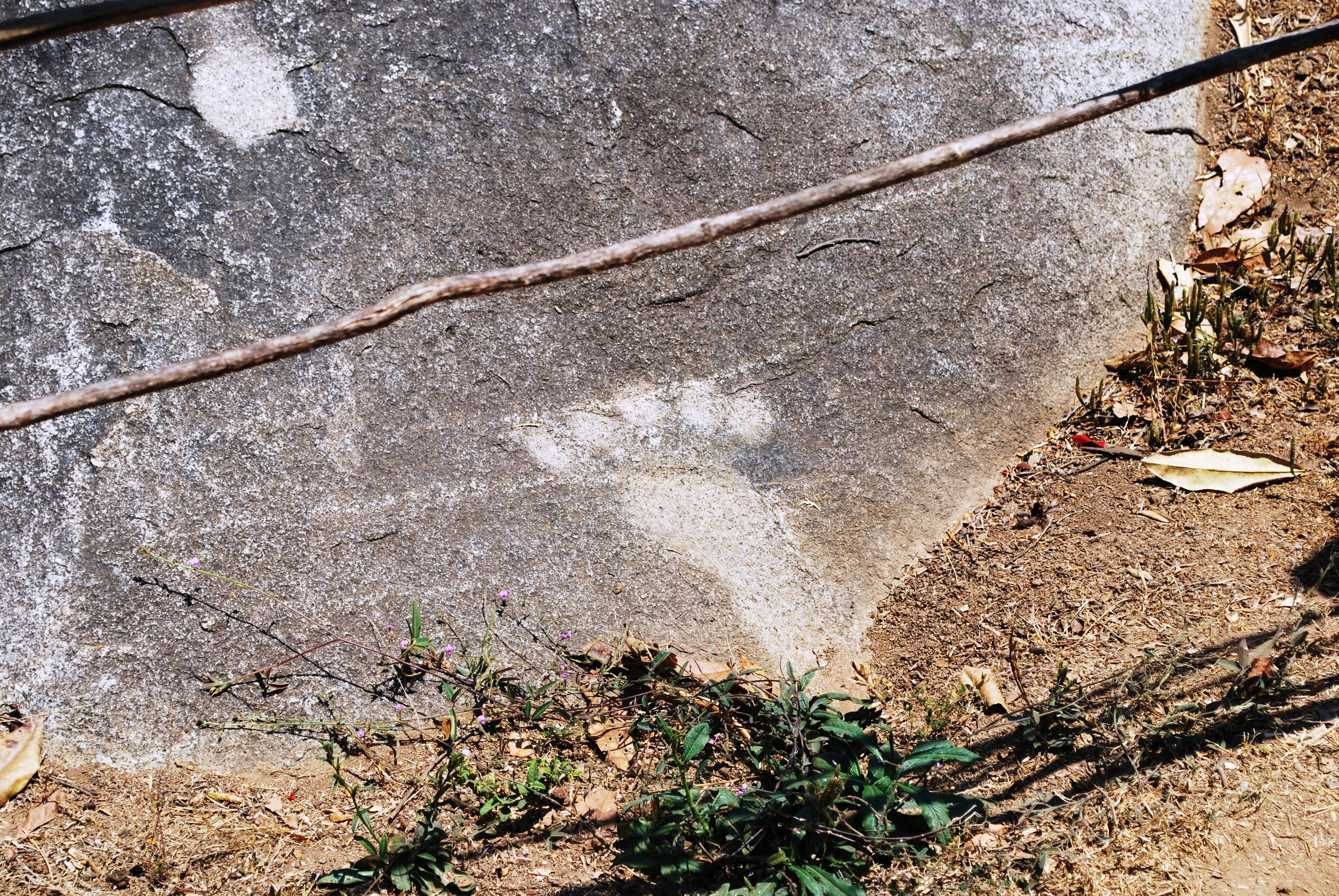
Rock with etchings called the "Giant's footprints"

The name of the site comes from the Nahuatl phrase “tehuacalli” which refers to holes bored into stones to be used for ritual purposes. It can be interpreted various ways such as “place of the stone box,” “house of priests” or “house of the sacred water”.

While mostly associated with the Yopes, it is not completely certain. There may have been Yopime or even Tlapaneca settlements here as well. Occupation of the site began around 400CE with its height between 650 and 1100CE. At this time, the population center covered about eighty hectares and the ceremonial center covered twelve. Most of the structures were built when the Toltecs were at the height of their influence. The Yopes of Tehuacalco were sedentary farmers with different social classes with classes of rulers and priests on top, followed by warriors, merchants and artisans. The diet consists of meat from hunting and corn. The Yopes thought of the mountains as repositories of water and seeds. These mountains were worshipped as a way to ensure good harvests. The sun was thought to be devoured by a monster at the end of the day and had to fight in the underworld to arise the next morning. It was considered obligatory to “feed” the sun to help it return.

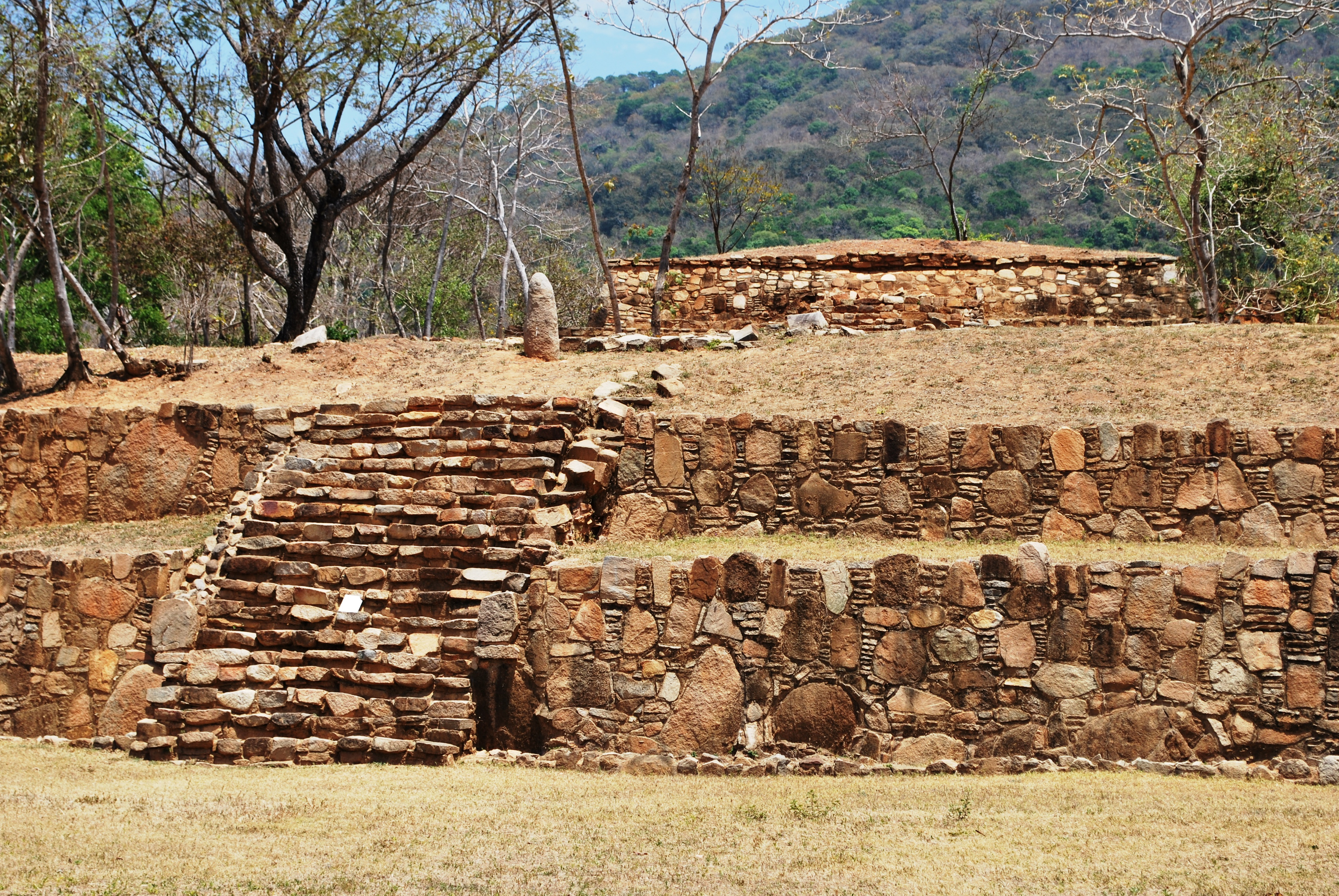
The Palace at Tehuacalco

The region around the site was named Yopitzingo in Nahuatl, and it was one of the few areas that the Aztecs could not conquer in the late Post Classic period even though by then the Yopes had become semi nomadic practicing intermittent agriculture. However, after the Spanish Conquest, the Yope were decimated by European diseases. They did not submit completely to Spanish rule and had one major rebellion. However, this was crushed with the Spanish scattering the remaining Yopes to other settlements.

Tehuacalco is the first site related to the Yope to be extensively explored, which was done in the 2000s. Nineteen structures have been discovered so far, mostly by field work performed in 2006 and 2007. Afterwards, forty million pesos were spent to ready the site for tourism and it was opened to the public in 2008. It is one of twelve sites opened to the public during the Calderon administration from 2006 to 2012. There is a welcome center with explanations about the site in Spanish, but the explanatory signs on the site are in Spanish and English.

== Composition of the site ==
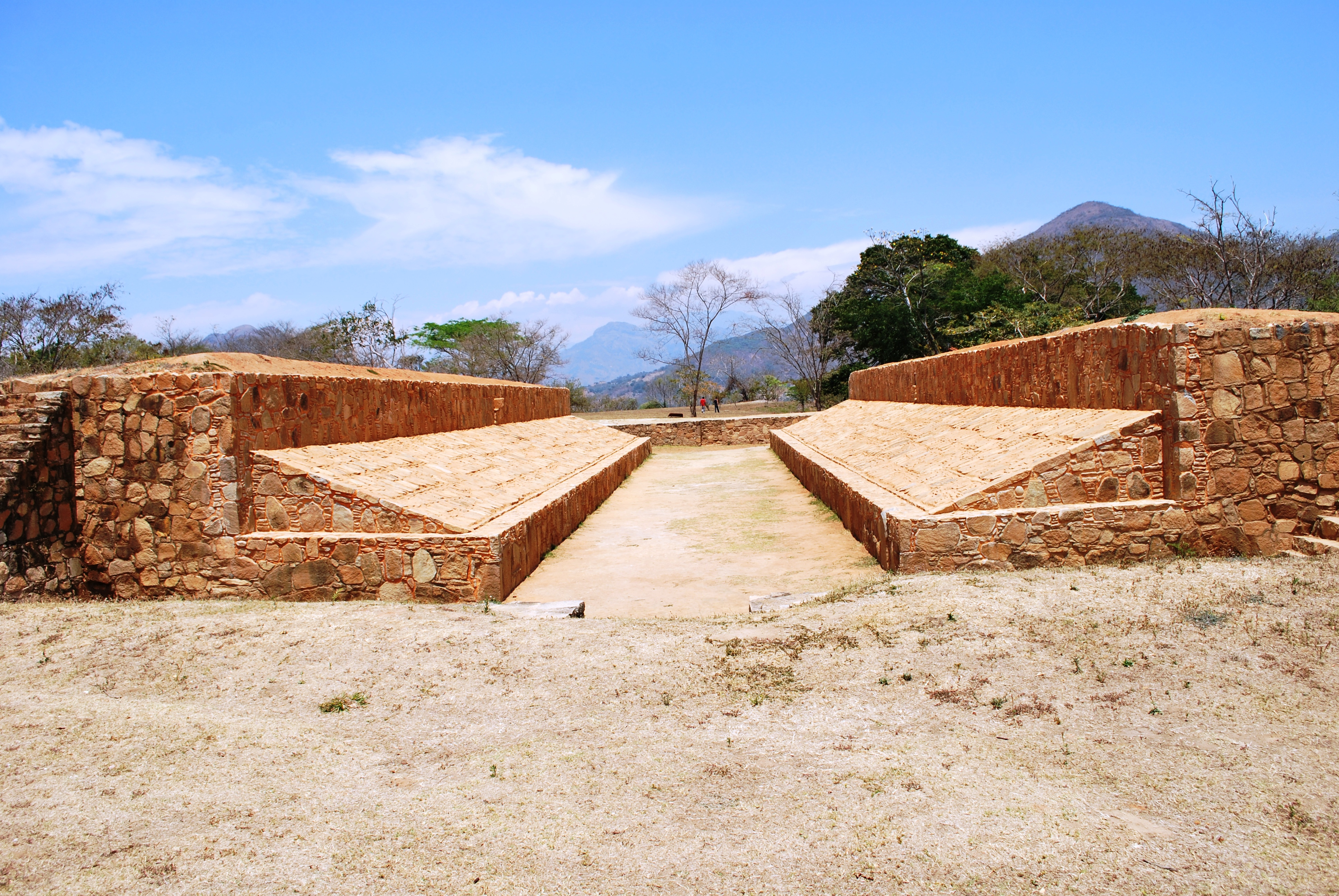
The Mesoamerican ball court

The site is located on a hill surrounded by taller mountains. Four of these mountains, Compuerta, Capulín, Tierra Colorada and Gavilpan, mark the cardinal directions. The site hill was considered to be a “fifth” direction, where power was concentrated.

The site has four aspects, areas with rock etchings, the surrounding mountain terrain, pyramidal structures and caves in the hills with offerings. The rock etchings include the Piedra de los Pies Pintados, with markings of feet and Monument W which has circular patterns used to counts lunar cycles. Fifty seven caves on the sides of Compuerta have been explored with findings of offerings such as braziers and incense burners. These caves were related to the worship of the sun. The site possesses various characteristics related to archaeoastronomy . The site is oriented towards the Compuerta Mountain. This mountain and smaller peaks on each side were used to mark equinoxes and solstices, as the sun rose from behind them.

The site was a ceremonial center with a plaza surrounded by various pyramid bases and other structures. The site has a distinct construction style, which consists of boulders with spaces between them filled in with layers of flat rock and red clay. This allows the structures to withstand earthquakes. Of the discovered structures, eight are considered major complexes with the rest minor. The most import of these is four large pyramidal structures and a Mesoamerican ball court. Some of the pyramid bases are in unusually good condition. The four main structures are Encinera or Main Temple, the Palace, the Templo del Espejo de Agua and Platform W. The Palace, also denominated as Building Five, is the largest on the site, with a base that measures eighty meters on each side. It has sunken patios and various courts. The La Encinera is twenty meters tall and was the site for various rituals performed by priests and rulers. The ball court measures 37.8 meters long. Platform W had residences for the elite with internal patios and drainage systems. However, the most sacred part of the site is a hill dedicated as sanctuary for the worship of water and rain. Some of the minor structures include the Templo Verde, the Templo Rojo and La Anona. The last two form the Solar Group.
