= Cocula Municipality, Guerrero =

Municipality in the Mexican state of Guerrero

Cocula
- Municipality
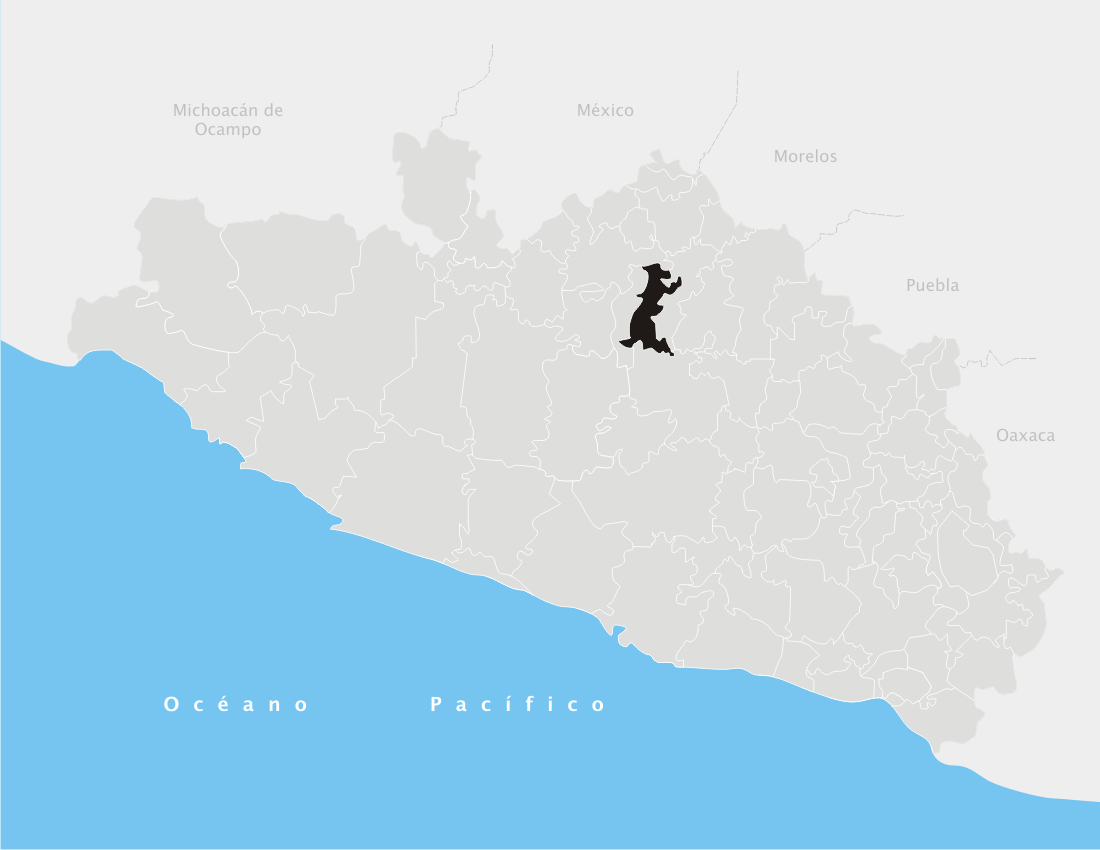
- Municipality of Cocula in Guerrero

- Location in Mexico
- Coordinates: 17°59′N 99°38′W
- Country: Mexico
- State: Guerrero
- Municipal seat: Cocula

Area
  - Total: 339.2 km^{2} (131.0 sq mi)

Cocula is a municipality in the Mexican state of Guerrero. The municipal seat lies at Cocula. The municipality covers an area of 339.2 km^{2}.

As of 2005, the municipality had a total population of 13,884.
