= Zahuapan River =

Coordinates: 19.17041°N 98.25006°W

Location
- Country: Mexico

The Zahuapan River is a river of Mexico.

== See also ==
- List of rivers of Mexico
