= Matlatzinca people =

Ethnic group

Matlatzinca (English: /ˌmɑːtlətˈsiŋkə/, Nahuatl pronunciation: [mat͡ɬat͡siŋka]) is a name used to refer to different Indigenous ethnic groups in the Toluca Valley in the state of México, located in the central highlands of Mexico. The term is applied to the ethnic group inhabiting the valley of Toluca and to their language, Matlatzinca. The Matlatzinca people share many cultural similarities to the Otomi and Mazahua, who speak related languages.

== Names ==
The name Matlatzinca is of Nahuatl origin, being derived from the word matlatl (net), because the Matlatzinca used nets to shuck corn. An alternative theory suggests it is derived from tematlatl (sling). Whatever the case, this name has also been spelled Matlalcinga or Matlaltzinga.

When used as an ethnonym, Matlatzinca refers to the people of Matlatzinco. Matlatzinco was the Aztec (Nahuatl) term for the Toluca Valley. The political capital of the valley was also referred to as Matlatzinco; this was a large city whose ruins are today known as the archaeological site of Calixtlahuaca. In prehispanic times the Toluca Valley was home to speakers of at least four languages: Otomi, Matlatzinca, Mazahua, and Nahuatl. Thus speakers of any of these languages could be called "Matlatzinca" if they resided in the Toluca Valley. When the Aztec native historical sources or the Spanish chroniclers refer to "the Matlatzinca" it is often not clear where they mean speakers of the Matlatzinca language, the peoples of the Toluca Valley, or even the inhabitants of Calixtlahuaca.

Another old name for the Matlatzinca is Quata (singular)/Quaquata (plural), derived from the Nahuatl quaitl (head) and ta (sling), thus meaning those who wear slings on their heads. This name was hispanized to guata.

In Michoacán, the Matlatzinca were referred to as Pirinda.

== History ==
The Toluca Valley is a likely candidate for the homeland of the Oto-Pamean peoples. Teotenango was a major regional power existing from 750 to 1162 CE associated with the expansion of the Matlatzinca culture. Around 750 CE, the Matlatzinca began to emerge as a distinct culture from the southern Otomi, and beginning in 1150 CE, the two began to consider themselves different peoples. This corresponds with some linguistic studies which date the separation of the Otomi and Matlatzinca languages to between the fifth and eighth centuries CE.

The Matlatzinca political system was theocratic and based upon a class distinction between nobility and commoners, where the nobility held land, collected taxes, governed, and carried out rituals and justice. Three high lords were superior to all others, and confirmed all local rulers after they were chosen in the towns. Besides Calixtlahuaca, other Matlatzinca towns in the Toluca valley included Toluca itself, Metepec, Jiquipilco, Calimaya, Tenango, and San Miguel Zinacantepec.

Parts of the Valley of Toluca were conquered by the Tepanec in the eleventh century, and some Otomi groups migrated into the Toluca Valley as a consequence of Chichimec migrations. The region was later conquered by the Aztec Empire in 1475 CE during the reign of Axayacatl, but they soon rebelled as the Aztecs clashed with the Purépecha Empire. This led to the Purépecha ruler Tzitzipandáquare enlisting some Matlatzincas as mercenaries in return for granting them lands in his empire, namely Charo and Huetamo. However, the Matlatzinca homeland remained under Aztec domination and was repopulated with Nahuas, beginning the decline of the Matlatzinca language.

Besides the Valley of Toluca and Michoacan, Matlatzincas were also found in the Valley of Mexico (Azcapotzalco, Tlacopan, Coyoacán), southern Mexico state (Tejupilco, Tonatico, Amatepec, Tlatlaya), Morelos (near Cuernavaca), and the state of Guerrero (Cocula, Alahuixtlan, Tepecoacuilco, Tlacozauhtitlan). Historical records also mention the "Matlame" in many of the same regions of the state of Guerrero, and they are usually considered a related group, or perhaps an alternative name for the Matlatzinca. However, they were only one of multiple ethnic groups in these regions, alongside the Chontal, Nahua groups (Coixcas, Tlahuica-Nahuas, Malinalca), and the Mazatecs of Guerrero. The Matlatzinca presence in these regions may have been a consequence of their dispersal from the Toluca Valley after it was conquered by the Aztecs.

== Language ==
The Matlatzinca language is part of the Oto-Pamean subgroup of the Oto-Manguean language family, which also includes Otomi, Mazahua, Pame and Chichimeca Jonaz. Linguistically, the term "Matlatzinca" refers to speakers Matlatzinca.

In ancient, historic, and modern times, Matlatzinca was spoken in the Toluca Valley of central Mexico, west of the Valley of Mexico. Matlatzinca has two subgroups or dialects that are mutually unintelligible: one called Ocuiltec or Tlahuica and Matlatzinca proper.

While originally one language, they are now so removed that they are often considered separate languages. Matlatzinca is severely endangered and now spoken by only around 100 mostly elderly people in San Francisco Oxtotilpan. Ocuiltec/Tlahuica is spoken by between 50 and 100 in the municipality of Ocuilan, in the villages of San Juan Atzingo and Santa Lucía del Progreso.

== Religion ==
The prehispanic Matlatzinca cosmology shows strong similarities with other Mesoamerican religions, such as those of the Otomi and the Nahua.

The universe was divided into four directions and the center divided into upper and lower planes. Reality was divided between these planes according to a dualistic principle, so that the sun, the masculine, sky, the day and man were associated with the upper plane, while the moon, the feminine, the earth, night and woman were associated with the lower plane. They worshipped the sun and moon, emphasizing the former because they were a warlike people. Earth, air, fire and water were associated with protector gods. The number six had a symbolic importance, as seen in the accounts of six lords accompanying King Xolotl in his conquest of the Toluca Valley, and six Matlatzinca lords who left the Toluca Valley for Chalco in the 12th century.

Ceremonial centers of towns formed sacred spaces, but sanctuaries could also be found in hills and caves. Deities included Tlamatzincatl (probably a god of the hunt), Quequex (another name for Otontecuhtli, the Otomi fire god), Oztoteotl (compared to Tlaloc and Tezcatlipoca), Coltzin (an agriculture god important in Toluca), Mixcoatl (possibly attributed to Nahua influence), and Quetzalcoatl (possibly attributed to Toltec influence).

== See also ==
- Malinalco (archeological site)
