= Coixcas =

Pre-conquest community in Mexico

The terms Coixcas, Coiscas or Cohuixcas describe a pre-conquest people located in the modern Mexican state of Guerrero, in particular the northern and central regions. This region was referred to as Coixcatlalpan or Cohuixco, and included towns such as Tixtla, Apango, Tlacozotitlan, Chilapa de Álvarez, Tepecoacuilco, San Agustín Oapan, Zumpango del Río, Huitzuco, Tlaxmalac and Mayanalan.

This was a multiethnic region, and Coixca communities were interspersed with those of other ethnic groups such as the Chontal, Tuxtec, Matlame (likely related to the Matlatzinca), and Tlapanec. They spoke Nahuatl, though their dialect was often distinguished in censuses, and considered rustic or unrefined by outsiders. The Coixcas likely have some relation to the modern speakers of Guerrero Nahuatl, which is spoken in some of the same places the Coixcas were found.

The Coixca presence in what is now Guerrero dates back centuries, likely to 1250 AD or earlier. They resisted the attempts of the Aztec Empire to conquer them, though ultimately falling under its domination. The area was later captured by the Spanish conquistadores. As part of the mestizaje process of the Spanish conquest, the Coixcas were merged into the community in Apango.

== Ruins ==
According to the people of modern Apango, there are few ruins of the ancient settlement, except a small temple three kilometers (2 miles) from the present Atliaca, midway between Apango and Tixtla.
