= Teloloapan =

City in the Mexican state of Guerrero

- Municipal seat and city
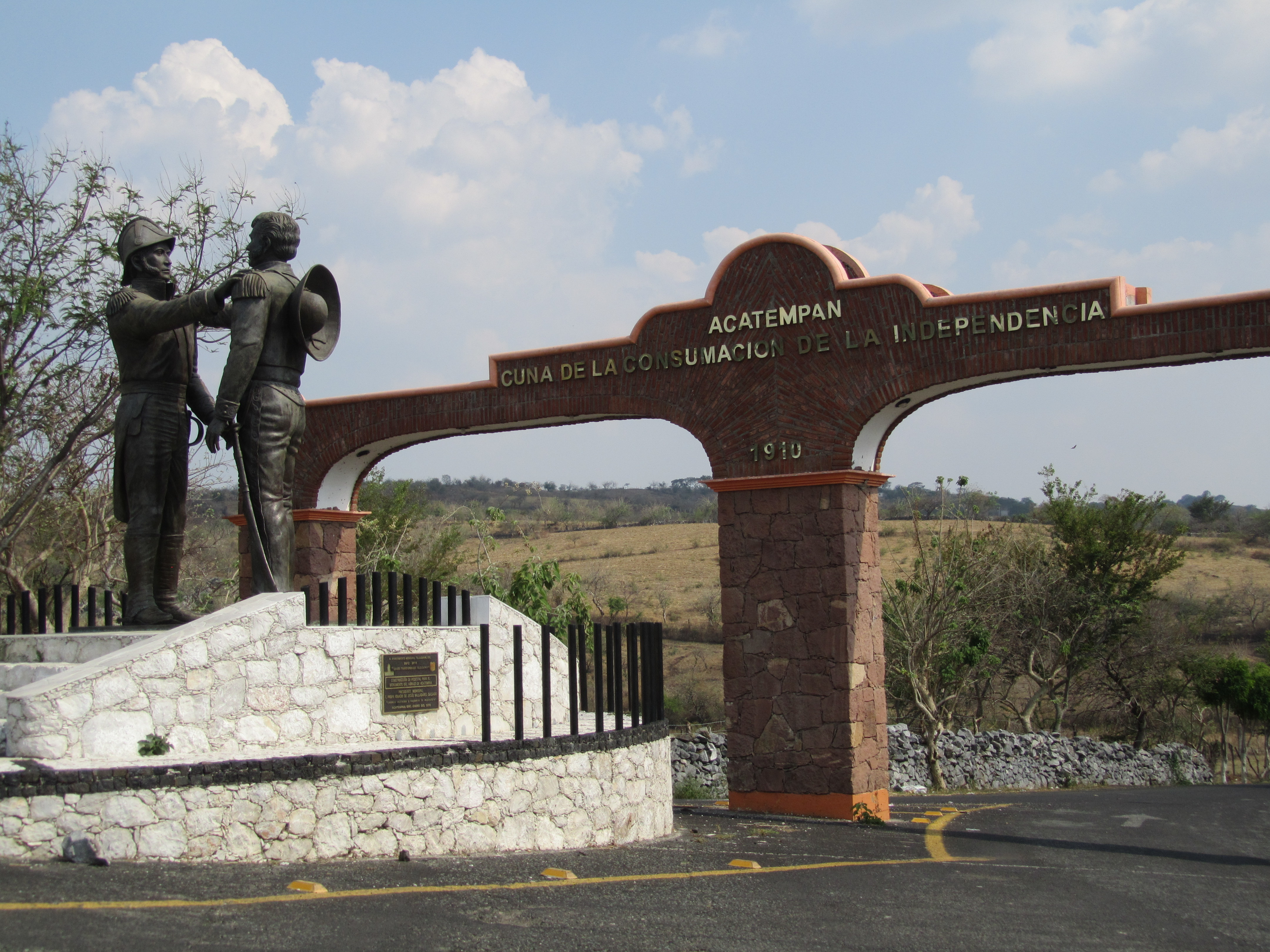

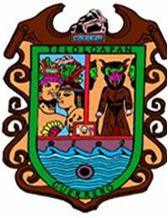
- Coat of arms

- Location within Guerrero Location within Mexico
- Coordinates: 18°21′N 99°51′W
- Country: Mexico
- State: Guerrero
- Municipality: Teloloapan

Population (2020)
  - Total: 25,148
- Time zone: UTC-6 (Zona Centro)

Teloloapan is a city and seat of the municipality of Teloloapan, in the Mexican state of Guerrero.

== History ==
In prehispanic times, Teloloapan was a large Chontal town dominated by a main street. Its ruler bore the title tletecutli and it fought wars against the Purepecha Empire. The relaciones geográficas reported that an unattested language referred to as "Ixcuca" was spoken in a particular quarter of Teloloapan in the 16th century, but nothing more is known of this language.
