= Apaxtla de Castrejón =

City in the Mexican state of Guerrero

- Municipal seat and city
- Location in Mexico Apaxtla de Castrejón (Mexico)
- Coordinates: 18°19′N 99°52′W
- Country: Mexico
- State: Guerrero
- Municipality: Apaxtla

Apaxtla de Castrejón is a city and seat of the municipality of Apaxtla, in the state of Guerrero, southern Mexico.
