= Tlapanec people =

Indigenous people of Mexico

Tlapanec
Meꞌphaa

Total population
- ~75,000

Regions with significant populations
- Mexico (Guerrero, Oaxaca, Morelos)

Languages
- Tlapanec, Spanish

Religion
- Roman Catholic, Protestant Christian, Animism

Related ethnic groups
- Subtiaba

The Tlapanec /ˈtlæpənɛk/, or Meꞌphaa, are an Indigenous people of Mexico native to the state of Guerrero. The Tlapanec language is a part of the Oto-Manguean language family, and is closely related to the now extinct Subtiaba language of Nicaragua. Today, Tlapanecs live primarily in the state of Guerrero and number more than 98,000.

In pre-Columbian times they lived in the isolated mountain area along the Costa Chica region of Guerrero, just east of present-day Acapulco. The main Tlapanec city was Tlapan and the name Tlapanec is Nahuatl for "Inhabitant of Tlapan". Their population on the eve of Spanish contact (c. 1520) has been estimated at roughly 54,000, representing 7% of the population of Guerrero at the time.

== Religion ==
The Tlapanecs explain natural phenomena through myth, like the myth of the creation of the sun (Akha'), the moon (Gon') and the fire god (Akuun mbatsuun'), who all were born on the bank of the river and who were raised by Akuun ñee, goddess of the temazcal sweatbath and patron of the hot/cold duality.

Another important element in their culture is nagualism. When a baby is born it is said that at the same time an animal is born and that that animal is the nahual of the child. No one except the child knows which animal is its nahual because the nahual will only show itself to the child in its dreams.

== Yopi people ==
Seemingly related to the Tlapanec proper were the Yopi (Yope) people, whose territory in the vicinity of Acapulco was called Yopitzinco. The Yopi, being formidable warriors, were never conquered by the Aztec Empire and remained an independent enclave surrounded by the Aztecs, yet were invited to the coronations of Mexica rulers in Tenochtitlan, where they were given gifts. There may have been some cultural differences with the Tlapanec proper, such as Yopi culture having a greater emphasis on hunting with the bow and arrow (children learning it starting from seven years of age) and not wearing clothing until marriage (and even then, only palm leaves and deerskins). They have frequently been described as poorer and less civilized than other Mesoamerican peoples (by Sahagún, for instance), but Mexica propaganda seeking to explain their continued independence may have contributed to this reputation. The Yopi were skilled at crafting with gold and precious stones, and worshipped Xipe Totec and perhaps are responsible for bringing this cult to Tenochtitlan. Although divorce was permitted, the Yopi punished adultery by the offended spouse biting off the offender's nose upon the first infraction, and by stoning to death on the second infraction.

Tehuacalco is an archaeological site that was inhabited by the Yopi people.
