= Chontal language (Guerrero) =

Extinct language of Mexico

Guerrero Chontal
- Native to: Mexico
- Region: Guerrero
- Ethnicity: Chontal people (Guerrero)
- Extinct: after 1687
- Language family: unclassified

Language codes
- ISO 639-3: None (mis)

Guerrero Chontal (also called Chontal of Guerrero) is an unclassified language that was spoken in what is now the Mexican state of Guerrero during the prehispanic and early colonial periods. It is now extinct, and there is no existing description of this language.

Guerrero Chontal should not be confused with the unrelated Chontal Maya or Oaxaca Chontal languages, which are still spoken in other parts of Mexico. Chontal is a generic Nahuatl word for foreigner that was historically applied to several unrelated ethnic groups.

== Distribution ==
Guerrero Chontal was spoken in the northern region of the state of Guerrero, with a minor overlap into the adjoining portion of the State of Mexico. In the 16th century, Chontal was evidently a fairly widely spoken language, but was ignored by Spanish missionaries, despite smaller languages receiving some attention. Given that the Chontal region was home to many people bilingual in both Chontal and Nahuatl, the missionaries were perhaps able to rely on the latter language in order to communicate and preach their religion, without needing to know Chontal. Indeed, Nahuatl had been widely used as a lingua franca by the Chontal elite since at least the Aztec conquests.

== Classification ==
Due to the lack of data, Guerrero Chontal is unclassifiable. One 16th-century report related it to Tuxtec, another unclassified language spoken to the east, in towns such as Iguala, Mayanalan, Tlalcozauhtitlan and Oapan. It has thus been suggested that Chontal and Tuxtec could have been related, or even dialects of the same language. However, a different source mentioned that Tuxtec was once spoken in Ixcateopan, but by 1579 Chontal had replaced it.

Donald Brand opined that Chontal was probably an Oto-Manguean language.

== Features ==
A 16th-century report mentioned that Guerrero Chontal was "spoken in the throat" and that "it wasn't written because it wasn't pronounced".

Una Canger, suggesting the existence of a Chontal substrate in Coatepec Nahuatl, draws from features in the latter in order to hypothesize that Chontal featured a phonemic glottal stop but did not allow it word-finally, featured a vowel length distinction, was not strongly polysynthetic, and conjugated verbs by subject.
