= Cocula, Guerrero =

Town in the Mexican state of Guerrero

Cocula
- Municipal seat and town
- Location in Mexico Cocula (Mexico)
- Coordinates: 18°14′N 99°40′W
- Country: Mexico
- State: Guerrero
- Municipality: Cocula
- Time zone: UTC-6 (Zona Centro)

Cocula is a town in the Mexican state of Guerrero. It is the municipal seat for Cocula Municipality, Guerrero.

== See also ==
- Municipalities of Guerrero
