= 36th federal electoral district of the State of Mexico =

Federal electoral district of Mexico

State of Mexico's 36th
- Electoral district of the Chamber of Deputies of Mexico

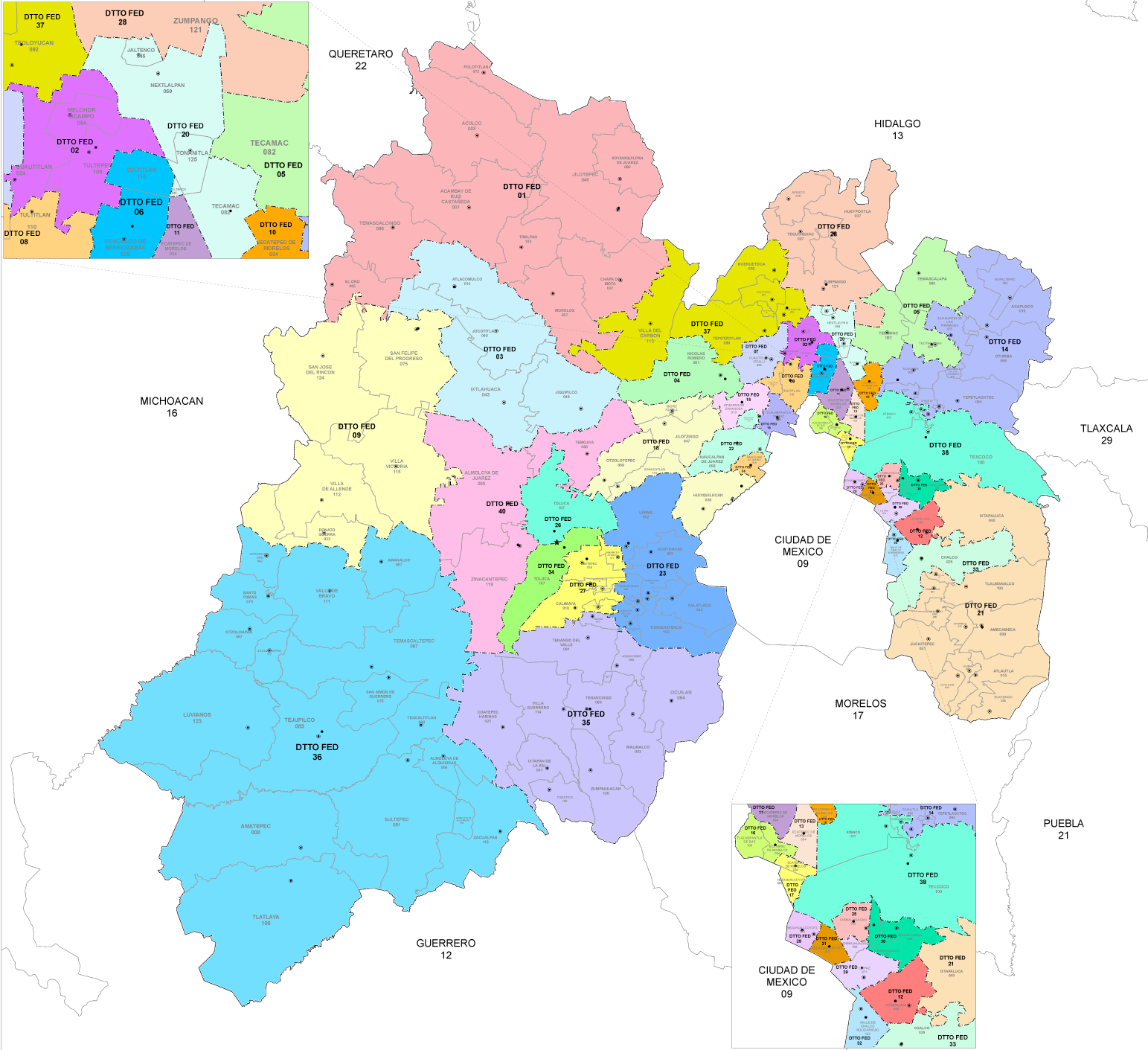
- State of Mexico's districts since 2023

Incumbent
- Member: Juan Carlos Varela
- Party: ▌Morena
- Congress: 66th (2024–2027)

District
- State: State of Mexico
- Head town: Tejupilco de Hidalgo
- Coordinates: 18°54′N 100°09′W
- Covers: 16 municipalities: Almoloya de Alquisiras, Amanalco, Amatepec, Ixtapan del Oro, Luvianos, Otzoloapan, San Simón de Guerrero, Santo Tomás, Sultepec, Tejupilco, Temascaltepec, Texcaltitlán, Tlatlaya, Valle de Bravo, Zacazonapan, Zacualpan
- PR region: Fifth
- Precincts: 281
- Population: 390,046 (2020 census)

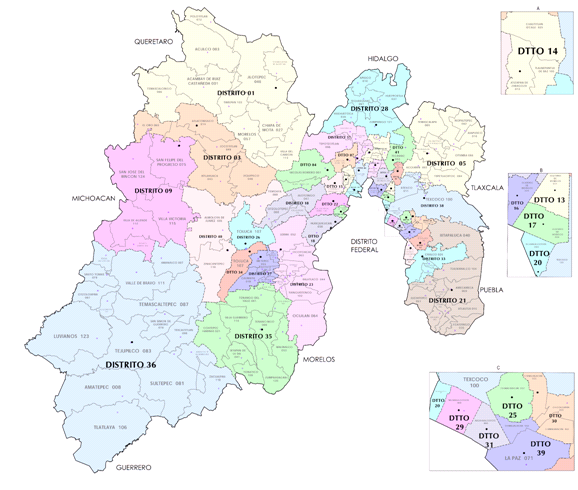
2017–2022 districting scheme

The 36th federal electoral district of the State of Mexico (Spanish: Distrito electoral federal 36 del Estado de México) is one of the 300 electoral districts into which Mexico is divided for elections to the federal Chamber of Deputies and one of 40 such districts in the State of Mexico.

It elects one deputy to the lower house of Congress for each three-year legislative session by means of the first-past-the-post system. Votes cast in the district also count towards the calculation of proportional representation ("plurinominal") deputies elected from the fifth region.

The 35th and 36th districts were created by the Federal Electoral Institute's 1996 redistricting process and were first contested in the 1997 mid-term election.

The current member for the district, elected in the 2024 general election, is Juan Carlos Varela Domínguez of the National Regeneration Movement (Morena).

== District territory ==
Under the 2023 districting plan adopted by the National Electoral Institute (INE), which is to be used for the 2024, 2027 and 2030 federal elections, the 36th district is located in the south-west corner of the state and covers 281 electoral precincts (secciones electorales) across 16 of its 125 municipalities:

- Almoloya de Alquisiras, Amanalco, Amatepec, Ixtapan del Oro, Luvianos, Otzoloapan, San Simón de Guerrero, Santo Tomás, Sultepec, Tejupilco, Temascaltepec, Texcaltitlán, Tlatlaya, Valle de Bravo, Zacazonapan and Zacualpan.

The district's head town (cabecera distrital), where results from individual polling stations are gathered together and tallied, is the city of Tejupilco de Hidalgo. In the 2020 census, the district reported a total population of 390,046.

== Previous districting schemes ==
Evolution of electoral district numbers
	1974	1978	1996	2005	2017	2023
State of Mexico	15	34	36	40	41	40
Chamber of Deputies	196	300				

Under the previous districting plans enacted by the INE and its predecessors, the 36th district was situated as follows:

2017–2022

The same sixteen municipalities as in the 2023 plan. The head town was at Tejupilco de Hidalgo.

2005–2017

Sixteen municipalities in the same part of the state: the same group as in the later plans, but without Ixtapan del Oro and instead including Coatepec Harinas. The head town was at Tejupilco de Hidalgo.

1996–2005

Thirteen municipalities in the same region of the state: Almoloya de Alquisiras, Amatepec, Coatepec Harinas, Ixtapan de la Sal, Luvianos, San Simón de Guerrero, Sultepec, Tejupilco, Texcaltitlán, Tlatlaya, Tonatico, Villa Guerrero and Zacualpan. The head town was at Tejupilco de Hidalgo.

== Deputies returned to Congress ==
(Mexico) National parties
- Current
- PAN
- PRI
- PT
- PVEM
- MC
- Morena
- PAZ
- Somos
- Defunct or local only
- PLM
- PNR
- PRM
- PNM
- PP
- PPS
- PARM
- PFCRN
- CON
- PANAL
- PSD
- PES
- PES
- PRD

State of Mexico's 36th district
Election	Deputy	Party	Term	Legislature
1997	Guillermo Santín Castañeda	Institutional Revolutionary Party	1997–2000	57th Congress
2000	Enrique Martínez Orta Flores	Institutional Revolutionary Party	2000–2003	58th Congress
2003	José Eduviges Nava Altamirano	Institutional Revolutionary Party	2003–2006	59th Congress
2006	Isael Villa Villa	Institutional Revolutionary Party	2006–2009	60th Congress
2009	Guillermina Casique Vences	Institutional Revolutionary Party	2009–2012	61st Congress
2012	Noé Barrueta Barón	Institutional Revolutionary Party	2012–2015	62nd Congress
2015	Iveth Bernal Casique	Institutional Revolutionary Party	2015–2018	63rd Congress
2018	Cruz Roa Sánchez	Institutional Revolutionary Party	2018–2021	64th Congress
2021	Jazmín Jaimes Albarrán	Institutional Revolutionary Party	2021–2024	65th Congress
2024	Juan Carlos Varela Domínguez	National Regeneration Movement	2024–2027	66th Congress

== Presidential elections ==
State of Mexico's 36th district
Election	District won by	Party or coalition	%
2018	Andrés Manuel López Obrador	Juntos Haremos Historia	45.5015
2024	Claudia Sheinbaum Pardo	Sigamos Haciendo Historia	60.3138
