= Valle de Bravo Region =

Region of Mexico

Region I (Spanish: Región 1. Valle de Bravo) is an intrastate region within the State of Mexico, one of 16. It borders the states of Michoacán in the west corner of the state. The region comprises thirteen municipalities: Amanalco, Otzoloapan, Valle de Bravo, Santo Tomás, Zacazonapan. It is largely rural.

== Municipalities ==
- Amanalco
- Ixtapan del Oro
- Otzoloapan
- Santo Tomás
- Valle de Bravo
- Zacazonapan
