= Tierra Caliente (Mexico) =

Cultural region of Mexico

- Geographical region
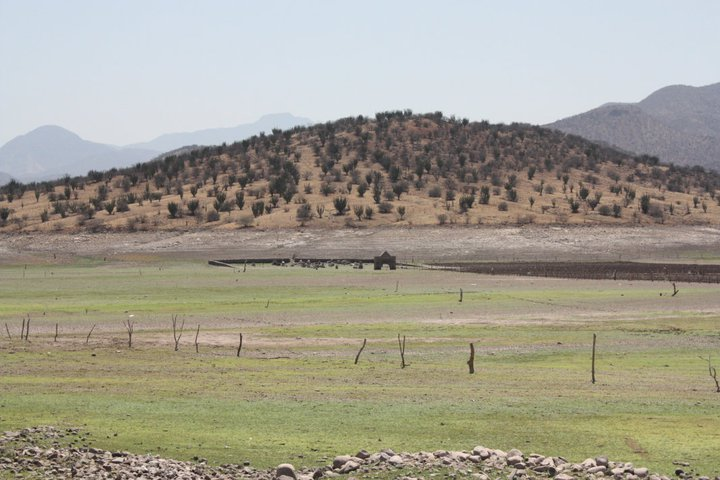
- Churumuco, a central area of the Tierra Caliente

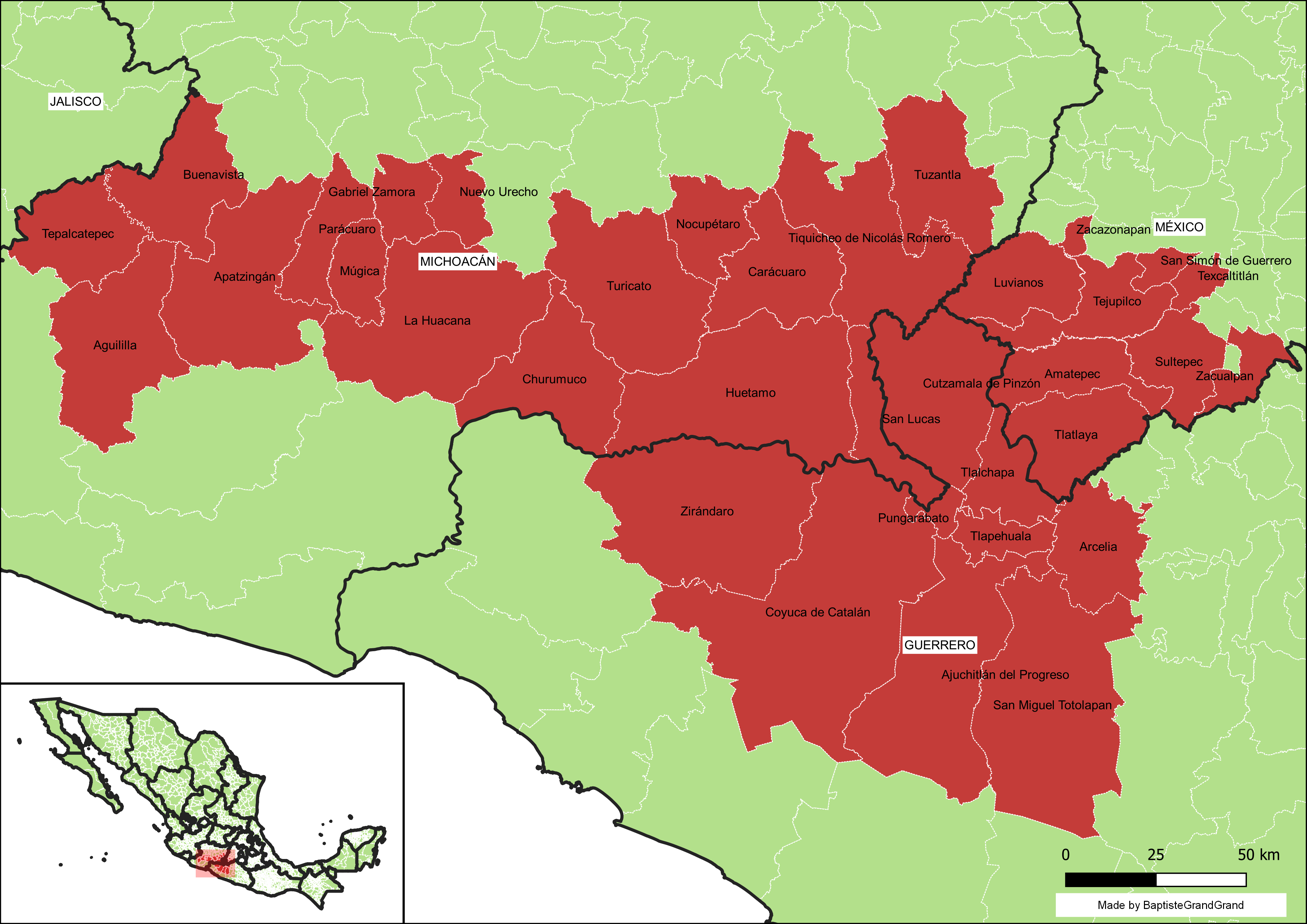
- Location of Tierra Caliente in Mexico
- Country: Mexico
- Largest city: Apatzingán
- States: State of Mexico, Guerrero, Michoacán

Population (2020)
  - Total: 961,981

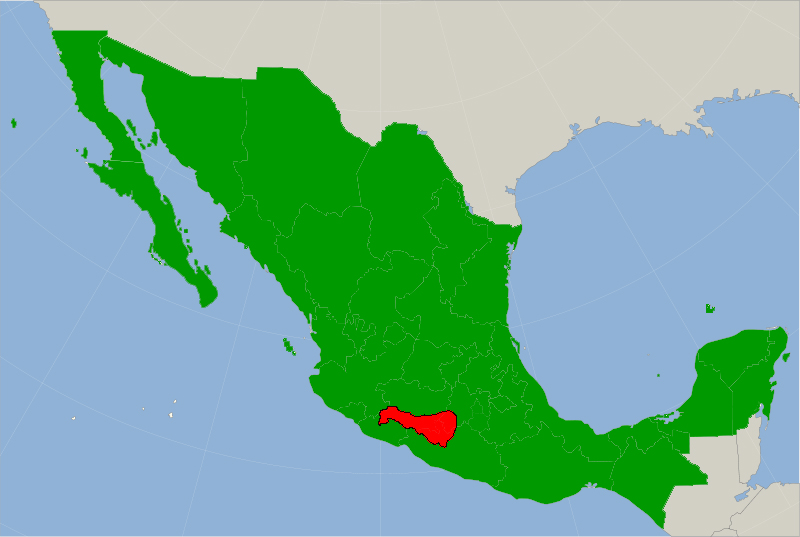
Location in Michoacán and Guerrero

Tierra Caliente (Spanish for Hot Land) is a cultural and geographical region in southern Mexico that comprises some low-elevation areas of the states of Michoacán, Guerrero and Mexico. As the name suggests, the region is characterized by a hot climate. The overall precipitation is also low - around 600 mm/year, but can be as low as 400 mm in some low-lying areas of Michoacán and Guerrero.

== Municipalities ==
=== Guerrero ===
Name	Municipal seat
Ajuchitlán del Progreso	Ajuchitlán
Arcelia	Arcelia
Coyuca de Catalán	Coyuca de Catalán
Cutzamala de Pinzón	Cutzamala de Pinzón
San Miguel Totolapan	San Miguel Totolapan
Tlalchapa	Tlalchapa
Tlapehuala	Tlapehuala
Zirándaro	Zirándaro de los Chávez
Ciudad Altamirano	Pungarabato

=== State of Mexico (Edomex) ===
Name	Municipal seat
Amatepec	Amatepec
Luvianos	Villa Luvianos
Sultepec	Sultepec de Pedro Ascencio de Alquisiras
Tejupilco	Tejupilco de Hidalgo
Tlatlaya	Tlatlaya
Almoloya de Alquisiras	Almoloya de Alquisiras

Michoacán:

- Tepalcatepec
- Churumuco de Morelos
- San Lucas
- Gabriel Zamora
- Nueva Italia
- Apatzingan
- Aguililla
- Tingambato
- Tuzantla
- Susupuato de Guerrero
- Nocupétaro
- Carácuaro
- Tiquicheo
- Huetamo de Nuñez

== Gallery ==
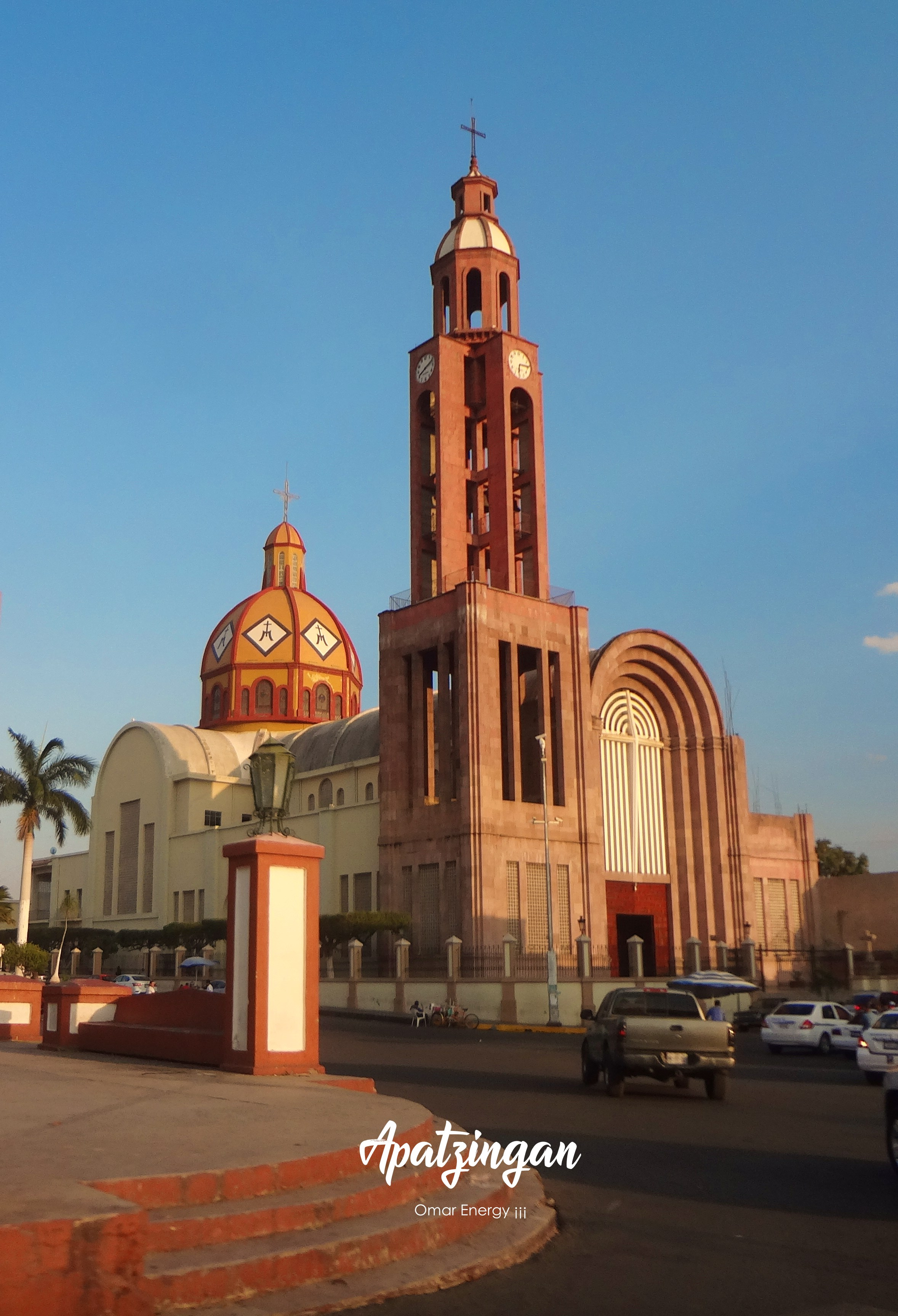
:Catedral de Apatzingán

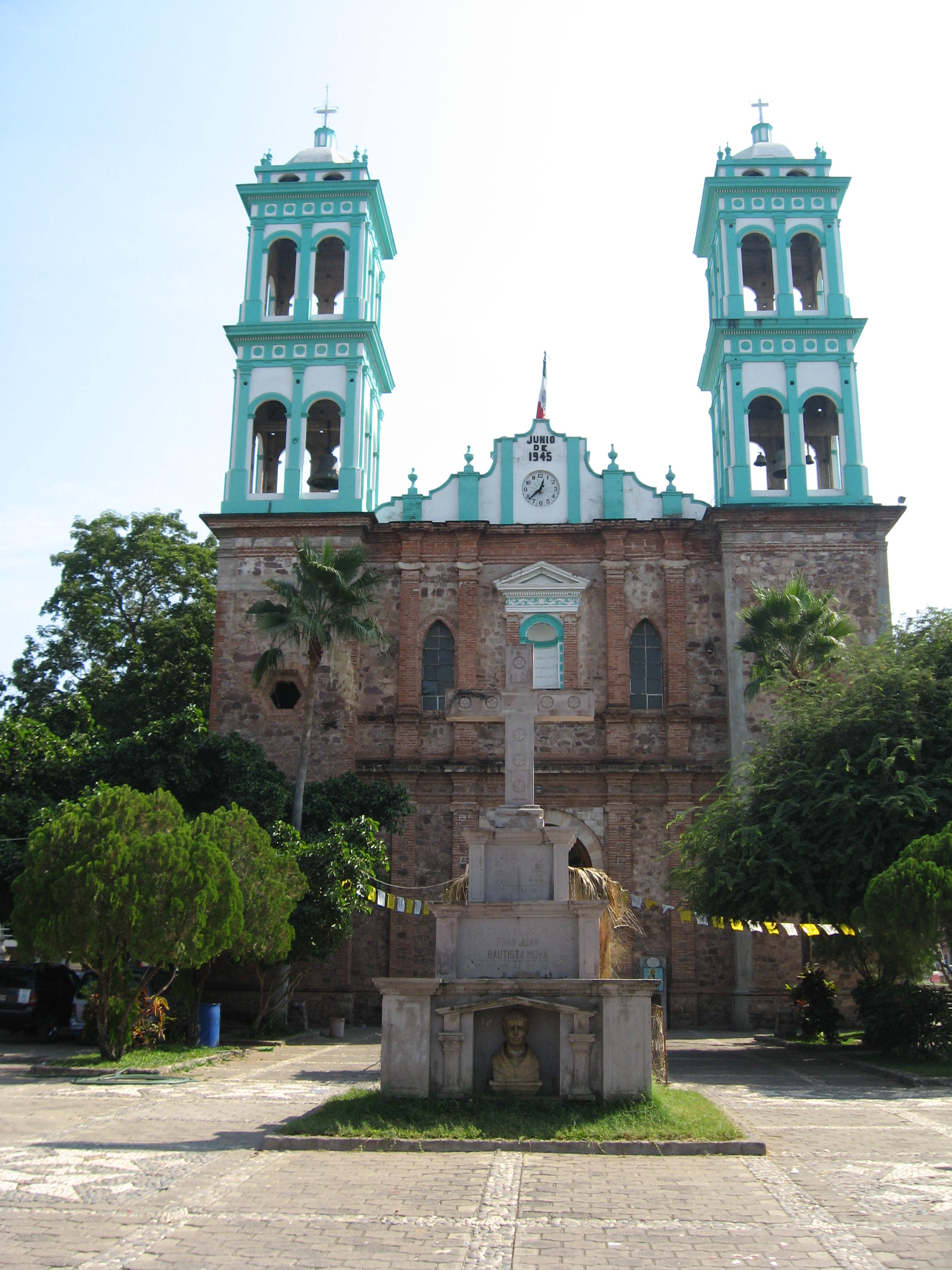
Catedral de San Juan Bautista Pungarabato

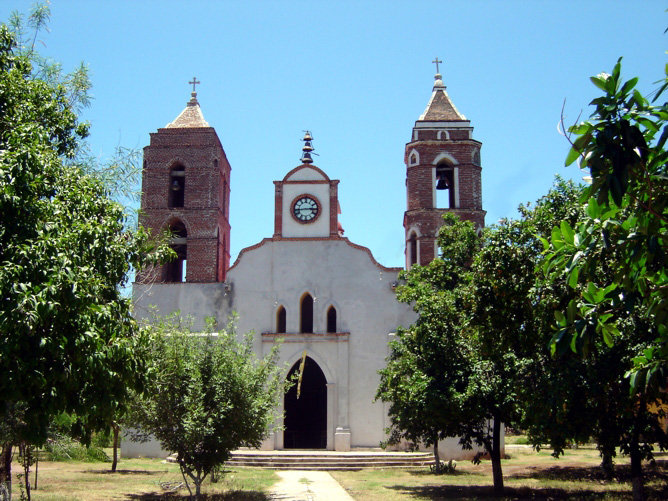
Iglesia de Zirándaro

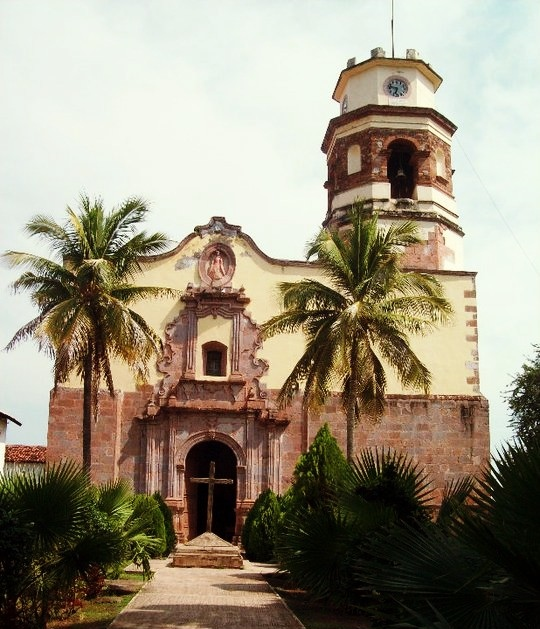
Iglesia de Cutzamala de Pinzón

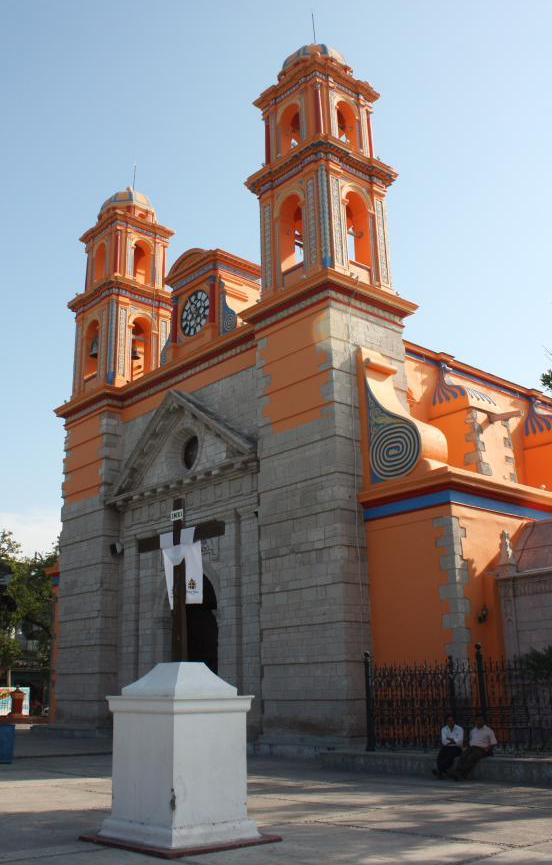
Iglesia de San Francisco de Asís

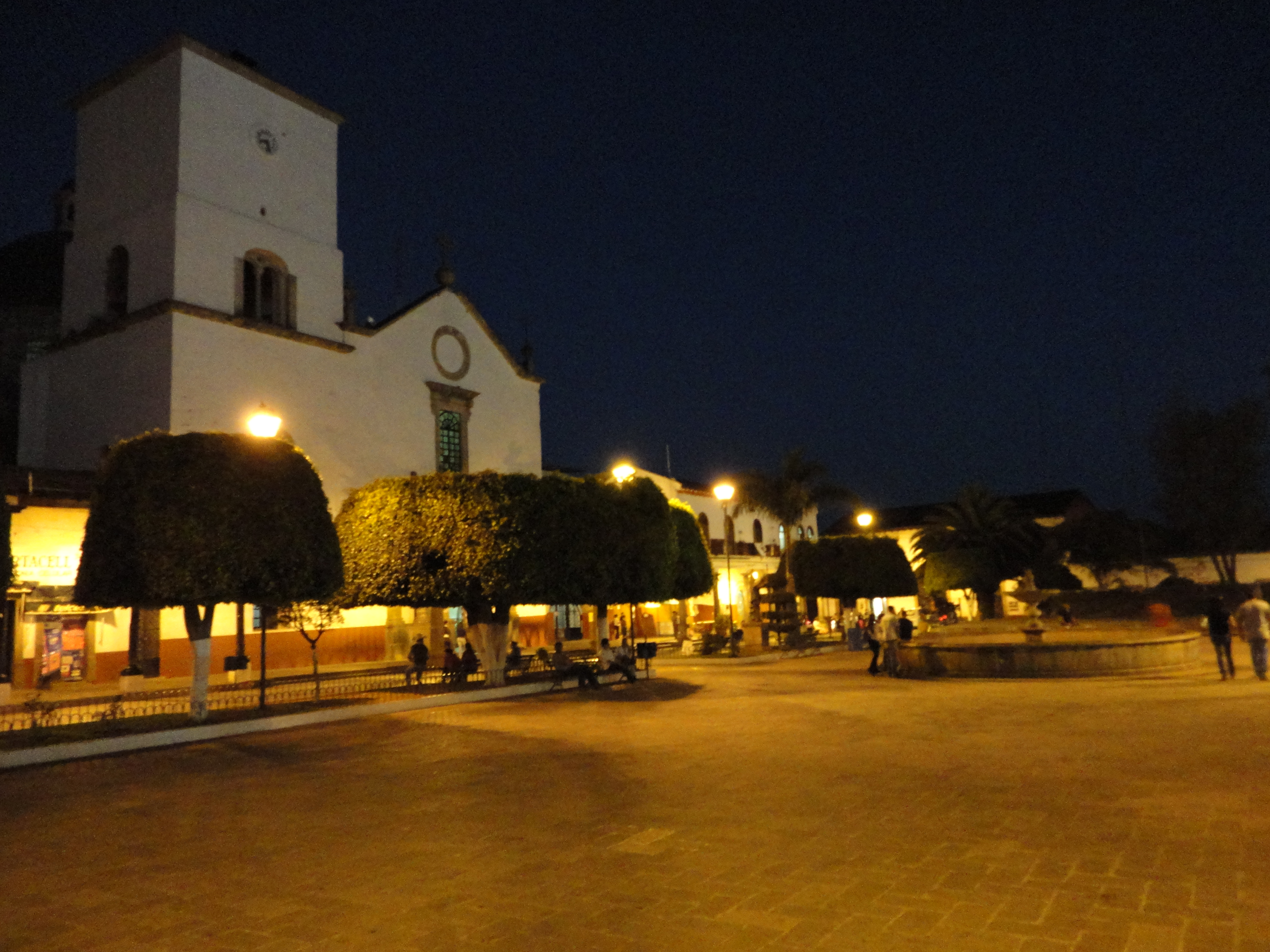
Tacámbaro de Codallos

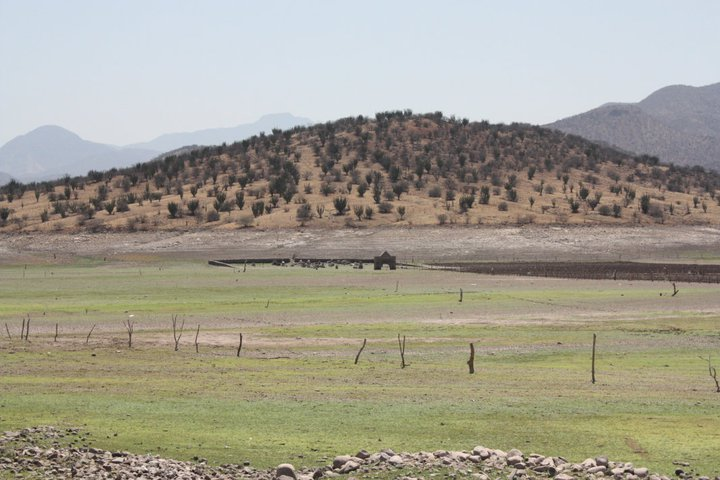
Churumuco viejo
