= Luvianos =

- Town & Municipality
- Location within Mexico Location within State of Mexico
- Coordinates: 18°55′12″N 100°17′54″W
- Country: Mexico
- State: State of Mexico
- Municipal Status: 2000

Government
  - Municipal President: Anibal Martinez (2015-present)
- Elevation (of seat): 1,130 m (3,710 ft)

Population (2005) Municipality
  - Municipality: 28,215
  - Seat: 8,146
- Time zone: UTC-6 (Central)
- Postal code (of seat): 51440
- Website: (in Spanish) http://www.luvianos.gob.mx/

Luvianos is a small town and municipality located in the southwest of the State of Mexico. It gained municipal status in 2000. People can access Luvianos by driving Federal Road 134 south from Toluca, and then take a detour about 25 minutes north of Tejupilco. The name is derived from a hacienda what was established during colonial times.

== The town ==
The town has a total population of 8,146 as of 2005.

One of the popular tourists destinations in Luvianos is the water park "Las Lomas". Many travel for hours to visit this attraction.

Every Tuesday locals and visitors gather around the central business district for shopping at the Plaza.

Like many towns in the region, Luvianos does not have an airport and is therefore accessible only via terrestrial means.

== The municipality ==
The formation of this municipality was long in coming. Residents of the Luvianos ranch area petitioned for such status as early as 1874, again in 1974 but the petition was not granted until it was presented yet again in 2000. The first municipal president did not take power until 2003.

As municipal seat, the town of Luvianos has governing jurisdiction over 235 communities, which are organized into 70 delegations. The municipality encompasses 702.129 km^{2} and is bordered by the states of Michoacán to the west and Guerrero to the south, and by the municipalities of Otzoloapan, Zacazonapan, Temascaltepec and Tejupilco. The highest elevations, up to 1,900 meters are in the Sierra de Nanchititla. The Rio de Acatitlan river forms its northern border. Total population of the municipality is 28,213 as of 2005.

Luvianos, like some nearby towns, are considered to located in the Tierra Caliente.

=== Communities of the municipality of Luvianos ===
Agua Colorada, El Aguacate, Alborejo (Puerto Alborejo), La Angostura Dos, La Angostura Uno (Cerro de la Angostura Uno), Las Anonas, La Antena (Nariz del Cerro), Arrayán, Los Arrayanes, Los Arrayanes (Los Arrayanes Verdes), Arroyo Seco, Avellaneda, Los Bancos (1), Los Bancos (2), Los Bancos (2), Barranca del Fraile, El Brasil, Buenavista, Caja de Agua (1), Caja de Agua (2), Calabazos (Las Pilas), Calaveras, La Camelina, El Campanario, La Candelaria, La Canoa, Capire, El Capire, El Capire de Acatitlán, Capulín Chico, Carbajales, Carrizal, El Carrizal, Cañada del Campanario, Cañadas de Nanchititla, Ceiba Obscura (Peña del Águila), Cerro de Castelanes, Cerro de la Culebra, Cerro del Agua, Cerro del Venado (Comunidad del Pueblito), El Cerro, La Chaqueta, Ciprianes, El Cirián de Hermiltepec, Colcomeca, Corral del Barro, Corral Nuevo, El Crucillo, Cruz de Clavos, Cruz de Piedra. Cuadrilla de Benítez, Cuadrilla de Sánchez, Cuadrilla de Lopez, Cuahuilote, Cuahuilotes (Cuajilotes), Los Curindales, La Estancia de Nanchititla (La Estancia), Estancia Grande (San José Estancia Grande), El Estanco, Gabazos (El Bagaso), Guayabos (El Guayabo), Hermiltepec (Peña Blanca), Hilamache, Hormigueros, El Huizache, Huiztepec, Iglesia Vieja, Jalpan, Jocoleche, La Laguna (1), La Laguna (2), Las Lajas, Las Lajitas, El Limón (1), El Limón (2), Los Llanitos, Magadán, Majada de los Encinos(Majada de Encinos), El Mamey Acatitlán, Mango Solo, El Manguito, El Manguito (La Parotilla), Mesa Colorada, Mesa de los Espinos (Mesa de las Escobas), Mesa de Nietos, Mesa del Capulín (Mesa de los Nanches), Mesa la Trampa, La Mesa, La Minita, Monte Verde, El Naranjito, El Naranjo, El Naranjo de San Isidro (El Naranjo Primero), Navarrete, Los Ocotes, Ojo de Agua, El Ojo de Agua, Ojo de Agua-Palo Gordo, La Palma, Las Palmas, Palo Gordo, Palo Verde, Palos Prietos, El Paso de Vigas, Las Paredes, La Parota, Las Parotas, Paso de la Arena, Paso del Agua (Cristo Rey), Los Pericones (Ranchería los Pericones), Peña Calva, El Pie de la Loma, Piedra Colorada, Piedra Grande, Los Pinzanes (1), Los Pinzanes (2), Los Piñones (El Sauz), Plan de Chihuahua, El Plátano, Playa el Guayabo, Potrero de Palmarillos, Potrero Vallecitos (El Potrero), El Pueblito (1), El Pueblito (2), El Pueblito (3), Puerta de Golpe, El Puerto de la Sosa, Puerto de los Duraznos, Puerto de los Terreros, Puerto de los Zacatones, Puerto del Higo, Puerto del Salitre, Puerto la Estancia, Pungarancho, El Ranchito (El Limoncito), Rancho Viejo, El Reparo de Nanchititla (El Reparo), Rincón Cruz de Clavos, Rincón de Alambre, Rincón de Arrayanes, Rincón de Ciprianes, Rincón de González, Rincón de Martínez, Rincón de Rodríguez, Rincón de San Lucas, Rincón de Vargas, Rincón del Hilamache, Rincón del Naranjo la Presa, El Rincón Piedra Grande, Río Frío Estancia Grande, El Rodeo, Salitre de Rodríguez, Salitre del Puente (Puente del Salitre), Salitre Piedra Grande, Salitrillo, El Salto de San Jerónimo, San Antonio Luvianos (San Antonio), San Juan Acatitlán (Acatitlán), San Nicolás, San Sebastián (Rincón de San Sebastián), San Simón Piedra Grande (San Simón), Santa Cruz, Santa Rosa-Estancia Grande, Santa Rosa-Hermiltepec, Sauz-Palo Gordo (El Sauz), Sesteadero, Sesteadero de Arriba, El Tanque, El Tecuán, Los Tejocotes, Los Tequereques, Toma de Agua, La Toma, Tremesinos, Tres Encinos, Las Trojas, Trojes, La Unidad (Los Ciruelos)and Vallecitos-Hermiltepec (Vallecito)
