= Vences =

Vences is a surname. Notable people with the surname include:

- Guillermina Casique Vences (born 1961), Mexican politician
- Miguel Vences (born 1969), German herpetologist and evolutionary biologist

== See also ==
- Vence, a French commune
