= Noé Barrueta =

Mexican politician

- Born: 27 December 1971 (age 54); Temascaltepec, State of Mexico, Mexico
- Occupation: Politician
- Political party: PRI

Noé Barrueta Barón (born 27 December 1971) is a Mexican politician affiliated with the Institutional Revolutionary Party (PRI). In the 2012 general election he was elected to the Chamber of Deputies to represent the State of Mexico's 36th district during the 62nd session of Congress.
