= Texcaltitlán =

- Town & Municipality
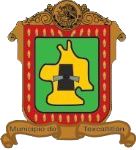
- Coat of arms

- Location within State of Mexico Location within Mexico
- Coordinates: 18°55′47″N 99°56′14″W
- Country: Mexico
- State: State of Mexico
- Founded: before 1776
- Municipal Status: 1861

Government
  - Municipal President: Javier Lujano Huerta

Area
  - Land: 142.45 km^{2} (55.00 sq mi)
- Elevation (of seat): 2,400 m (7,900 ft)

Population (2005) Municipality
  - Municipality: 2,361
  - Seat: 15,824
- Time zone: UTC-6 (Central (US Central))
- Postal code (of seat): 51670
- Website: texcaltitlan.gob.mx (in Spanish)

Texcaltitlán is a town and a municipality of the State of Mexico in Mexico. It is located 65 km from Toluca on the high plains south of the Nevado de Toluca volcano. The name Texcaltitlán comes from the Nahuatl: texcalli = "rock"; titla= "among", with the complete meaning as "among rocks".

== The town ==
The area now known as Texcaltitlán was settled at least as early as 800 AD, possibly as early as 300AD. It was dominated by the Teotihuacán civilization, then by the Toltecs and lastly, between 1250 and 1520 it was dominated by the Aztecs. During the late Aztec Empire, Texcaltitlán was an important town and was the head of the towns of Temascaltepec, Tejupilco, and Tuzantla, as well as a number of communities that no longer exist such as Ciutepeque, Ocelotequepue, Yexvaca, Cuahtepeque, Oztotitipac, Tlapatlapan and Melamamaloya. After the Spanish Conquest, the area came under the governorship of Don Antonio de Caicedo. In the 18th century, the town suffered from outbreaks of the black plague leading the Franciscans to build their church in nearby San Francisco Coaxusco, rather than in the town itself in 1775. The first church built in the town was built in 1789. During the Mexican Revolution, the town was sacked various times, with the principal targets being businesses, especially those tied to the nearby city of Toluca. Texcaltitlán's history for the rest of the 20th century consists of the modernization of its infrastructure and increasing economic ties with Toluca, the state capital.

As of 2005, the town had a population of 2,361 people and is situated at an altitude of 2,400 meters above sea level. The church in the town of Texcaltitlán is surrounded by black battlements dating from the eighteenth century and wooden baroque-style altarpieces that are in the chapels of the communities of Santa Maria and San Francisco. Tuesday is market day in Texcaltitlán and is one of the oldest traditions of the municipality, which has been preserved from the time of the first settlers. Now it is one of the biggest in the State of Mexico.

== The municipality ==
As municipal seat, the town of Texcaltitlán has governing jurisdiction over the following communities: Acatitlán, Arroyo Seco, Carbajal, El Chapaneal, Chiquiuntepec (El Rincón, Rincón Castañeda), Gavia Chica, Hueyatenco, Jesús del Monte, Llano Grande, Noxtepec, Palmillas, San Agustín, San Francisco, San Miguel, Santa María, Texcapilla, Tlacotepec, Venta Morales (El Pedregal), Ejido Venta Morales (La Laguna), Yuytepec, Palo Amarillo, Las Tablas (Las Tablas San José), Rastrojo Largo, Las Paredes, Agua del Trébol, Ojo de Agua, Nueva Santa María, San José, Las Lágrimas, El Agostadero, Los Lirios and La Angostura.

The current municipality was founded in 1861 and borders the municipalities of Temascaltepec, Sultepec, Almoloya de Alquisiras, Coatepec Harinas, Tejupilco and San Simón de Guerrero. It has a territory of 142.45 km^{2}. The total municipal population was 15,824 as of 2005.

=== Climate ===
Climate data for Aiwo District
Month	Jan	Feb	Mar	Apr	May	Jun	Jul	Aug	Sep	Oct	Nov	Dec	Year
Mean daily maximum °C (°F)	30 (86)	30 (86)	30 (86)	30 (86)	30 (86)	30 (86)	30 (86)	30 (86)	30 (86)	31 (87)	31 (87)	30 (86)	30 (86)
Mean daily minimum °C (°F)	24 (75)	24 (75)	24 (75)	24 (75)	25 (77)	25 (77)	24 (75)	24 (75)	24 (75)	25 (77)	25 (77)	24 (75)	24 (75)
Average precipitation mm (inches)	270 (10.7)	240 (9.4)	190 (7.5)	170 (6.5)	120 (4.8)	120 (4.9)	160 (6.4)	150 (5.9)	120 (4.8)	110 (4.4)	150 (5.8)	240 (9.5)	2,040 (80.5)
Source: Weatherbase
