= Isael Villa Villa =

Mexican politician

- Born: 5 April 1956; State of Mexico, Mexico
- Died: 7 February 2021 (aged 64)
- Occupation: Politician
- Political party: PRI

Isael Villa Villa (5 April 1956 – 7 February 2021) was a Mexican politician affiliated with the Institutional Revolutionary Party (PRI).

In 1996 he was elected to a three-year term in the Congress of the State of Mexico. In the 2006 general election he was elected to the Chamber of Deputies to represent the State of Mexico's 36th district during the 60th session of Congress.

In 2009–2012 he served as the municipal president of Tejupilco, State of Mexico.

Villa died from COVID-19 in 2021.
