= José Eduviges Nava Altamirano =

Mexican lawyer and politician

Municipal president of Zacualpan, State of Mexico
- In office 2009–2011

Federal deputy for the State of Mexico's 36th district
- In office 2003–2006

Municipal president of Zacualpan, State of Mexico
- In office 2000–2003

Personal details
- Born: 5 November 1954; Zacualpan, State of Mexico, Mexico
- Died: 20 August 2011 (aged 56); Teloloapan, Guerrero, Mexico (Body found)
- Political party: PRI, PT
- Occupation: Lawyer, politician

José Eduviges Nava Altamirano (5 November 1954 – 19/20 August 2011) was a Mexican lawyer and politician. At different times he was affiliated with both the Institutional Revolutionary Party (PRI) and the Labour Party (PT). He was murdered by drug traffickers in 2011 while serving as the mayor of his home town.

== Biography ==
Nava Altamirano was born in Zacualpan, State of Mexico, in 1954. He earned a law degree from the Autonomous University of the State of Mexico (UAEM), where he later taught.

In 2000 he was elected to a three-year term as the municipal president of Zacualpan. In the 2003 federal mid-terms, he was elected to the Chamber of Deputies on the PRI ticket to represent the State of Mexico's 36th district during the 59th session of Congress.

He was re-elected municipal president of Zacualpan for the 2009–2012 term, representing a coalition between the PT and Convergencia.

On 19 August 2011, Nava Altamirano was attacked by a group of armed men while attending a meeting of the local water committee in Zacualpan; a member of his security detailed was killed in the firefight, and four other people were injured. The assailants initially abducted a member of the water committee, believing him to be the mayor; after realising their mistake, they returned for Nava Altamirano and took him with them when they left. His body was found the following day in the municipality of Teloloapan, Guerrero.

His killer, whose drug trafficking and cultivation activities Nava Altamirano had resisted while in office, was sentenced to a 190-year prison term in 2018.
