= Ixtapan Region =

Region I (Spanish: Región 1. Ixtapan) is an intrastate region within the State of Mexico, one of 16. It borders the states of Morelos and Guerrero in the south corner of the state. The region comprises thirteen municipalities: Villa Guerrero, Malinalco, Ixtapan de la Sal, Coatepec Harinas. It is largely rural.

== Municipalities ==
- Malinalco
- Ocuilan
