= Raíces, Zinacantepec =

Village in Mexico

Coordinates: 19.1614°N 99.8053°W

Raíces
- Town
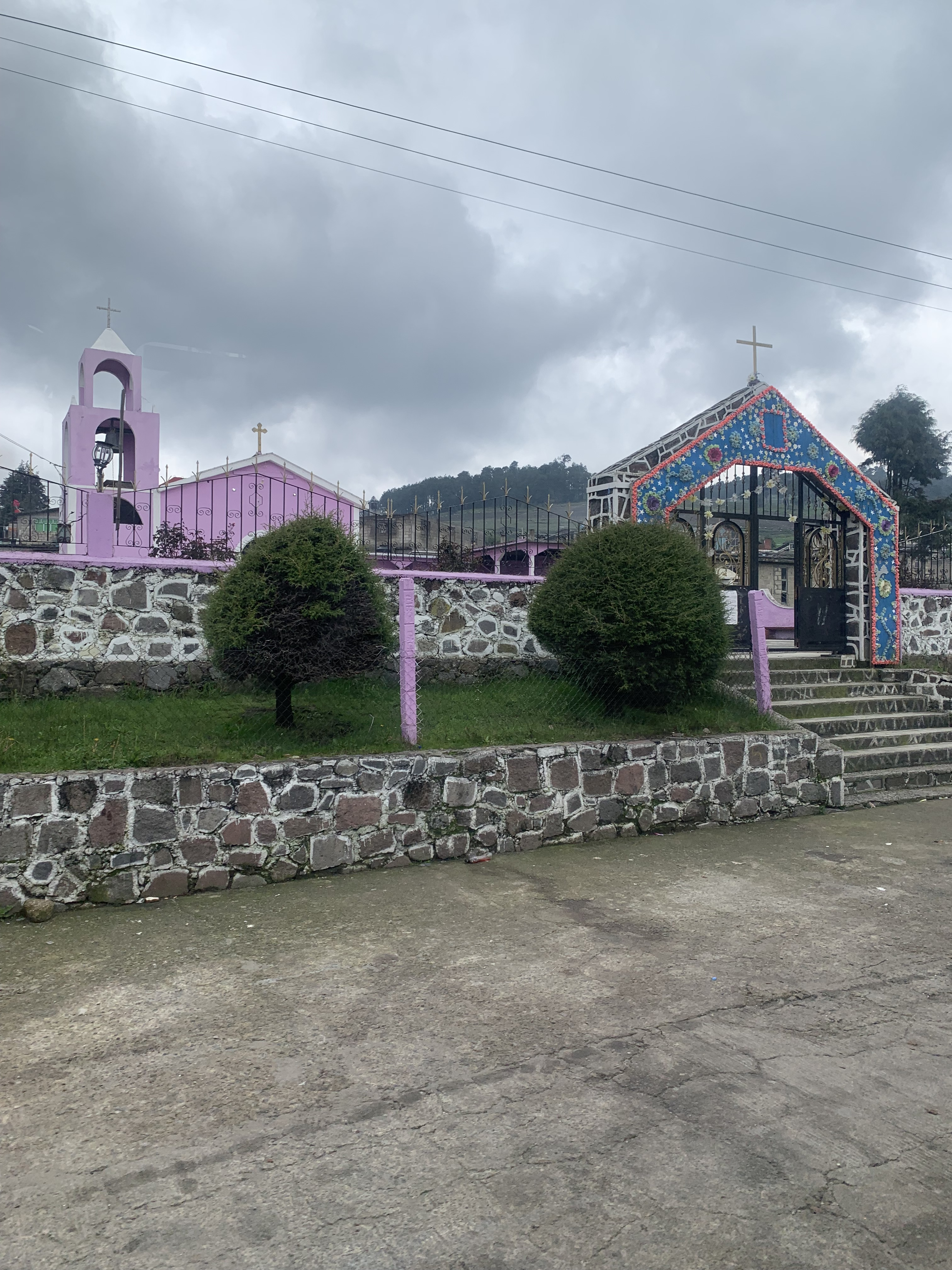
- Church in Raíces
- Interactive map of Raíces
- Country: Mexico Mexico
- State: State of Mexico
- Municipality: Zinacantepec
- Elevation: 3,531 m (11,585 ft)

Population (2020)
  - Total: 571
- Time zone: UTC-6 (Zona Centro)

Raíces is a Mexican village on the slopes of the volcano Nevado de Toluca in the Municipio of Zinacantepec, Estado de México at the altitude of 3,531 metres (11,584 ft). The population of the village is around 500 people. Raices has monsoon-influenced cold subtropical highland (Cwc) climate . It is the highest settlement in North America.
