= Santo Tomás Municipality =

Santo Tomás
- Municipality
- Location within Mexico
- Coordinates: 19°10′54″N 100°15′32″W
- Country: Mexico
- State: Mexico State
- Municipal seat: Santo Tomás de los Plátanos
- Founded: 1870

Government
  - Municipal President: Maria Clotilde García Enríquez
- Elevation: 1,380 m (4,530 ft)

Population (2005)Municipality
  - Total: 8,888
  - Seat: 2,823
- Time zone: UTC-6 (Central (US Central))
- Postal code: 51100

Santo Tomás is one of 125 municipalities in the State of Mexico. The municipal seat is the town of Santo Tomás de los Plátanos located in the center-west of Mexico State, in Mexico. It is approximately 185 km from Mexico City, and 107 km from Toluca.

== The municipality ==
As municipal seat, Santo Tomás de los Plátanos has governing jurisdiction over the following communities: San José Barbechos (Los Barbechos), Cieneguillas, La Laguna, El Ocotal, Potrero de Abajo (Colonia Guadalupe), Potrero de Arriba (La Ceiba), Ojo de Agua, Rincón Grande, Salitre de Cal (El Zapote), Salitre Terreros, San Miguel San de Mialma, San Pedro el Chico, San Pedro el Grande, San Pedro Ixtapantongo (Ixtapantongo), Santa Bárbara, Poblado de Santo Tomás (El Puerto San Isidro), Tacuitapan, Pueblo Viejo, Rincón Vivero (El Maracaná), El Llano, Las Canoas, El Jocoyol (San José el Jocoyol), El Salitre Bramador, El Aguacate, El Anono, Potrero de Abajo (Granadillo), El Sifón, Las Fincas, El Pedregal, Rincón Chico, Los Nogales, El Aguacate, El Plan, and Frontón Vivero.

It has a territorial extension of 110.91 square kilometers, and the population total for the municipality in 2005 was 8,888. It borders with the municipalities of Ixtapan del Oro, Valle de Bravo and Otzoloapan, as well as the state of Michoacán to the west.

The climate of Santo Tomás de los Platanos is sub tropical, with a rainy season in summer. The principal ecosystems consist of varied vegetation, from lowland jungle, temperate forest and agricultural land, although many forests here have suffered damage. The fruits that are grown in Santo Tomas de los Platanos are lemons, oranges, papayas, bananas, mango, coffee, sapodilla, guava, tamarind, and chayotes.

From 18 to 22 of December, the inhabitants of Santo Tomás celebrate the feast day of Saint Thomas the Apostle. On October 14, they celebrate the municipality's anniversary in 1870.

People of Santo Tomas produce stuffed animals, washcloths, tablecloths, and napkins. There are also bread bakeries. However, the primary economic activity is cattle-raising.

The typical food of Santo Tomas is turkey mole and tamales, which are served in family gatherings, weddings and quinceañeras.

Santo Tomás de los Plátanos is a popular location for tourism.

The seat has 46 schools, which are attended by 128 teachers. For the rest of the municipality, it depends on state and federal support for the other 24 communities to teach kindergarten, elementary school, and high school, with 2,081 students in 155 groups with 97 classrooms. There is a technical school in the Casa de Cultura (House of Culture) called “Santiago Santana Avalos”. In Santa Barbara, there is televised high school for the students of that area. The illiteracy rate is about 18.53%, which is considered high.
