= Zacualpan, State of Mexico =

Zacualpan Zacualpan
- Municipality
- Coat of arms
- Motto: A corner close to Heaven
- Location of the municipality in the State of Mexico

- Location in Mexico
- Coordinates: 18°43′17″N 99°49′30″W
- Country: Mexico
- State: Mexico (state)
- Municipal Seat: Zacualpan

Government
  - Municipal President: Fidel Figueroa Gómez (2019-2021)

Area
  - Total: 305.5 km^{2} (118.0 sq mi)
- Elevation: 2,710 m (8,890 ft)

Population (2010)
  - Total: 15,121
  - Density: 49.62/km^{2} (128.5/sq mi)
- Time zone: UTC-6 (Central Standard Time)
- ZIP code: 51800
- Area code: 721
- Website: www.facebook.com/zacualpanemexico

Zacualpan is one of the 125 municipalities in the State of Mexico in Mexico. Its municipal seat and largest settlement is the town of Zacualpan. It is located to the South of the state sharing a border with the State of Guerrero, 40 minutes from Ixtapan de la Sal, 1 hour and 50 minutes from the city of Toluca (the State's Capital), and 2 1/2 hours from Mexico City. The municipality covers an area of 305.5 km^{2} (1.35% of the area of the State of Mexico). Zacualpan is delimited to the North by the municipalities of Almoloya de Alquisiras and Coatepec Harinas, to the East by Ixtapan de la Sal and the municipality of Pilcaya (Guerrero), to the West by Sultepec, and to the South by Pilcaya, Tetipac, and Pedro Ascencio de Alquisiras (Guerrero).

The official name of the capital of the municipality is Real de Minas Zacualpan. The capital of the municipality was the first mining town established in the American Continent and mining is still an important economic activity in the life of its inhabitants. Due to its mining roots, its colonial buildings, and its landscape, Zacualpan was named "Pueblo con Encanto" (A Town with Charm) between 2006 and 2009.

The Spanish opened silver mines here around 1540.

As of 2005, the municipality had a total population of 13,800.

== Etymology ==
The name of Zacualpan comes from the Nahuatl words tzacualli (something that hides, stores, or conceals) and pan (on or above). The hieroglyph that represents the town's seal contains two figures: a 5-step pyramid and an open hand above it. In the Codex Mendoza, the meaning of this hieroglyph has been established as A place where valuable objects are stored.

== History ==
Zacualpan has a long history that goes back to the Pleistocene: the region was inhabited by large mammals such as mastodons, and perhaps some human nomads and hunters established their communities all around the southern region of the State of Mexico.

=== Prehispanic Period ===
The Couixcas arrived to the territory that nowadays is Zacualpan around the 12th century. When this group arrived there were already some settlements of Chontales, Matlatzincas, and Mazatecas. The migration of the Couixcas seems to have come from what nowadays is the state of Michoacan. For this reason, the oldest cities founded by the Couixca group are found to the west of the region: Sultepec is older than Zacualpan and Zacualpan is older than the towns founded towards the region of Malinalco. After the Couixcas settled in the region, they coexisted with the already settled groups (Matlazincas, Chontales, Mazatecos, etc.) but became the dominant group.

=== Colonial Period ===
The first contact between the Couixcas and the Spaniards occurred in November, 1519: Hernán Cortés had sent a delegation under Gonzalo de Umbria and a group of Spaniards and guides provided by Moctezuma Xocoyotzin to survey the existing gold mines in the domain of Zacatula, (Zacatotlan). The shortest known path between Mexico-Tenochtitlan and Zacatula crossed what nowadays is Zacualpan. This route had been used since the beginning of the establishment of Teotihuacan by the toltecas coming from Tula between VII and X AC. Its main purpose was commerce between the villages and cities of the valley of Mexico and the Pacific coast.

The second contact between the Couixcas and the Spaniards happened at the beginning of 1520, when Cortes demanded a tax in gold and silver from all villages through the use of native tax collectors accompanied by Spaniards. This tax was destined to be sent back to Spain then under the reign of Charles V. In 1521, the governors of Matlazingo, Malinalco, and Couixco asked Cortes to make them his vassals

Around that time, it was forbidden and under penalty of death to establish Spanish towns in close contact with indigenous towns. Each new Spanish town was named Real de Minas, and the purpose of these new towns was to exploit the mines found in the adjacent region. Under these conditions, the following Spanish towns were formed: San Esteban del Puerto, Nueva Villa Rica, Medellín Villa de Espíritu Santo, Real of San Lorenzo de Tetzicapan, Real of the Mines of Zacualpan, and the Real of San Salvador of Ayotuxco (also belonging to the mines of Zacualpan). Each Real had a nearby town inhabited by indigenous servants: the Real of Zacualpan had the town of Zotzocola; the Real of Ayotuxco had the town of Cuevillas, and the Real of Tetzicapan had the town of Coloxtitlan. The mines of Zacualpan were worked by indigenous slaves, African slaves, and indigenous workers that were forced to pay the taxes imposed by the Spaniards through their work.

In 1536, the King Charles V sent a group of German experts in mining techniques and metallurgy from the Fugger dynasty with the objective of teaching the Spaniards the newest mining and metallurgy techniques. These experts produced the first alloy of silver minerals in the Hacienda of Nombre de Dios. The first alloy haciendas where established in Zacualpan in 1562.

=== Independence ===
During the Mexican War of Independence (1810–1821), the government in Zacualpan was in charge of Manuel de la Concha, who at one point, abandoned the town and came back between 1816 and 1817 under the protection of the lieutenant colonel Manuel Gomez Pedraza and the second lieutenant colonel Mateo Cuitly from the royalist army. At the same time, Pedro Ascencio de Alquisiras conducted a guerrilla warfare in the region, establishing his headquarters in Zacualpan on March 12, 1821. He abandoned the region on June 2 and died during an ambush in Tetecala, Morelos. It is unknown who was left in charge of the government of Zacualpan (perhaps the task fell into the hands of is second-in-command Felipe Martinez).

=== Mexican Revolution to the Present ===
At the beginning of the Mexican Revolution, there were 17 small businesses in charge of the existing 40 mines. In 1919, the mine of El Alacran reached peak production and in 1927 consisted of 9 levels with a depth of 300 meters underground. In 1921, the mine of San Fernando reached a modest peak of production too.

The census of 1930 reported that the population in Zacualpan had grown to 2,865 inhabitants with 25% of them dedicated to mining activities. By this time, no native dialects were spoken anymore.
