= Santo Tomás de los Plátanos =

- Town
- Location within Mexico
- Coordinates: 19°10′54″N 100°15′32″W
- Country: Mexico
- State: Mexico State
- Municipality: Santo Tomás

Government
  - Municipal president: Ismael Matías Domínguez
- Elevation: 1,380 m (4,530 ft)

Population (2005)Municipality
  - Total: 8,888
  - Seat: 2,823
- Time zone: UTC-6 (CST)
- Postal code: 51100

Santo Tomás de los Plátanos also known as Nuevo Santo Tomás de los Plátanos is a town and municipal seat of the municipality of Santo Tomás, located in the center-west of Mexico State, in Mexico. It is approximately 185 km from Mexico City, and 107 km from Toluca.

== The town ==
The Náhuatl name for the area was Caltepec, but as early as 1631, records referred to the village here as Santo Tomás, which the municipality is still called. Don Vasco de Quiroga added "de los Plátanos" to the name of the village because of all the banana plantations nearby, but the name was not official until 1975. Few records exist from the colonial period, but the area was under the jurisdiction of San Martín Otzoloapan in the 19th century.

The current town of Santo Tomás de los Platanos (Saint Thomas of the bananas) was not the original seat of the municipality of Santo Tomás. The original Santo Tomás was flooded due to a hydroelectric dam that was built in 1945. This dam and its hydroelectric plant are of great economic importance to the region. Curiously, the church tower of the old town can still be seen rising above the water of the reservoir. The current Santo Tomas has a central garden surrounded by trees and a church.

The population of the town as of 2005 was 2,823 people.

== The municipality ==
As municipal seat, Santo Tomás de los Plátanos has governing jurisdiction over the following communities: San José Barbechos (Los Barbechos), Cieneguillas, La Laguna, El Ocotal, Potrero de Abajo (Colonia Guadalupe), Potrero de Arriba (La Ceiba), Ojo de Agua, Rincón Grande, Salitre de Cal (El Zapote), Salitre Terreros, San Miguel San de Mialma, San Pedro el Chico, San Pedro el Grande, San Pedro Ixtapantongo (Ixtapantongo), Santa Bárbara, Poblado de Santo Tomás (El Puerto San Isidro), Tacuitapan, Pueblo Viejo, Rincón Vivero (El Maracaná), El Llano, Las Canoas, El Jocoyol (San José el Jocoyol), El Salitre Bramador, El Aguacate, El Anono, Potrero de Abajo (Granadillo), El Sifón, Las Fincas, El Pedregal, Rincón Chico, Los Nogales, El Aguacate, El Plan, and Frontón Vivero.

It has a territorial extension of 110.91 square kilometers, and the population total for the municipality in 2005 was 8,888. It borders with the municipalities of Ixtapan del Oro, Valle de Bravo and Otzoloapan, as well as the state of Michoacán to the west.

The climate of Santo Tomás de los Platanos is sub tropical, with a rainy season in summer. The principal ecosystems consist of varied vegetation, from lowland jungle, temperate forest and agricultural land, although many forests here have suffered damage. The fruits that are grown in Santo Tomas de los Platanos are lemons, oranges, papayas, bananas, mango, coffee, sapodilla, guava, tamarind, and chayotes.

From 18 to 22 of December, the inhabitants of Santo Tomás celebrate the feast day of Saint Thomas the Apostle. On October 14, they celebrate the municipality's anniversary in 1870.

People of Santo Tomas produce stuffed animals, washcloths, tablecloths, and napkins. There are also bread bakeries. However, the primary economic activity is cattle-raising.

The typical foods of Santo Tomas are turkey mole and tamales, which are served in family gatherings, weddings and quinceañeras.

Santo Tomás de los Plátanos offers scenic views to its visitors and is an option for practicing rappeling or taking long walks. It provides places to camp and swim.

The seat has 46 schools, which are attended by 128 teachers. For the rest of the municipality, it depends on state and federal support for the other 24 communities to teach kindergarten, elementary school, and high school, with 2,081 students in 155 groups with 97 classrooms. There is a technical school in the Casa de Cultura (House of Culture) called “Santiago Santana Avalos”. In Santa Barbara, there is televised high school for the students of that area. The illiteracy rate is about 18.53%, which is considered high.

== Notable people ==
- The welterweight boxing champion of the world, "Pipino" Cuevas was born in Santo Tomás de los Plátanos on December 27, 1957.
