= Tejupilco Municipality =

Tejupilco
- Municipality
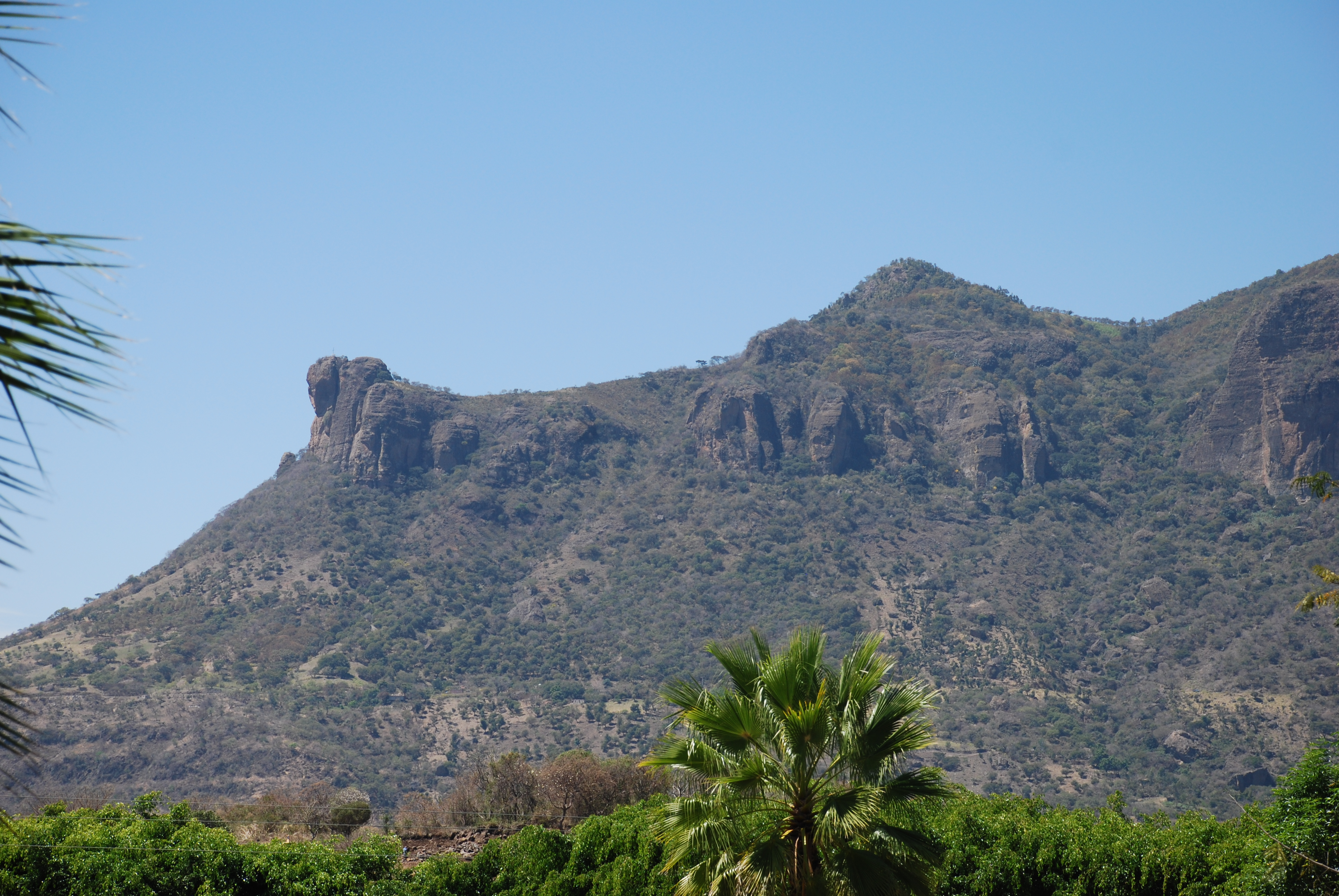
- Cerro de la Muñeca en el municipio de Tejupilco.

- Coat of arms

- Location of Tejupilco in the State of Mexico
- Coordinates: 18.9°N 100.24°W
- Country: Mexico
- State: State of Mexico
- Municipal seat: Tejupilco de Hidalgo
- Founded: April 1829

Area
  - Total: 1,327.56 km^{2} (512.57 sq mi)
- Elevation: 1,117 m (3,665 ft)

Population (2005)
  - Total: 62,547
  - Density: 47.114/km^{2} (122.03/sq mi)
- Time zone: UTC-6 (CST)

Tejupilco is a municipality in the State of Mexico, Mexico, located approximately 100 kilometres (62 mi) southwest of the state capital Toluca, along Federal Highway 134. Its municipal seat is Tejupilco de Hidalgo. The municipality has a total area of about 1,327 km^{2} (512 sq mi), with a contrasting topography ranging from deep ravines and canyons to high ridges; the highest elevation within the municipality reaches some 1,117 metres (3,660 ft) asl. The 2005 census recorded a population of 62,547 inhabitants.

Tejupilco was the first municipalities founded in April 1829.

Dating from before the Spanish Conquest, indigenous groups such as Otomi, Mazahua and Matlatzinca have lived in the area now contained by the modern municipality. A number of pre-Columbian archaeological sites within the municipal boundaries are known, but as yet little investigated. The name "Tejupilco" derives from Nahuatl and means "in the toes."

Main economic activities are in the agricultural and local retail sectors. Agriculture is the most significant, with some 93,586 hectares (231,260 acres) under cultivation. Commerce and retail ranks as the second-most productive economic sector.

A market held each Sunday is a main retail venue, where products and crafts typical of the region are sold.

The typical gastronomy of the region includes a bread known as "niguas", which is made with natural fruit.

== Demography ==
As municipal seat, Tejupilco de Hidalgo has governing authority over the following communities:

- Acamuchitlán
- Aguacate-Monte de Dios
- Almoloya de las Granadas
- La Angostura Primera
- Las Anonas
- Antimonio Pantoja
- Santiago Arizmendi (Arizmendi)
- Arballo
- Barranca de Ixtapan
- Bejucos
- Cacahuananche
- Cerro de Cacalotepec (Cacalotepec)
- Campanario de Ixtapan (El Campanario)
- La Cañada
- Cañadas de San Simón (Cañada de Chivas)
- Rincón de Carboneras (Carboneras)
- Cerro de los Elizaldes
- El Cirián de la Laguna (El Cirián)
- El Ciruelo
- El Corupo
- Cuadrilla de López
- Cuadrilla de los Martínez (Los Martínez)
- Los Melchores de San Lucas (Los Melchores)
- La Florida (Kilómetro Cinco)
- Santa Rosa (Las Juntas)
- Los Cuervos
- Cuevillas
- Epazotes
- La Estancia de Ixtapan
- San Miguel Ixtapan
- Jalpan (Jalpan San Simón)
- La Joya de San Lucas
- Juluapan (Juloapan)
- La Labor de Zaragoza
- Llano Grande
- El Mamey de San Lucas
- Mazatepec
- La Mesa
- Las Mesas de Ixtapan (Las Mesas)
- Monte de Dios
- San Andrés Ocotepec
- Ojo de Agua (Rincón de Ugarte)
- La Palma Cuata (La Palma)
- Pantoja
- Paso del Guayabal (El Paso)
- Paso de Vigas
- Plan del Puente
- El Platanal (El Platanal de San Lucas)
- Plaza de Gallos
- El Potrero de Ixtapan (El Potrero)
- Potrero Grande
- Puerto del Aire
- Rincón de Aguirre
- Rincón del Guayabal
- Rincón del Carmen
- Lodo Prieto
- Rincón de Ugarte
- Río Chiquito
- Río de Aquiagua (Aquiagua)
- Río Grande
- Salitre de Acamuchitlán (El Salitre)
- San Gabriel Pantoja
- San José de la Laguna
- San Lucas del Maíz (San Lucas)
- San Mateo (San Mateo Ixtapan)
- Sauz de San Lucas (El Sauz)
- Tejapan Limones (Tejapan)
- Tenería (Pueblo Nuevo)
- Tirados
- Zacatepec
- El Zapote de Ixtapan (El Zapote)
- Las Juntas del Salto
- Llano Grande (Llano Grande de San Lucas)
- Salitre de San Lucas
- El Salto (El Salto Dos)
- El Sauz Ocotepec (El Sauz)
- Suquitila
- Rincón de Jaimes
- Las Ánimas
- Las Juntas
- Ilamos
- El Picacho del Rincón del Guayabal
- Cuadrilla de Leones
- Barro Prieto
- El Zapote de Acamuchitlán (El Zapote)
- Agua Bendita
- Ocoyapan
- La Parota (Rancho las Parotas)
- Cerro Gordo
- Los Nopales
- Jumiltepec
- Mesa de Gallos (El Llano)
- Potrero del Guayabal
- Puerto de Jalpan (Jalpa)
- San Francisco
- Los Baños
- La Calera
- El Carmen de Ixtapan
- La Cabecera (Cabecera de los Arrayanes)
- La Cuitacera
- La Guitarra
- Hacienda de Ixtapan
- Las Ilamas
- Las Juntas de Ixtapan
- Naranjo
- Chiquito
- El Naranjo Grande
- Paredes Prietas
- Los Pericones
- Los Pinzanes (La Pinzanera)
- Rincón de San Gabriel
- Salto Grande
- Santa María de las Flores
- Tonatilco
- Zapote del Ancón
- Agua Negra
- Fundadora de San Lucas del Maíz
- Rancho las Moras (Las Moras)
- Cerro Alto (Milpa Vieja)
- Piedra Ancha
- Plan de Maguey
- Cuadrilla del Molino
- Paso de la Parota
- La Cofradía (Los Mangos)
- Planes de la Cofradía (Los Planes)
- La Calera
- El Guayabo
- La Bolsa
- Coahuilotes
- Paso de San Juan
- Cerro del Chirimoyo
- Pinzán Morado
- El Rodeo
- Limón de San Lucas del Maíz
- Encinos Verdes
- Antonio de San Lucas del Maíz
- Cerro de Mazatepec
- Cerro del Divisadero
- Cerro de los Huérfanos
- La Laguna de Mazatepec
- El Limón de la Estancia
- El Ocote
- Las Mesas de los Capires (Las Mesas)
- Puerto la Piedra Labrada (Pto. de Carboneras)
- Puerto Madroño
- El Capire (Colonia el Capire)
- Lomas de Tejupilco
- Colonia México Sesenta y Ocho
- Juntas de Zacatepec (El Pedregal 2a. Mza.)
- Rincón de López
- El Capire de Pantoja
- Col. Benito Juárez (Lázaro Cárdenas del Río)
- El Cuagüilote Ojo de Agua (La Pera)
- El Jumate
- Santa Rosa Rincón de Jaimes
- Rincón del Naranjo-La Cabecera
- Antimonio
- Colonia Buenavista Primera Sección
- El Puerto del Blanqueadero (Peñas Pintas)
- Rincón el Sauz Ocotepec
- Rinconada de la Labor
- El Burrito (El Sauz)
- Las Lomas (Los Depósitos)
- El Molino del Salto (Galera del Molino)
- Rincón Chiquito
- Los Colorines
- El Salitre Segunda Sección

The total municipal area is 1,327.56 km^{2} (512.57 sq mi), and it has a total population of 62,547 people. It borders Otzoloapan, Zacazonapan, Temascaltepec, San Simón de Guerrero, Amatepec, Sultepec, Texcaltitlán as well as with the states of Michoacán and Guerrero to the west.
