= Coatepec Harinas =

Town & municipality in State of Mexico, Mexico

- Town & Municipality
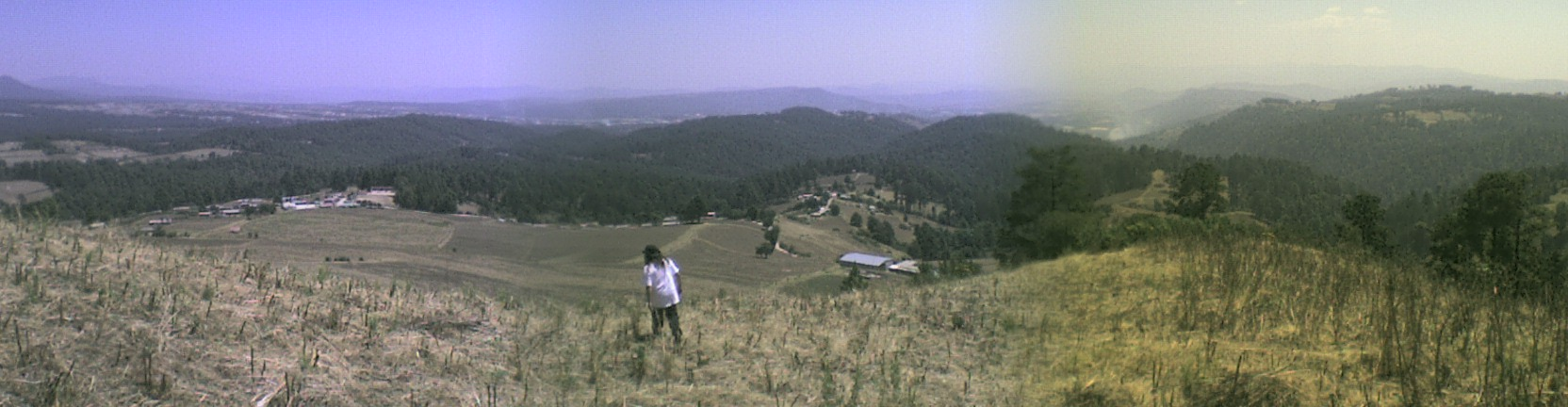

- Coat of arms

- Location within Mexico Location within State of Mexico
- Coordinates: 18°55′25″N 99°46′07″W
- Country: Mexico
- State: State of Mexico
- Municipal Status: 1825

Government
  - Municipal President: Gilberto Mendez (2012–2016)
- Elevation (of seat): 2,260 m (7,410 ft)

Population (2005) Municipality
  - Municipality: 31,860
  - Seat: 6,184
- Time zone: UTC-6 (Central)
- Postal code (of seat): 51700
- Website: (in Spanish) Archive

Coatepec Harinas is one of 125 municipalities in the State of Mexico, Mexico. The municipal seat is the town of Coatepec Harinas. The original name is "Coauhtepetl" which means 'serpent hill' in Náhuatl. Around 1825 because of a boom in flour production, the name "Harinas" was added.

== The town ==
It is located on the southern edge of the Nevado de Toluca, 35 km (22 mi) south-southeast of the city of Toluca and 27 km (17 mi) west of Tenancingo. The earliest town of Coauhtepetl was probably settled sometime between 650 and 750 AD. Between 1522 and 1524 the area was subjugated by Gonzalo de Sandoval and Andrés de Tapia. Between 1560 and 1563 a new town was constructed on the site. In 1623, the first parish was constructed.

== The municipality ==
As municipal seat, Coatepec Harinas has governing jurisdiction over the following communities:

- Acuitlapilco
- Agua Amarga
- Agua Bendita
- Alta de Laja Azul
- Baja de Laja Azul
- Chiltepec de Hidalgo
- Cochisquila
- Colonia Adolfo López Mateos
- Colonia el Potrero (El Potrero)
- Colonia Guadalupe
- Cruz de Piedra
- Cuentla, El Cedrito
- El Picacho
- El Potrerito (El Potrero)
- El Reynoso
- El Telar
- Huayanalco
- Ixtlahuaca de Villada
- La Cercada, La Conchita
- La Galera, La Laguna
- La Providencia
- La Rosa
- Las Jaras
- Las Mesas
- Las Trojes
- Las Vueltas
- Llano Grande
- Loma de Acuitlapilco
- Los Fresnos
- Meyuca de Morelos (Meyuca)
- Monte de las Vueltas
- Piedras Anchas (Primera del Monte)
- Plan de San Francisco
- Potrero Redondo
- Primera de Analco
- Primera de San Miguel (La Punta)
- Primera de Santa Ana
- Primera de Zacanguillo (Santo Niño Doctor)
- Primera del Monte (La Presa)
- Puerta del Carmen
- San Fernando
- San José del Progreso (San José)
- San Luis (Colonia Hidalgo)
- San Martín el Salto
- San Pedro, Santo Niño
- Segunda de Analco (La Presa)
- Segunda de San Miguel (El Cerrito)
- Segunda de Santa Ana, Segunda de Zacanguillo
- Segunda del Monte (La Presa), Tecolotepec, Teocotitla
- and Zacatones (San Felipe de Jesús)

It covers a total surface area of 35.50 km^{2} (14 sq mi) and, in the year 2000 census, it reported a population of 252,555. The altitude of the municipality varies because of its topography between 3,000 and 1,900 above sea level. The municipality borders Temascaltepec, Zinacantepec, Toluca, Tenango del Valle, Villa Guerrero, Ixtapan de la Sal, Zacualpan, Almoloya de Alquisiras and Texcaltitlan. The current municipality was created in 1949.

In this town the people use to cultivate some fruit trees. The main product of this region is peaches. The production of other fruits depend on the season.

== History ==
As of March 17, 2021, the municipality reported 57 cases and three deaths due to the COVID-19 pandemic in Mexico.

At least thirteen police officers were ambushed and killed by a criminal gang in the town of Llano Grande on March 18, 2021.

== Climate ==
Climate data for Coatepec Harinas (1991–2020 normals, extremes 1961–present)
Month	Jan	Feb	Mar	Apr	May	Jun	Jul	Aug	Sep	Oct	Nov	Dec	Year
Record high °C (°F)	29 (84)	29.5 (85.1)	31 (88)	32 (90)	32 (90)	30 (86)	28.5 (83.3)	29 (84)	28.5 (83.3)	31 (88)	35 (95)	29 (84)	35 (95)
Mean daily maximum °C (°F)	22.0 (71.6)	23.1 (73.6)	25.2 (77.4)	26.2 (79.2)	25.6 (78.1)	23.8 (74.8)	23.0 (73.4)	22.9 (73.2)	22.8 (73.0)	23.2 (73.8)	23.2 (73.8)	22.4 (72.3)	23.6 (74.5)
Daily mean °C (°F)	13.2 (55.8)	14.1 (57.4)	16.2 (61.2)	17.9 (64.2)	17.9 (64.2)	17.4 (63.3)	16.9 (62.4)	17.2 (63.0)	16.8 (62.2)	16.2 (61.2)	15.1 (59.2)	13.8 (56.8)	16.1 (61.0)
Mean daily minimum °C (°F)	4.3 (39.7)	5.2 (41.4)	7.2 (45.0)	9.5 (49.1)	10.2 (50.4)	11.0 (51.8)	10.9 (51.6)	11.4 (52.5)	10.9 (51.6)	9.2 (48.6)	7.0 (44.6)	5.3 (41.5)	8.5 (47.3)
Record low °C (°F)	−5 (23)	−2 (28)	−3.5 (25.7)	3 (37)	4 (39)	4 (39)	2 (36)	5.5 (41.9)	5 (41)	1 (34)	−3 (27)	−3.5 (25.7)	−5 (23)
Average precipitation mm (inches)	13.1 (0.52)	10.9 (0.43)	14.3 (0.56)	32.3 (1.27)	109.8 (4.32)	211.9 (8.34)	218.9 (8.62)	217.0 (8.54)	240.7 (9.48)	114.1 (4.49)	26.5 (1.04)	14.0 (0.55)	1,223.5 (48.17)
Average precipitation days (≥ 0.01 mm)	2.1	2.3	2.7	4.8	13.6	19.7	20.1	22.4	22.2	13.2	4.5	1.8	129.4
Source: Servicio Meteorológico Nacional
