= Temascaltepec =

- Municipality
- Coat of arms
- Interactive map of Temascaltepec
- Coordinates: 19°54′34″N 99°08′41″W
- Country: Mexico
- State: State of Mexico
- Region: Ixtapan Region
- Municipal seat: Temascaltepec de González
- Elevation (of seat): 2,200 m (7,200 ft)

Population (2020)
  - Municipality: 35,014
- Time zone: UTC-6 (CST)
- Website: (in Spanish) http://www.temascaltepec.gob.mx/

Temascaltepec is a municipality located in the Ixtapan Region of the State of Mexico in Mexico. Temascaltepec has an area of 547.5 km^{2}. It borders the municipalities of Valle de Bravo, Amanalco de Becerra, Tejupilco, San Simón de Guerrero, Texcaltitlán, Zinacantepec, Coatepec Harinas, and Zacazonapan. Temascaltepec's population was 26,968 in 1990, but rose to 30,336 by 2005, according to INEGI.

== History ==
This area was home to Nahuas, Matlatzincas and Mazahuas. Temascaltepec may have originally been a subject town of nearby Texcaltitlán. It was conquered by Aztec emperor Axayacatl and was designated the capital of a strategic province. It fought wars with the neighboring Purepecha Empire to the west.

== Geography ==
The Mountain of Temascaltepec is a prolongation of Nevado de Toluca and crosses the municipality. The most significant elevations are the hills of Temeroso, Soledad, Fortin, Peñas del Diablo, Peñon, Tres Reyes and Juan Luis. The three main rivers of Temascaltepec are Verde or De la Presa, Vado, and Temascaltepec. All three rivers experience water flow year-round. In addition, there are 41 freshwater springs. The municipality is warm and subtropical in the north and east, and semi-arid in the south and west. Average temperatures vary between 18 and 22 °C (64 and 72 °F) and annual precipitation is from 800 to 1,600 mm (31 to 63 in).

=== Flora and fauna ===
The area hosts a diverse array of flora and fauna. Plant life include: ash trees (Fraxinus spp.), pine (Pinus spp.), oyamel (Abies religiosa), holm oak (Quercus ilex), cedar, sabino, guaje (Leucaena esculenta), tepegauje (Lysiloma acapulcense), madroño (Arbutus xalapensis), mahogany (Swietenia spp.), Jacaranda spp., capulín (Prunus salicifolia), guavas (Psidium spp.), such as arrayán (P. sartorianum), mangos (Mangifera spp.), copal (Copaifera spp.) and peanut (Arachis hypogaea).

Animal life include cats, deer, collared peccary (Pecari tajacu), squirrels, cuinique (Notocitellus adocetus), long-tailed weasel (Mustela frenata), hares, nine-banded armadillo, tejón (Nasua narica), tigrillo, bats, pocket gophers, skunks, cacomiztle (Bassariscus astutus), gray fox (Urocyon cinereoargenteus), sparrowhawks (Accipiter spp.), eagles, vulture, common raven (Corvus corax), quebrantahueso (Caracara cheriway), owls, magpie-jays (Calocitta spp.), chachalaca, quail, huilota (Zenaida macroura), corn birds, turtledove, bobo, multo birds, chichicuilote (possibly Charadrius wilsonia), tortoises, cincuantes, scorpions, alicante, toads, lizards, frogs and axolotls (Ambystoma mexicanum).

The principal natural resources, aside from minerals, are the forests, being present on 68% of the territory. The remaining territory is distributed amongst agricultural use, urban zones, breeding grounds, ways and water-bearing areas.

== Politics ==
Mayor	Time
Darío Basurto González	2000-2003
Sergio Rubí González	2003-2006
Noe Barrueta Barrón	2006-2009
Hugo Ernesto Jaramillo Colin	2009-2012
José Alejandro Galicia Nuñez	2013-2015
Noé Barrueta Barrón	2016-2018
Erik Ramírez Hernández	2019-2021

== Demographics ==
Town	2010 Census Population
Total	
Temascaltepec de González	
La Albarrada (San Francisco la Albarrada)	
San Sebastián Carboneras (Carboneras)	
Carnicería	
El Cerro Pelón	
Cieneguillas de González(Cieneguillas)	
Cieneguillas de Labra	
La Comunidad	
La Estancia de Tequesquipan	
La Finca	
La Guacamaya	
Jesús del Monte	
Labor las Cabras	
Lampazos	
Mesón Viejo	
Milpas Viejas	
Pedregales de Tequesquipan	
El Peñón	
Plan de Vigas	
Potrero de San José (La Rinconada)	
Potrero de Tenayac	
Real de Arriba	
Rincón de Atarasquillo	
Rincón de San Andrés	
Rincón de Tequesquipan	
El Salitre	
San Andrés de los Gama	
San Antonio Albarranes	
San Francisco Oxtotilpan	
San Lucas del Pulque	
San Mateo Almomoloa	
San Miguel Oxtotilpan	
San Pedro Tenayac	
Telpintla	
San Martín Tequesquipan (Tequesquipan)	
Los Timbres	
Las Trancas	
El Tule	
Manzana de Tequesquipan (Las Manzanas)	
San Juan	
Hoyos de Vázquez	
Cajones	
La Cumbre	
El Chilar del Ejido de las Trancas	
Barrio la Magdalena (La Magdalena)	
Los Ocotes	
Paredones	
El Varal	
Barrio de Cantarranas	
Barrio la Cascada (Barrio del Varal)	
La Laguna	
La Loba	
Las Mesas de Real de Arriba	
Pueblo Nuevo	
Fraccionamiento Campestre Rancho Viejo	
San José	
El Salitre	
Santanas	
Ejido Real de Arriba	
Manzana del Jabalí	
Granjas de Cieneguillas	
La Orejeta	
Mina del Rincón	
Fraccionamiento Campestre	
