= Guillermina Casique Vences =

Mexican politician

Guillermina Casique Vences (born 2 August 1961) is a Mexican politician from the Institutional Revolutionary Party (PRI). In the 2009 mid-terms she was elected to the Chamber of Deputies to represent the State of Mexico's 36th district during the 61st session of Congress (2009 to 2012).
