= Otzoloapan =

- Coat of arms

- Location within Mexico
- Coordinates: 19°07′01″N 100°17′42″W
- Country: Mexico
- State: Mexico State
- Founded: before 1476
- Municipality Status: 1894

Government
  - Municipal President: Santos Cabrera Cruz (2009–2012)
- Elevation: 1,380 m (4,530 ft)

Population (2005)Municipality
  - Total: 4,748
  - Seat: 1,586
- Time zone: UTC-6 (CST)
- Postal code: 51130

Otzoloapan Municipality is a municipality located at the southeast of the State of Mexico. The name is from the Náhuatl 'Oceloapan' which means "river of lynxes". It is located in the southwest part of the state bordering the state of Michoacán.

== Municipal seat ==
The area was first settled by the Matlatzincas in the pre-Hispanic era. In 1476, it became subject to the Aztec Triple Alliance when Axayácatl conquered Matlatzinca lands. After the Spanish conquest, the land in the area was redistributed among the Spaniards, with Juana Gamboa getting Tejupilco and Otzoloapan. Then he built a sugar mill here to process the cane growing in the surrounding area. The area was probably first evangelized by the Franciscans, and the parish of Otzoloapan was founded by Juan Marqués del Aguila, in 1560 by order of Hernán Cortés. This is considered to be the beginning of the town.

The village had a population as of 2005 of 1,586.

- There is a chapel called "Zuluapan" that is located in the plaza principal. It is the community gathering center and most important site of the village. From 7 to 11 November, the village honors its patron saint, San Martin Obispo.
- An underground jail cell used to imprison rebellious indigenous people can still be seen here.

== Population ==
The total municipality has and in 2005 had a population of 4,748. It borders the municipalities of Santo Tomás de los Plátanos, Zacazonapan, Tejupilco, Temascaltepec, and Valle de Bravo and with state of Michoacán. The municipality was founded in 1894.

== Geography ==
=== Localities ===
As municipal seat, Otzoloapan has governing jurisdiction over the following communities: Agua Zarca de Abajo, Agua Zarca (Agua Zarca de Arriba), El Calvario (San José el Calvario), Carranza, La Carrera, Cruz Blanca, Estancia Chica, El Grajenal, Llano Grande (El Órgano), Pinal del Marquesado, Puerto del Tigre, San Miguel Piru (El Piru), Terreros, El Zapote (La Parota), Zuluapan, La Punta Tingambato (Tingambato del Sur), San Miguel de la Campana (San Miguel), Burrusqueta, El Pedregal, El Limón 1, La Lumbrera, Las Paredes, El Quinto, El Marquesado de Llano Grande, Mesa del Zapote, La Presa (La Compuerta), La Palma, La Presa del Padre, Rancho Viejo (Manzana del Calvario), El Rodeo, Barrio de Guadalupe (Los Lotes), El Limón 2, La Mora, and El Rincón de Mesa.

Otzoloapan contains 160.48 km2 that represent the 71% of state territory. It is composed of 42 towns and is at an altitude of 1314 meters above sea level.

=== Flora ===
In the higher elevations pine trees, holm oaks and oak trees can be found. In the warmer, lower elevations, there are pines, holm oaks, tepehuaje, huizache, truenos, and ash trees, among others. Communities in the higher elevations depend on the forests economically.

== Economy ==
Agriculture is the most important economic activity in the municipality, mostly growing seasonal crops like corn, with some production of vegetables and fruit. The municipality lacks an industrial base. While the area does have mountains and forests, these have not yet been exploited touristically.
