= Ixtapan del Oro =

- Town & Municipality
- Location within Mexico
- Coordinates: 19°15′41″N 100°15′46″W
- Country: Mexico
- State: State of Mexico
- Municipal Status: 1870

Government
  - Municipal President: Salvador Christopher Vergara Cruz (2006-2009)
- Elevation of seat: 1,640 m (5,380 ft)

Population (2005) Municipality
  - Municipality: 6,349
  - Seat: 913
- Time zone: UTC-6 (Central)

Ixtapan del Oro is a town and municipality in the State of Mexico, in Mexico. The name “Ixtapan” comes from Nahuatl and means 'in the place of little salt'. "del Oro" is Spanish, meaning 'of the gold'. This name was added in 1894 when some veins of gold were found here.

== The town ==
It is a small town of only 913 people. This town is located at the western limits of Mexico State. It was founded in 1650 but received its name in 1870 as a municipality.

A number of archeological artifacts are displayed in the town's central garden, including a monolith called "Tlazolteotl”, uncovered nearby, about which little is known with certainty. In 1987, the municipal government located in the town established the ecological park of "El Salto de Chihuahua" to promote tourism in the region.

The town church, called San Martine Ocoxochitepec, is an amalgam of a number of different styles, but its atrium clearly marks its beginnings in the 16th century. It was last remodeled in 1975.

The Casa de la Cultura (House of Culture) "Joaquín Arcadio Pagaza" was opened in 1993 and the sports facility of "Graciela Mendoza Barrios" was opened in 1996.

One of the notable residents of the town is poet and bishop Joaquin Arcadio Pagaza (1839–1918) (poet and bishop) who wrote two sonnets about Ixtapan del Oro, "Ixtapan" y “La Huerta". Another is Rigoberto Jaimes Gómez, who was the president of the town in 1973 to 1975 and was responsible for many beneficial projects for the community. Víctor Limas Torres was a painter who painted many landscapes of the area.

== The municipality ==
As municipal seat, the town of Ixtapan del Oro has governing jurisdiction over the following communities: Ayalita, Casas Largas, Ejido de Miahuatlán, El Chilar, El Teperreal, La Calera de los Gallos, La Calzada, La Mesa de San Martín, La Palma (Mina), La Puerta Miahuatlán de Hidalgo (Santa Cruz Miahuatlán), Milpillas, Sabanilla, San Martín Ocoxochitepec (San Martín), San Miguel Ixtapan, San Telmo, Santa Cruz Viejo, and Tutuapan.

It covers a total surface area of 82.49 km^{2} on a plateau at an altitude of 1,640 meters. In the year 2005 census, it reported a population of 6,349. The economy is principally farming, concentrating on the production of corn, bean and fruit. It has a tourist attractive for its weather, has one waterfall El Salto de Chihuahua and one reserve with camping zone and thermal pools. It has archeology zone that hasn't been explorer.

=== Natural geography ===
There are many rivers in this town, the main are the Río Balsas, Río Cutzamala and Río Ixtapan and this zone has fresh-water springs and thermal springs. In the north limit there is a waterfall called El salto de Chihuahua that is 200 feet (61 m) tall. The weather is temperate and somewhat humid with temperatures around 16 to 20 °C (60.8 to 68.0 °F), and rains in summer. There are a lot of trees including pine, cedar, oak and walnut, as well as fruit trees such as guava, sapodilla, mamey and mango. The farm plants are the corn, beans, tomatoes and green tomatoes. Ornamental plants include tulips, daisies and calla lilies. In the zone there are sand, gravel, stone and marble mines, principally used for construction.

=== History ===
There is some archeological ruins near the town of San Miguel Ixtapan, which have only been partially explored. There are also traces of human habitation before the Spanish conquest at the Cerro de las Tapazones also known as El Pedregal and Cerro de Tepalcate.

During the colonial period, in the 16th century, the territory of Ixtapan del Oro belonged to San Francisco Temascaltepec, (today Valle de Bravo) and Tuzantla. During the Mexican War of Independence, Cerro Valiente (Brave Hill) was the site of a battle which was won by the royalist Juan Bautista de la Torre against the insurgents that were operating in the Valle (Valley) de Temascaltepec and in Sultepec. In 1834, the area was considered part of the municipality of Otzoloapan. While it has never been officially declared a municipality, Ixtapan del Oro has been appearing on maps since 1870. By agreement, the municipality's anniversary is celebrated on February 23 of each year.
