= Amatepec =

- Municipality
- Coat of arms

- Location of the municipality in Mexico State

- Location in Mexico
- Coordinates: 18°39′N 100°9′W
- Country: Mexico
- State: Mexico State

Area
  - Total: 624.9 km^{2} (241.3 sq mi)

Population (2005)
  - Total: 27,026
- Time zone: UTC-6 (Central Standard Time)

Amatepec is one of 125 municipalities, in Mexico State in Mexico. The municipal seat is the town of Amatepec and its largest town is Palmar Chico. The municipality covers an area of 624.9 km^{2}. The name Amatepec comes from Náhuatl meaning "hill of the Amate tree". This place was once inhabited by Matlatzincas and Chontal people.

The Spanish discovered silver lodes here in 1531, which started commercial silver mining in the area. Along with Sultepec, the area became known as the "Provincia de la Plata".

As of 2005, the municipality had a total population of 27,026.

== Archaeological site ==
Northeastern of the city around 15 miles away of Amatepec, was discovered the Archaeological site of San Miguel Ixtapan that belonged to the Otomi people. This place is the most important prehispanic site discovered in this region. This place also has ballgame court.

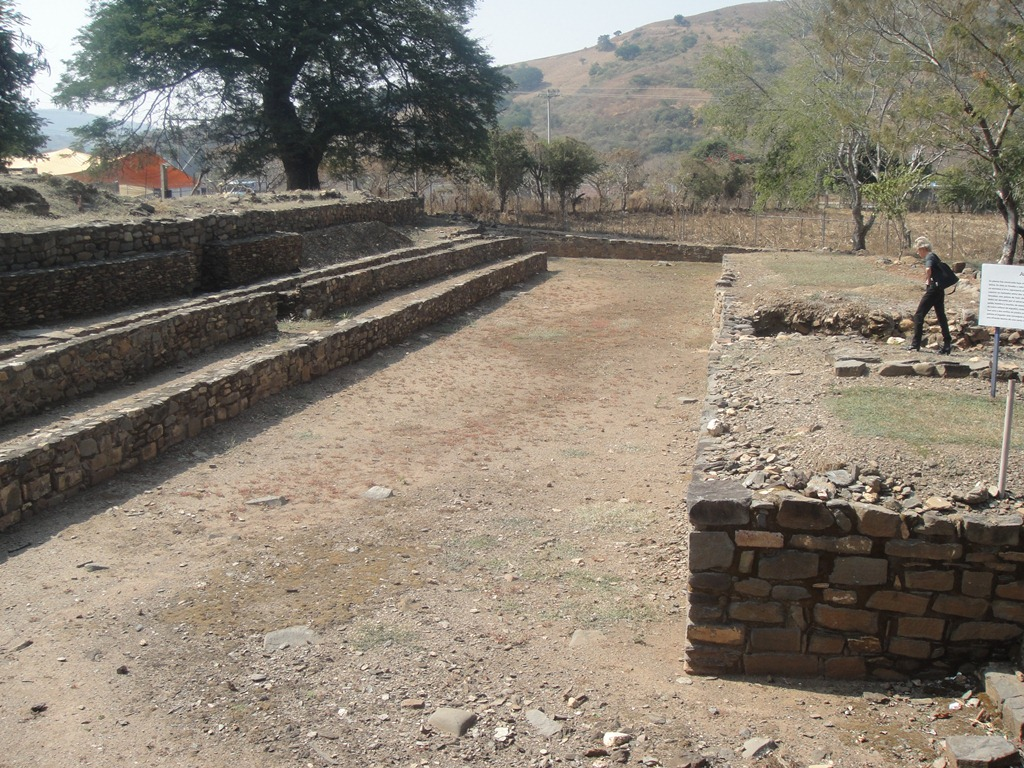
San Miguel Ixtapan, ballgame court
