= Amanalco =

Amanalco Amanalco de Becerra
- Municipality and town
- Coat of arms

- Location of the municipality in Mexico State

- Location in Mexico
- Coordinates: 19°15′N 100°01′W
- Country: Mexico
- State: Mexico (state)

Area
  - Total: 219.49 km^{2} (84.75 sq mi)

Population (2005)
  - Total: 20,343
- Time zone: UTC-6 (Central Standard Time)
- Website: (in Spanish) Official Website

Amanalco is a municipality, in Mexico State in Mexico. The municipal seat is the town of Amanalco de Becerra and includes several larger towns including San Juan, San Jerónimo, San Bartolo, and San Mateo. The municipality covers an area of 219.49 km^{2}.

As of 2005, the municipality had a total population of 20,343.

The original name was N’dabi, which in Otomi means “place where tree trunks float” or “where there is much water.” The current name is from Nahuatl and means “near a lake” or “an extension of water.” The municipality has both an Aztec glyph as well as a coat of arms.

== History ==
This area became populated 15,000 to 20,000 years ago when nomads entered this valley in search of mammoths. Between 7,000 and 12,000 years ago, the people of this area gradually became sedentary, forming villages, and initiating agriculture based on corn, beans, squash and chili peppers. One of the first known tribes to dominate this area was the Matlatzinca around 3,500 BCE, but suffered attacks by neighboring Purépecha. By the pre-classic period, society had developed into stratified tribes and by 200 BCE a tributary system has been developed. On the site of the town of Amanalco was found a 7,000-year-old human footprint in volcanic rock belonging to someone now called the “man of Amanalco.” The Aztecs conquered this area along with the rest of the Valley del Matlatzinco (today Toluca Valley) in 1476 under the rule of Axayacatl. Amanalco came under the jurisdiction of Metepec.

After the Spanish conquest of the Aztec Empire, Gonzalo de Sandoval took control of the valley with ease, as the native Matzalincas saw the Spaniards as a way to protect themselves from the Purépecha. The valley then became part of the lands awarded to Hernán Cortés when he was named the Marquis of the Valley of Oaxaca by the Spanish king. Under Spanish rule in the early colonial period, Amanalco remained subject to Metepec. A village was founded in the middle of the 16th century by several medicinal herb collectors, according to oral tradition. Franciscans came to the village and named it San Jerónimo Amanalco. By 1600, the Mexicas had abandoned the area and groups of Otomi came to settle. In 1604, Amanalco was made a governing center for the area. The Amanalco area was the encomendero of Juan de Sámano, whose Hacienda en Zinacantepec, La Gavia, claimed lands in Amanalco. However, the natives of the area managed to reclaim this land. In 1613. The village’s church was constructed in the 16th century. The church became a parish in 1768 as a dependency of the parish of San Francisco del Valle, now Valle del Bravo. The population of the town joined with the insurgency in 1810 and many fought against royalist general Juan Bautista de la Torre as part of Miguel Hidalgo’s army. In return, the village asked for legal title to the land on which it sits, as the La Gavia Hacienda still made claims here. The first Spanish families moved here only in the early 19th century. At this time the village was also known as Amanalco de las Cucharas (spoons) as it was noted to the manufacture of spoons. The village and surrounding area became a municipality in 1826. The village supported the Play de Ayutla in 1854. In 1858, liberal General Felipe Berriozábal came through here on his way to Mexico City, fighting against conservative guerrilla forces.

The village was declared a town in 1875 and added “de Becerra” to the name after José María Becerra. Becerra was a parish priest here in the mid-19th century. He worked here for over twenty years, instructing natives on carpentry, introduced potable water and building houses which were donated to families in the municipality. He died in 1868 in what is now Valle de Bravo, but his remains were brought back to Amanalco and buried in the parish church. He is considered to be a protector of the community.

During the Porfirio Díaz period (1880s to 1910), the La Gavia Hacienda again made claims on the land of the municipality and eventually took over the economic life of the town, with almost all the inhabitants working for the hacienda for little pay. For this reason, the residents joined the forces of Andrés Fabila during the Mexican Revolution, who were aligned with the Zapatistas. However, the town was destroyed by Zapatista forces under Carmen Esquivel during the war. This left the municipality without a local government for several years. By 1919, steps had been taken to reconstruct the municipal seat under the direction of Alfonso Fabila, with the first post war municipal president being José Avila. However, the war had the effect of returning lands seized by the La Gavia Hacienda back to the indigenous and mestizo peoples of the municipality and the formation of ejidos. Reconstruction of the seat would continue until the mid-20th century. La Gavia was dispossessed under the government of Lázaro Cárdenas in the 1930s.
