= San Simón de Guerrero =

- Municipality
- Location in Mexico
- Coordinates: 19°01′21″N 100°0′24″W
- Country: Mexico
- State: Mexico (state)
- Municipal seat: San Simón de Guerrero

Area
  - Total: 127.42 km^{2} (49.20 sq mi)

Population (2005)
  - Total: 5,408
- Time zone: UTC-6 (Central Standard Time)

San Simón de Guerrero is one of 125 municipalities in the State of Mexico in Mexico. The municipality covers an area of 127.42 km^{2} (49.20 sq mi).

As of 2005, the municipality had a total population of 5,408.
