= Almoloya de Alquisiras =

- Municipality and town
- Coat of arms

- Location of the municipality in Mexico State

- Location in Mexico
- Coordinates: 18°51′N 99°51′W
- Country: Mexico
- State: Mexico (state)

Area
  - Total: 167.38 km^{2} (64.63 sq mi)

Population (2005)
  - Total: 14,196
- Time zone: UTC-6 (Central Standard Time)
- The official name of the city is Almoloya De Alqusiras

Almoloya de Alquisiras is a town and municipality, in Mexico State in Mexico. The municipality covers an area of 167.38 km^{2}.

As of 2005, the municipality had a total population of 14,196.

== Politics ==
Mayor	Time
Mayolo Gómez García	2000-2003
Cruz Juvenal Roa Sánchez	2003-2006
Gabriel Vázquez Mondragon	2006-2009
Francisco Rodriguez Posada	2009-2012
Artemio Gómez Cruz	2013-2015
Francisco Rodríguez Posada	2016-2018
