= Sultepec =

Coordinates: 18°52′N 99°57′W

- Municipality
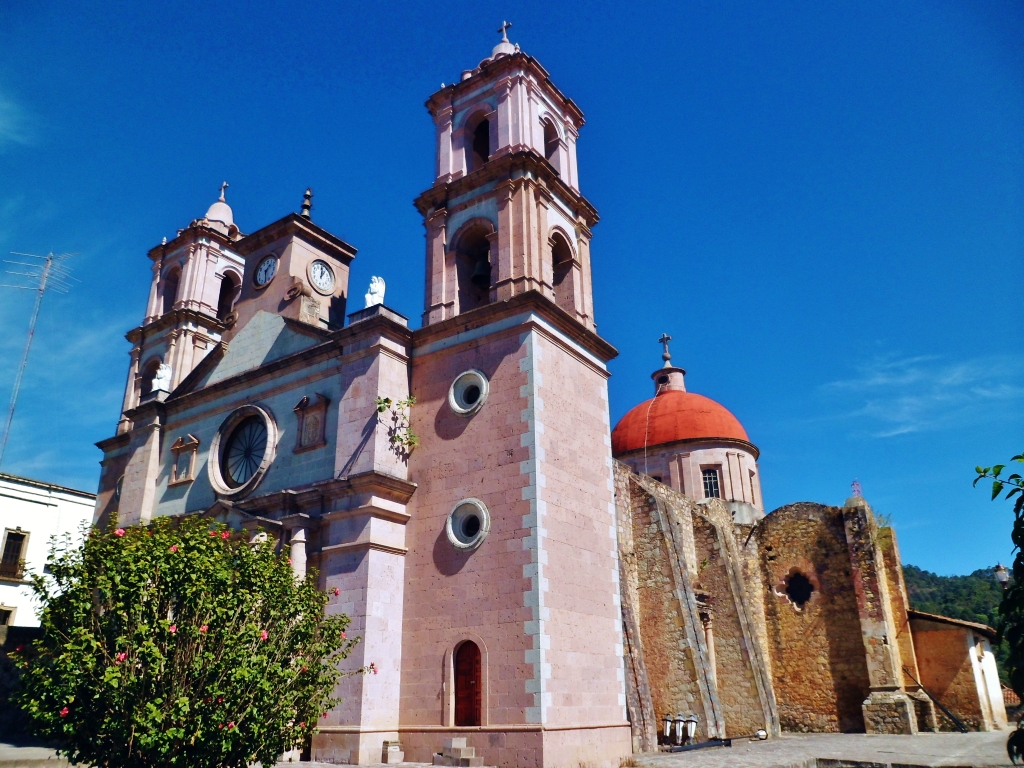

- Coat of arms
- Interactive map of Sultepec
- Country: Mexico
- State: Mexico (state)
- Municipal seat: Sultepec de Pedro Ascencio de Alquisiras

Area
  - Total: 552.52 km^{2} (213.33 sq mi)

Population (2005)
  - Total: 24,986
- Time zone: UTC-6 (Central Standard Time)

Sultepec is a municipality in the State of Mexico in Mexico. The municipal seat is Sultepec de Pedro Ascencio de Alquisiras. The municipality covers an area of 552.52 km^{2} (213.33 sq mi).

The Spanish discovered silver lodes here in 1531, which started commercial silver mining in the area. Along with Amatepec the area became known as the "Provincia de la Plata". Johann Engel was one of the Germans to settle in the area in 1536, and introduced litharge as a flux in the smelting of the ore. Amalgamation was used on a large scale in 1556.

As of 2005, the municipality had a total population of 24,986.

== History ==
According to the relaciones geográficas, an unattested language called "Mazatec" was spoken in Sultepec in the 16th century. The affiliation of this language is uncertain, but Peter Gerhard hypothesized that Mazatec was used here as an alternative name for the Mazahua language, while Donald Brand suspected that the Mazatec presence in this region was the result of Aztec population transfers.
