= Greater Toluca =

Metropolitan statistical area in Mexico

Toluca Metropolitan Area
- Metropolitan Area
- Zona Metropolitana de Toluca (Spanish)
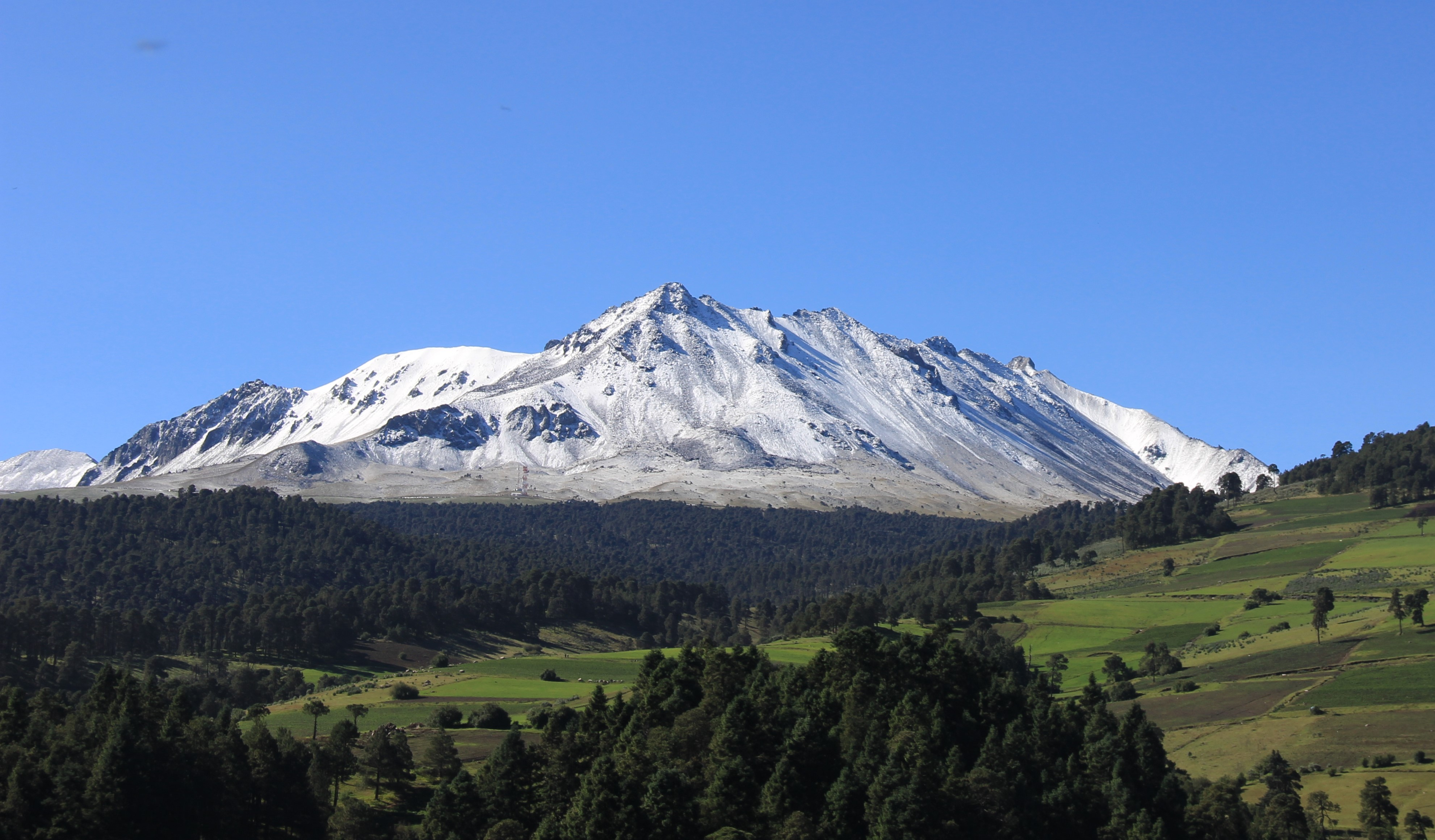
- Nevado de Toluca
Interactive Map of Toluca Metropolitan Area
City of Toluca / Ciudad de Toluca
Toluca Metro Area / Zona Metropolitana
- Country: Mexico
- State(s): Estado de México
- Largest city: Toluca
- Other cities: Almoloya de Juárez; Calimaya; Chapultepec; Lerma; Metepec; Mexicaltzingo; Ocoyoacac; Otzolotepec; Rayón; San Antonio la Isla; San Mateo Atenco; Temoaya; Tenango del Valle; Xonacatlán; Zinacantepec

Population (2020)
  - Total: 2,353,924
- Time zone: UTC−6 (CST)

Greater Toluca or the Metropolitan Area of Toluca is the conurbation formed by Toluca, as the core city, and 15 adjacent municipalities of the state of Mexico. The city of Toluca is just one of several cities and towns (called localidades in Mexico) that comprise the municipality of Toluca. The Municipality of Toluca, in 2020, had a population of around 910,608, whereas the population of the entire metropolitan area was 2.3 million, making it the fifth largest metropolitan area of Mexico after Greater Mexico City, Greater Guadalajara, Greater Monterrey, and Greater Puebla.

The Toluca Valley Metropolitan Area is a metropolitan area of Mexico located within the State of Mexico and composed of 16 municipalities. It is the second-largest metropolitan area in the state in terms of size and population. It is part of the megalopolis of Mexico.

The most important cities in the metropolitan area of the Toluca Valley are Toluca de Lerdo, Metepec, Zinacantepec, Lerma de Villada, and Tenango del Valle.

It is the closest metropolitan area to the Valley of Mexico, with 66 kilometers between the two. The economic growth of the city spans from its poles Zinacantepec, Tenango del Valle, and Lerma.

The metropolitan area of the Toluca Valley is the fifth largest city in Mexico, according to the 2020 Population and Housing Census of the National Institute of Statistics and Geography (INEGI).

== Municipalities that make up the Metropolitan Zone ==
According to the State Urban, Metropolitan and Housing Information System of the State of Mexico, the metropolitan area is made up of the municipalities of Almoloya de Juárez, Calimaya, Chapultepec, Lerma, Metepec, Mexicaltzingo, Ocoyoacac, Otzolotepec, Rayón, San Antonio la Isla, San Mateo Atenco, Temoaya, Tenango del Valle, Xonacatlán and Zinacantepec.

== Education ==
In the Metropolitan Region there are several universities, such as the Metropolitan Autonomous University Unidad Lerma (UAM-L), the Autonomous University of the State of Mexico (UAEMéx), Institute of Technology and Studies Superiors of Monterrey (ITESM), the Technological Institute of Toluca (TecNM Campus Toluca), campus of Universidad Tecnológica de México (UNITEC), Universidad del Valle de México (UVM), Instituto Universitario del Estado de México (IUEM), Technological University of the Toluca Valley (UTVT), among other institutions.

== See also ==
- Metropolitan Areas of Mexico
