= Municipalities of the State of Mexico =

List of municipalities of Mexican state

Map of Mexico with State of Mexico highlighted

Municipalities of Mexico State by code.

Mexico is a state in central Mexico that is divided into 125 municipalities. According to the 2020 INEGI census, it is the most populated state with 16,992,418 inhabitants and the 8th smallest by land area spanning 22,351.8 square kilometres (8,630.1 sq mi).

Municipalities in the State of Mexico are administratively autonomous of the state according to the 115th article of the 1917 Constitution of Mexico. Every three years, citizens elect a municipal president (Spanish: presidente municipal) by a plurality voting system who heads a concurrently elected municipal council (ayuntamiento) responsible for providing all the public services for their constituents. The municipal council consists of a variable number of trustees and councillors (regidores y síndicos). Municipalities are responsible for public services (such as water and sewerage), street lighting, public safety, traffic, and the maintenance of public parks, gardens and cemeteries. They may also assist the state and federal governments in education, emergency fire and medical services, environmental protection and maintenance of monuments and historical landmarks. Since 1984, they have had the power to collect property taxes and user fees, although more funds are obtained from the state and federal governments than from their own income.

The largest municipality by population is Ecatepec, with 1,645,352 residents (9.68% of the state's total), while the smallest is Papalotla with 4,862 residents. The largest municipality by land area is Tlatlaya which spans 788.60 km^{2} (304.48 sq mi), and the smallest is also Papalotla with 3.20 km^{2} (1.24 sq mi). The newest municipalities are Luvianos and San José del Rincón, established on January 1, 2002; and Tonanitla, created on July 25, 2003.

== Municipalities ==
Largest municipalities in the State of Mexico by population

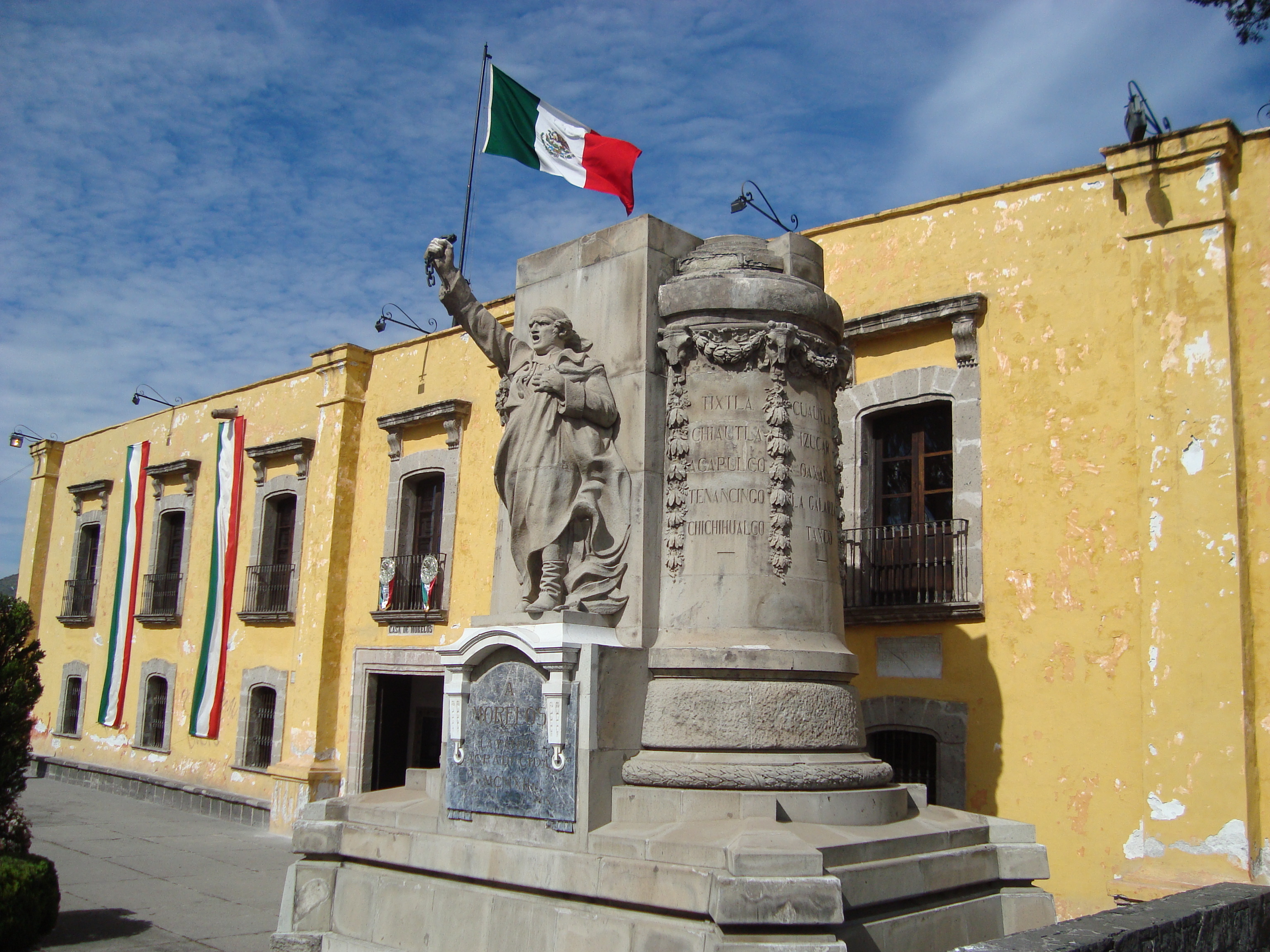
Ecatepec, largest municipality by population in the State of Mexico.

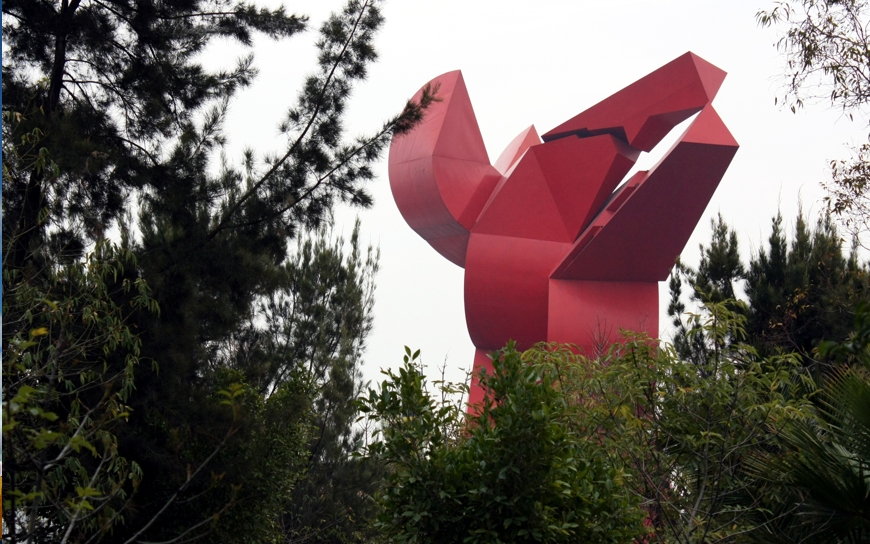
Nezahualcóyotl, second largest municipality by population.

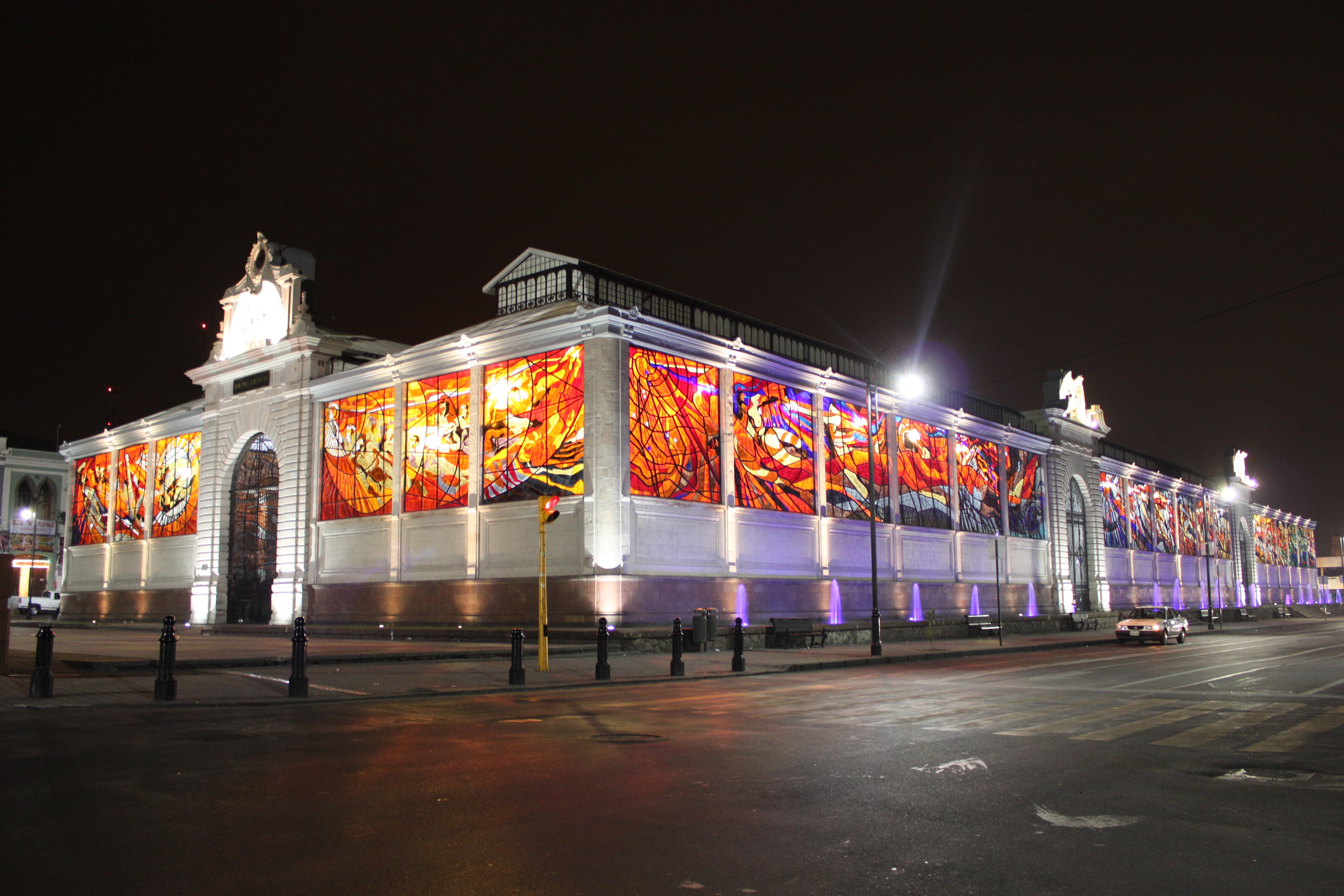
Toluca, capital and third largest municipality by population.

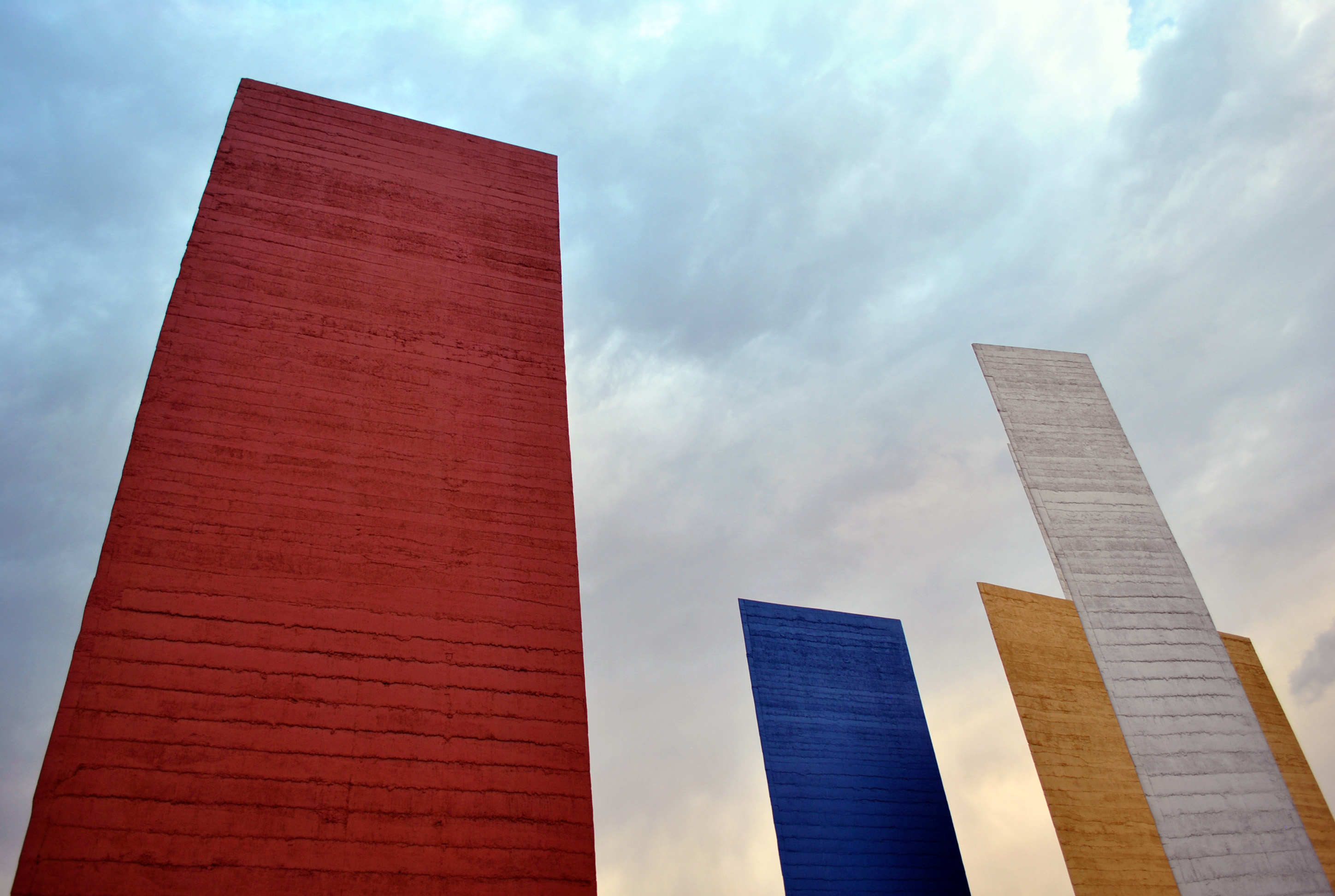
Naucalpan, fourth largest municipality by population.

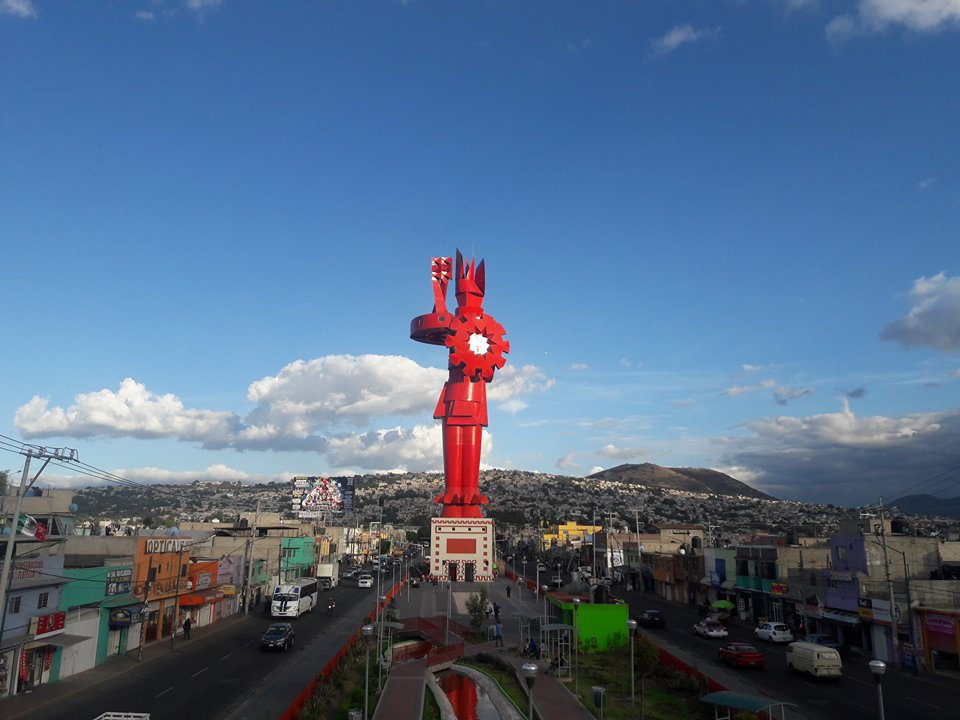
Chimalhuacán, fifth largest municipality by population.

† State capital

Municipalities of the State of Mexico
Name	Municipal seat	Population (2020)	Population (2010)	Change	Land area		Population density (2020)	Incorporation date
Name	Municipal seat	Population (2020)	Population (2010)	Change	km^{2}	sq mi	Population density (2020)	Incorporation date
Acambay de Ruíz Castañeda	Acambay	67,872	60,918	+11.4%	475.6	183.6	142.7/km^{2} (369.6/sq mi)	1827
Acolman	Acolman de Nezahualcóyotl	171,507	136,558	+25.6%	86.9	33.6	1,973.6/km^{2} (5,111.6/sq mi)	1826
Aculco	Aculco de Espinoza	49,266	44,823	+9.9%	453.3	175.0	108.7/km^{2} (281.5/sq mi)	1826
Almoloya de Alquisiras	Almoloya de Alquisiras	15,333	14,856	+3.2%	171.0	66.0	89.7/km^{2} (232.2/sq mi)	April 13, 1869
Almoloya de Juárez	Villa de Almoloya de Juárez	174,587	147,653	+18.2%	479.6	185.2	364.0/km^{2} (942.8/sq mi)	1826
Almoloya del Río	Almoloya del Río	12,694	10,886	+16.6%	9.2	3.6	1,379.8/km^{2} (3,573.6/sq mi)	March 26, 1847
Amanalco	Amanalco de Becerra	23,675	22,868	+3.5%	222.3	85.8	106.5/km^{2} (275.8/sq mi)	1826
Amatepec	Amatepec	25,244	26,334	−4.1%	636.3	245.7	39.7/km^{2} (102.8/sq mi)	1826
Amecameca (Note: Amecameca was originally incorporated as Ameca, changing its name on February 16, 1847.)	Amecameca de Juárez	53,441	48,421	+10.4%	176.4	68.1	303.0/km^{2} (784.6/sq mi)	1826
Apaxco	Apaxco de Ocampo	31,898	27,521	+15.9%	75.7	29.2	421.4/km^{2} (1,091.4/sq mi)	October 18, 1870
Atenco	San Salvador Atenco	75,489	56,243	+34.2%	87.6	33.8	861.7/km^{2} (2,231.9/sq mi)	1826
Atizapán	Santa Cruz Atizapán	12,984	10,299	+26.1%	8.5	3.3	1,527.5/km^{2} (3,956.3/sq mi)	October 18, 1870
Atizapán de Zaragoza (Note: Atizapán de Zaragoza was originally incorporated as Zaragoza, changing its name on October 4, 1969.)	Ciudad López Mateos	523,674	489,937	+6.9%	92.9	35.9	5,637.0/km^{2} (14,599.7/sq mi)	September 3, 1874
Atlacomulco	Atlacomulco de Fabela	109,384	93,718	+16.7%	258.1	99.7	423.8/km^{2} (1,097.6/sq mi)	1826
Atlautla	Atlautla de Victoria	31,900	27,663	+15.3%	167.7	64.7	190.2/km^{2} (492.7/sq mi)	October 12, 1874
Axapusco	Axapusco	29,128	25,559	+14.0%	286.5	110.6	101.7/km^{2} (263.3/sq mi)	1826
Ayapango	Ayapango de Gabriel Ramos Millán	10,053	8,864	+13.4%	50.7	19.6	198.3/km^{2} (513.6/sq mi)	May 13, 1868
Calimaya	Calimaya de Díaz González	68,489	47,033	+45.6%	103.0	39.8	664.9/km^{2} (1,722.2/sq mi)	1826
Capulhuac	Capulhuac de Mirafuentes	36,921	34,101	+8.3%	21.6	8.3	1,709.3/km^{2} (4,427.1/sq mi)	1828
Chalco	Chalco de Díaz Covarrubias	400,057	310,130	+29.0%	225.2	87.0	1,776.5/km^{2} (4,601.0/sq mi)	August 6, 1824
Chapa de Mota	Chapa de Mota	31,737	27,551	+15.2%	292.2	112.8	108.6/km^{2} (281.3/sq mi)	1826
Chapultepec	Chapultepec	12,772	9,676	+32.0%	11.6	4.5	1,101.0/km^{2} (2,851.7/sq mi)	October 8, 1869
Chiautla	Chiautla	30,045	26,191	+14.7%	20.1	7.8	1,494.8/km^{2} (3,871.5/sq mi)	1826
Chicoloapan	Chicoloapan de Juárez	200,750	175,053	+14.7%	41.3	15.9	4,860.8/km^{2} (12,589.3/sq mi)	1826
Chiconcuac	Chiconcuac	27,692	22,819	+21.4%	6.8	2.6	4,072.4/km^{2} (10,547.3/sq mi)	October 17, 1868
Chimalhuacán	Chimalhuacán	705,193	614,453	+14.8%	54.8	21.2	12,868.5/km^{2} (33,329.2/sq mi)	1852
Coacalco de Berriozábal	San Francisco Coacalco	293,444	278,064	+5.5%	35.0	13.5	8,384.1/km^{2} (21,714.8/sq mi)	February 12, 1862
Coatepec Harinas	Coatepec Harinas	38,643	36,174	+6.8%	289.2	111.7	133.6/km^{2} (346.1/sq mi)	1826
Cocotitlán	Cocotitlán	15,107	12,142	+24.4%	14.8	5.7	1,020.7/km^{2} (2,643.7/sq mi)	May 13, 1868
Coyotepec	Coyotepec	40,885	39,030	+4.8%	39.9	15.4	1,024.7/km^{2} (2,653.9/sq mi)	October 16, 1868
Cuautitlán	Cuautitlán	178,847	140,059	+27.7%	40.9	15.8	4,372.8/km^{2} (11,325.5/sq mi)	August 6, 1824
Cuautitlán Izcalli	Cuautitlán Izcalli	555,163	511,675	+8.5%	110.1	42.5	5,042.4/km^{2} (13,059.6/sq mi)	June 23, 1973
Donato Guerra (Note: Donato Guerra was originally incorporated as Asunción Malacatepec, changing its name on May 2, 1880.)	Villa Donato Guerra	37,436	33,455	+11.9%	191.6	74.0	195.4/km^{2} (506.0/sq mi)	October 16, 1868
Ecatepec de Morelos	San Cristóbal Ecatepec	1,645,352	1,656,107	−0.6%	156.2	60.3	10,533.6/km^{2} (27,282.0/sq mi)	August 6, 1824
Ecatzingo	Ecatzingo de Hidalgo	10,827	9,369	+15.6%	53.2	20.5	203.5/km^{2} (527.1/sq mi)	May 13, 1868
Huehuetoca	Huehuetoca	163,244	100,023	+63.2%	119.8	46.3	1,362.6/km^{2} (3,529.2/sq mi)	1826
Hueypoxtla	Hueypoxtla	46,757	39,864	+17.3%	234.5	90.5	199.4/km^{2} (516.4/sq mi)	1826
Huixquilucan	Huixquilucan de Degollado	284,965	242,167	+17.7%	141.2	54.5	1,715.1/km^{2} (4,442.0/sq mi)	1826
Isidro Fabela (Note: Isidro Fabela was originally incorporated as Santiago Tlazala, changing its name to Iturbide in 1919 and to its current name on April 8, 1970.)	Tlazala de Fabela	11,929	10,308	+15.7%	79.7	30.8	149.7/km^{2} (387.7/sq mi)	May 13, 1868
Ixtapaluca	Ixtapaluca	542,211	467,361	+16.0%	324.0	125.1	1,673.5/km^{2} (4,334.3/sq mi)	1826
Ixtapan de la Sal	Ixtapan de la Sal	36,911	33,541	+10.0%	115.1	44.4	320.7/km^{2} (830.6/sq mi)	1826
Ixtapan del Oro	Ixtapan del Oro	6,475	6,629	−2.3%	99.3	38.3	65.2/km^{2} (168.9/sq mi)	September 14, 1875
Ixtlahuaca	Ixtlahuaca de Rayón	160,139	141,482	+13.2%	335.5	129.5	477.3/km^{2} (1,236.2/sq mi)	August 6, 1824
Jaltenco	Jaltenco	28,217	26,328	+7.2%	4.7	1.8	6,003.6/km^{2} (15,549.3/sq mi)	1870
Jilotepec	Jilotepec de Molina Enríquez	87,671	83,755	+4.7%	568.4	219.5	154.2/km^{2} (399.5/sq mi)	March 11, 1824
Jilotzingo	Santa Ana Jilotzingo	19,877	17,970	+10.6%	116.5	45.0	170.6/km^{2} (441.9/sq mi)	1826
Jiquipilco	Jiquipilco	76,826	69,031	+11.3%	275.3	106.3	279.1/km^{2} (722.8/sq mi)	1826
Jocotitlán	Jocotitlán	69,264	61,204	+13.2%	277.7	107.2	249.4/km^{2} (646.0/sq mi)	1826
Joquicingo	Joquicingo de León Guzmán	15,428	12,840	+20.2%	46.1	17.8	334.7/km^{2} (866.8/sq mi)	1826
Juchitepec (Note: Juchitepec was originally incorporated as Juchi, changing its name on May 2, 1880. It was merged with Tenango del Aire for 2 months in 1899.)	Juchitepec de Mariano Rivapalacio	27,116	23,497	+15.4%	132.5	51.2	204.6/km^{2} (530.0/sq mi)	1826
Lerma	Lerma de Villada	170,327	134,799	+26.4%	230.8	89.1	738.0/km^{2} (1,911.4/sq mi)	August 6, 1824
Luvianos	Luvianos	28,822	27,781	+3.7%	702.9	271.4	41.0/km^{2} (106.2/sq mi)	January 1, 2002
Malinalco	Malinalco	28,155	25,624	+9.9%	210.0	81.1	134.1/km^{2} (347.2/sq mi)	August 6, 1824
Melchor Ocampo (Note: Melchor Ocampo was originally incorporated as San Miguel Tlaxomulco, changing its name on October 12, 1984.)	Melchor Ocampo	61,220	50,240	+21.9%	14.0	5.4	4,372.9/km^{2} (11,325.6/sq mi)	October 16, 1868
Metepec	Metepec	242,307	214,162	+13.1%	67.5	26.1	3,589.7/km^{2} (9,297.4/sq mi)	August 6, 1824
Mexicaltzingo	San Mateo Mexicaltzingo	13,807	11,712	+17.9%	11.7	4.5	1,180.1/km^{2} (3,056.4/sq mi)	October 8, 1868
Morelos (Note: Melchor Ocampo was originally incorporated as San Bartolomé de las Tunas, changing its name on September 17, 1918.)	San Bartolo Morelos	33,164	28,426	+16.7%	235.8	91.0	140.6/km^{2} (364.3/sq mi)	October 8, 1874
Naucalpan	Naucalpan de Juárez	834,434	833,779	+0.1%	157.9	61.0	5,284.6/km^{2} (13,687.0/sq mi)	1826
Nezahualcóyotl	Ciudad Nezahualcóyotl	1,077,208	1,110,565	−3.0%	63.3	24.4	17,017.5/km^{2} (44,075.1/sq mi)	April 20, 1963
Nextlalpan	Santa Ana Nextlalpan	57,082	34,374	+66.1%	54.7	21.1	1,043.5/km^{2} (2,702.8/sq mi)	1826
Nicolás Romero (Note: Nicolás Romero was originally incorporated as Azcapuzaltongo, changing its name on April 18, 1898.)	Nicolás Romero	430,601	366,602	+17.5%	232.5	89.8	1,852.0/km^{2} (4,796.8/sq mi)	1826
Nopaltepec	Nopaltepec	10,351	8,895	+16.4%	82.6	31.9	125.3/km^{2} (324.6/sq mi)	October 19, 1871
Ocoyoacac	Ocoyoacac	72,103	61,805	+16.7%	138.7	53.6	519.8/km^{2} (1,346.4/sq mi)	1826
Ocuilán	Ocuilán de Arteaga	36,223	31,803	+13.9%	385.9	149.0	93.9/km^{2} (243.1/sq mi)	October 18, 1870
El Oro	El Oro	36,937	34,446	+7.2%	147.1	56.8	251.1/km^{2} (650.3/sq mi)	1870
Otumba	Otumba de Gómez Farías	36,331	34,232	+6.1%	141.9	54.8	256.0/km^{2} (663.1/sq mi)	August 6, 1824
Otzoloapan	Otzoloapan	4,891	4,864	+0.6%	153.7	59.3	31.8/km^{2} (82.4/sq mi)	1826
Otzolotepec	Villa Cuauhtémoc	88,783	78,146	+13.6%	114.5	44.2	775.4/km^{2} (2,008.3/sq mi)	1826
Ozumba	Ozumba de Alzate	30,785	27,207	+13.2%	47.4	18.3	649.5/km^{2} (1,682.1/sq mi)	1826
Papalotla	Papalotla	4,862	4,147	+17.2%	3.2	1.2	1,519.4/km^{2} (3,935.2/sq mi)	1826
La Paz	Los Reyes Acaquilpan	304,088	253,845	+19.8%	37.1	14.3	8,196.4/km^{2} (21,228.7/sq mi)	February 17, 1899
Polotitlán	Polotitlán de la Ilustración	14,985	13,002	+15.3%	126.7	48.9	118.3/km^{2} (306.3/sq mi)	September 27, 1875
Rayón	Santa María Rayón	15,972	12,748	+25.3%	23.0	8.9	694.4/km^{2} (1,798.6/sq mi)	October 22, 1874
San Antonio la Isla	San Antonio la Isla	31,962	22,152	+44.3%	25.3	9.8	1,263.3/km^{2} (3,272.0/sq mi)	March 16, 1847
San Felipe del Progreso (Note: San Felipe del Progreso was originally incorporated as San Felipe del Obraje, changing its name on October 13, 1877.)	San Felipe del Progreso	144,924	121,396	+19.4%	368.7	142.4	393.1/km^{2} (1,018.0/sq mi)	1826
San José del Rincón	San José del Rincón	100,082	91,345	+9.6%	478.5	184.7	209.2/km^{2} (541.7/sq mi)	January 1, 2002
San Martín de las Pirámides (Note: San Martín de las Pirámides was originally incorporated as San Martín Obispo, changing its name on December 8, 1917.)	San Martín de las Pirámides	29,182	24,851	+17.4%	69.9	27.0	417.5/km^{2} (1,081.3/sq mi)	October 16, 1873
San Mateo Atenco	San Mateo Atenco	97,418	72,579	+34.2%	21.0	8.1	4,639.0/km^{2} (12,014.8/sq mi)	March 16, 1847
San Simón	San Simón de Guerrero	6,692	6,272	+6.7%	130.8	50.5	51.2/km^{2} (132.5/sq mi)	October 13, 1881
Santo Tomás	Santo Tomás de los Plátanos	9,729	9,111	+6.8%	107.7	41.6	90.3/km^{2} (234.0/sq mi)	1870
Soyaniquilpan de Juárez	San Francisco Soyaniquilpan	14,323	11,798	+21.4%	146.6	56.6	97.7/km^{2} (253.0/sq mi)	September 12, 1872
Sultepec	Sultepec de Pedro Ascencio Alquisiras	24,145	25,809	−6.4%	566.1	218.6	42.7/km^{2} (110.5/sq mi)	April 8, 1825
Tecámac	Tecámac de Felipe Villanueva	547,503	364,579	+50.2%	156.9	60.6	3,489.5/km^{2} (9,037.8/sq mi)	1826
Tejupilco	Tejupilco de Hidalgo	79,282	71,077	+11.5%	668.4	258.1	118.6/km^{2} (307.2/sq mi)	April 8, 1825
Temamatla	Temamatla	14,130	11,206	+26.1%	29.2	11.3	483.9/km^{2} (1,253.3/sq mi)	1852
Temascalapa	Temascalapa	43,593	35,987	+21.1%	164.6	63.6	264.8/km^{2} (685.9/sq mi)	1826
Temascalcingo	Temascalcingo de José María Velasco	66,414	62,695	+5.9%	356.2	137.5	186.5/km^{2} (482.9/sq mi)	1826
Temascaltepec	Temascaltepec de González	35,014	32,870	+6.5%	568.3	219.4	61.6/km^{2} (159.6/sq mi)	August 6, 1824
Temoaya	Temoaya	105,766	90,010	+17.5%	186.3	71.9	567.7/km^{2} (1,470.4/sq mi)	1826
Tenancingo	Tenancingo de Degollado	104,677	90,946	+15.1%	164.6	63.6	635.9/km^{2} (1,647.1/sq mi)	April 8, 1825
Tenango del Aire	Tenango del Aire	11,359	10,578	+7.4%	38.0	14.7	298.9/km^{2} (774.2/sq mi)	1826
Tenango del Valle	Tenango de Arista	90,518	77,965	+16.1%	211.1	81.5	428.8/km^{2} (1,110.6/sq mi)	August 6, 1824
Teoloyucan (Note: Teoloyucan was originally incorporated as Toloyuca, changing its name on October 16, 1868.)	Teoloyucan	65,459	63,115	+3.7%	31.0	12.0	2,111.6/km^{2} (5,469.0/sq mi)	1826
Teotihuacán	Teotihuacán de Arista	58,507	53,010	+10.4%	83.2	32.1	703.2/km^{2} (1,821.3/sq mi)	August 6, 1824
Tepetlaoxtoc	Tepetlaoxtoc	32,564	27,944	+16.5%	178.9	69.1	182.0/km^{2} (471.4/sq mi)	May 2, 1827
Tepetlixpa	Tepetlixpa	20,500	18,327	+11.9%	43.1	16.6	475.6/km^{2} (1,231.9/sq mi)	August 31, 1869
Tepotzotlán	Tepotzotlán	103,696	88,559	+17.1%	207.1	80.0	500.7/km^{2} (1,296.8/sq mi)	1826
Tequixquiac	Santiago Tequixquiac	39,489	33,907	+16.5%	122.5	47.3	322.4/km^{2} (834.9/sq mi)	1826
Texcaltitlán	Texcaltitlán	18,482	17,390	+6.3%	145.5	56.2	127.0/km^{2} (329.0/sq mi)	November 4, 1861
Texcalyacac	San Mateo Texcalyacac	5,736	5,111	+12.2%	24.7	9.5	232.2/km^{2} (601.5/sq mi)	1870
Texcoco	Texcoco de Mora	277,562	235,151	+18.0%	428.1	165.3	648.4/km^{2} (1,679.2/sq mi)	August 6, 1824
Tezoyuca	Tezoyuca	47,044	35,199	+33.7%	16.3	6.3	2,886.1/km^{2} (7,475.1/sq mi)	April 23, 1864
Tianguistenco	Santiago Tianguistenco	84,259	70,682	+19.2%	131.8	50.9	639.3/km^{2} (1,655.8/sq mi)	1826
Timilpan	San Andrés Timilpan	16,414	15,391	+6.6%	166.7	64.4	98.5/km^{2} (255.0/sq mi)	1870
Tlalmanalco	Tlalmanalco de Velázquez	49,196	46,130	+6.6%	160.2	61.9	307.1/km^{2} (795.4/sq mi)	1826
Tlalnepantla de Baz	Tlalnepantla	672,202	664,225	+1.2%	80.4	31.0	8,360.7/km^{2} (21,654.2/sq mi)	July 18, 1825
Tlatlaya	Tlatlaya	31,762	32,997	−3.7%	788.6	304.5	40.3/km^{2} (104.3/sq mi)	September 21, 1849
Toluca	Toluca de Lerdo†	910,608	819,561	+11.1%	426.8	164.8	2,133.6/km^{2} (5,525.9/sq mi)	August 6, 1824
Tonanitla	Santa María Tonanitla	14,883	10,216	+45.7%	9.0	3.5	1,653.7/km^{2} (4,283.0/sq mi)	July 25, 2003
Tonatico	Tonatico	12,912	12,099	+6.7%	90.2	34.8	143.1/km^{2} (370.8/sq mi)	October 18, 1870
Tultepec	Tultepec	157,645	91,808	+71.7%	26.8	10.3	5,882.3/km^{2} (15,235.0/sq mi)	1852
Tultitlán	Tultitlán de Mariano Escobedo	516,341	524,074	−1.5%	66.0	25.5	7,823.3/km^{2} (20,262.4/sq mi)	1826
Valle de Bravo (Note: Valle de Bravo was originally incorporated as San Francisco del Valle de Temascaltepec, changing its name to Villa de Valle in 1849 and to its current name on September 17, 1919.)	Valle de Bravo	61,590	61,599	0.0%	400.6	154.7	153.7/km^{2} (398.2/sq mi)	1826
Valle de Chalco	Xico	391,731	357,645	+9.5%	46.7	18.0	8,388.2/km^{2} (21,725.5/sq mi)	November 9, 1994
Villa de Allende	San José Villa de Allende	53,275	47,709	+11.7%	309.5	119.5	172.1/km^{2} (445.8/sq mi)	1826
Villa del Carbón	Villa del Carbón	51,498	44,881	+14.7%	303.3	117.1	169.8/km^{2} (439.8/sq mi)	1826
Villa Guerrero (Note: Villa Guerrero was originally incorporated as Tecualoya, changing its name on September 17, 1919.)	Villa Guerrero	69,086	59,991	+15.2%	226.1	87.3	305.6/km^{2} (791.4/sq mi)	1826
Villa Victoria (Note: Villa Victoria was originally incorporated as Merced de las Llaves, changing its name on September 17, 1919.)	Villa Victoria	108,196	94,369	+14.7%	424.8	164.0	254.7/km^{2} (659.7/sq mi)	May 13, 1868
Xalatlaco	Xalatlaco	30,687	26,865	+14.2%	108.2	41.8	476.0/km^{2} (1,232.7/sq mi)	October 12, 1874
Xonacatlán	Xonacatlán	54,633	46,331	+17.9%	53.5	20.7	1,021.2/km^{2} (2,644.8/sq mi)	October 18, 1870
Zacazonapan	Zacazonapan	5,109	4,051	+26.1%	66.7	25.8	76.6/km^{2} (198.4/sq mi)	April 5, 1879
Zacualpan	Zacualpan	13,522	15,121	−10.6%	292.1	112.8	46.3/km^{2} (119.9/sq mi)	August 6, 1824
Zinacantepec	San Miguel Zinacantepec	203,872	167,759	+21.5%	310.4	119.8	656.8/km^{2} (1,701.1/sq mi)	1826
Zumpahuacán	Zumpahuacán	18,833	16,365	+15.1%	202.4	78.1	93.0/km^{2} (241.0/sq mi)	October 15, 1875
Zumpango	Zumpango de Ocampo	280,455	159,647	+75.7%	223.6	86.3	1,254.3/km^{2} (3,248.5/sq mi)	August 6, 1824
State of Mexico	—	16,992,418	15,175,862	+12.0%	22,351.8	8,630.1	760.2/km^{2} (1,969.0/sq mi)	—
Mexico	—	126,014,024	112,336,538	+12.2%	1,960,646.7	757,010	64.3/km^{2} (166.5/sq mi)	—
