= Río de los Remedios =

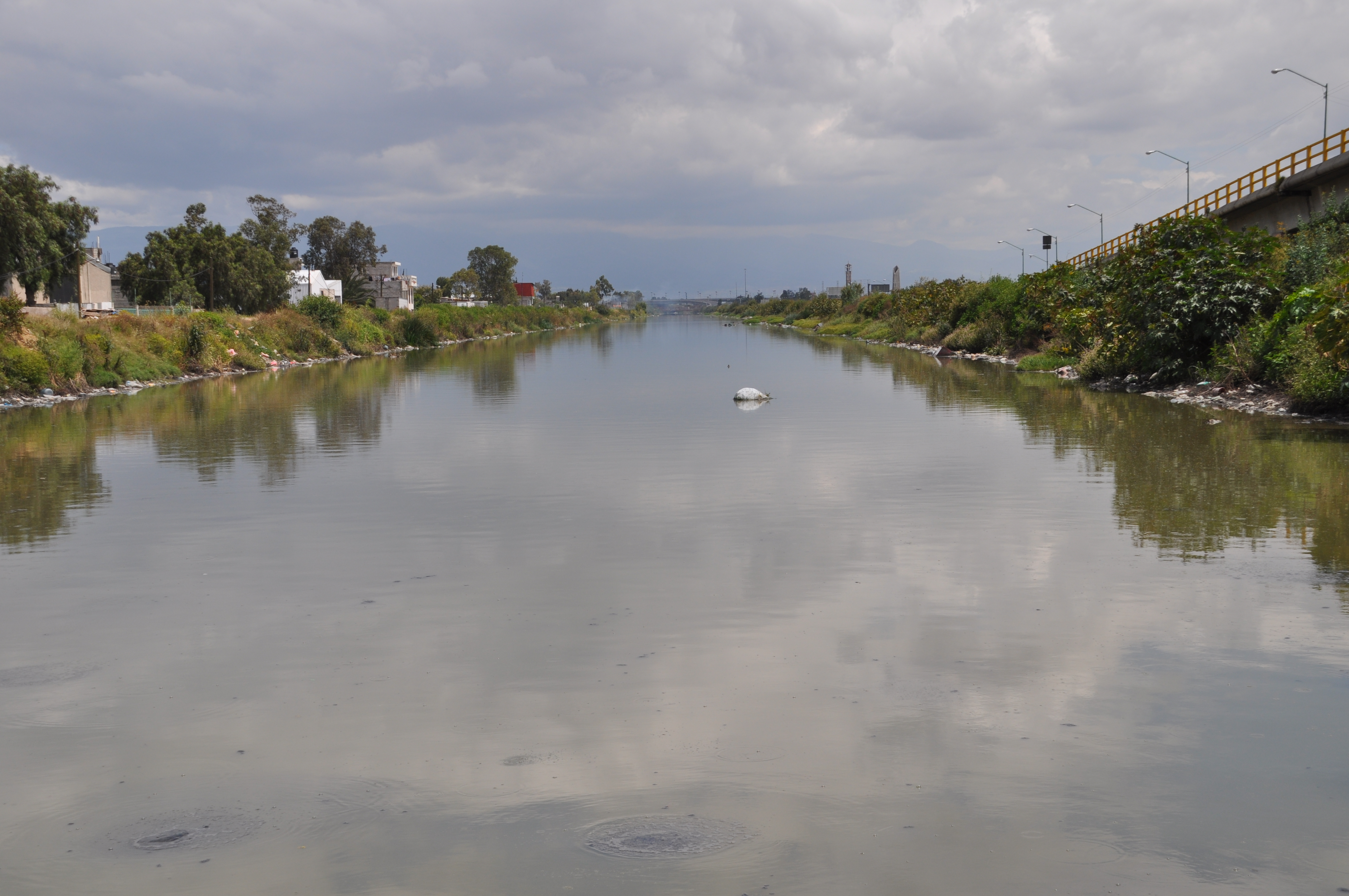

Location
- Country: Mexico
- State: State of Mexico, Mexico City

Río de los Remedios (Remedios River) is a 15.7 km long tributary shared by Mexico City and the State of Mexico, flowing through the boroughs of Gustavo A. Madero and Azcapotzalco, in Mexico City, and the municipalities of Naucalpan de Juárez, Tlalnepantla de Baz, Ecatepec de Morelos and Nezahualcóyotl, in the State of Mexico.
