= Óscar García Guzmán =

Mexican serial killer (born 1990)

- Born: 1990 (age 35–36); Toluca, Mexico
- Other name: "The Monster of Toluca"
- Conviction: Murder
- Penalty: 217 years and six months

Details
- Victims: 6 confirmed
- Span of crimes: 2006–2019
- Country: Mexico
- State: State of Mexico
- Date apprehended: December 6, 2019

Óscar García Guzmán (born 1990), known as The Monster of Toluca, is a Mexican serial killer. He was first identified as a suspect in the disappearance of an undergraduate student on October 30, 2019, when, after searching his home in Villa Santin, Toluca, State of Mexico, police officers found the strangled bodies of three women, two of which were buried in his backyard and the other was hidden in his bathroom. García Guzmán fled from the police and boasted that he would continue to kill women unless his pets' safety was guaranteed, though he was arrested in Mexico City on December 6, 2019, by the Attorney General's Office. After his capture, he admitted to the killing of not only the three women found in his home, but also to the murders of a girl and her father in Otzolotepec in 2012 and to the murder of his own father in 2006, when he was just 16 years old; the prosecution has confirmed these three further confessions. García Guzmán was sentenced by the Attorney General of the State of Mexico to prison. He had previously been sentenced to 12 years in September 2021 for the crime of rape, however, after further investigation, he was sentenced to an additional 17 years for his responsibility in the disappearance of a woman. Finally, on March 31, 2022, he received another sentence for 62 more years, after being convicted of the murder of a 23-year-old woman. The total sum of his 3 first convictions gave him a total of 91 years in prison, however, after admitting to more murders during a call to his mother, he was charged with three additional sentences, in total, he has been condemned to 217 years and six months in jail.

== Background ==
Little is known about García Guzmán's early life before his crimes, although there have been claims that his father was abusive to García Guzmán and his mother.

Though García Guzmán has declared that he was attracted to the idea of killing in his youth, unlike many other serial killers, he has also shown a great interest and attachment to animals. At the time of his capture, García Guzmán kept two dogs and a cat as pets, and expressed great concern for their well-being during his time in jail. According to Dr. Feggy Ostrosky, his inclination towards animals could be a result of pathological narcissism, in which García Guzmán sees himself as a "protector"; by taking care of animals he can fulfill his desire for power without any resistance from his subordinates. Dr. Ostrosky considers García Guzmán to be a psychopath and a narcissist, who is eager for attention.

Prior to his capture, García Guzmán's hobbies were krav maga, which he actively practised for at least four years, death metal, and satanism; García Guzmán also enjoyed stories about serial killers, saying he admired them for their "intelligence". Although he had lived alone for years, García Guzmán was financially dependent on his mother, and neighbors described him as a quiet man who never spoke to anyone and always dressed in black. At the time of his capture, he was studying psychology at UNITEC.

== Murders ==
=== Initial killings ===
García Guzmán's first victim was his own father, whom he murdered at 16 years of age in 2006. He confessed to the crime during a phone call to his mother from prison in January 2020. Eventually, he formally admitted his guilt of the crime to the prosecution. While the circumstances surrounding his father's death have not been disclosed to the public, the prosecution has confirmed that García Guzmán was indeed responsible.

His second and third victims were a man identified only as "Tomás" and the man's daughter, identified only as "Mónica", respectively. García Guzmán first encountered Mónica on September 10, 2012, at a high school in Otzolotepec, where he quickly became infatuated with the girl and began stalking her. He went to her house and decided to rifle through her belongings, unaware that the girl's father, Tomás, was there. After being discovered by the latter, García Guzmán decided to kill him, stabbing the man repeatedly and finishing him off with an axe. He then waited for Mónica to return, with Tomás' remains still in the house. When she arrived, García Guzmán subdued her using krav maga and took her to his house in Villa Santin, where he kept the girl alive for two weeks, repeatedly sexually assaulting and torturing her, before ending her life by beating her to death two days before her birthday. He then dismembered her body, put the remains in cardboard boxes, and threw them in a ravine in El Mirador, Mexico City.

=== Fourth and fifth murders ===
García Guzmán's fourth victim was Adriana González Hernández, a 27-year-old psychology student at the Insurgentes University of Toluca, who disappeared on March 24, 2017, after leaving her home in the El Ranchito neighborhood in Toluca. According to relatives, a few days before Hernández's disappearance, she presented García Guzmán as her "boyfriend" at a family gathering. García Guzmán later confessed to activist Frida Guerrera Villalvazo that he kept Hernández alive until February 2018.

His fifth victim was Martha Patricia "Patty" Nava Sotelo, a 25-year-old criminology and law student who disappeared on February 9, 2019, in Huixquilucan. Months before she vanished, Nava expressed concerns to her family that somebody was following her, in particular, the driver of a black truck. It is believed that García Guzmán was familiar with the Nava family, as his victim's mother was his neighbor. After her disappearance, Nava's final cell phone reception was determined to be near García Guzmán's Villa Santin house. She was held captive under the effects of Rivotril (a brand of clonazepam) for several days until her death sometime later that same month.

=== Final murder ===
The last victim was Jéssica Guadalupe Orihuela, a 23-year-old psychology student studying at UNITEC with García Guzmán, who disappeared on October 24, 2019, after leaving her home in Colonia. García Guzmán had reportedly begun harassing her months before her abduction. When Orihuela vanished, her family believed that García Guzmán was responsible; they went to his house on several occasions to speak with him, but García Guzmán repeatedly denied having seen Orihuela and ended up threatening them if they didn't "stop bothering him." Family members remained outside the house beginning on October 26, claiming that they saw Orihuela through the windows. However, the police were unable to act on the family's claims without a court order, which took until October 30 to arrive. The police entered the house on that date, but by then, García Guzmán had fled. While examining the house, they found Jéssica's strangled body in the bathroom. She had reportedly been killed just hours prior to discovery.

=== Eventual arrest ===
After evading capture following the police search of his home on October 30, 2019, García Guzmán taunted authorities over social media for their failure to arrest him. He also threatened to continue killing more women if the authorities were not able to return his pets and/or guarantee their safety. García Guzmán was captured on December 6, 2019, in the Cascos de Santo Tomás neighborhood in Mexico City, after he was located by agents of the Attorney General's Office after he connected to public wifi during a music festival.

== See also ==
- List of serial killers by country
