= Zacazonapan =

- Municipality
- Coat of arms
- Interactive map of Zacazonapan
- Coordinates: 19°04′22″N 100°15′18″W
- Country: Mexico
- State: State of Mexico
- Municipal Seat: Zacazonapan

Government
  - Municipal president: José Luis Narciso Cabrera (2006-2009) (PAN)
- Time zone: UTC-6 (CST)

Zacazonapan (pronounced sah-kah-soh-NAH-pahn) is a municipality near Mexico City. Its municipal seat is the village of Zacazonapan. The name comes from Nahuatl and roughly translates to "in the River of the Dry Corn plants".

== The village ==
The area was settled by the Matlatzincas who were conquered by the Aztecs, making the area a border zone between the Aztec Empire and Purépecha lands. After the fall of the Aztec Empire by the Spaniards, the area was subdued by Andrés de Tapia and Gonzalo de Sandoval. They, among other conquistadors they exploited the area's mineral deposits making it part of the “Real de Minas de Temascaltepec” (today Valle de Bravo). Large haciendas dedicated to growing crops and raising cattle were established here as well. Evangelization was carried out by Franciscans, who were followed by Spanish families bringing sugar cane and fruit trees to plant. In 1521, Zacazonapan was included in the Indian Republic of Tmascaltepec. The modern village of Zacazonapan has its roots in a hacienda known as Santa Maria. It was very important to the development of the area because of the irrigation system it constructed on its lands, which constituted much of what is now the municipality.

The village of Zacazonapan originally belonged to the municipality of Otzoloapan. After arriving in the late 19th century, and receiving a warm welcome, General Juan N. Mirafuentes started a movement to make the village a municipal seat separate from Otzoloapan. This was accomplished on April 5, 1879, with C. Juan de Dios Villafaña Salinas as the first municipal president.

The area saw fighting during the Mexican Revolution, but many families hid or moved away during the conflict. During the Cristero War, the area saw fighting as well including the capture and execution of three prominent Cristero priests.

As a municipal seat in the State of Mexico, Zacazonapan was remodeled by Carlos Hank González in 1974.

The population of the modern town as of 2005 was 2,718. The nearby ex-hacienda of Santa Maria, constructed in the 16th century was declared a historic monument by the National Institute of Anthropology and History in 1994 as well as the house of Victoriano Arroyo Garibay, constructed in 1900 due to its architecture. There are also unexplored archeological sites in the surrounding municipality.

The town has a song written about it, written by Rubén Méndez del Castillo, which won second place in a song contest in the state capital of Toluca in 1972.

== The municipality ==
As municipal seat, the village of Zacazonapan is the governing authority for the following communities: Alcantarilla, La Cañada, Naranjo, El Potrero, Santa María, Tizapa, Temascal, Arrastradero, El Puente, El Puerto, and Cerro Pelón along with 15 unnamed settlements. The population of the entire municipality is 3,836.

It is bordered by the municipalities of Otzoloapan, Tejupilco Temascaltepec and Valle de Bravo. The municipality has a territory of 67.14 square km.

The municipality borders the edge of the Sierra Madre del Sur giving it an uneven landscape with elevations such as the Cerro(hill) de La Pila, Cerro Sombrero, and Cerro Pelón. However, to the north there are also notable cerros such as El Xomil, Peña Colorada, and Peñas del Fraile. The most important river is the Temascaltepec, because of its year-round flow and as it receives the seasonal flow from arroyos such as the Zacazonapan, La Papaya and San José. There is also a series of freshwater springs.

In the mid 20th century, the economy of the municipality was based on fishing, agriculture and the production of piloncillo, a sugar cane product used for seasoning. Agriculture (corn, tomato and husk tomato) and fish farming are still the main occupations. The only other significant economic activity, providing a significant number of jobs, is realized by Minera Tizapa, S.A. de C.V., which mines zinc, lead and copper, with small amounts of gold and silver.
