= Calimaya =

- Town & Municipality
- Calimaya de Díaz González
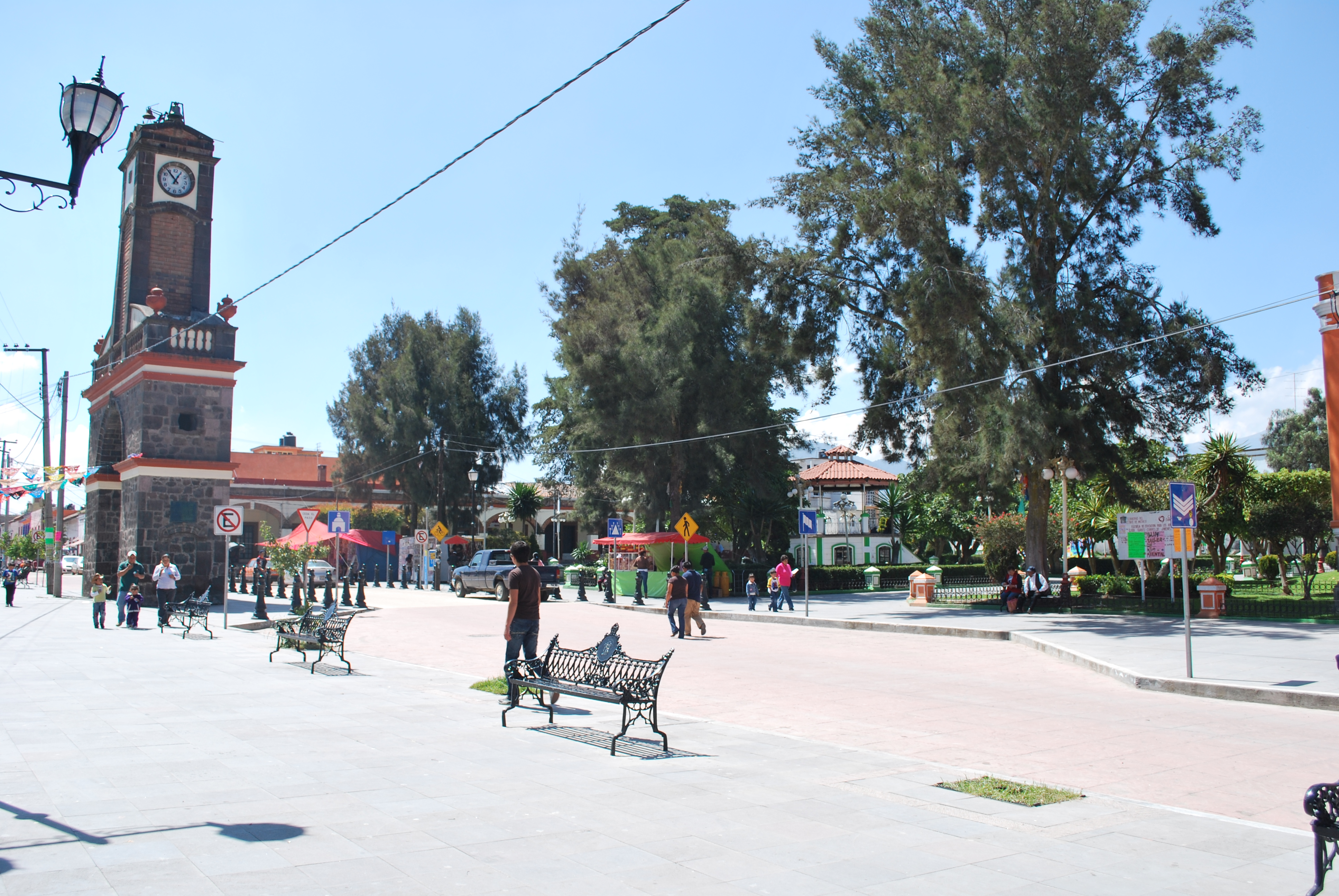
- Clock tower and plaza

- Coat of arms
- Interactive map of Calimaya
- Coordinates: 19°09′39″N 99°37′02″W
- Country: Mexico
- State: State of Mexico
- Founded: 800 CE
- Municipal Status: 1824

Government
  - Municipal President: Irad Mercado Avila 2009-2012

Area
  - Municipality: 103.11 km^{2} (39.81 sq mi)
- Elevation (of seat): 2,690 m (8,830 ft)

Population (2010) Municipality
  - Municipality: 47,033
  - Seat: 6,726
- Time zone: UTC-6 (Central)
- Postal code (of seat): 52200
- Area code: 722
- Website: calimaya.gob.mx

Calimaya is a town and municipality located just south of Toluca, the capital of the State of Mexico in central Mexico. The settlement was probably established around 800 BCE, when the city of Teotenango was in existence. It remained an important town through the colonial period, part of the vast lands held by a family which came to be known as the Counts of Calimaya. The town is home to one of the oldest examples of an open chapel in the State of Mexico. Today, the municipality is still mostly agricultural but there has been a rapid construction of housing divisions, changing parts of it from rural to suburban.

== The town ==
The town of Calimaya is located south of the city of Toluca in the Valley of Toluca. It is divided into five neighborhoods: Los Angeles, El Calvario, San Martin, Gualupita and San Juan. The town centers on a square called the Plaza de Kiosko which is flanked by the municipal palace, a set of arches that contains businesses and the Casa de Cultura. This “culture house” contains old documents and archeological pieces, as well as the municipal library, which was opened in 1986.

The plaza area is bordered on the east by Juárez Street. Directly across this street is the clock tower and the former Franciscan monastery and current parish church. The clock tower was built in 1910, as part of preparations for the Centennial of Mexico's Independence.

The parish of San Pedro y San Pablo is part of a former Franciscan monastery complex mostly constructed between 1529 and 1594. It is one of the most complete former monasteries to survive from the 16th century in the Valley of Toluca. The complex consists of a main church, an open chapel, a baptistery, a chapel called the Capillas de la Tercera Orden and an atrium with some remaining chapels. The main church contains an altarpiece from the 16th century with an image called “El Señor del Cuerito” (The Lord of the Leather), which is an image painted on leather, which was considered very miraculous a long time ago. It also contains a painting called La Madre María de la Luz by Miguel Cabrera.

The open chapel and baptistery area is the oldest surviving part of the complex. The chapel is believed to have been built in 1529 by the Franciscans that came to evangelize the area and one of the first of its kind in New Spain. One unusual characteristic of the chapel is that the four arches are asymmetrical. It has been listed as a historic monument by INAH as it combines European and indigenous elements. The baptistery contains the originally 16th-century font. Despite its importance historically, the open chapel is the least visited monument in the State of Mexico. The main reason is that it is not as well known as contemporaries such as the monastery in Acolman.

The municipal market was opened in 1998.

== The municipality ==
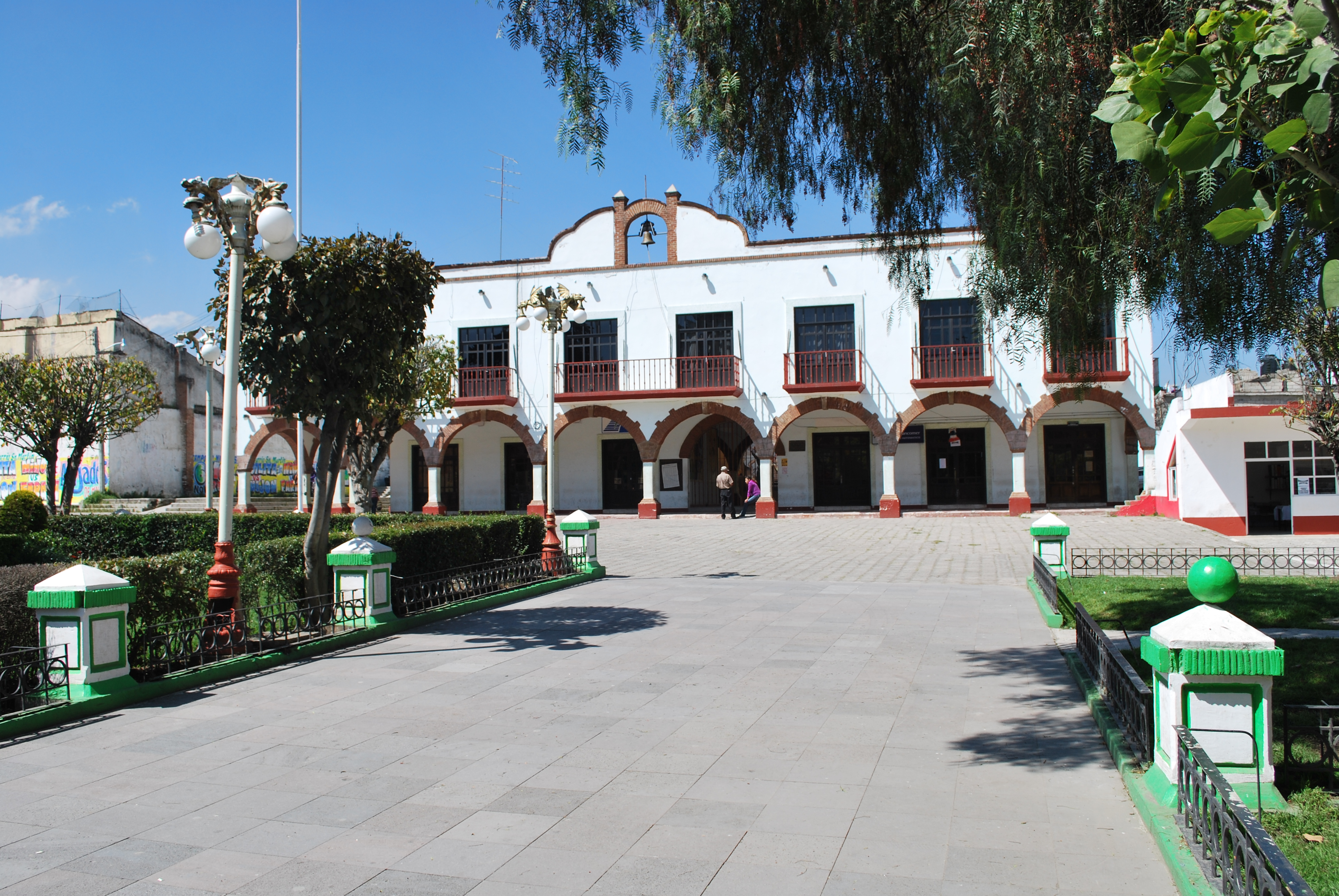
View of the municipal palace from the main plaza

The municipality of Calimaya consists of the seat and twenty-nine other communities. Outside of the seat, the main communities are: Concepción Coatipac, San Bartolito Tlaltelolco, San Andrés Ocotlán, San Diego de la Huerta, San Lorenzo Cuauhtenco, San Marcos de la Cruz, Santa María Nativitas and Zaragoza de Guadalupe. The municipality is part of the metropolitan area of Toluca, located south of the city. It borders the municipalities of Toluca, Metepec, Mexicalzingo, Chapultepec, Tianguistenco, San Antonio la Isla, Tenango del Valle and Santa María Rayón.

From 2008 to 2011, population and housing have increased significantly. The population rose from 38,770 in 2005 to 47,033 in 2010. The number of housing units have increased from 7,464 in 2005 to 10,589 in 2010. This increase is mostly due to the construction of housing developments in the municipality from 2008 to 2011. In this period, developers have added 11,373 units to the 7,151 that existed before. The new developments are changing the municipality from rural to suburban, and the municipality cannot keep up with services. From 2000 to 2010, the population has grown from 35,166 to 47,033 a 33% increase.

There are no major indigenous communities in the municipality with only 108 people speaking any kind indigenous language, mostly Mazahua and Otomi.

There are 41 schools in the municipality from preschool to high school level. There are thirteen preschools, seventeen primary schools, eight middle schools, two distance learning middle schools (telesecundaria), and one high school/preparatory school. There are also two job training centers and a day care center.

The municipality is considered to have a low level of socioeconomic marginalization. Over 95% of the population has basic services such as sewerage, running water and electricity; however, in 85% of the municipality, drainage is insufficient, and police coverage is sparse. 93% of the surface area is used for agriculture, livestock and forestry, with the rest being residential areas or mining.

Just over thirty percent of the working population is dedicated to agriculture and forestry. The main crop is corn. There is only one location that produces livestock (cattle) in any quantity. The municipality, along with federal authorities, has been promoting fish farming operation with the aim of generating jobs in rural areas. Much of this is for the pet market locally and later for export to the United States. The water used to raise the fish is then reused in greenhouse operations.

Industry consists of small workshops and one factory producing clothing. Workshops produce tubes, cinderblock, bathroom fixtures and food processing such as corn for tortillas. Mining of sand, gravel and other construction materials is more important. Just over thirty percent of the working population is dedicated to mining and manufacturing. Mineral resources consist of those used for construction such as sand and gravel. According to the municipal president about half of the municipality's mines, which generate about four thousand jobs directly or indirectly, are not in compliance with environmental laws. This is particularly true of those that extract tepojal, a volcanic stone used in construction.

The municipality has 978 commercial enterprises in 88 concentrations. Most are dedicated to local, primary needs such as food. Most commerce centers on the municipal seat with its municipal market and traditional Thursday tianguis, which has operated since the 16th century. This sector of the economy is growing as the population grows. Thirty-nine percent of the working population is dedicated to commerce and services.

== Zacango Zoo ==
The municipality is home to one of the largest and most important zoos in Latin America, located on the former Zacango Hacienda. Dating from the first half of the 17th century, the hacienda was important not only for agriculture but also as a stopping point for mule trains as well as a commercial center. Today, its forty-eight acres are dedicated to about 1500 animals from 250 species in enclosures meant to imitate the creatures’ natural habitats. The property has a number of services including a library, museum, education center, auditorium, “ecological house”, chapel, as well as an area with restaurants and souvenir stands. The center has a large artificial lake with boats for rent. There is a “children's zoo” which allows for the petting of the animals there, including the recently born ones. It offers camps for children, which includes activities such as preparing food for the animals, and tours at night focusing on nocturnal species. The zoo has breeding programs of endangered species, whose successes include the birth of thirty-three reptiles in 2010. In 2011, the zoo performed surgery on a ten-year-old Bengal tiger, whose lumbar was damaged during a fall at a Cancun zoo. This involved the successful transplanting of stem cells to the damaged area, the first done on a wild species.

== History ==
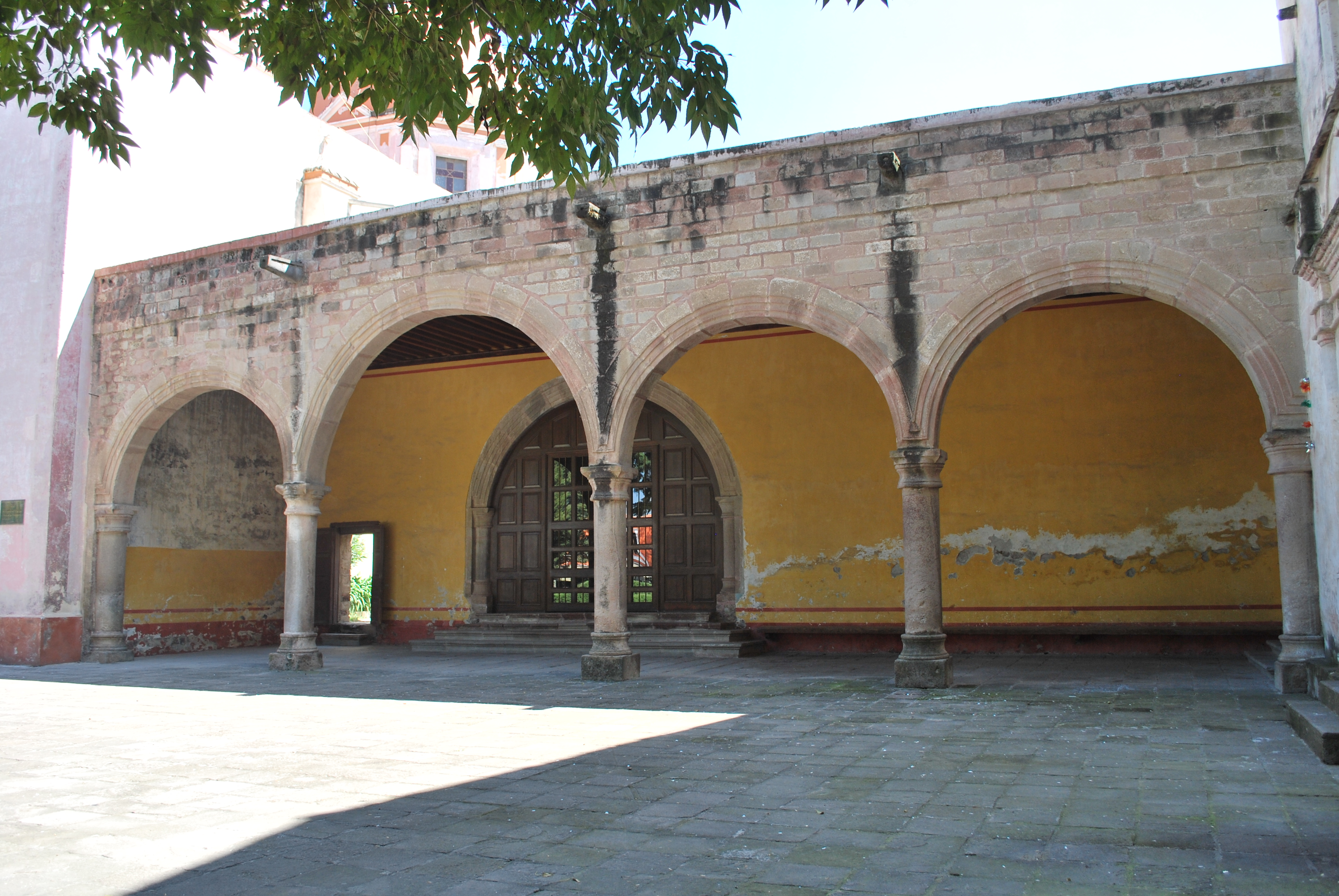
View of the open chapel at the former Franciscan monastery

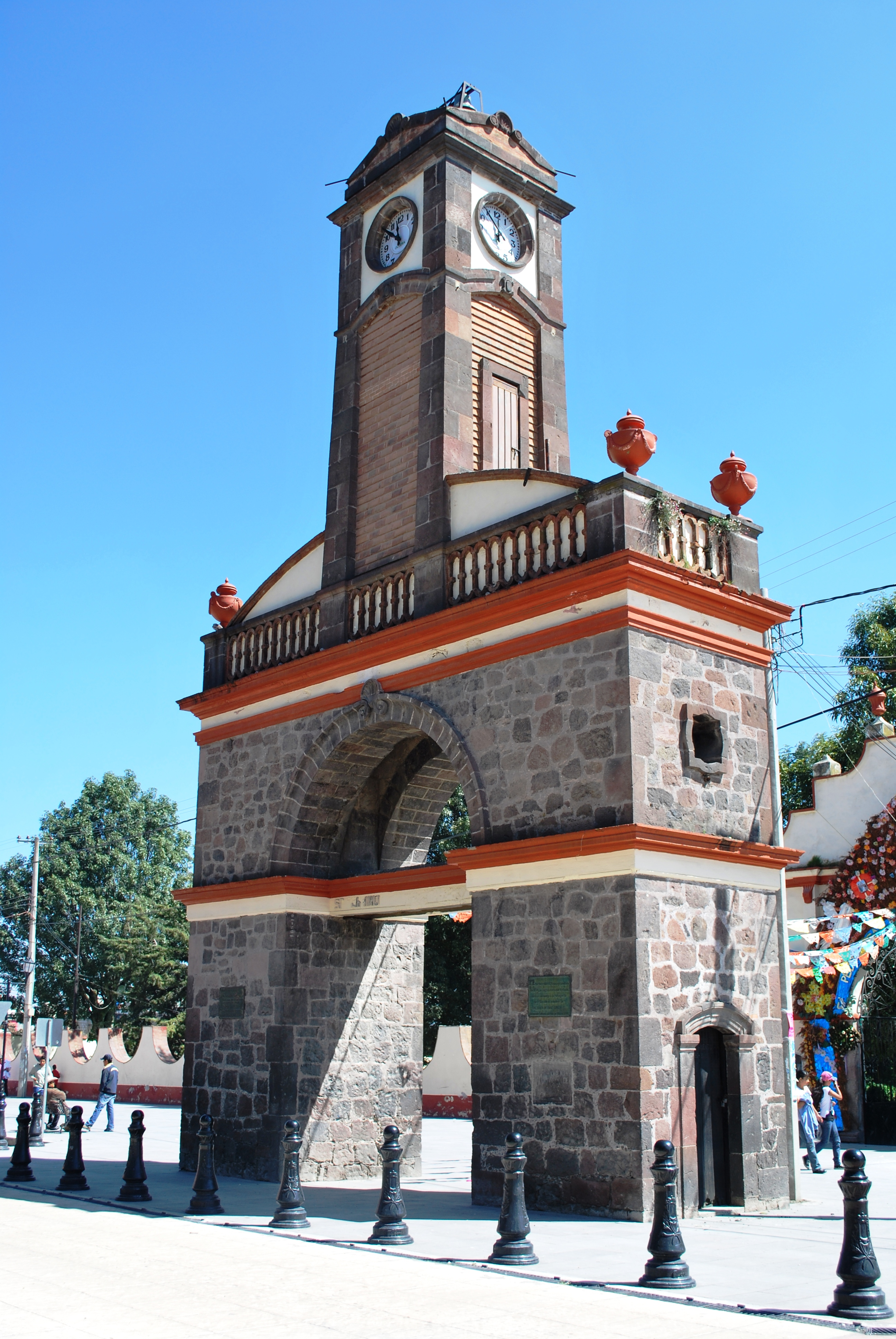
Clock tower built for Mexico's Centennial in 1910

The name comes from Nahuatl and means “where houses are constructed.” The symbol of the entity is an Aztec glyph which contains two of the signs for house on a horizontal line. “de Díaz González” was added to the official name in 1894 in honor of Prisciliano María de Díaz González, a politician and judge of the time.

It is believed that the community of Calimaya was founded at the same time as Teotenango, in 800 CE. In the pre-Hispanic period, the area was dominated by the Matlatzincas, with groups of Otomis, Mazahuas and Mexicas. This affected the language, culture and economy of the area. The first known ethnicity in the area was the Matlazincas with the area under the control of Teotenango. The area was still dominated by the same ethnicity when the Aztecs under Axayacatl conquered it in 1472 with long established villages.

Gonzalo de Sandoval conquered the area in 1521 for the Spanish. The area initially became an encomienda of Hernán Cortés, who later handed it over to Juan Gutiérrez Altamirano. Gutiérrez would temporarily lose control of the property in 1530 but Cortés intervened and the family would control it for generations, becoming the Counts of Santiago Calimaya.

The Franciscans were in charge of evangelization, establishing themselves in 1524.

Calimaya was one of three main sub-dominions in the area along with Tepemaxalco and Mexicaltzingo, which probably remained after the Conquest until 1549, when Spanish-style councils replaced indigenous authority. Calimaya's council formally began to function in 1560, with the area recognized as an “Indian Republic” (República de Indios). In 1560, the colonial government ordered the reorganization of the territories of Calimaya and Tepemaxalco. Much of this territory was not populated, so five new towns were founded: Mexicaltzingo, Chapultepec, San Antonio la Isla, Santa María Nativitas and San Andrés Ocotlán, each of these being subordinate to either Calimaya. The same year, Calimaya received authorization to hold a weekly market on Thursdays.

By the end of the 16th century, the indigenous population of the area dropped by 70%.

Agriculture remained the main economic activity through the colonial period, either on solid land or on artificial islands on area's lake and swamp called chinampas. In the 17th century, the area was divided into various haciendas, but all were under the control of the Count of Santiago Calimaya. By the beginning of the 18th century, some were independent of this family such as the Zacango Hacienda, belonging to a family named Martínez, the Rojas family ranch and others belonging to the Bartolomé, Gómez and López families.

The grandson of Juan Gutiérrez Altamirano married the granddaughter of the viceroy in 1616, which gained him a noble title, becoming the Count of Santiago Calimaya. This family was one of the most important during the colonial era. Their Mexico City residence is now the Museum of the City of Mexico. This title passed from the Altamirano family to the Cervantes family due to the lack of heirs in 1809. The last of this family to have the title was José Juan de Cervantes, as the rights to the property ended with Independence. However, Cervantes managed to maintain control over most of the land until his death 1874. His descendants divided the lands.

By 1718, the town of Calimaya would be a base for Spanish and Criollo merchants, which had an effect on the social order, forming schools and religious brotherhoods for festivals which are still celebrated.

During the Mexican War of Independence, the town of Calimaya was negatively affected by the uprising as well as an epidemic in 1813. The Count was one of the signers of the Act of Independence of the country.

From the beginning of the colonial era, Calimaya has been a seat of government under different arrangements. It became a municipality upon the creation of the State of Mexico just aft the conclusion of the War of Independence. The municipality was erected with the formation of the State of Mexico in 1824.

The economy remained tied to agriculture during most of the 19th century, but during the Porfirio Díaz period, the economy of the area grew and changed, especially in the town, where commerce became increasingly important. When Toluca became the capital of the State of Mexico, its growth created demand for agricultural products, also helping Calimaya's economy. It was also an important last stop before the capital for caravans arriving from the south. A number of the town's major works are from the late 19th to early 20th century due to this. The seat was officially declared a town in 1894. In 1897, a rail line was opening connecting Toluca, Metepec, Mexicaltzingo, Calimaya and Tenango. Around the same time, electric, telephone and telegraph service arrived.

The economic inequality in Mexico was evident in Calimaya as well by 1910, exacerbated by a fierce snowstorm in 1909 which ruined local crops. However, no fighting related to the Mexican Revolution occurred here. The 1910s and 1920s brought an end to the area's prosperity. However, the 1920s and 1930s would also bring technology such as more modern highways such as the one connecting Toluca and the south, which replaced the rail line. Socioeconomic reforms brought much agricultural land under the control of ejidos.

During the colonial period, the seat controlled a territory of 520.5 km2. The current municipality is 103.11km2.

== Geography ==
The land in the municipality is mostly flat, with the west side. The highest elevation is 4,578 meters above sea level, which is located on the slopes of the Nevada de Toluca. The lowest elevation is 2,600. In addition to the Nevado, another elevation is the Tepemaxalco Mountain, popularly known as the Cerro de los Cuates or Cerro de Putla. There are various streams in the area including the Las Cruces, Los Temascales, Las Palmas and El Ojo de Agua. Others run only during the rainy season.

=== Climate ===
The climate is classified as temperate and wet (Cwbg) with most rain falling in the summer. The driest months are from November to March. Average annual rainfall is between 800 and 900mm. Average annual temperature is between 12 and 14C. The highest temperatures average under 22C and usually occur in June. Freezing temperatures are possible from November to January and sometimes as early as September and as late as May. The possibility of early and late freezes can affect agriculture.

=== Flora and fauna ===
Ninety three percent of the municipality's surface is used for agriculture, livestock and forestry, with the rest used for residences and mining. The only wild areas are forests of oyamel fir, holm oak and pine on the slopes of the Nevada. The slopes of the volcano still contain fresh water springs, many of which run during the rainy season and when the snow melts off the volcano. Most of the municipality is deforested and the process continues due to lack of vigilance. Most wildlife has been exterminated except in the forested areas where some wildcats, deer and eagles can be found.

== Culture ==
Religion is mostly Catholicism with some syncretism from indigenous influences. Customs related to the agricultural cycle have not completely disappeared from the municipality. Seeds are still blessed before planting. Another old tradition is the “Paseo de los locos” (Procession of the crazy men), who are men dressed as women. Today, it is done for fun, but it has its origins in a fertility ritual tied to agriculture, with the aim of bringing rain. The most important religious celebration for the municipality is the feast day of Saints Peter and Paul on 29 July. Each year the event is sponsored by three volunteers called “mayordomos” with fireworks, bullfights and live bands. Next in importance are the processions related to Holy Week. This tradition dates back to the early colonial era and show the influence of the Spanish from Seville which dominated the town then.

The Santa María Nativitas Church is an example of folk Baroque style with the decoration molded from plaster. Another of this type is the chapel at San Andrés Ocotlán, whose main portal contains Salomonic columns, possibly added at the beginning of the 18th century. Others include the San Juan Bautista, San Bartolito and Nuestra Señora de los Ángeles chapels as well as the Nuestra Señora de la Concepción Church in Coatipac. This last contains an important main altar.

Mariachi music has been popular only since the 1970s, but has become an important part of traditional religious festivals. The first mariachi band in the municipality was the Mariachi San Juan, which is now known as the Mariachi de los Angeles. Today, there are about twenty or so in the municipality which mostly play weddings and other local events. The municipality hosts an annual Feria de Mariachi, which attracted about sixty bands in 2011 from as far as Jalisco and Aguascalientes.

The municipality used to be known for the weaving of a shawl called a rebozo. However, this tradition has all but died out.

Typical dishes here are the same as the region (barbacoa, tamales, etc.), with one local drink called tecui. The name is from Nahuatl and means “to move the heart.” It has its origins in the 19th century when mules brought sugar cane alcohol from Morelos, which was then mixed with sweetened orange juice. This is then lit just before serving.
