= San Mateo Mexicaltzingo =

- Town & Municipality
- Location within Mexico
- Coordinates: 19°12′33″N 99°35′09″W
- Country: Mexico
- State: State of Mexico
- Municipality: Mexicaltzingo
- Town founded: 1475
- Municipality founded: 1869

Government
  - Municipal President: Emigdio Villanueva Navor (2013-2015)
- Elevation (of seat): 2,600 m (8,500 ft)

Population (2005) Municipality
  - Municipality: 10,161
  - Seat: 8,611
- Time zone: UTC-6 (Central)
- Postal code (of seat): 52180
- Website: www.mexicaltzingo.gob.mx (in Spanish)

San Mateo Mexicaltzingo is a town and the municipal seat of the municipality of Mexicaltzingo located in the State of Mexico, in Mexico. It is located near Toluca. Mexicaltzingo means from the Náhuatl “Place in where the honorable mexica inhabit”.

== The town ==
The town of San Mateo Mexicaltzingo was founded in 1475 when Axayácatl ordered a number of families be moved to the area south of what is now Toluca. This town was founded more specifically by families from a village near Ixtapalapa. The village was almost completely destroyed by the Spanish, who destroyed their place of worship and made the people abandon their lands. They then renamed the village San Mateo Mexicaltzingo ('Xan Mateuhtzin' is the Náhuatl rendition of San Mateo, and the village was known by that name as well.) around 1527. Some natives people did return to form a semi-independent village governed by a tlatoani or chief by 1560. The first temple dedicated to Saint Matthew the Apostle was constructed in 1603, with later church constructed in 1776. The area had varying autonomous control and by 1743 the town was becoming recognized as the governing authority for the area although the municipality would not be official until the following century. In 1843 a permanent vicar would be installed here by the archbishop of Mexico. The municipality was established in 1869 but the municipal palace would not be built here until 1921.

As of the INEGI 2005 census, the town of San Mateo Mexicaltzingo had a population of 8,611 people.

The economic base of the town is fairly dependent on the agricultural production of the outlying municipality. The town is well known as a producer of chicharron and serves as a distributor of food products to nearby municipalities, Toluca and even to Mexico City. There is also a small motel here as well as a metal parts factory and two factories that produce construction supplies. The retail stores here cater mostly to the needs of locals.

Nearby are unexplored arqueological zones called de la Loma, Las Palmas, Tecacaxtitla and Bohuantilta. The town itself has a Casa de Cultura (House of Culture) that houses a small museum of the Ferrocarril Toluca a Tenango del Valle (Railway from Toluca to Tenango del Valle.

== The municipality ==
As municipal seat, San Mateo Mexicaltzingo has governing jurisdiction over the following communities: Colonia Mazachulco, Colonia San Isidro, El Calvario, and Las Palmas. The municipality is 12.20 square km and borders the municipalities of Metepec, Calimaya and Chapultepec. The total municipal population as of 2005 was 10,161 people.

The beginnings of the municipality go back to 1603, when the Viceroy Marqués de Montes Claros administratively grouped San Mateo Mexicaltzingo with the villages of Santa María Concepción, San Bartolomé, San Miguel Chapultepec and San Andrés Ocotlán into a zone called San Antonio Otompa. This district was a dependent of Calimaya but in 1700 it separated from this entity. The official petition to become a municipality was made by San Mateo Mexicaltzingo and its current subject communities in 1849, but such was not approved until 1869.

Agriculture is the main economic activity here growing corn, animal fodder, barley, carrots, peas and other beans, plums, peaches, and apples. Livestock raising includes dairy cows and, to a lesser degree, pigs, sheep and horses. Most milk is produced for autoconsumption. Domestic fowl include chicken for meat and eggs, and there is some production of honey.

According to the INEGI census of 2000 the current population of Mexicaltzingo is of 9225 inhabitants. The municipality covers an area of 12.2 km^{2} and it is located between the parallels 19° 11' 43 and 19° 13' 15 of north latitude, and the meridians 99° 33' 05 and 99° 37' 02 of west longitude.
