= Chapultepec, State of Mexico =

Chapultepec
- Municipality and town
- Coat of arms

- Location in Mexico
- Coordinates: 19°13′N 98°51′W
- Country: Mexico
- State: Mexico

Government
  - Mayor: Paulina Alejandra Del Moral

Area
  - Total: 10.45 km^{2} (4.03 sq mi)

Population (2020)
  - Total: 12,772
- Time zone: UTC-6 (Central Standard Time)

Chapultepec is a small town and municipality in the State of Mexico in Mexico. The municipality covers an area of 10.45 km^{2}.

== Etymology ==
The name Chapultepec comes from Náhuatl meaning hill of the Grasshoppers.

== Geography ==
The municipality of Chapultepec, which has a geographical extent of 9.676 km2 (6012.388 sq mi). The municipality is bordered by the municipalities of Toluca, Metepec, Mexicaltzingo, Calimaya and Tianguistenco.

In 2010, the municipality had a total population of 12,120.
