= Tonanitla =

- Municipality
- Coat of arms
- Interactive map of Tonanitla
- Coordinates: 19°41′17″N 99°03′14″W
- Country: Mexico
- State: Mexico (state)
- Municipal Seat: Santa María Tonanitla
- Created: July 25, 2003

Population (2020)
  - Total: 14,883
- Time zone: UTC-6 (Central Standard Time)

Tonanitla is one of 125 municipalities in Mexico State in Mexico. It is municipal seat is the town of Santa Maria Tonanitla. It is a new municipality created in 2003.

== Politics ==
Mayor	Time
Miguel Martínez Ortíz	2016–
