= San Mateo Atenco =

- Municipality
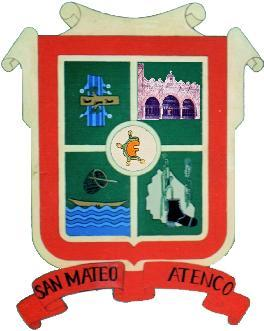
- Coat of arms
- Motto(s): Somos Brazo que Lucha y Espíritu que Crea (We are the fighting arm and the creating spirit)
- Location within Mexico
- Coordinates: 19°16′13″N 99°32′00″W
- Country: Mexico
- State: State of Mexico
- Municipal seat: San Mateo Atenco
- Founded: October 13, 1871

Government
  - Municipal President: C. Sergio Fuentes Vázquez (2009-2012)

Area
  - Total: 12.58 km^{2} (4.86 sq mi)
- Elevation: 2,600 m (8,500 ft)

Population (2005)Municipality
  - Total: 66,740
  - Seat: 63,356
- Time zone: UTC-6 (Central)
- Postal code: 52100
- Website: http://www.sanmateoatenco.gob.mx

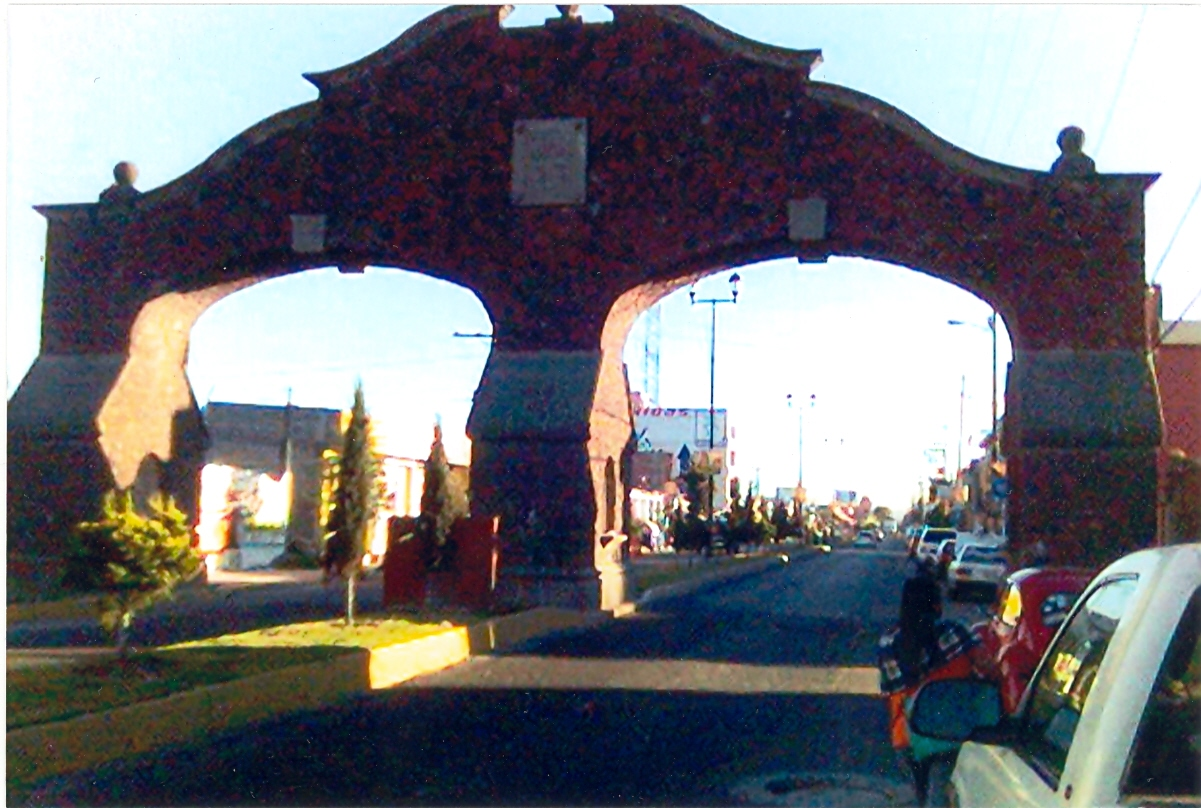
San Mateo Atenco entrance

San Mateo Atenco is one of 125 municipalities in the State of México in Mexico. The municipal seat is the town of San Mateo Atenco. It lies west of the Federal District (Distrito Federal) near the municipality of Metepec, in the central part of the state of México, and is part of the Toluca urban area bordering the city to the east. The name Atenco is derived from the Nahuatl language. It means “In the water’s edge”, from atl (water), tentli (edge) and co (in).

== The city ==
Enormous mammoth fossils have been found near the Lerma River, where San Mateo Atenco is today. The first settlers used mammoth fossils as tools for hunting. This area has been the scene of the development of cultural groups that transited through the Toluca Valley for 20 thousand years. During the pre-Classic period (2000 B.C.), agricultural development created small settlements. During the Classic period (250–900 A.C.), the settlements had cultural relations with Teotihuacán. Atenco was founded by the Matlazincas (Men of the net). Matlazincas were a militarist society and dominated the Toluca Valley during the period from 750 to 1162. The pre-Hispanic town was founded by Xolotl, the lord of Texcoco in the 12th century.

After the Spanish Conquest, Atenco was governed by Juan Altamirano who was the governor of the Marquise of Toluca. Since, the beginning of evangelization, Atenco was attended by Franciscans who gave it the name of San Mateo. San Mateo Atenco was part of the municipality of Metepec until 1726 when it became part of the district of Lerma.

During the Mexican War of Independence, Battle of Monte de las Cruces occurred near here in 1810. The insurgent army tried to cross the Lerma River by the Atenco Bridge. The Royal Army tried to stop the insurgents by destroying the bridge but this was not enough and the insurgents crossed the river. In the morning of October 30, the battle was fought, ending with the victory of the insurgent army.

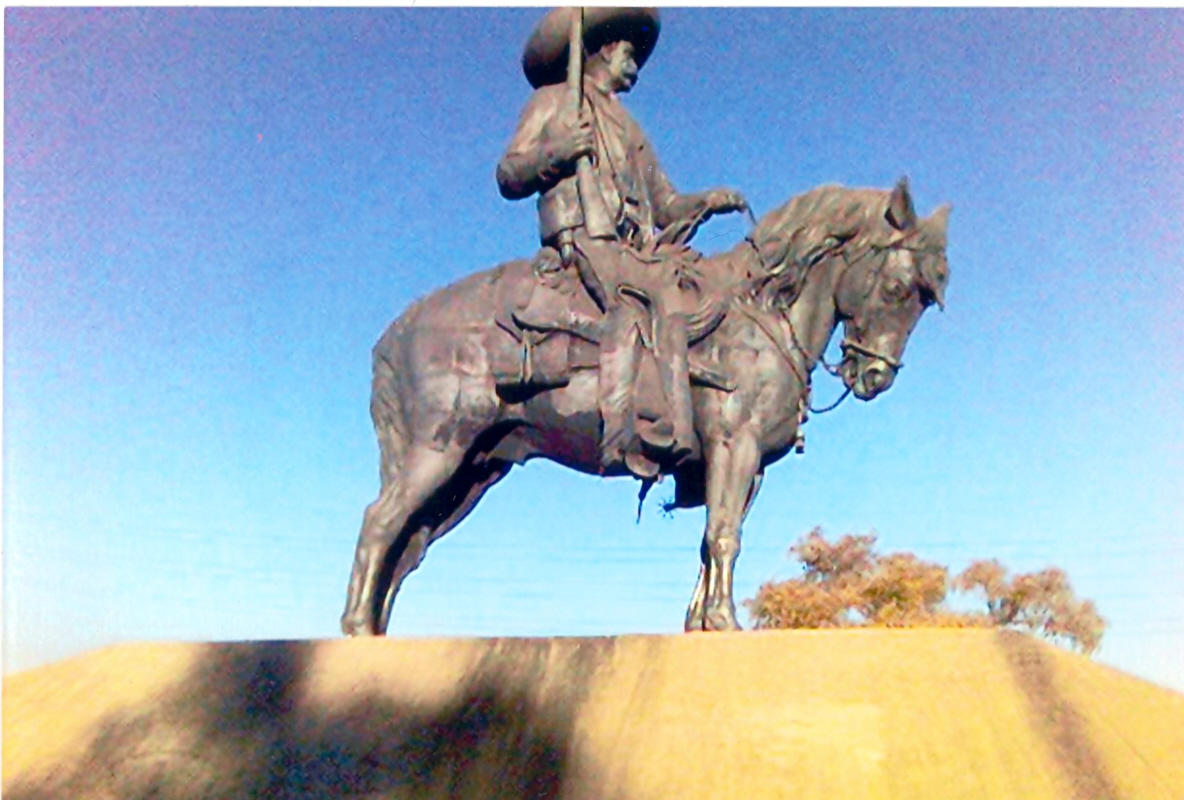
Monument of the General Emiliano Zapata

The population of the city in 2005 was 63,356, which is about 95% of the municipal population of 66,740, making the city nearly co-extensive with the municipality.

The most important sculpture is the equestrian monument of the General Emiliano Zapata. The most important architectonic work is the Chapel of San Pedro built in the sixteenth century.

The gastronomy is based on corn, bean, fava bean, chili peppers and vegetables like potatoes, quelites, turnips, and chivatos. In addition food stuffs are extracted from the lagoon, like quintonil, watercress, water chestnuts, and chichamol.

While the city is home to a number of large industries, it is best known for the making of shoes and other leather products, many of which are sold in a famous market.

== The municipality ==
As the city is nearly co-extensive with the municipality, the city of San Mateo Atenco has governing jurisdiction over only three other communities: Santa María la Asunción, Barrio de San Francisco (San Agustín), and Barrio de San Pedro.

As governor of the State of Mexico, Mariano Riva Palacio, separated the municipality of San Mateo Atenco, from the district of Lerma, on October 12, 1871. San Mateo Atenco has an extension of 18.8 km^{2}. The population of the municipality was 66,740 as of 2005, with 51.08 percent women and 49.92 percent men. The total population is 66740.

San Mateo belongs to the sixth judicial district of the State of Mexico. This consists of San Mateo Atenco and the neighborhoods of San Juan, San Miguel, San Nicolas and Santiago; and by the counties of San Pedro Atenco, La Concepcion, La Magdalena, Guadalupe, Santa Maria, San Francisco, San Lucas and San Isidro; and by the residential areas of Emiliano Zapata, Isidro Fabela, Alvaro Obregon, Reforma (San Antonio), Buenavista and Francisco I. Madero. The municipality of San Mateo Atenco is under control of the city council, with a municipal president, a comptroller, a judge, five deputies and three delegates.

=== Natural features ===
San Mateo Atenco is part of the Toluca Valley at a height of 2600 meters, in a flat area with no major features within its borders. The Lerma River flows between urban zone and what little remains of the rural zone.

The weather in San Mateo Atenco has a temperate, semi-arid climate. The warmest weather is experienced before the rain season begins in the early summer. Its temperatures vary between 10 and 12 °C.

The flora mainly consists of trees like willow, pine and cedar. There are also bushes and aquatic plants. The fauna consists of hares, skunks, ferrets, cacomixtles and tlacuaches; birds like sparrows, swallows, matracas, tordos, turtledoves and owls; and reptiles like snakes, lizards, vipers and chameleons.

=== Health system ===
The more frequent diseases in the San Mateo Atenco’s population are: malnutrition, viral hepatitis, parasitic infections, pneumonia, salmonella, alcoholism and some stomach diseases. To attend the medical issues, San Mateo Atenco’s community has the following institutions: Centro de Salud C: in San Miguel neighborhood, with one doctor, one deontologist and two nurses. Casa de Salud: located in Guadalupe’s neighborhood, with one doctor and one nurse.

=== Education and culture ===
The education in the municipality has the following services: 7 kindergartens, 12 elementary schools, 4 high schools, 1 physical education school, and Centro Tecnologico No. 24 (Technological Center No. 24).

In December 1981, the Museo Regional (Regional Museum) was founded.

80 percent of the population is Catholic, 15 percent is Evangelist and 5 percent is Spiritualist.

The most important celebration is the day of San Mateo (patron saint of the city), celebrated on September 21. The celebrations are mostly secular. Therefore, the community plays basketball, soccer, box, bicycling and athletics.

== Transportation ==
The highways located in San Mateo Atenco are:

San Mateo Atenco-Toluca to the northeast

San Mateo Atenco- Mexico D.F to the northwest

San Mateo Atenco- Metepec to the southeast

San Mateo Atenco- San Pedro Tultepec to the southwest

== Geography ==
=== Agriculture ===
The type of soil in the municipality is temporal and the regions near the Lerma River are slimy. The principal agricultural products are 80 percent corn, 10 percent fava bean, 5 percent bean, 3 percent vegetables and 2 percent oats. Cattle raising has fallen considerably because of the drying of the lagoon. The demographic explosion does not allow people to have stables. The principal products are: bovine, porcine, equine and birds.

=== Commerce ===
In San Mateo Atenco for more than 80 years the most important work source has been the production of footwear. Another important activity is fishing. The principal commercial organization is “Union de productores de zapatos de San Mateo”. The principal industry is the footwear industry. There are factories and workshops dedicated to the production of footwear.
