= San Antonio la Isla =

- Municipality
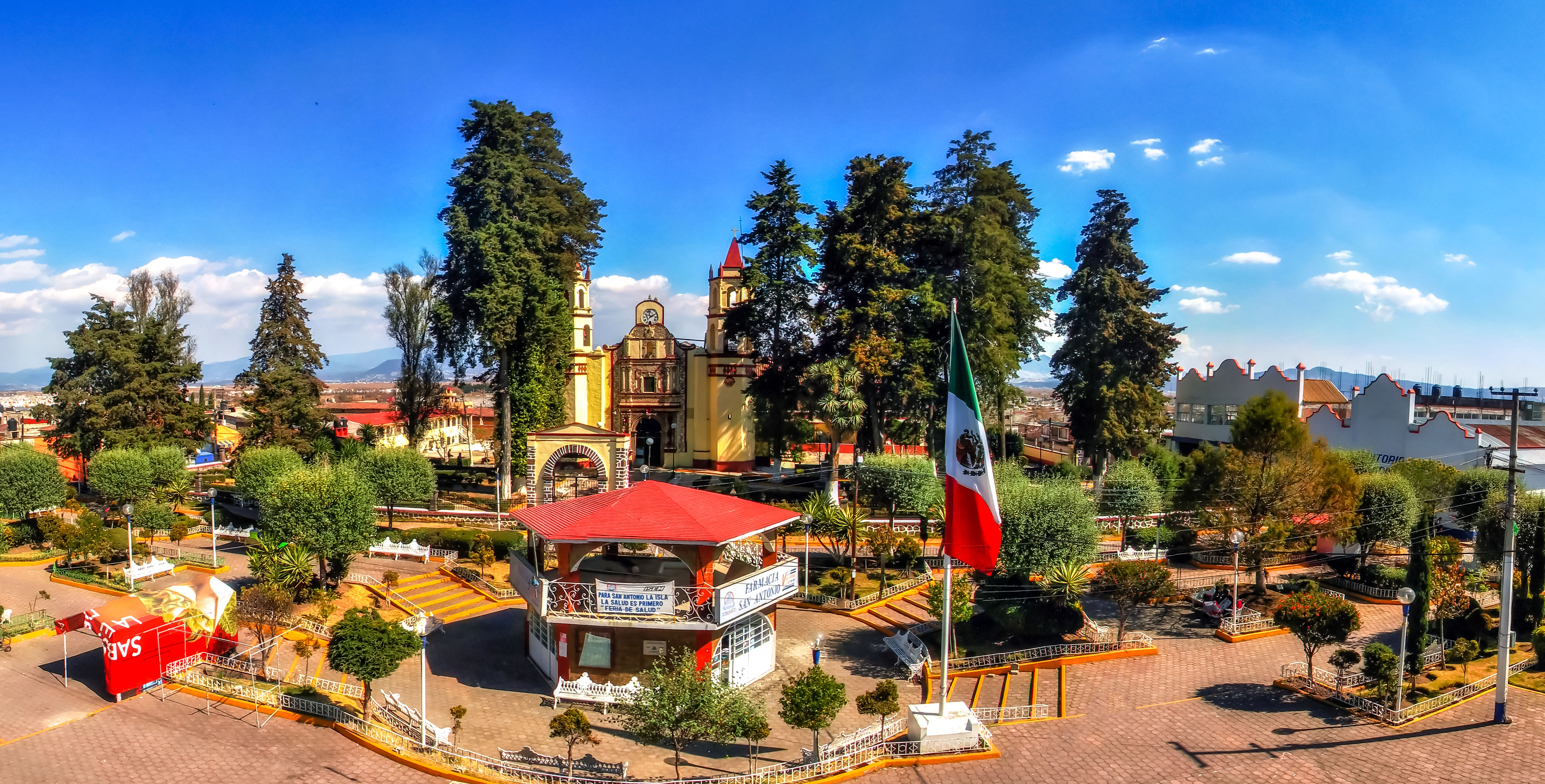

- Coat of arms
- Interactive map of San Antonio la Isla
- Coordinates: 19°42′26″N 99°47′12″W
- Country: Mexico
- State: State of Mexico
- Municipal Seat: San Antonio la Isla
- Town Founded: 1603
- Municipality Founded: 1847

Government
  - Municipal President: (2006–2009)

Population (2020)
  - Municipality: 31,962
  - Seat: 17,075
- Time zone: UTC-6 (Central)
- Postal code (of seat): 52280
- Website: (in Spanish)

San Antonio La Isla is a municipality located in the State of Mexico in Mexico. Its municipal seat is the town of San Antonio la Isla. Its name originally was "Techialoyan" or "Tlachialoyan," which in Nahuatl means "place of those who watch." Its glyph is an eye on the apex of a pyramid that floats on water. It is located in the Matlatzinca Valley, south of Toluca, the state capital.

== The town ==
The area was originally inhabited by the Matlatzinca, then by the Otomi before it was conquered by the Aztec Empire under Axayacatl. While there is oral tradition indicating the area once held the name of "place of Otomis," its first written mention in the Codex of Mendoza has the name "Techialoyan." The area was the purview of Calimaya and Tepemajalco, but in 1603 the town of San Antonio Techialoyan was officially recognized by authorities. In the 17th century it was considered to be a semi-independent "Indian republic," according to the Codex of San Antonio Techialoyan, which notes Miguel de Santa María Axayácatl as its governor. Spaniards are not mentioned as part of the population until after 1650.

During the Mexican War of Independence, insurgent leader Father Miguel Hidalgo passed through here on his way to Tianguistenco, recruiting men for his army.

== The municipality ==
For most of its history after the Conquest, San Antonio La Isla was a political and religious dependency of Calimaya. However, after petition, it was granted municipal status by degree in 1847.
