= Almoloya de Juárez =

- Town & Municipality
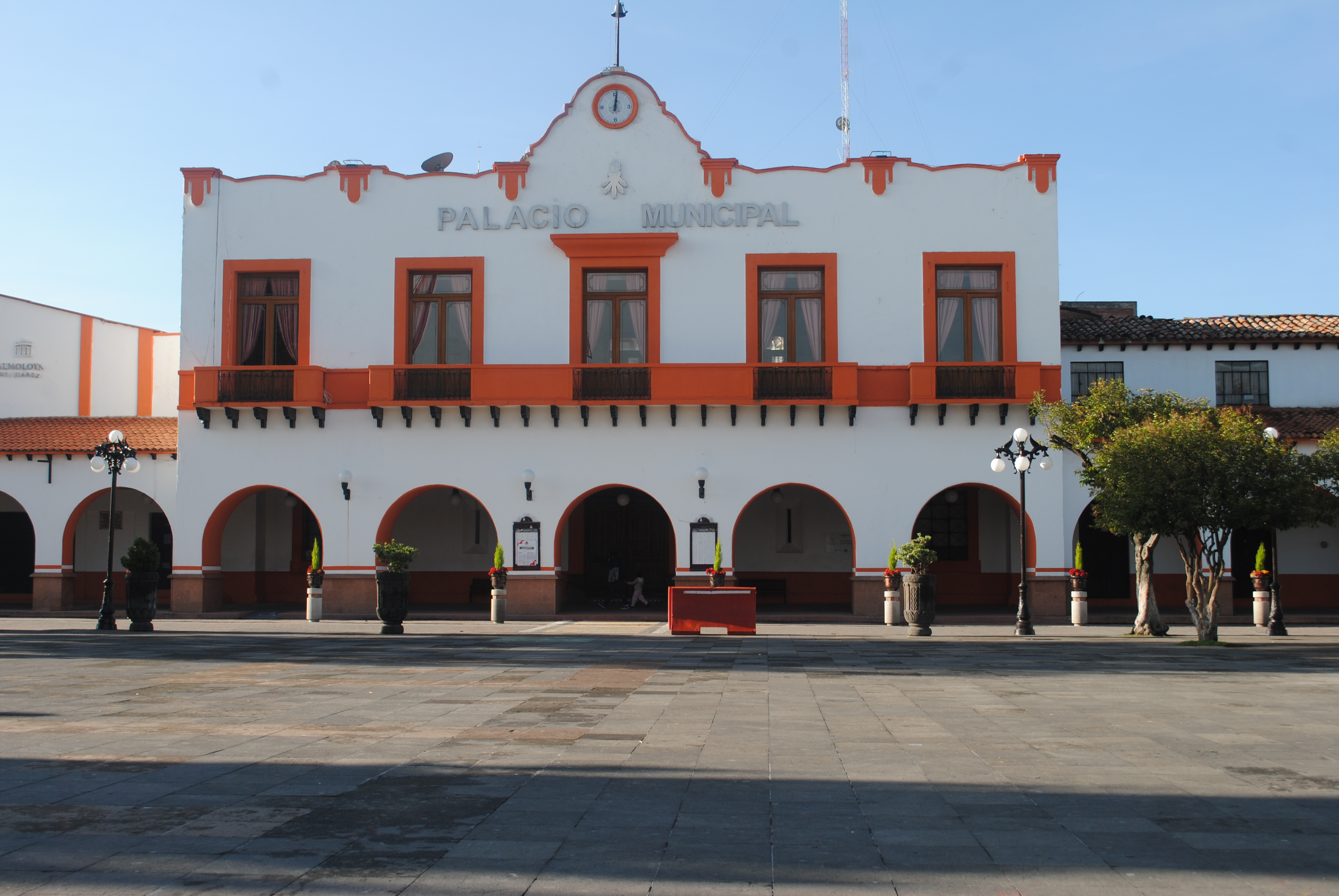

- Coat of arms

- Location within Mexico
- Coordinates: 19°22′12″N 99°45′37″W
- Country: Mexico
- State: State of Mexico
- Municipal Status: 1825

Government
  - Municipal President: Adolfo Jonathan Solís Gómez (2015–2018)
- Elevation (of seat): 2,600 m (8,500 ft)

Population (2005) Municipality
  - Municipality: 126,163
  - Seat: 3,202
- Time zone: UTC-6 (Central)
- Postal code (of seat): 50900

Almoloya de Juárez is a town in the State of Mexico and the seat of the municipality of Almoloya de Juárez. The name Almoloya comes from the Nahuatl, that is properly Almoloyan, composed of: atl, "water"; molo "impersonal voice of moloni, to flow the source" and yan, "place"; that it means "place where flows the water source".

== The town ==
The town serves as the business supply center for the regional agricultural and livestock operations. The Penal del Altiplano maximum security federal prison is located approximately 6 km north of the town; it is so notorious, that the entire town of "Almoloya" is associated with the prison, and "being sent to Almoloya" is synonymous for being sent there.

== The municipality ==
As municipal seat, Almoloya de Juárez has governing jurisdiction over the following communities:

Arroyo Zarco Centro (Dilatada Centro), Arroyo Zarco la Mesa, Barrio del Carmen, Barrio del Jacal de Yebuciví, Barrio el Ocote, Barrio la Cabecera Primera Sección, Barrio la Cabecera Tercera Sección, Barrio la Galera (La Galera), Barrio San Pedro (La Concepción San Pedro), Barrio Santa Juana, Benito Juárez, Besana Ancha, Buenavista Yebuciví, Cañada de Guadarrama, Casa Nueva (Casa Nueva Yebuciví), Cerro San Mateo, Cieneguillas de Guadalupe, Cieneguillas de Mañones, Colonia Bellavista, Colonia la Navidad, Colonia Lázaro Cárdenas (La Trampa), Conjunto Habitacional Ecológico SUTEYM, Dilatada Sur (Dilatada), Ejido de San Lorenzo Cuauhtenco, Ejido de San Pedro, Ejido de Santa Juana Primera Sección, Ejido del Estanco, Ejido la Gavia (San José la Gavia), Ejido San Antonio Ocoyotepec, Ejido San Diego, Ejido Tres Barrancas, El Estanco, El Plan, El Plan de San Pedro, El Santito (Barrio el Santito Yebuciví), El Tepetatal, El Tulillo, Ex-hacienda Boreje, Ex-hacienda la Gavia, Fraccionamiento Colinas del Sol, La Cabecera, La Hortaliza, La Lagunita Ejido del Jacal Yebuciví, La Palma (Ej. de San Fco.Tlalcilalcalpan), La Posta, La Soledad Ocoyotepec, La Tinaja, La Unión Ocoyotepec, Laguna de Tabernillas (El Resbaloso), Loma Blanca, Loma de Guadalupe, Loma de la Tinaja, Loma de San Miguel, Loma del Jacal (Loma de las Mangas), Loma del Puente, Loma del Rancho, Loma del Salitre (Colonia Loma del Salitre), Los Lagartos (Bo. los Lagartos de Yebuciví), Mayorazgo de León (Estación Río México), Mextepec (Ex-hacienda Mextepec), Mina México, Ocoyotepec (Ocoyotepec Centro), Palos Amarillos (Palos Amarillos Yebuciví), Paredón Centro, Paredón Ejido, Paredón Ejido Norte, Piedras Blancas (Piedras Blancas Centro), Piedras Blancas Sur, Poteje Norte, Poteje Sur, Ranchería de San Diego (Ciénega de San Diego), Rancho Atotonilco, Rancho la Soledad, Rancho los Gavilanes, Rancho San Diego Buenavista (Ej. San Diego), Rancho San José Amealco (Rancho el Capulín), Rancho San Nicolás, Río Frío (Río Frío Yebuciví), Rosa Morada, Salitre de Mañones, San Agustín Citlali, San Agustín las Tablas, San Agustín Poteje Centro, San Agustín Tabernillas, San Antonio Atotonilco, San Antonio Buenavista, San Cristóbal, San Francisco Tlalcilalcalpan, San Isidro (El Reservado), San Lorenzo Cuauhtenco, San Mateo Tlalchichilpan, San Miguel Almoloyán, San Nicolás Amealco, San Pedro de la Hortaliza (Ej. Almoloyán), Santa Catarina Tabernillas, Santa Juana Centro (La Palma), Santa Juana Primera Sección, Santa Juana Segunda Sección, Santa María Nativitas, Santiaguito, Santiaguito Tlalcilalcalli, Tierra y Libertad (Miguel Hidalgo), Unidad Habitacional Olaldea (Colonia Olaldea), Villa de Almoloya de Juárez, and Yebuciví Centro (Yebuciví)

=== Coat of arms ===
The coat of arms of Almoloya de Juárez is taken as municipal shield and its description is: in the top part the silhouette of Benito Juárez, whose last name complements the name of the municipality; in the center, it contains a coffee-colored space, which represents its territory; the bottom part represents a blue water obstacle, which gives its origin to the name, whose meaning is "place where the water source flows" and each end finishes off in shells and snails.

=== Location ===
The municipality is located in the region I Toluca, belongs to the XIV judicial and rentístico district with its seat in the State Capital, to which the municipalities of Toluca, Metepec, Temoaya, Villa Victoria and Zinacantepec correspond.

It is a city as is its surrounding municipality in Zone I of the Mexican state of México. The municipality is located just to the north-west of state capital Toluca and had a population of 126,483 in the 2005 census.

=== Economy ===
Principal sectors, products and services include agriculture, ranching and industry.

Agriculture

The importance of farming activity is reflected in that more than 60% of its surface is destined to the production of maize principally. Other products that are important for the farming in Almoloya de Juárez are potatoes, beans and forages for the animals.

Ranching

There are considered to be zones of biggest cattle activity the localities of: San Miguel, Mextepec, Cieneguillas and San Cristobal. In Almoloya de Juárez, people who dedicate to ranching hand principally sheep, goats, pigs and poultry.

Industry

The industrial activity inside Almoloya de Juarez municipality is located in the highway Toluca-Zitácuaro in the Zone of the Yukon. In this place are located two companies of a considerable size: the Wastebasket the Snow-capped mountain and Gorostidi. On the other hand, there exists a whole of 84 establishments between mini and small industry, of these, 65 concern to the subsector; it 36 are of mineral products not metal-workers of the branch and 3,611 devote themselves to the pottery and ceramics.

=== Economically active population for Sector ===
The comparative tables of the percentages of the economically active population for economic sector show clearly the variation that to existed of the year of 1980 and 1990.

	Economic sectors (1980)			Economic sectors (1990)		
	I	II	III	I	II	III
Population	12,466	32,615	4,542	7,553	7,997	4,750
Percent	61.50	16.08	22.42	35.00	39.39	25.61

== See also ==
- Federal Social Readaptation Center No. 1
