= Otzolotepec =

Coordinates: 18°34′N 97°15′W

- Municipality
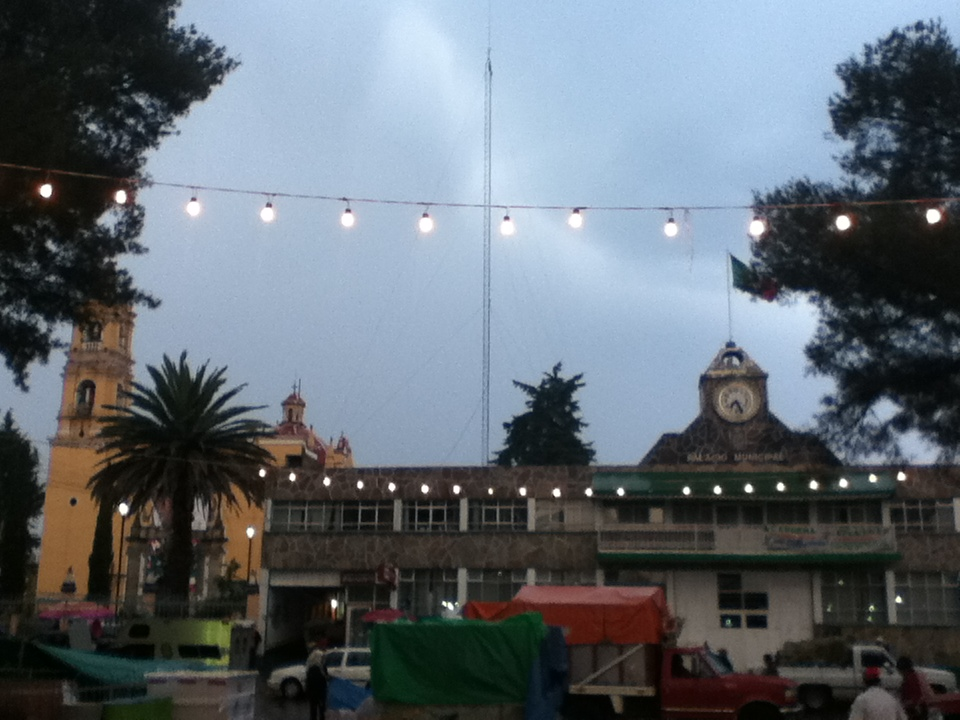
- Villa Cuauhtemóc

- Coat of arms
- Interactive map of Otzolotepec
- Country: Mexico
- State: Mexico (state)
- Municipal seat: Villa Cuauhtémoc

Area
  - Total: 127.95 km^{2} (49.40 sq mi)

Population (2005)
  - Total: 67,611
- Time zone: UTC-6 (Central Standard Time)

Otzolotepec is a municipality in Mexico State in Mexico. The municipality covers an area of 127.95 km^{2}.

As of 2005, the municipality had a total population of 67,611.
