= Tenango del Valle =

Coordinates: 19°08′29″N 99°45′00″W

- Municipality
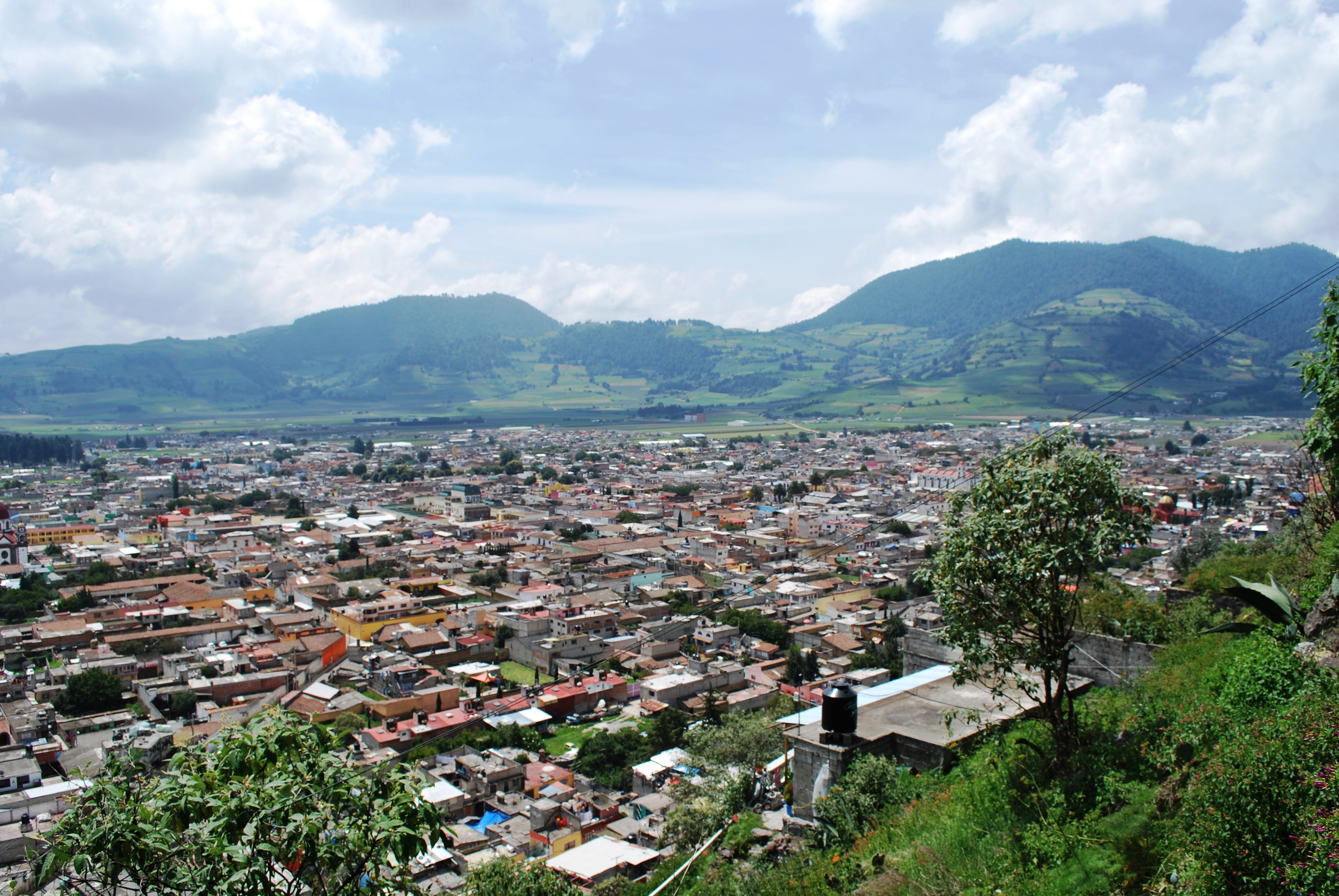

- Coat of arms
- Interactive map of Tenango del Valle
- Country: Mexico
- State: State of Mexico
- Municipal Seat: Tenango de Arista
- City Founded: 1550
- Municipality Founded: 1847

Government
  - Municipal President: Gabriel Gallegos García (2006-2009)
- Elevation (of seat): 2,600 m (8,500 ft)

Population (2010) Municipality
  - Municipality: 77,965
  - Seat: 20,238
- Time zone: UTC-6 (Central)
- Postal code (of seat): 52300

The municipality of Tenango del Valle is located in the southern portion of the Valley of Toluca in Mexico State, about 72 km southwest of Mexico City and 25 km south of Toluca. The municipal seat is the city of Tenango de Arista. While the seat is officially named Tenango de Arista, it is more commonly referred to as Tenango del Valle, as this was the original name of the town. Tenango del Valle is best known as the site of the Teotenango archeological site, which was a walled city inhabited from about 900 C.E. to 1550 C.E.

== History of the town and municipality ==
The name "Tenango" shows the modern town's relationship with the nearby ruins of Teotenango. This site, when it was occupied, was called Tenango (or "place of the wall"). When the indigenous people were moved from this city to the valley floor below, the new village was also called Tenango. "Del Valle" (of the valley) was eventually added to distinguish the new village from the old city. Over time, the abandoned city of Tenango, became known as Teotenango ("walled city of the gods"). Both the archeological ruins and the Spanish village were referred to by the Aztec glyph for "Tenango" in the early colonial period in documents such as the Mendocino Codex. Today, this glyph is used to refer to the modern town and municipality.

At the time of the Spanish conquest the southern part of the Toluca Valley, including the Tenango area, was dominated ethnically by the Matlatzincas, whose center was the Teotenango site on Tetepetl Hill. However, this city had been conquered around 1474 by Axayacatl and was part of the Aztec Empire, so it was politically dominated by the Aztecs. Spanish takeover of the southern Toluca Valley was accomplished by Andres de Tapia, with support of Gonzalo de Sandoval from Toluca. However, due to the Teutenango Treaty of 1582, credit for the conquest is given to Martin Dorantes.

After subduing the Matlatzinca population, the conquistadors decided to move the population from the Teotenango site to the valley below, establishing the modern town of Tenango del Valle. Next came the establishment of encomiendas, or land grants which gave the Spaniards who received them control over the native population. Teotenango became the encomienda of Juan de Burgos and Diego Rodriguez. Atlatlahuaca and Xochiaca, other communities in the modern municipality of Tenango del Valle, were granted to Hernando de Jerez with Zictepec and Zepayautla becoming part of the encomienda of Tacuba.

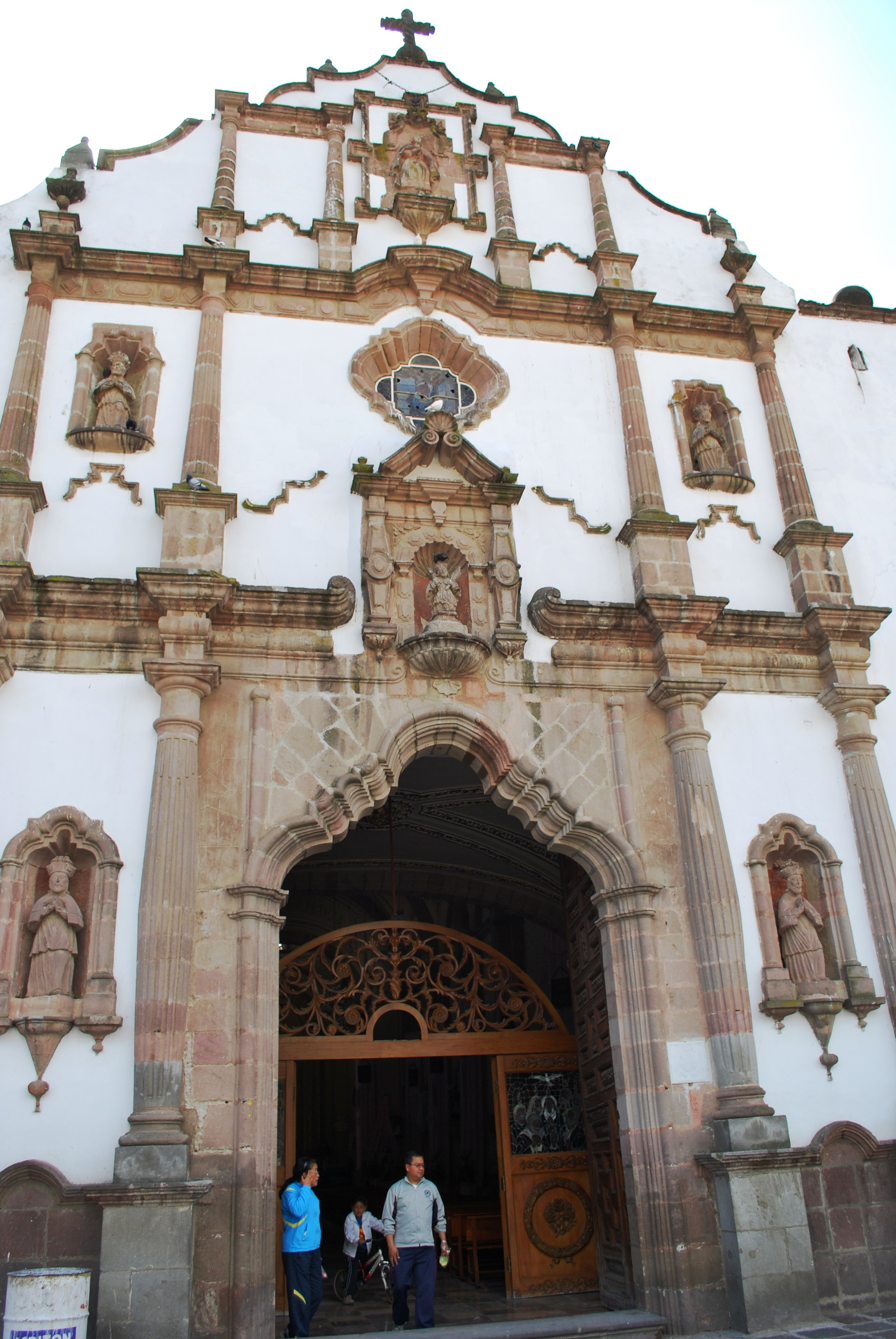
Facade of the Assumption of Mary Church

Encomiendas were not allowed to pass onto descendants, and for this reason, the Crown established "corregimientos" in the 1530s in most areas of what is now the municipality of Tenango del Valle. These corregimientos were designed to attend to judicial matters between encomienda (later hacienda) holders and the indigenous population. These corregimientos were headed by an "alcalde mayor" or "high mayor."

Initially, the Franciscans were in charge of evangelizing the area, but soon after this task fell to the regular clergy. During the Mexican War of Independence, insurgent forces under generals Joaquin Canseco, Jose Maria Oviedo, Felipe Nubi and Vicente Vargas fought against General Porlier of the royal Spanish Army in 1811. Later General Ignacio López Rayón used Tetepetl Hill as a strategic lookout. After the independence of Mexico and the creation of the State of Mexico in 1824, Tenango del Valle become one of the new state's first municipalities. The municipal seat gained the status of town in 1847. In 1861, the seat officially changed its name to Tenango de Arista to honor Mariano Arista, who was president of Mexico from 1851 to 1853. For its strategic role during the War of Independence, the state congress gave the seat the official name of Heroica Villa de Tenango de Arista in 1868. Most of the population of the municipality was quiet during the Mexican Revolution, due to maneuvering by those with money and power, with only the small town of Zictepec openly joining the Zapatista rebels. But the stranglehold on arable land caused most residents here to sympathize with the Zapatistas.

During the 20th century, the town grew with the introduction of schools, an industrial park to provide jobs, and better transport and communication infrastructure. By 1994, Tenango de Arista reached the status of city.

== The city ==
Tenango de Arista is better known as Tenango del Valle, is located in the south of the Valley of Toluca. It sits at about 2,600 meters above sea level, with a temperate climate, with some frost in winter and rains primarily in the summer. As of the 2005 INEGI census, the city had a population of 20,238 residents.

The main attraction of the town is the archeological zone of Teotenango, which is located on Tetepetl Hill, just north-northwest of the main plaza of the modern town. Inside the town itself, there are two large Art Nouveau style structures and two churches of interest. The first Art nouveau structure is the Municipal Theater located in the Municipal Palace just off the main square. The second is a large building covering nearly an entire block, which is now used at the Benito Juarez Garcia Primary School. Both were built during the "Porfirato," a period of time at the end of the 19th and beginning of the 20th centuries when this building style was very much in vogue in Mexico. The main and original church of the town is the Parish of the Assumption of Mary which dates from the 16th century. It is a typical example of a Baroque church of the provinces, something which is disappearing as these old churches age. The other church is called the Temple of El Calvario, which is of Neo-classic design. This temple is located where the main east-west street ends at the foot of the Tetepetl Hill. It has a rectangular name and forms a small Latin cross.

The main square of the town contains a kiosk, and is surrounded by portals and a municipal market which is very typical for this area. Market days, when the town's streets fill with street vendors from the rest of the municipality, are Thursdays and Sundays. Tenango de Arista gained city status in 1994, but still retains much of its rural character.

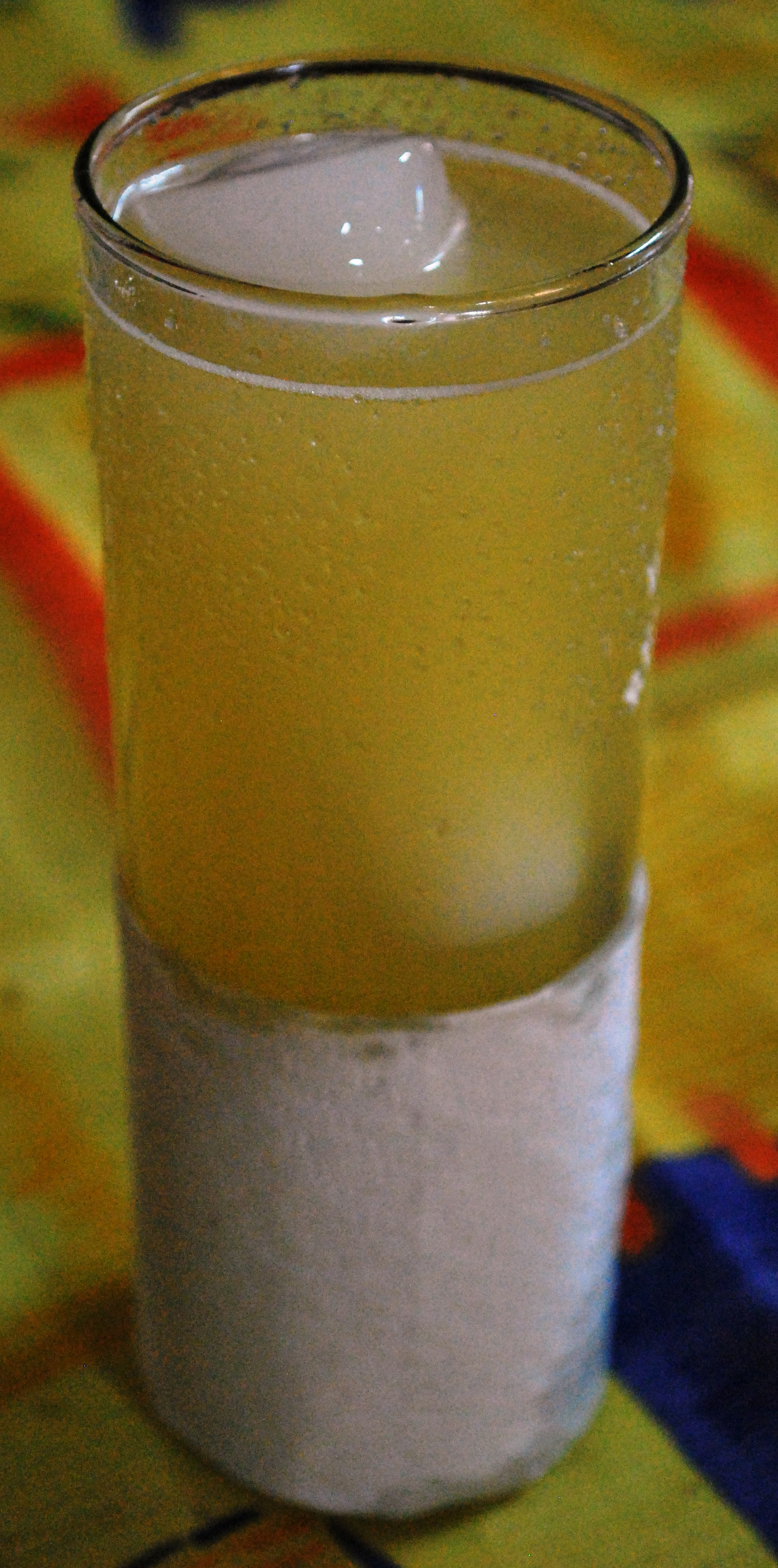
A "piñita"

Tenango is noted for its traditional cuisine such as barbacoa, meat consumé, cecina, and rabbit dishes. The town is also the home of two alcoholic drinks called "piñitas" (a drink made primarily with pineapple juice and vodka) and "banderitas" (a type of apple liqueur). It is also known for leatherworking, especially belts, purses and wallets as well as saddle-making. Its most representative festival is in honor of "Padre Jesús" (lit. Father Jesus) in mid-January. This festival includes dances such as "Moros y cristianos" and "Concheros." In addition, the spring equinox is celebrated here in the main plaza.

== Teotenango ==
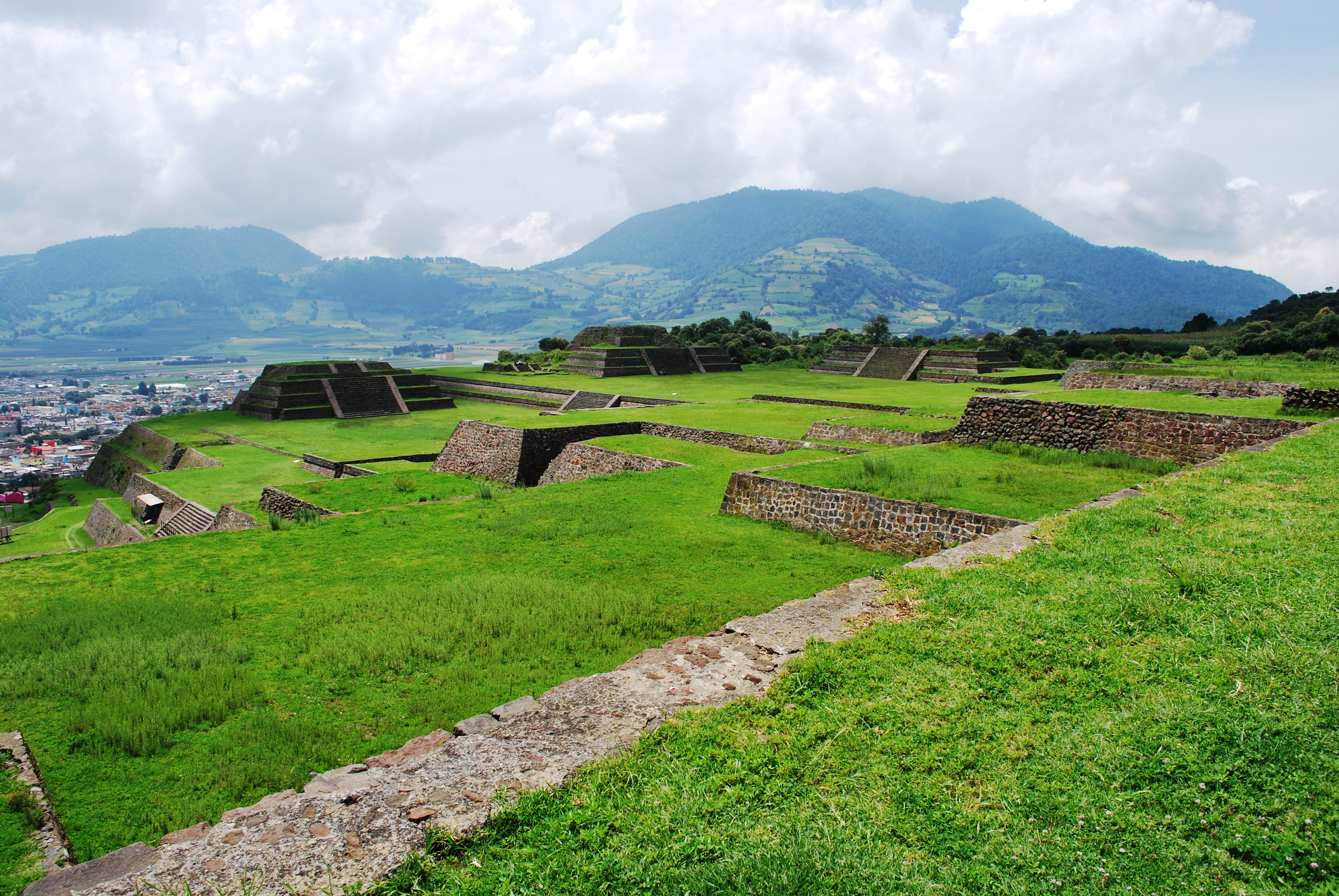
View of part of the Teotenango site

This archeological site was the town which was abandoned in favor of the new settlement on the valley floor after the Spanish Conquest of the Aztec Empire. It is located on Tetepetl Hill, just north and west of the modern town's main square. It was the largest fortified city in the Valley of Toluca in pre-Hispanic times. It was excavated in the 1970s by the Instituto Mexiquense de Cultura, who continues to maintain the site as well as the Roman Piña Chan Archeological Museum located at the base of Tetepetl Hill. This site is one of the major tourist draws for the State of Mexico after Teotihuacan, Valle de Bravo and Chalma. The obelisk that marks the entrance to the reconstructed site was built in the 1930s and is in honor of Ignacio Lopez Rayon. It is built to emulate the style of the pyramid of Conjuto A. The archeological zone of Teotenagno receives about 4,000 visitors annually.

== The municipality ==
As municipal seat, the city of Tenango de Arista has governing jurisdiction over the following communities: San Bartolomé Atlatlahuca, Rancho Gómez Tagl, Rancho la Providencia, Santa Cruz, Pueblo Nuevo (Pueblo Nuevo), San Francisco Putla, San Francisco Tepexozuca, San Francisco Tetetla, Colonia San José, Loma San Joaquín, Rancho de José Herrera (La Deportiva), San Miguel Balderas, San Pedro Tlanixco, San Pedro Zictepec, Santa María Jajalpa, Santiaguito Cuaxustenco, Santa Cecilia, El Coloso (Las Cruces), La Cooperativa, Colonia Azteca, La Isleta (Islote), La Haciendita, La Herradura, Acatzingo, El Guarda, San Isidro, Colonia San Román (El Llano), La Hacienda de Cuautenango, Monte Calvario, San Juan Tepehuixco, Rancho el Cerrito (Los Charcos), El Zarzal, Cruz Blanca, Colonia de las Minas, Loma Rancho Juan Méndez, Los Cedros, Colonia San José (Barranca Mocha), La Loma (Las Ruinas), and Los Lavaderos. The total population of the municipality is 68,669 people, and it extends for 208.88 square kilometres (80.65 sq mi). It borders the municipalities of Calimaya, Santa María Rayón, Texcalyacac, Tenancingo, Villa Guerrero, and Toluca.

The geography of the municipality includes a number of elevations such at the Tetepetl, the Azul, the Ladera, the Tepehuisco, the Zacatonal and the Cuexcontepec. There are no rivers in this area but there are a number of fresh-water springs that feed streams such as Arroyo Grande, La Cieneguita, El Zaguan, Dos Caminos, La Cienega, Almoloya and Las Cruces. The climate is classified as temperate and mostly moist with most rains coming in the summer. Freezing temperatures are experienced in winter with strong winds often present in February and March. The average temperature is 13.5 °C (56.3 °F), varying between 29.5 °C (85.1 °F) in the summer and 5 °C (41 °F) in winter.

Natural resources in the area mostly consist of the municipalities forests, in which there are a number of species used for lumber. Animal wildlife has been nearly extinguished here due to human activity and mostly consists of rabbits, birds and some coyotes.

More than half of the land in the municipality (54%) is used for agriculture and about a third is used for forestry.

Agriculture remains the principal economic activity of the municipality, with more than half the land in the municipality (54%) dedicated to it. Corn is the primary crop. Second is livestock such as sheep, cattle and pigs accounting for 70% of the animals raised here. About one-third of the municipality land is used for the production of forest products such as wood. Supplementing this is the Parque Industrial Tenango, which contains industries such as Micron, a plastics producer and various food processing plants.
