= 23rd federal electoral district of the State of Mexico =

Federal electoral district of Mexico

State of Mexico's 23rd
- Electoral district of the Chamber of Deputies of Mexico

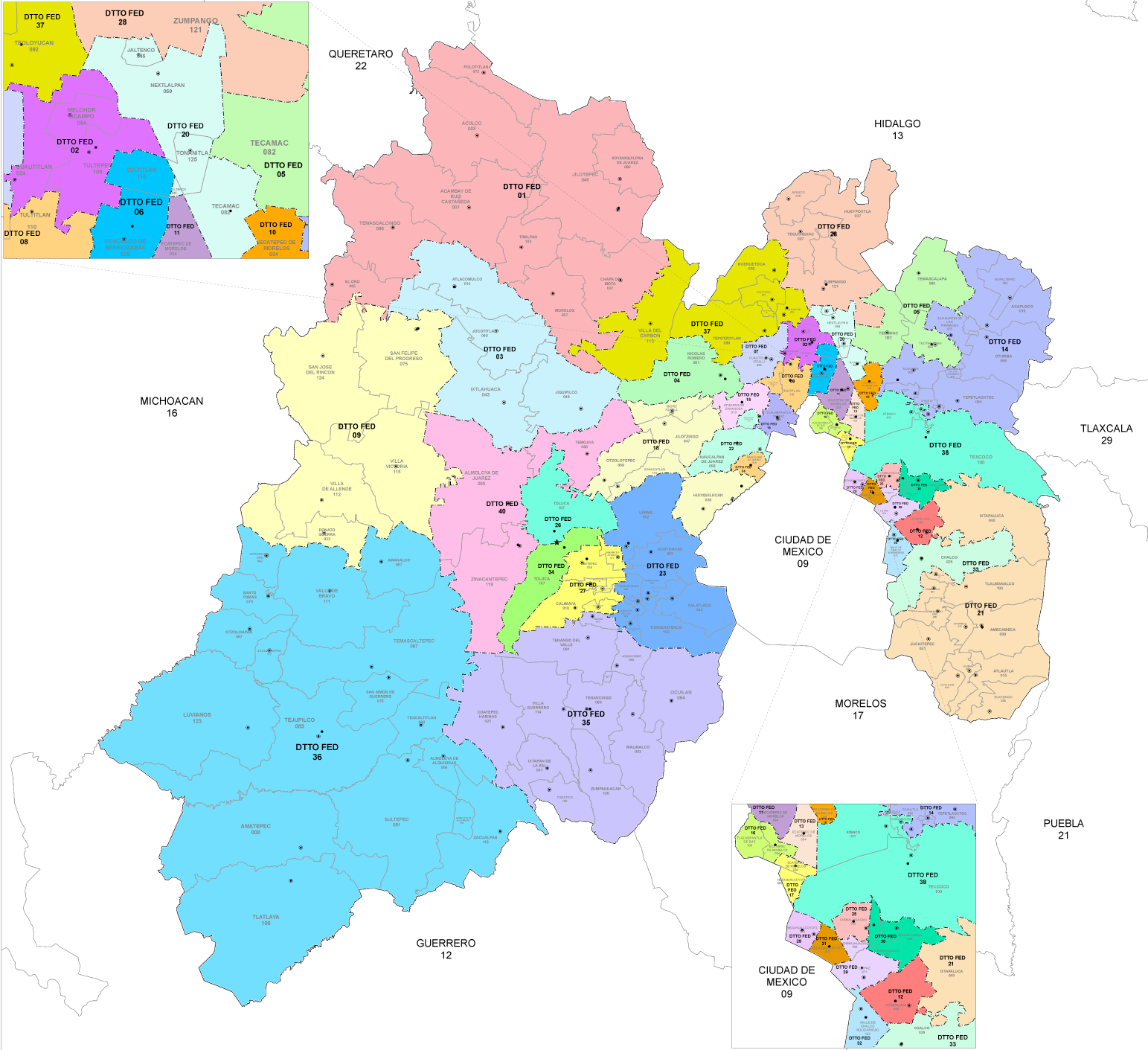
- State of Mexico's districts since 2023

Incumbent
- Member: José Luis Hernández Pérez
- Party: ▌Ecologist Green Party
- Congress: 66th (2024–2027)

District
- State: State of Mexico
- Head town: Lerma de Villada
- Coordinates: 19°17′N 99°30′W
- Covers: Almoloya del Río, Atizapán, Capulhuac, Lerma, Ocoyoacac, Texcalyacac, Tianguistenco, Xalatlaco
- PR region: Fifth
- Precincts: 126
- Population: 419,045 (2020 census)

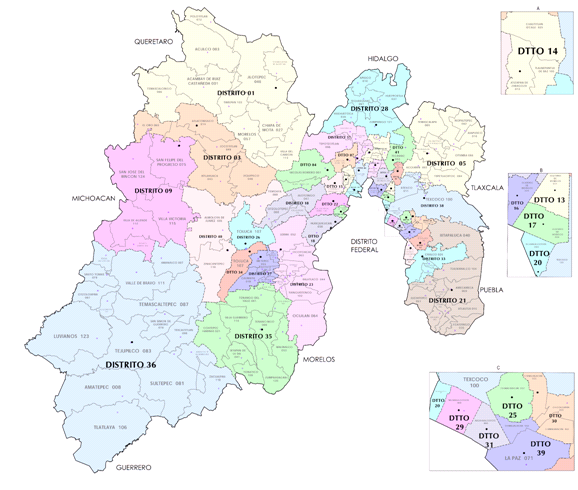
2017–2022 districting scheme

The 23rd federal electoral district of the State of Mexico (Spanish: Distrito electoral federal 23 del Estado de México) is one of the 300 electoral districts into which Mexico is divided for elections to the federal Chamber of Deputies and one of 40 such districts in the State of Mexico.

It elects one deputy to the lower house of Congress for each three-year legislative session by means of the first-past-the-post system. Votes cast in the district also count towards the calculation of proportional representation ("plurinominal") deputies elected from the fifth region.

The 23rd district was created by the 1977 electoral reforms, which increased the number of single-member seats in the Chamber of Deputies from 196 to 300. Under that plan, the State of Mexico's seat allocation rose from 15 to 34. The new districts were first contended in the 1979 mid-term election.

The current member for the district, elected in the 2024 general election, is José Luis Hernández Pérez of the Ecologist Green Party of Mexico (PVEM).

== District territory ==
Under the 2023 districting plan adopted by the National Electoral Institute (INE), which is to be used for the 2024, 2027 and 2030 federal elections, the 23rd district is located between Toluca and Mexico City and covers 126 electoral precincts (secciones electorales) across eight of the state's 125 municipalities:

- Almoloya del Río, Atizapán, Capulhuac, Lerma, Ocoyoacac, Texcalyacac, Tianguistenco and Xalatlaco.

The head town (cabecera distrital), where results from individual polling stations are gathered together and tallied, is the city of Lerma de Villada. In the 2020 census, the district reported a total population of 419,045.

== Previous districting schemes ==
Evolution of electoral district numbers
	1974	1978	1996	2005	2017	2023
State of Mexico	15	34	36	40	41	40
Chamber of Deputies	196	300				

Under the previous districting plans enacted by the INE and its predecessors, the 23rd district was situated as follows:

2017–2022

Nine municipalities in the east of the Valley of Toluca: Almoloya del Río, Atizapán, Capulhuac, Lerma, Ocoyoacac, Ocuilan, Texcalyacac, Tianguistenco and Xalatlaco. The head town was at Lerma de Villada.

2005–2017

The municipalities of Almoloya de Juárez, Amanalco, Donato Guerra, Ixtapan del Oro, Valle de Bravo, Villa de Allende and Villa Victoria. The head town was at Valle de Bravo.

1996–2005

The municipalities of Amanalco, Donato Guerra, Ixtapan del Oro, Otzoloapan, Santo Tomás, Temascaltepec, Valle de Bravo, Villa de Allende, Zacazonapan and Zinacantepec. The head town was at Valle de Bravo.

1978–1996

A portion of the municipality of Nezahualcóyotl.

== Deputies returned to Congress ==
(Mexico) National parties
- Current
- PAN
- PRI
- PT
- PVEM
- MC
- Morena
- PAZ
- Somos
- Defunct or local only
- PLM
- PNR
- PRM
- PNM
- PP
- PPS
- PARM
- PFCRN
- CON
- PANAL
- PSD
- PES
- PES
- PRD

State of Mexico's 23rd district
Election	Deputy	Party	Term	Legislature
1979	Juan Alvarado Jacco	Institutional Revolutionary Party	1979–1982	51st Congress
1982	Juan de Dios Salazar Salazar	Institutional Revolutionary Party	1982–1985	52nd Congress
1985	Juan Alvarado Jacco	Institutional Revolutionary Party	1985–1988	53rd Congress
1988	Enrique Riva Palacio Galicia	Institutional Revolutionary Party	1988–1991	54th Congress
1991	Jaime Serrano Cedillo	Institutional Revolutionary Party	1991–1994	55th Congress
1994	Virgilia Noguera Corona	Institutional Revolutionary Party	1994–1997	56th Congress
1997	Francisco Crescencio Rodríguez García	Institutional Revolutionary Party	1997–2000	57th Congress
2000	José Jaimes García	Institutional Revolutionary Party	2000–2003	58th Congress
2003	Víctor González Huerta	Institutional Revolutionary Party	2003–2006	59th Congress
2006	María Mercedes Colín Guadarrama	Institutional Revolutionary Party	2006–2009	60th Congress
2009	José Ignacio Pichardo Lechuga	Institutional Revolutionary Party	2009–2012	61st Congress
2012	Blanca Estela Gómez Carmona	Institutional Revolutionary Party	2012–2015	62nd Congress
2015	José Ignacio Pichardo Lechuga	Institutional Revolutionary Party	2015–2018	63rd Congress
2018	David Orihuela Nava	National Regeneration Movement	2018–2021	64th Congress
2021	Martha Azucena Camacho Reynoso	National Regeneration Movement	2021–2024	65th Congress
2024	José Luis Hernández Pérez	Ecologist Green Party of Mexico	2024–2027	66th Congress

== Presidential elections ==
State of Mexico's 23rd district
Election	District won by	Party or coalition	%
2018	Andrés Manuel López Obrador	Juntos Haremos Historia	55.1933
2024	Claudia Sheinbaum Pardo	Sigamos Haciendo Historia	62.2148
