= Almoloya del Río =

- Town & Municipality
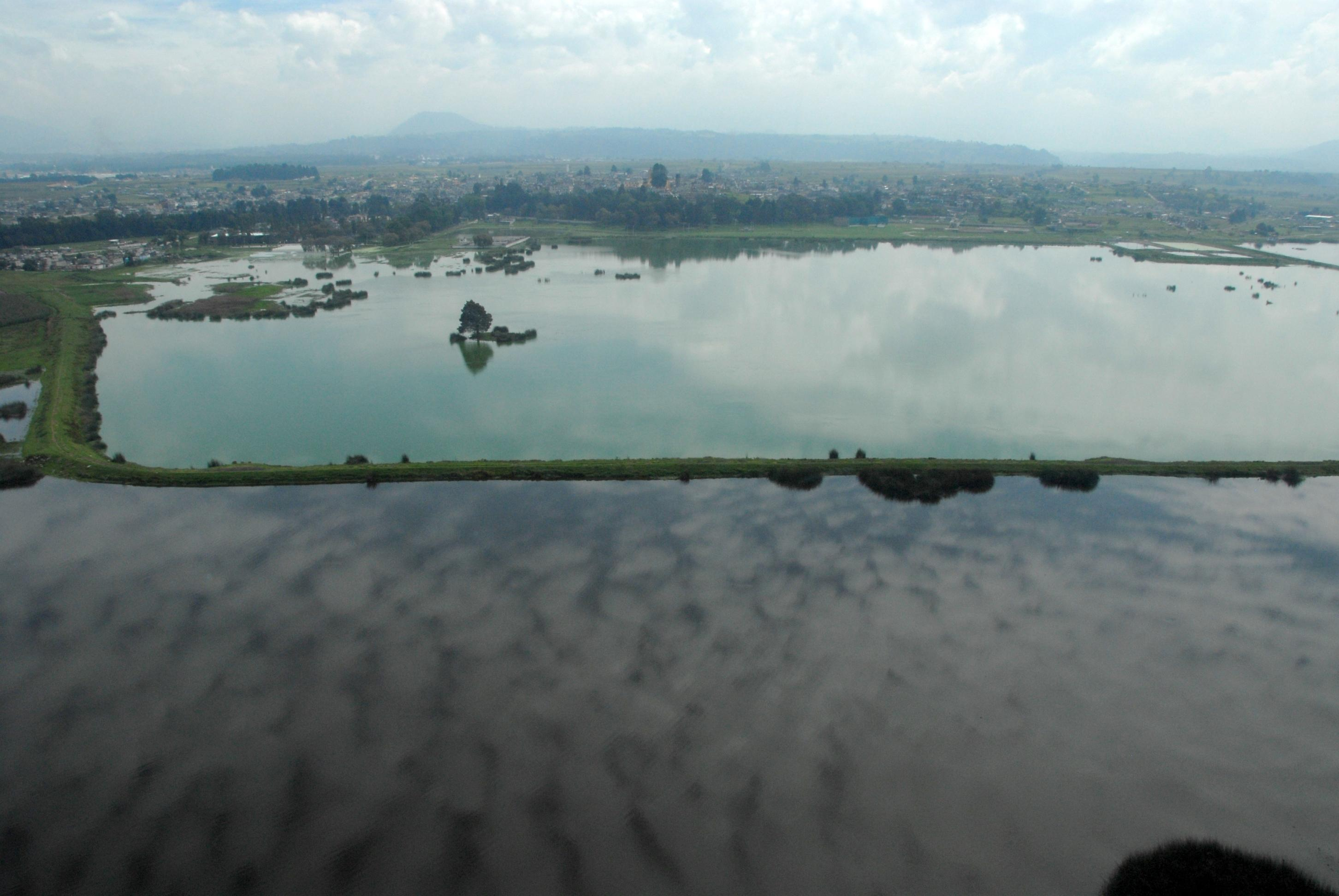

- Coat of arms

- Location in Mexico
- Coordinates: 19°09′31″N 99°29′19″W
- Country: Mexico
- State: State of Mexico
- Founded: Between 650-850 AD
- Municipal Status: 1847

Government
  - Municipal President: Oscar Galan (2025–)

Area
  - Municipality: 6.44 km^{2} (2.49 sq mi)
- Elevation (of seat): 2,600 m (8,500 ft)

Population (2005) Municipality
  - Municipality: 8,939
  - Seat: 7,992
- Time zone: UTC-6 (Central)
- Postal code (of seat): 52540
- Area code: 713
- Website: Official site

Almolya del Río is a town and municipality located in the State of Mexico 26 km from the state capital of Toluca. It is located 2,600 meters above sea level.

== The town ==
=== History ===
While the area had been long inhabited by hunter-gatherers, the first sedentary farming communities appeared in this area around 5000 to 1000 BC. Almoloya was founded on the edges of the marshes of Lake Chicnahuapan. In the Pre-Classic period, agriculture intensified and tribal communities began to develop. By the High Classic period, villages with ceremonial centers had developed as well as the cultivation of corn, beans and vegetables on chinampas in Lake Chicnahuapan and the Chicnahuapan River, now known as the Lerma River. The village of Almoloya was founded between 650 and 850 AD by the Otomí and Matlatzinca people. The patron divinity was the Night Jaguar from the Olmec culture and the ceremonial center was called Xiutépetl Xaxalpa.

Mixcoatl conquered Almoloya del Río, along with Toluca, Tenango, Malinalco and Zoquitzinco. This was part of the expansion of the Tepanec empire which included many of the peoples of the Valley of Toluca. Aztec conquest came in 1476 under leader Axayacatl putting the town under the jurisdiction of Tacuba. Later, in 1521, Spaniard Gonzalo de Sandoval took over the town along with the rest of the valley, putting it under the jurisdiction of Toluca. The Franciscans came shortly thereafter to evangelize the native population, very likely building a small, temporary church where the current church stands. In 1528, the town was part of the encomienda of Juan Gutiérrez Altamirano, a cousin of Hernán Cortés, who had a hacienda named Ateneo. He also set up a hacienda just outside the town of Almoloya. In the 16th and 17th centuries the town church, San Miguel Arcangel was built. In the 18th century, the town of Metepec had grown sufficiently that it became a jurisdiction, which Almoloya belonged to. Viceregal authorities mandated that Indians living in scattered small communities in this valley be grouped into four larger communities; one of these communities was Almoloya By 1808, the town itself had grown sufficiently that it had jurisdiction over three other communities: San Mateo Texcalyacac, Santa Cruz Atizapán, Santa María Nativitas and San Pedro Techuchulco. During the Mexican War of Independence, Ignacio Rayón's troops fought royalist troops in the fields between this town and Santiago Tianguistenco.

On 26 October 1884, 300 people led by Friar Isidro García attacked forty evangelists killing Pastor Landa, Nicanor Gomez and Nicolas Muciño.

In 1889, the town had a territory of 18 km2 and a population of 3,740 people.

During the Mexican Revolution, the townspeople's loyalty was split between the federal government and Zapatista and other revolutionaries. In 1913, Genovevo de la O. took the town's municipal president, Apolonio Vázquez prisoner and nearly executed him. In 1915, fighting between federalists and revolutionaries resulted in the burning of the municipal palace and the destruction of almost all of the municipality's records. A small portion was saved by Juan Hernández.

Between 1914 and 1918, a series of epidemics such as typhoid and famines struck the town, resulting in the reduction of the population.

Between the 1930s and 1950s a number of work projects began to divert water from the Lerma River to supply nearby Mexico City. This eventually led to the disappearance of Lake Chignahuapan. These works included an aqueduct and other actions such as dynamiting to divert the water to the city. In addition to the disappearance of the lake, this diversion has had seriously negative consequences to the Lerma River itself by blocking off the springs that feed the river. Overexploitation of these springs is also causing the dropping of water tables that will eventually cause the springs to dry up altogether.

By 1995 only 55 people spoke an indigenous language and by 2005, only 31 did. As of 2005, the town had a population of 7,992 people.

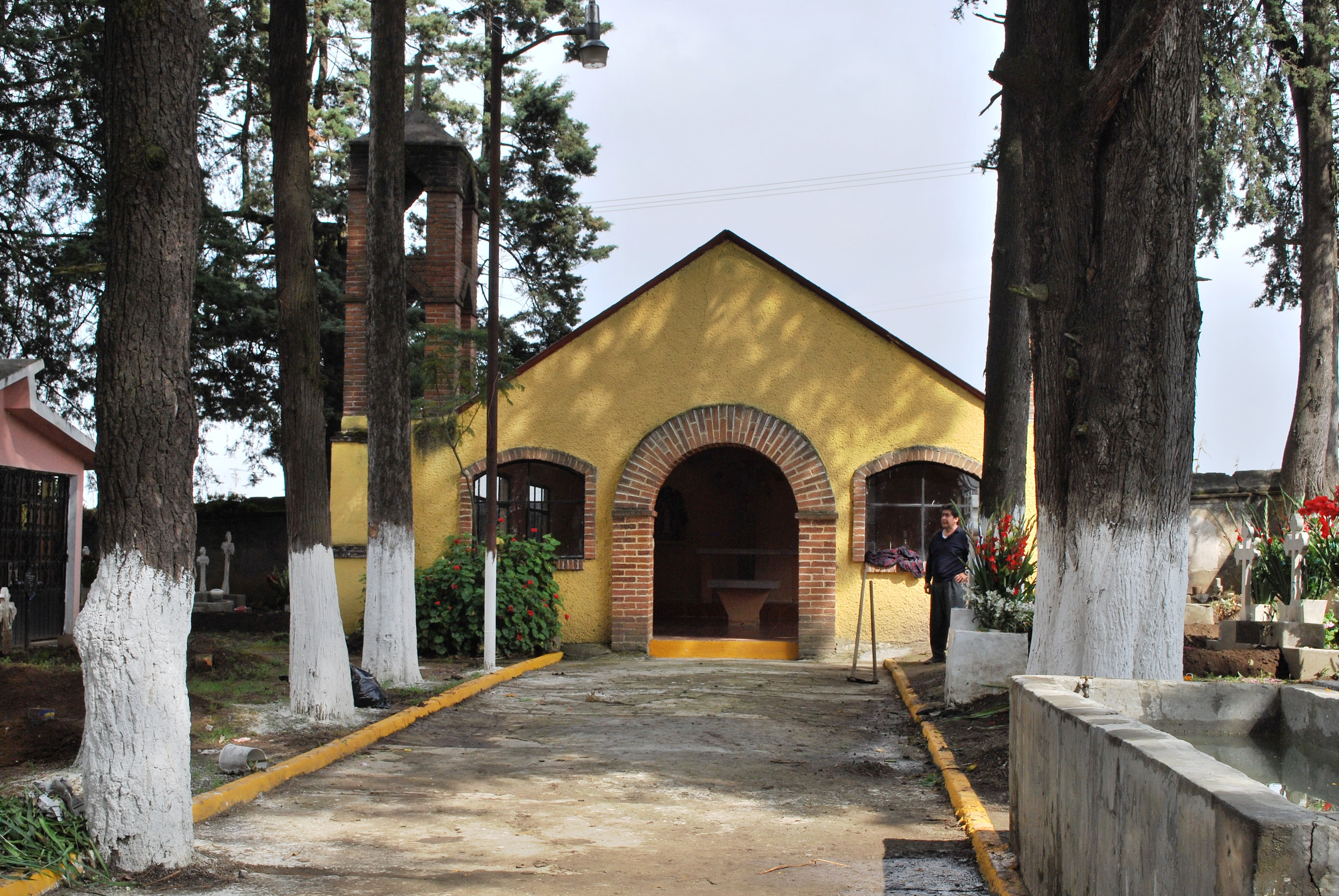

=== Notable sites ===
The town church, called San Miguel Arcángel, is its most outstanding feature, built between the 16th and 17th centuries. It is dedicated to Our Lord of Burgos. The church faces west, towards where Lake Chignahupan was, with a view of the Nevado de Toluca. In the late 19th century, the stone wall to the north was constructed and its tower is thought to have been built around this time as well. Its bells were cast in 1947. According to sources, to achieve a better sound, many women of the town donated much of their gold jewelry. Many of the church's improvements at this time were the work of a religious fraternity called "La Agrupacion." The church has two side naves and one main nave, at the back of which if the main altar, whose age is undetermined. Above the vestibule is the choir, which used to have a large organ. In its interior are sculptures of the Archangel Michael, Saint Augustine, Archangel Gabriel, and four of Christ.

The Esmeralda Clock was made in 1926 in France with its base made in Mexico. It originally was located in Mexico City. It was given to the municipality as a token of appreciated for the sale of its water to the city. It was placed in its current position in 1940. As the town is located on the tallest hill in the municipality, the tones of this clock can be heard in the nearby communities, with many people using these chimes to mark their day.

The Parque Ecoturístico was inaugurated in 2007 in the marshes of the old lake. These marshes are home to a wide variety of species including a third of the bird species native to the State of Mexico. It is also a wintering ground for birds that migrate from the United States and Canada.

=== Economy ===
As the principal economic activity of the town is the production of denim clothing, every year in September is the "Feria de Vestido y Costura" (Festival of Clothing and Sewing).Garments produced include rebozos, stoles and embroidered wool skirts. Traditional garments of the region, especially those associated with the feast of Corpus Christi are a specialty as well. Many of these garments can be bought at the weekly Sunday tianguis or open-air market.

Almoloya is known for mariachi bands that make their living at Plaza Garibaldi in Mexico City. The best-known of these bands are called "Benito Juarez" and "Miguel Hidalgo".

=== Festivals ===
This town celebrates Carnaval every year in honor of the Virgin of Dolores. During this celebration, folkdances such as the "Paseo de Locos" (Parade of Crazies) los "Vaqueros" (the Cowboys) las "Pastoras" (the Shepardesses) and " Señor Santiago" (Lord Santiago).

This town is also the home of the annual "Biker Fantasy Fest," also known as the "International Camping Biker" which started in 1994. This is a rock-and-roll and motorcyclists' event, billed as non-violent and family-friendly. The 2007 event expected 50,000 people over the three-day event. This event mostly features Mexican rock bands such as Las victimas del Dr. Cerebro, La Dolorosa, Los Gatos (band), Congal Tijuana, Panteón Rococó and Maldita Vecindad.

== The municipality ==
As municipal seat, the town of Almoloya del Río currently has governing jurisdiction over only two other communities, Tecalco to the north of the main town and Texcoapan to the south. These two are divided into the following communities: Emiliano Zapata, El Calavario, La Puerta, Loma Linda, San Miguel, Duraznitos, Loma Alta, Florida (El Jaguey), Mirasol and Mezapa. Together the combined municipality had a population of 8,939 in 2005.It is bordered by the municipalities of Santa Cruz Atizapán, Santiago Tianguistenco, Texcalyacac, Xalatlaco and San Antonio la Isla. It has a territory of 6.44 square km. The topography of this small municipality consists of a hill of volcanic origin, on which the town lies, surrounded by smaller, rolling hills and the lakebed of the old Lake Chignahuapan. From here the Lerma River has its start from a number of springs that originate here.

On 26 March 1847, Almoloya del Río became a municipality. In 1854, the communities under its jurisdiction were San Pedro Techuchulco, San Mateo Texcalyacac, Santa Cruz Atizapán and the Rancho de Almoloya. However, its territory was reduced in 1866 when the municipality of Texcalyacac was erected and again in 1870 when Santa Cruz Atizapán separated.

The area has a rainy season from April to October and a dry season from November to March with a total annual rainfall of 871.7 mm. Average temperature is about 11.7C with temperatures as high as 18C and as low as 1.5C.

The principal economic activity, the production of clothing, is based on the town. Some handcrafts are produced including woven baskets for tortillas and flower arrangements. Outside the town, there is still agriculture, primarily the production of animal feed and corn on communal and ejido lands. Cattle raising is also practiced here.
