= Santiago Tianguistenco =

- City
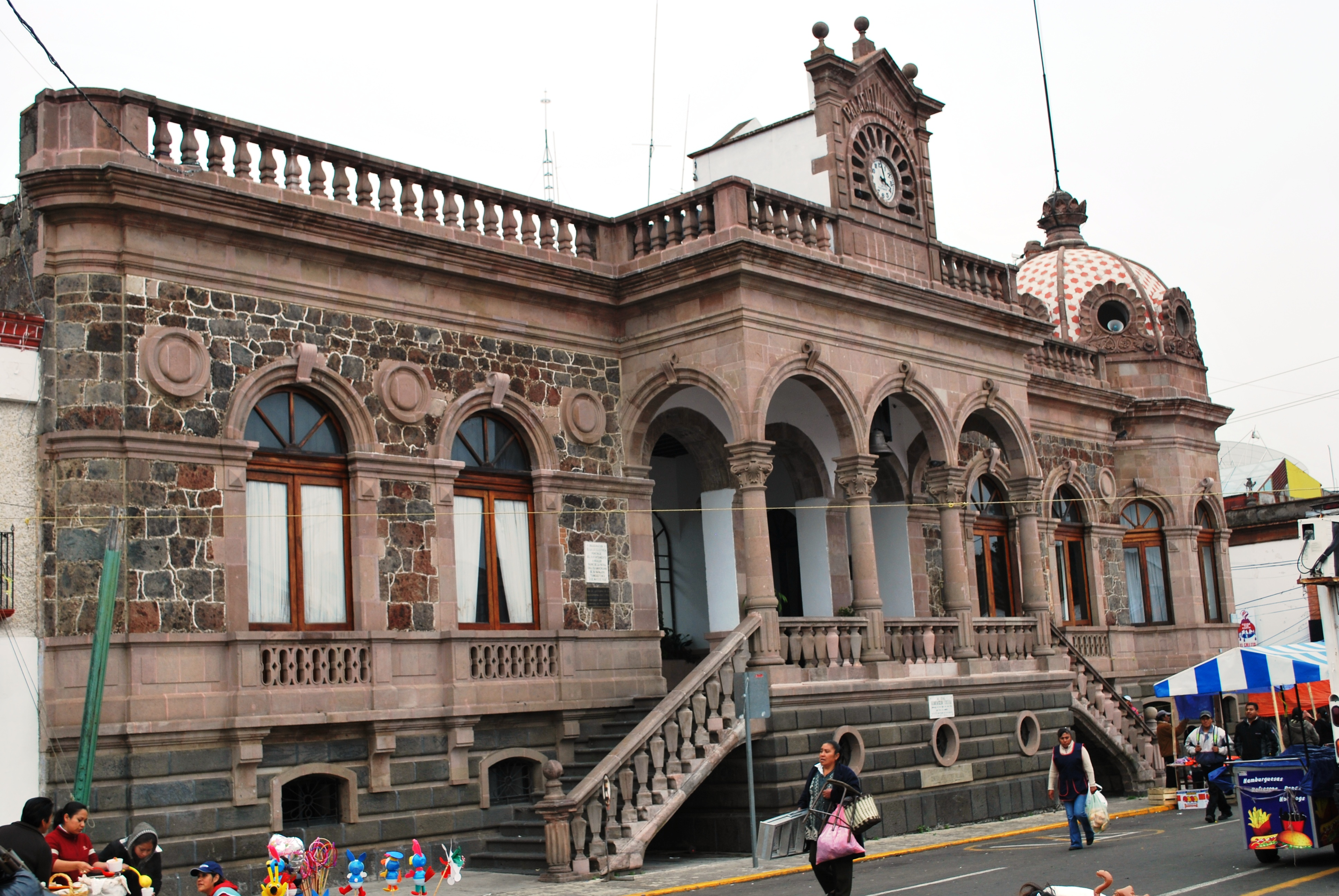
- Municipal Palace of Santiago Tianguistenco

- Location in Mexico
- Coordinates: 19°10′50″N 99°28′06″W
- Country: Mexico
- State: State of Mexico
- Municipality: Tianguistenco
- Founded: 1500s

Government
  - Municipal President: Alfredo Rodríguez Castro

Area
  - City: 121.53 km^{2} (46.92 sq mi)
- Elevation (of seat): 2,620 m (8,600 ft)

Population (2005) Municipality
  - City: 64,365
  - Seat: 19,033
- Time zone: UTC-6 (Central)
- Postal code (of seat): 52600

Municipality location in the State of Mexico

Santiago Tianguistenco (Spanish: [sanˈtjaɣo tjaŋɡisˈteŋko]), often simply called Santiago by locals, is a city located in Mexico State about thirty km south of the state capital of Toluca. It is the municipal seat for the municipality of Tianguistenco. It is located in the southwest part of the Valley of Toluca at the edge of the Ajusco mountain range that separates it from Mexico City. The name Tianguistenco (Tyanguistengko) is from Nahuatl and means “at the edge of the tianguis,” which is a traditional Aztec market. (Santiago comes from the town's early Spanish name of “Villa de Santiago.”) The section of the city where the industrial park is still bears this name. Historically, the area was known as having one of the richest and best-stocked markets in the Toluca Valley. Today, it is still home to a large permanent municipal market as well as a weekly tianguis that covers much of the historic center.

In addition to the commerce, the municipality is home to a major industrial site that produces commercial trucks. The municipality is also home to a community called Gualupita, famous for its wool items, Santiago Tilapa, which as a patron festival known in Mexico State and the Atenco Hacienda where bullfighting in Mexico got its start.

== History ==
No archeological finds in this area date before the Postclassic period. However, Olmec era finds in neighboring Almoloya del Río indicate that there was human inhabitants here at least as early as 1300 BCE. Evidence of Teotihuacan settlement or influence was found in the same area. Most of the archeological finds are concentrated on what used to be the shores of a lake in this area and the Tetépetl Mountain. In the municipality proper, the remains of a population center called Teotenanco appear between 1050 and 1260 C. E. with constructions reminiscent of Teotihuacan. In the center is a ceremonial precinct that was probably the center of a local theocracy. The earliest known ethnic group here is the Matlatzincas. This area, along with the rest of the Toluca Valley, was conquered by Axayacatl and brought into the Aztec Empire in the 1470s.

When the Aztec Empire fell in 1521, the lands around Tenochtitlan-Mexico City were mostly divided up into encomiendas. Around 1523, the territory of Tianguistenco was part of the encomienda of Xalatlaco and Atlapulco, which were controlled by Leonel de Cervantes. The encomiendo remained in the family until 1617. It then became a minor province of Matlazingo. For much of the rest of the colonial period, the area would be a dependency of a number of political entities such as Metepec and Tenango del Valle, with parts of the current municipality such as the communities of Coatepec and Huhutitlán belonging to Malinalco. Many of the indigenous villages were governed under a system called the Republica de Naturales (Republic of Natives), which gave a certain amount of autonomy. This republic was initiated in the first half of the 17th century with records indicating that Tomás de Alarcón as governor of Tianguistenco. However, by 1778, this lateral governing system was abolished by the viceroy.

Economically, the most important center for much of the colonial period was the Purisima Concepcion Hacienda, which was established by Hernán Cortés himself on part of his lands as the Marques of the Valley of Oaxaca. It remained in Cortés family hands. However, the rest of the lands that make up the current municipality switch hands constantly among a number of political and economic entities over the colonial period.

By the second half of the 18th century, the town of Tianguistenco had grown in size and importance to merit a customs house that covered the areas of San Nicolás Coatepec, San Lorenzo Huehuetitlán, San Pedro Tlaltizapán, San Bartolomé Capulhuac and Santa María Coaxusco. The town also became the center for mail service in the area around the same time. The parish church was begun in 1756.

During the Mexican War of Independence, Miguel Hidalgo y Costilla passed through here in 1810 with his army. In 1812, guerillas were operating in the nearby Ajusco Mountains under Manuel Gonzalez and Ignacio López Rayón was stationed here for a time. Most of the fighting seen here were incursions by guerrillas in the mountain areas. The first municipal government under the Cadiz Constitution was formed here in 1820 with the town of Tianguistenco as the seat. This government would recognize Mexican Independence in 1821. In 1825, this municipality was reorganized as part of the State of Mexico. This municipality included the communities of de Xalatlaco, Capulhuac, San Pedro Tlaltizapán, Santiago Tilapa, La Magdalena Los Reyes, Santa Cruz Atizapán, Almoloya del Río, Texcalyacac, San Pedro Techuchulco and Santa María Guadalupe Yancuictlalpan.

The first of these to break away and form its own municipality was Capulhuac in 1827, with the community of Tlaltizapán joining Capulhuac shortly thereafter. Almoloya del Río, Santa Cruz Atizapán, San Mateo Texcalyacac and San Pedro Techuchulco were separated by the state legislature in 1847 to form the municipality of Almoloya del Rio. Santa María de la Asunción Xalatlaco separated in 1872. The community of Tianguistenco was officially declared a town in 1878 with the formal name of Tianguistenco de Galeana. San Nicolás Coatepec and San Lorenzo Huehuetitlán were added to the municipality in 1857 and 1863 with Tlaltizapán returning in 1891.

During the Reform War, the town and the Purisima Concepcion Hacienda were sacked in 1857. Many here supported the Conservative cause forming the Puente Brigade. This brigade fought in a number of battles including the occupation of Lerma.

The municipal palace was begun in 1903 and completed in 1910. The inauguration of the palace formed part of the Centennial celebrations here. During the Mexican Revolution, the town initially supported Francisco I. Madero against Porfirio Díaz. However, Emiliano Zapata soon grew unsatisfied with Madero and the Liberation Army of the South began to fight anew. The town became Zapatista. Genovevo de la O and federal forces fought over the town several times with possession changing hands until the end of the war.

The municipal seat was declared a city by the state legislature in 1996.

The family of Carlos Hank Gonzalez, a powerful political figure in the second half of the 20th century, has bought a significant quantity of land in Tianguistenco, leading to the somewhat derogatory term of “Hankilandia” for the municipality. In the late 1990s, the community of San Nicolas Coatepec, one of the larger communities outside the municipal seat, sought to separate from Tianguistenco claiming they were marginalized due to the fact that most here are indigenous. They proclaimed the community as an “autonomous municipality.” However, this auto proclamation was not accepted by municipal or state authorities. This same community denounced the offering of lands to the family the local PRI politicians to Jorge Hank Rhon in 2001. The community claims the lands are communal property.

In the early 21st century, a major section of the highway linking Santa Cruz Atizapan and Santiago Tianguistenco was opened to alleviate chronic traffic problems in the area. This section is part of a large highway built to link western Mexico City with the state of Morelos. Prior to its construction, traffic was distributed among the many local roads. Another highway connection Tianguistenco with Lerma, called Lerma-Tres Marias, has been held up due to environmental concerns.

== The city ==
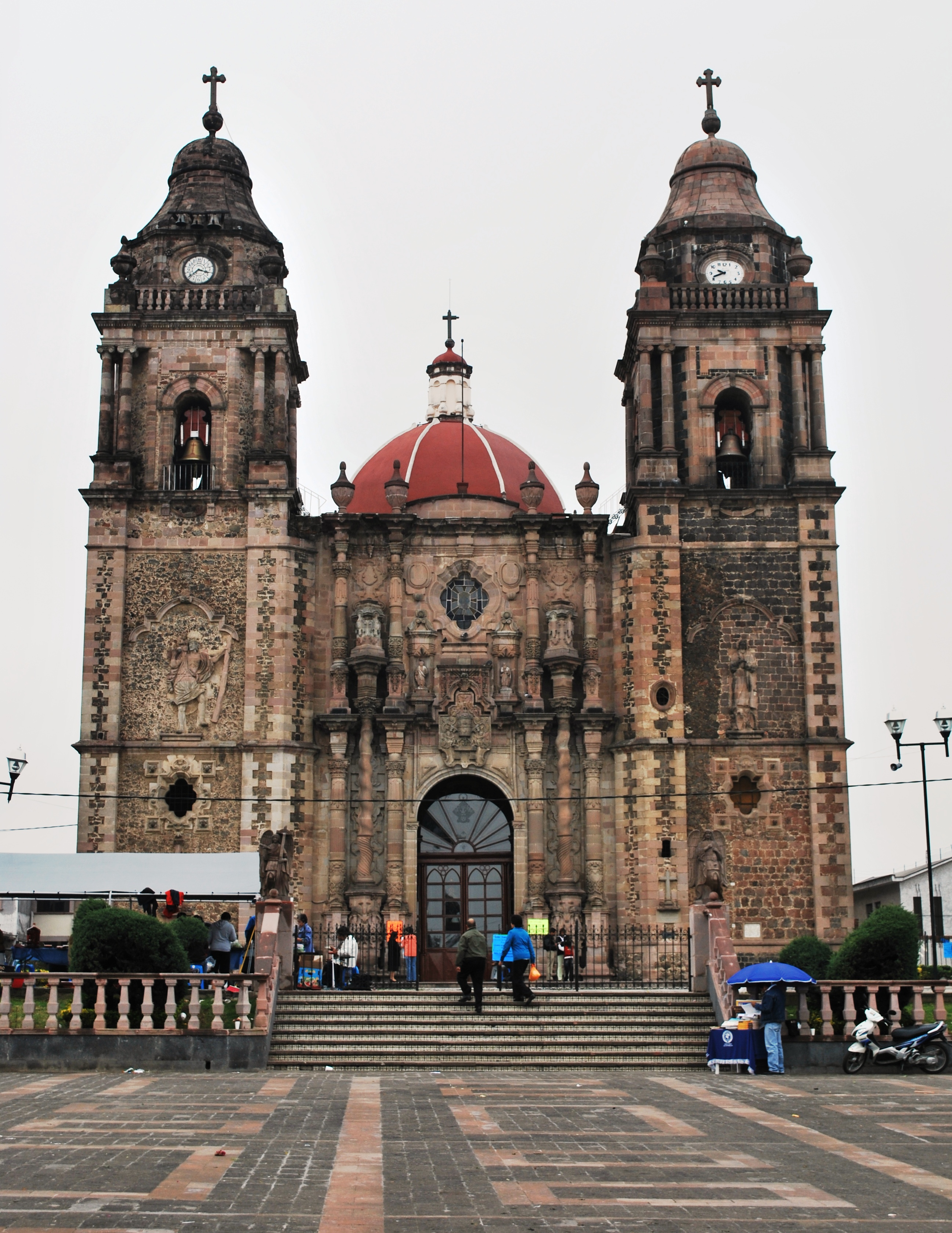
Church of Santa María del Buen Suceso

The town has narrow streets and some traditional adobe houses with red tile roofs can still be seen. The historic center of town is filled with gardens public buildings and churches based on past architectural styles. The parish church is called Santa María del Buen Suceso and was constructed in the 18th century and faces the main plaza. The church is “Ultra-Baroque.” The facade has two bodies, and columns three different decorative styles. The cornice is formed by sections of entablature over the capitals of each column. The church was financed by José de la Boda, a wealthy French miner and has a similar appearance to the Santa Prisca Church in Taxco. The bell towers are inspired by those of the Metropolitan Cathedral in Mexico City. This church is the most important historically but there are more than a dozen other temples in town, some of which date from the 16th century, that have been designated as historical monuments by INAH.

To the right of the parish church, also facing the plaza, is the municipal palace. Across from the palace is the municipal market. Typical dishes for the area, which can be found in the market, include moles, tamales, and barbacoa. During the rainy season, dishes based on wild mushrooms, fresh corn and green fava beans are popular. Fruit liquors are produced and consumed here. One of the specialty is a sweet paste made from tejocotes wrapped in corn husks, amaranth bars and a kind of brittle made with squash seeds. Tuesday is market day, when stands set up on the streets of the city (called a tianguis) supplement the goods sold in the permanent market. The ancient market here was one of the richest and most complete of the pre-Hispanic era. Today the tianguis market tradition is the best-preserved in the state, according to historian Alva Margarita Cervera, attraction about 3,500 merchants for the day. The city is the regional commercial center as well as a center for pilgrims on their way to Chalma.

Guadalupe Yancuictlalpan, is an integrated suburb of the municipal seat on the south side. The community is locally known as Gualupita (contraction of Guadalupita) due to the church dedicated to the Virgin of Guadalupe. It is famous for this wool knit and woven items, the only craft maintained in the municipality. Woven items are made on colonial style wood looms many of which have been in families for generations. Textile arts here date back at least to 1472 using fibers from the maguey plant. After the Spanish arrival, these fibers were mixed with wool. Each weekend in this community, hundreds of craftsmen come to offer their wares such as sweaters, vests, scarves, hats and coats with prices ranging from 20 pesos to 4,500, made from wool, cotton and some synthetic fibers but the most representative pieces are made with undyed wool. The most expensive items are custom-made, with a fine coat costing as much as 6,000 pesos. Traditional designs found on many items are generally from the Mazahua, Otomi and Nahua ethnic groups. The community holds an Atole Festival on 2 May. On this day, residents of Gualupita head to neighboring Ocuilán to bring back 30 kilos of laurel branches one by one to the town church. When the first participant arrives back to Gualupita, the church bells sound out. The annual event has had as many 1,500 participants.

The major economic engine for the municipality is the Daimler Vehículos Comerciales Mexico plant, locally referred to simply as “La Mercedes.” The building has been in operation since 1969 and is the only place where the Coronado tractor trailer is made. It began as a factory named Autocar. Ten years later it became a store affiliated with the Famsa chain until it was acquired by Mercedes-Benz in 1991. Since then, the factory has produced more than 272,000 vehicles. The trucks are primarily produced for export, mostly to the United States, Canada and Latin America.

== The municipality ==
As municipal seat, the city of Santiago Tianguistenco is the local governing authority for almost sixty other named communities with a combined territory of 121.53 km^{2} (46.92 sq mi). Less than a third of the municipality's population lives in the town proper. The municipality is bordered by the municipalities of Metepec, Capulhuac, Ocoyocac, Xalatlaco, Ocuilan, Joquicingo, Texcalyacac, Almoloya del Río, Santa Cruz Atizapan, San Antonio la Isla, Calimaya, Chapultepec and Mexicaltzingo with the Federal District to the east and the state of Morelos to the south.

The municipality lies in the Trans-Mexican Volcanic Belt in the sub-province of the Lakes and Volcanoes of Anahuac. 35% of the municipality is mountainous, 30% is arable and the rest is developed. The topography of the municipality varies due to its size. The eastern portions are highest as they are in the Ajusco mountains with an average altitude of over 3,600 meters above sea level. The rest of the municipal is part of the Lerma River plain, which close to level, sloping slightly at around 2,600 meters. Within the municipality there are a number of small volcanoes such as Los Cuates, Santiago Tilapa, Las Ratas, Teconto and others that break up the plains area. The main surface water is the Lerma River, which crosses the municipality from north to south, although there are a large number of small intermittent streams, and the smaller Jalatlaco River. Along this river are waterworks constructed in the 1940s to supply water to Mexico City. There also a number of wells here with the same purpose. The climate here is fairly cold (C(E) (m) (w)) with freezing temperatures expected around 100 days per year between October and May. Wild vegetation varies depending on the altitude. The mountain regions have forests of oak, pine and fir, with the lower levels having scrub and grasslands. Most fauna here is small and medium-sized mammals such as coyotes, skunks, rabbits and squirrels with reptiles such as rattlesnakes and birds such as crows, ducks and quail. The area used to have deer, buzzards and wildcats, but these have disappeared.

The major economic engine for the municipality is the Daimler Vehículos Comerciales Mexico plant, locally referred to simply as “La Mercedes.” The main Industry is automotive production centered around vehicle manufacture, design, and vehicle R&D. The building has been in operation since 1969 and is the only place where the Coronado tractor trailer is made. It began as a factory named Autocar. Ten years later it became a store affiliated with the Famsa chain until it was acquired by Mercedes-Benz de Mexico in 1991. Since then, the factory has produced more than 272,000 Mercedes-Benz vehicles. A Daimler Trucks factory is also located in this facility, which produces its Freightliner Trucks in its own plant. The trucks are primarily produced for export, mostly to the United States, Canada and Latin America.

Other industry consists of food processing of milk and meat products as well as industries located in the Parque Industrial Santiago Tianguistenco. Agriculture is still a significant economic activity of the municipality growing corn, carrots, oats and fava beans. Livestock raised here include cattle, sheep, pigs and domestic fowl. There is one ejido belonging to the community of San Pedro Tlaltizapan on the west side of the Lerma River. This was established in 1978.

There are a number of significant locations outside of the city area. One of these is the Sanctuary of Santiago Tilapa. Each year in August this community holds their celebration of the feast day of their patron saint, which has become known in the State of Mexico. The tradition of a dance group called the Aventureros began in the mid-20th century when a group of muleteers, peasants, shepherds and others began a dance tradition that gained a following called the “Dance of the Muleteers.” The dance is formed by sixteen sequential squares called “The arrival,” “In the name of God,” “The sale,” “The unloading” and others. The dancers have roles such as “the patron,” “the load bearers,” “the sufferers” and more, each with his own outfit and colors to indicate his part.

The Atenco Hacienda is not the largest hacienda in Mexico, but it is the oldest, according to a plaque on its main gate. It is the oldest livestock producer on the continent, a tradition still maintained, mostly producing bulls for bullfights. The hacienda was founded by a cousin of Hernán Cortés called Juan Gutiérrez Altamirano around 1528 with an area of about 30,000 hectares and 2,000 workers. It continued to operate until the Mexican Revolution when it was divided into sixteen parts. The main house and other buildings now only occupy about 3,000 square meters with five workers.

Originally, fighting bulls were brought to Mexico in the 16th century supposedly as “guard animals” These bulls were of Navarre stock brought from Spain. As these animals were unknown in the New World, native peoples of the surrounding areas would not enter the hacienda's land for fear of them. The Casco of the hacienda is considered to be the origin of Mexican bullfighting, when the corrals for the bulls were built, along with the chapel in 1550. The first formal bullring in Mexico was built here in 1820, called El Tenadero. The first Mexican bullfighter to fight in Madrid, Ponciano Diaz, was a native of this area who went to Spain to try his luck in 1880. Some of the bullfighters who came through here include Juan Belmonte, Rodolfo Gaona and Rafael Gómez Ortega.

== Notable people ==
- Salvador Sánchez, boxer.
