= Guadalupe Yancuictlalpan =

Gualupita Yancuictlalpan
- Guadalupe Yancuictlalpan
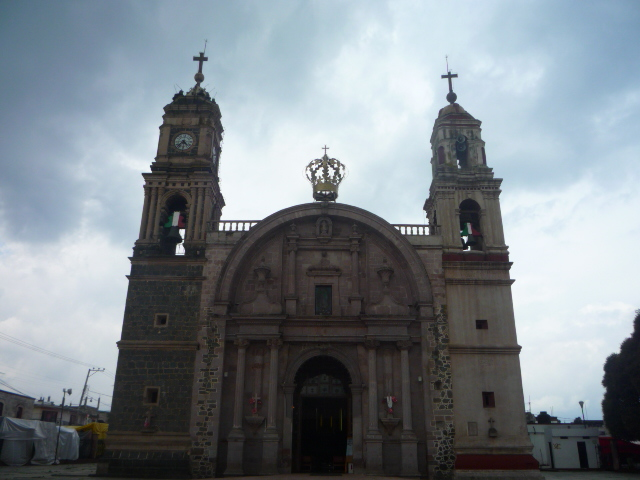
- Church of our Lady of Guadalupe
- Interactive map of Gualupita Yancuictlalpan
- Coordinates: 19°10′59″N 99°27′30″W
- Country: Mexico
- State: State of Mexico
- Municipality: Tianguistenco, State of Mexico
- Elevation (of seat): 2,600 m (8,500 ft)

Population (2000)
  - Total: 6,385
- Time zone: UTC-6 (CST)
- Website: (in Spanish) site

Guadalupe Yancuictlalpan (usually referred to as simply Gualupita) is a small community, which is part of the municipality of Tianguistenco, Mexico State. The name Yancuictlalpan is most likely derived from the Nahuatl word yancuic, which means "new" and the word tlal.li which means "land".

Located 60 kilometers from Mexico City, and 30 from Toluca. The community is famous for the wool knit and woven items that are made by the local artisans. Each weekend takes place a market of textile handicrafts in the main street.

== History ==
The construction of the main temple began in 1679 and ended in 1789, as it is indicated by an inscription in the South Tower of the temple.

== Demographics ==
In 1990 it has a population of 2812 inhabitants and 6385 in 2000, which represents the 10.9% of the total population of the municipality.

== Government ==
Gualupita belongs to the municipality of Tianguistenco, and therefore belongs to the Eleventh District Court whose seat is Tenango de Arista; the sixth State electoral district with headquarters in Santiago Tianguistenco and 35th federal electoral district in the city of Tenancingo. Local community is governed by its delegates.

== Economy ==
Most economic activity is produced by artisanal and industrial textiles trade. Agriculture and livestock are little practised activities. On Saturday the community organizes a "tianguis" where fresh fruits and vegetables are sold. On Sunday, the local people sells artisanal and industrial clothes.

== Handicrafts ==
Woven items are made on colonial style wood looms many of which have been in families for generations. Textile arts here date back at least to 1472 using fibers from the maguey plant. After the Spanish arrival, these fibers were mixed with wool. The local people produces zarapes, mañanitas, sweaters, etc.
