= Mercedes Colín Guadarrama =

Mexican politician

- Born: 24 September 1967 (age 58); State of Mexico, Mexico
- Occupation: Politician
- Political party: PRI

María Mercedes Colín Guadarrama (born 24 September 1967) is a Mexican politician affiliated with the Institutional Revolutionary Party (PRI). In the 2006 general election she was elected to the Chamber of Deputies to represent the State of Mexico's 23rd district during the 60th session of Congress.
