= José Jaimes García =

Mexican politician

- Born: 5 May 1952 (age 74); Temascaltepec de González, State of Mexico, Mexico
- Occupation: Politician
- Political party: PRI

José Jaimes García (born 5 May 1952) is a Mexican politician from the Institutional Revolutionary Party (PRI). In the 2000 general election he was elected to the Chamber of Deputies to represent the State of Mexico's 23rd district during the 58th session of Congress.
