= Cristina Martinez (chef) =

American chef

- Born: Capulhuac, Mexico
- Culinary career
- Cooking style: Mexican
- Current restaurant(s): South Philly Barbacoa, Casa Mexico

Cristina Martinez is a Mexican chef and immigration activist in Philadelphia, Pennsylvania. She is the founder of South Philly Barbacoa, which Bon Appétit named one of the top ten best new restaurants in America in 2016. In 2022, she won a James Beard Foundation Award for Best Chef, Mid-Atlantic.

== Early life ==
Martinez grew up in Capulhuac de Mirafuentes in the State of Mexico, a town where most families make their living from barbacoa production. She learned barbacoa preparation from her father beginning at age six, including butchering lambs and managing underground cooking pits lined with maguey leaves. Martinez fled Mexico to escape domestic violence and crossed the border from Juárez into the United States as an undocumented immigrant.

She found a job in Philadelphia as a pastry chef in an Italian restaurant, where she met and married former husband Benjamin Miller, a U.S. citizen. Martinez was fired from the restaurant when they discovered her undocumented status, and she began cooking food for other Mexican workers in her apartment.

== Career ==
As demand grew for Martinez's home-made barbacoa, she and Miller began selling tacos from a pushcart on weekends. In 2015, they opened a permanent restaurant, South Philly Barbacoa. In 2016, Bon Appétit magazine named it one of the top ten best new restaurants in America.

In 2017, Univision produced a Spanish-language podcast about Martinez, called Mejor vete, Cristina ("You Better Leave, Cristina"), which won Mejor Cobertura Multimedia (Best Multimedia Coverage) at the 2018 Ortega y Gasset Awards. Martinez was also featured on an episode of the Netflix series Chef's Table in 2018.

In 2022, Martinez won a James Beard Foundation Award for Best Chef, Mid-Atlantic.

== Activism ==
Martinez and Miller co-founded the #Right2Work dinner series, which brought together chefs, restaurateurs, lawyers, and public officials to discuss conditions for undocumented restaurant workers. At the 2022 James Beard Awards, Martinez said undocumented workers are "the backbone" of restaurant kitchens across the country.

During the COVID-19 pandemic, Martinez and Miller helped establish the People's Kitchen at El Compadre restaurant in the Italian Market, which provided free meals. The program served over 100,000 meals.

Since opening her first restaurant, Martinez has employed more than 300 people, mostly Latino immigrants from Mexico and Central America.
