= Blanca Estela Gómez Carmona =

Mexican politician

- Born: 16 May 1962 (age 64); Calimaya, Mexico State, Mexico
- Occupation: Deputy
- Political party: PRI

Blanca Estela Gómez Carmona (born 16 May 1962) is a Mexican politician affiliated with the Institutional Revolutionary Party (PRI).

She has been elected to the Chamber of Deputies on two occasions: in the 2003 mid-terms, for the State of Mexico's 9th district; and in the 2012 general election, for the state's 23rd district.
