= Lerma, State of Mexico =

Lerma
- Municipality
- Lerma
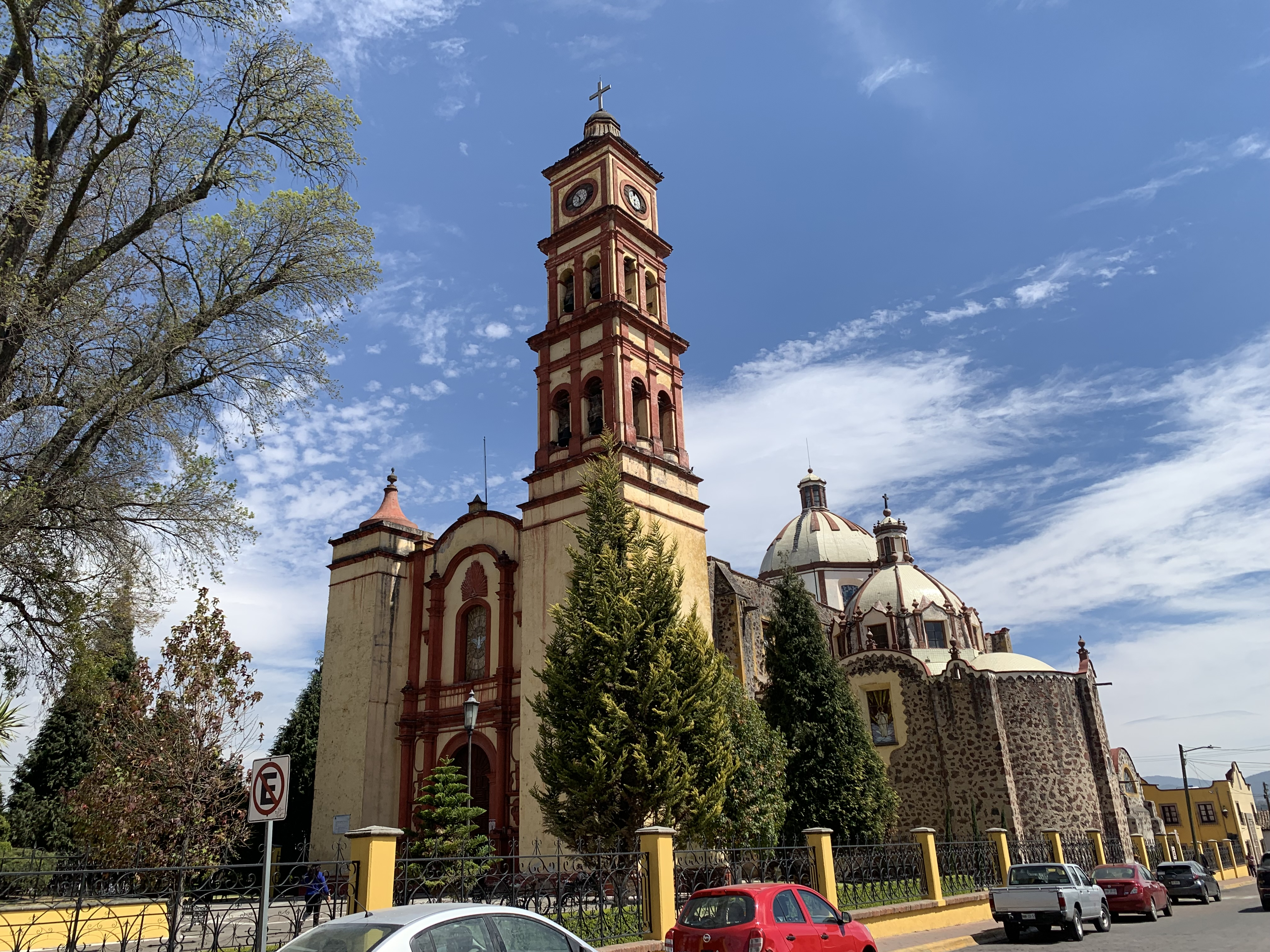
- Center of Lerma

- Coat of arms

- Location in Mexico
- Coordinates: 19°17′05″N 99°30′43″W
- Country: Mexico
- State: State of Mexico
- City Founded: 1616
- Municipality Founded: 1826

Government
  - Municipal President: Miguel Ángel Ramírez Ponce

Area
  - Municipality: 228.64 km^{2} (88.28 sq mi)
- Elevation of seat: 2,570 m (8,430 ft)

Population (2020)
  - Municipality: 170,327
  - Seat: 33,166
- Time zone: UTC-6 (Central)
- Postal code (of seat): 51350
- Area code: 728 y 722
- Website: (in Spanish) /Official site

Lerma is a municipality located just east of Toluca and 54 km west of Mexico City in State of Mexico, Mexico. The municipal seat city of Lerma de Villada was founded in the early colonial period and named after the Duke of Lerma in Spain. The municipal area saw two battles of the Mexican War of Independence, the Battle of Monte de las Cruces and the Battle of Lerma. For a time after independence, the city was the capital of Mexico State before it was moved to Toluca. The municipality is in one of the most densely populated areas of Mexico and is growing. Much of this growth is occurring near the Toluca-Mexico City highway and on the floodplains of the Lerma River. The latter has caused significant problems with flooding when the river overflows its banks during the rainy season.

The Nahuatl name for the area is Cacamilhuacan, which translates to "crows in the field." In the early colonial period, the area was called Santa Clara Cacamilhuacan. The municipality has both an Aztec glyph with a crow reflecting its Nahuatl name and a Spanish coat of arms.

San Pedro Tultepec was the first major settlement in the region, before the city of Lerma was built; today it is a small community within the municipality, along with Santiago Analco and San Miguel Ameyalco.

== History ==
The area was first inhabited by the Otomis, the Mazahuas and the Matlatzincas. Much of this area was marshland fed by the Lerma River. Some claim that the city was founded by the Matlatzincas before the Aztecs arrived, but this is disputed. The area was subdued in 1426 by the Aztec emperor Itzcoatl, when the main settlement was Huitzizilapan. After the Spanish Conquest, the area was divided into encomenderos with this area under the control of Isabel Moctezuma, with Martín Chimaltecatl, the indigenous leader of Ocoyocac having influence. At that time the major settlement here was San Pedro Tultepec as the city of Lerma did not exist. The city would be founded in 1616 as a village.

During the Mexican War of Independence, the most significant events to occur near here were the Battle of Monte de las Cruces in October 1810 and the Battle of Lerma in May 1812. The first was a pivotal battle in which Miguel Hidalgo y Costilla defeated royalist General Trujillo. The second was a battle for control of the city of Lerma.

The municipality of Lerma was created in 1826, soon after the erection of the State of Mexico. Just before the Reform War, Lerma became the sixth capital of Mexico State, until it was changed to Toluca in 1868. The municipality of San Mateo Atenco separated from Lerma in 1871, taking with it San Pedro Tultepec, This community returned to Lerma in 1874. The first railway line through here, connecting Toluca and Mexico City was built in the late 19th century.

During the Mexican Revolution, the city was mostly spared but outlying haciendas in the municipality such as Doña Rosa Santa Catarina and San Nicolas Peralta were attacked.

In 1936, the La Marquesa National Park was created, part of which is in the municipality of Lerma. In 1940, the construction of an aqueduct called "Alto Lerma" was begun to divert water to Mexico City. The first industries located here in 1960 in what is now known as Parque Industrial Lerma. This would accelerate the growth of the city and municipality.

During restructuring of the municipality's records between 1958 and 1960, it was found that several communities actually belonged to Ocoyocac and not Lerma. The communities of Peñon, La Escondida, El Portezuelo, La Marqueza and El Zarco were then administratively handed over.

In 2005, municipality residents along the highway blocked and closed it demanding that a pedestrian bridge be built in the area. The Lerma section of the Toluca-Mexico City highway had seen a large number of car/pedestrian accidents. Demonstrators stated that they had requested the bridge for years from authorities to no avail. A short time prior to the demonstration, two minors were struck by a vehicle and one died. The demonstration backed up traffic on the westbound lanes all the way onto Paseo Tollocan in Toluca.

A station is being constructed in Lerma along the Toluca–Mexico City commuter rail that will provide commuter rail service to Toluca and Mexico City. Service will commence in 2019.

== The city ==
The city center is located just north of the Toluca-Mexico City highway. In the center is the Parish of Santa Clara, which dates from 1693 with altarpieces from the 18th century. The Chapel of the Señor de la Caña contains an image of Christ which is locally venerated. The Temple of San Francisco dates from the 17th century. The feast of the Señor de la Caña is on 6 January and the feast for Santa Clara is on 12 August. The center has traditional markets called a tianguis, which on certain days swell to include vendors from the surrounding areas. Lerma is known for its production of cold cuts and sausages, especially chorizo. Lerma used to have a signature dish called frog soup, but this has mostly disappeared due to the loss of marshlands here. In markets and tianguis, one can find barbacoa, tacos, tamales and other traditional central Mexican dishes. However, one can occasionally find tamales with frogs' legs in the center.

In 2009, the Universidad Autonoma Metropolitana submitted plans to build a campus in Lerma on 23 hectares that were donated to the school by the federal government. The campus is projected to be opened in September 2010.

Prior to the colonial period, the Lerma River here was an interconnected series of lagoons and wetlands that covered much of the river valley. Drainage and other modifications have dried the marshes and left floodplains. Parts of the city and municipality of Lerma is prone to sudden and fierce flooding during the rainy season. These floods can affect thousands of people, prompting the need for rescue and at times displacing them for as much as a week. The floods spread the dirty and contaminated water of the river through homes and wild animals such as scorpions and snakes invade neighborhoods. This can prompt local declarations of disaster areas. The river has dikes and other water containment systems but they are insufficient, especially when garbage clogs drainage canals. The growing population of the municipality is pushing development onto what is left of the undeveloped floodplain, leading to more flooding problems.

The most evident growth of the city has taken place in the areas around the Toluca-Mexico City highway to the Toluca International Airport. This area has always been important, with two of the city's best known monuments, the Lerma Bridge, constructed between the 17th and 18th centuries and the old highway arch being in this area. The latter was built in 1942 on the old highway connecting Toluca and Mexico City and in a style called "national Neoclassical" (neoclasico nacionalista). It is located 200 meters from the Lerma Bridge. The municipality's main industrial park is located here and accounts for about 60% of the industry in the municipality. Businesses here produce processed foods, textiles, metals, automobiles and chemical products, by companies such as Avcomex, Diconsa, Bayer, Barcel and Unilever. About 340 businesses total are in the park. The park has over 60 hectares of subdivided land available for further expansion. Some of the enterprises located here include.

The highway has also attracted a number of commercial developments. The Las Plazas Outlet is one of the very few outlet malls in Mexico, located in the municipality on the Toluca- Mexico City highway. The mall contains over 150 stores selling a number of name brands at between 30 and 80% discount. Some of these customers are wholesalers who redistribute products in other parts of the country. The Plaza Sendero Toluca is one of the newest shopping malls in the municipality, opened in 2006. It is located in an area of the municipality experiencing growth due to its proximity to the Toluca airport and the Toluca-Mexico City highway. The mall was created by Grupo Acosta Verde with numerous stores and three hotels. Some of the businesses located here include Soriana, City Club, Cinepolis and about 150 others.

Attempts to build a north-south highway to serve the city have been problematic. A highway linking the city with the southern part of Mexico State and the state of Morelos has generated significant controversy since it was proposed. Critics state that the Lerma-Tres Marias Highway threatened forests in the southern part of Mexico State. These critics have included Greenpeace and the Centro Mexicano de Derecho Ambiental. The purpose of the highway is to provide a bypass for Mexico City for traffic to the west and south. However, critics state the highway passes through the Bosque de Agua forest, which is an important aquifer recharge area for the cities of Cuernavaca, Toluca and Mexico City.

== The municipality ==
As municipal seat, the city of Lerma is the local governing authority for over eighty other named communities, which together cover an area of 228.64 km^{2}. About sixteen percent of the municipality's population lives in the city proper. Many of the rest live in subdivisions called "fraccionamientos" that surround the city. Due to its mostly urban nature, less than 4% of the population speaks an indigenous language, mostly Nahuatl and Otomi. The municipality borders the municipalities of Jilotzingo, Xonacatlan, Capulhuac, Santiago Tianguistenco, Huixquilucan, Naucalpan de Juarez, Ocoyoacac, Metepec, San Mateo Atenco and Toluca.

The municipality's territory is irregular with rolling hills leading up to the Sierra de Las Cruces mountain range, which extend from north to south on the east side of the municipality. In this range, there are a number of steep valleys, such as Salazar. Most of the residents are found in the foothills of the Sierra. The western part used to be occupied by the Lerma Lake, a marsh connected with the Lerma River. This river is the main surface water source although there are some other streams and fresh-water springs. Most of the municipality's potable water is provided by 38 deep wells. The climate is temperate and fairly moist. The warmest months are May and June with most rains occurring from June to October. Average high temperatures are around 19C. Lows average about 7C but freezing temperatures in winter are not uncommon. The higher elevations are covered in forests of fir and pine. In the center of the municipality there are grass areas and willow, eucalyptus and other trees. Wildlife consists mostly of small mammals and reptiles. The soils and rocks here are volcanic in origin, with the west dominated by old lake and marshbeds.

About 41% of the municipality's territory is still dedicated to agriculture. Eighty percent of what is grown is corn and the rest divided among other crops. Livestock mostly consists of domestic fowl such as chickens and turkeys.

=== Smaller communities ===
Crafts are still practiced in a number of smaller communities in the municipality.

In San Pedro Tultepec, rattles, dolls and other toys are made. San Pedro Tultepec is known for the production of rustic and European style furniture as well as fireworks. It is one of the major producers of traditional Mexican rustic furniture in the Mexico City area. About 80% of the village's population of 15,000 is dedicated to furniture making. The community also has a Furniture Festival each year. The town is also known for its veneration of the Virgin of Candelaria which is celebrated every year on 2 February. The day is celebrated with traditional dance, fireworks, amusement rides and various religious activities. Food featured is mole rojo and rice. The town is surrounded by a number of lagoons, making fishing and duck hunting popular here. However, both these activities have been negatively affected by the dumping of garbage and other contaminants in the waterways.

San Migul Ameyalco specializes in embroidered items such as napkins and tablecloths with some fireworks made here as well. Elaborate adornments for church doors called "portadas" are made with agave, flowers and other plants in Huitzizilapan and Xochicuautla. Traditional clay comals are made in Santiago Analco, San Pedro Tultepec, and San Miguel Ameyalco.

== Economy ==
The Mexican division of Nissin Foods has its headquarters in Lerma.
