= Capulhuac =

- Municipality
- Coat of arms

- Location in Mexico
- Coordinates: 19°12′N 99°28′W
- Country: Mexico
- State: Mexico (state)

Area
  - Total: 21.5 km^{2} (8.3 sq mi)

Population (2005)
  - Total: 30,838
- Time zone: UTC-6 (Central Standard Time)

Capulhuac is one of 125 municipalities in the State of Mexico in Mexico. The municipal seat is Capulhuac de Mirafuentes. The municipality covers an area of 21.5 km^{2}.

Capulhuac is located in the central part of the state, in a highland area about 2,800 meters above sea level, and it borders municipalities such as Ocoyoacac and Tianguistenco.

As of 2005, the municipality had a total population of 30,838.

== Notable people ==
- Cristina Martinez, Mexican chef
