= Texcalyacac =

- Municipality
- Coat of arms

- Location in Mexico
- Coordinates: 19°09′15″N 99°28′55″W
- Country: Mexico
- State: Mexico (state)
- Municipal Seat: San Mateo Texcalyacac

Area
  - Total: 17.99 km^{2} (6.95 sq mi)

Population (2005)
  - Total: 4,514
- Time zone: UTC-6 (Central Standard Time)

Texcalyacac is a municipality in Mexico State in Mexico. The municipality covers an area of 17.99 km^{2}.

As of 2005, the municipality had a total population of 4,514.
