= Santa Cruz Atizapán =

Atizapán
- Municipality And City
- Atizapán
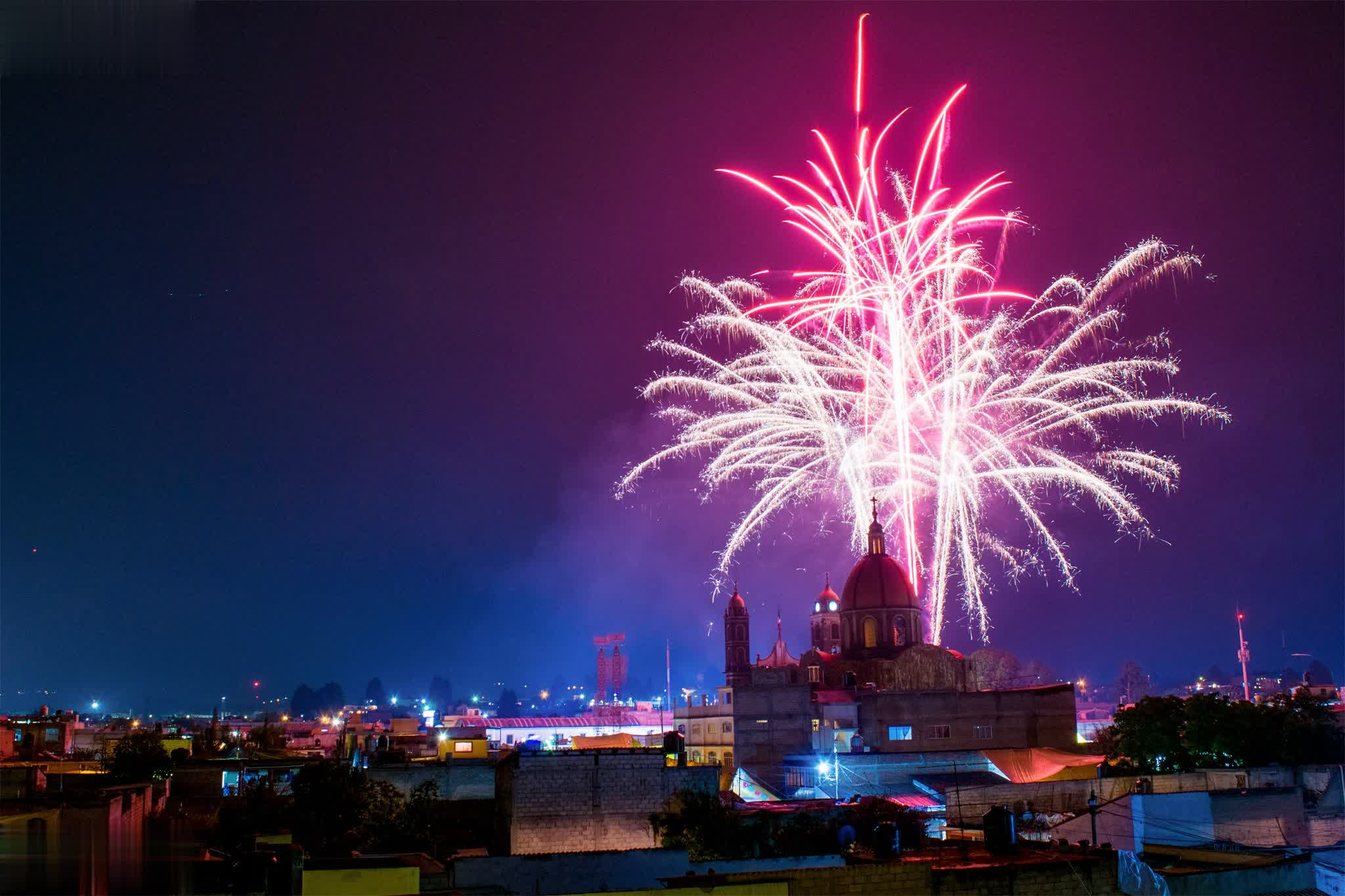
- Downtown Santa Cruz Atizapán At Night.

- Location in Mexico
- Coordinates: 19°10′32″N 99°29′19″W
- Country: Mexico
- State: Mexico (state)

Area
  - Total: 8.42 km^{2} (3.25 sq mi)

Population (2020)
  - Total: 12 984 - 16 800
- Time zone: UTC-6 (Central Standard Time)
- Postal code: 52500
- Area code: 713 / 722
- Website: bienescomunalesdeatizapansantacruz.com.mx/en.

Atizapán Santa Cruz is a city and municipality, in Mexico State in Mexico, Its name comes from Nahuatl: which translates as "en el agua blanca" or "en la tierra blanca" Translation To English: "in the white water" or "on the white land" The municipality covers an area of 8.42 km^{2}.

As of 2020, the city had a total population of 16,800.

== History ==
Atizapán in pre-Hispanic times was known as Tepozoco,"cerro boludo de piedra porosa", the archaeological remains attest to the presence of human settlements with an approximate age of 200,000 years.

The archaic Otomíes, Matlatzincas and Mazahuas were in the Toluca Valley since Teotihuacan and Toltec times, at least from The Matlatzincas, also called "the grandparents," settled and built the four pyramids of Tepozoco, in Atizapán.

They were dedicated to fishing, they exploited the tule to make mats and other supplies for their homes; They were expert farmers, they formed chinampas and cornfields, they grew corn, beans, vegetables and squash; They were skilled in the use of the bow and arrow.

Around the year 640, a group of these Matlatzincas settled on the banks and shores of Atizapán, "in the white water.”

In 1476 Axayácatl conquered the towns of the Toluca Valley, including Atizapán, which remained within the jurisdiction of Tlacupan or Tacuba and as a tributary of Cuahuacán or Culhuacán.

Axayacatl moved several Aztec families to Atizapán to assert their dominance and impose their culture and dominate the original groups of Matlatzincas or Otomíes, which is why it is called a town of Mexicans.

In the second half of July 1521, Hernán Cortés sent Gonzalo de Sandoval and several Otomi chiefs to conquer the towns of the Matlatzinco Valley. The towns of the valley were conquered, including Atizapán.

For conquering New Spain, the Spanish crown rewarded him by naming him Marquis of the Valley of Oaxaca, and granted him a large territory of 700 leagues around, which included the towns of the Toluca Valley (including Atizapán).

On November 19, 1528, Cortés himself appointed Juan Gutiérrez Altamirano as the first governor and corregidor of the State and Marquisate of Toluca with headquarters in Calimaya, granting him the lands of the Toluca valley, from Atizapán to Toluca, and from Atenco to the towns of Tenango.

Between the years 1530 and 1536, Atizapán was Commandery of the Gutiérrez Altamirano family, of Cristóbal Cisneros and Alonso de Ávila, temporarily recovered by Hernán Cortés, returning it again to the Altamirano family.

In 1542, Brother Andrés de Castro assigned the name of Santa Cruz Atizapán, and left the town as its patron saint the symbol of the Lorraine or Patriarchal Cross.

In 1552, Mr. Gutiérrez Altamirano, husband of Juana Cortés, cousin of the conqueror, built the enormous Atenco hacienda, which was the first cattle ranch in Latin America, which was within the territory of the municipality; produced fighting bulls.

In 1558 the mayorazgo was formed, the descendants of Juan Gutiérrez Altamirano were converted into counts, but it was not until December 6, 1616 that Felipe III, by royal mercy, granted Fernando Altamirano the title of Count of Santiago Calimaya.

In 1592, Santa Cruz Atizapán, despite being evangelized, was recognized by the Spanish Crown; It was the main chief of the town, Bartolomé Miguel, to whom Viceroy Luis de Velasco granted the primary titles of his town.

During the Colonial Era, there were major disputes with neighboring towns over the possession of the lands and waters of Santa Cruz Atizapán, especially with the counts of Santiago Calimaya.

In the document of March 1, 1767, Carlos III considers Teutenango as one of the best second-class mayors, including Santiago Tianguistenco as his Attaché, to which the town of Atizapán belonged.

A year later, these towns became part of the county seat of Toluca and the Municipality of Mexico.

On October 29, 1810, during the Mexican independence movement, Atizapán allowed Miguel Hidalgo's army to pass through the Atenco bridge, to facilitate their arrival at Las Cruces Mountain. As the army passed, many Atizapenses joined the army to fight during the glorious battle, which was the most important battle in the feat of our Independence where Hidalgo army emerged triumphant.

During the French Intervention, injustices were committed by the authorities against their subjects, the natives of the town of Atizapán; For minimal administrative offenses, severe penalties and heavy work were applied, such as paving the streets or paying onerous fines. These events gave rise to the Atizapenses taking the corresponding steps before the entity's congress so that Santa Cruz would be a municipality.

In those days, Mr. Benito Juárez was persecuted by the conservatives and, when he passed through the town of Atizapán, the local residents received him with joy. They told him about the aforementioned events, and he invited them to work for their town to achieve its erection as a municipality.

On October 18, 1870, Santa Cruz Atizapán was established as a municipality of the State of Mexico.

During the Mexican Revolution, the main headquarters of the Carrancistas who fought hard against the Zapatistas who marauded in the towns of the region were installed in Tenango del Valle.

Antonio Hernández Mejía, from Atizapan, joined the troops of General Emiliano Zapata and, along with other citizens of this town, prevented the federal army from penetrating the municipal seat and taking the town into its power.

After the revolutionary movement, tranquility returned to the towns and reconstruction, however, it is not known why Atizapán was not given land from the Atenco hacienda to form its ejido; To date, the lands continue to be considered communal, with the same regime implemented by the Aztecas.

=== Featured People ===
- Antonio Hernández Mejía: apparently he was born in 1860, in Santa Cruz Atizapán, and died in Mexico City during the 1930s, when he was approximately 70 years old. He joined the Zapatista movement, standing out in these ranks; He fiercely defended his people so that the federal army troops did not enter to commit the outrages to which they were accustomed when they found members of the opposing side. He faced many times people who tried to attack one of the citizens of his town, he was always considered "defender of Atizapán"; He was highly respected and esteemed by his countrymen.
- María Magdalena Monroy Rosel: originally from Santa Cruz Atizapán, she saw the light for the first time on July 22, 1912, and died on August 18, 1985, when she was 73 years old. He always had great admiration for rural people. He worked in the League of Agrarian Communities in the city of Toluca, and on multiple occasions carried out actions to benefit the peasants of the entity.
- Professor María Ruiz Zetina: Born on April 25, 1931. Outstanding moral leader who, with her support, always promoted education and social work (even among her people). Thanks to his selfless altruistic work and commitment to his community, work was carried out for the construction of the "General Lázaro Cárdenas" Kindergarten, which has been in existence for more than 50 years since its founding. He carried out training work for women's work.

== Economy ==
=== Main sectors, products and services ===
In 1991, the structure of the agricultural land had a surface of 279,119 hectares of which 231,685 were arable, 45,680 were natural pasture, rangeland or montada, 1,754 without vegetation, 1,330 ha of irrigation, 230,355 of rainfed land and an ejido. or community dedicated to agriculture. The production volume was 46.36 tons of forage oats, 0.002 tons of beans and 458.16 tons of corn. The livestock stock in heads was: 231 cattle, 255 pigs, 297 sheep, 32 goats, 168 horses, 1,479 poultry, 15 rabbits and 12 boxes of beehives.

In 1992, the gross domestic product was 91,038 million pesos.

=== Economically active population by sector ===
In 1990, the population over 12 years old was 3,626 inhabitants: 1,465 were employed, 60 unemployed, 2,029 economically inactive, 72 unspecified. Of these, 345 worked in the primary sector, 724 in the secondary sector, 339 in the tertiary sector and 57 did not specify. Regarding the work situation, of 1,465: 635 were employees or workers, 178 were day laborers or laborers, 484 were self-employed, 26 were employers or entrepreneurs, 64 worked without remuneration and 78 did not specify. One of the main economic activities in the area is sewing.

== Historical Monuments ==
The archaeological zone called “Sitio 110 La Campana Tepozoco” predominates, located within the private estate called Santa Clara, it is a mound that in its bowels preserves archaeological vestiges of incalculable historical value. It is built with adobe placed horizontally in layers, not staggered. In the northern part of the summit of the hill there is a building where some explorations were carried out that showed the basement of two circular pyramids dedicated to Ehecatl. The archaeological zone includes La Campana, the Santa Clara ranch, the Tepozoco, the Pantépetl and the Tepiololco hill and have been studied by doctors Yoko Sugiura Yamamoto and Mari Carmen Serra Puche.

Among the architectural monuments, the church of Santa Cruz Atizapán from the 19th century stands out, in neoclassical style and an imposing Lorraine or patriarchal Cross on the main pediment and another on the main altar.

The environment of most of the Atizapán hamlet is based on Mexican colonial art, with rustic constructions made of adobe and gabled clay tile roofs. Among the historical monuments: the busts of Hidalgo, Juárez, Emiliano Zapata and the arch and obelisk of José María Morelos y Pavón.

Of the religious architecture: the Pantépetl chapel built on March 17, 1879 and the Santo Niño chapel from 1863 and the paintings of the temples.
