= Xalatlaco =

- Municipality
- Location in Mexico
- Coordinates: 19°10′52″N 99°24′59″W
- Country: Mexico
- State: Mexico (state)
- Municipal Seat: Xalatlaco

Area
  - Municipality: 93.23 km^{2} (36.00 sq mi)
- Elevation at seat: 2,766 m (9,075 ft)

Population (2010)
  - Municipality: 26,865
  - Urban: 15,043
- Time zone: UTC-6 (Central Standard Time)

Xalatlaco is a municipality in Mexico State in Mexico. The municipality covers an area of 93.23 km^{2}. It is one of the 17 municipalities that border Mexico City, bordering the capital city's southwest side.

As of the 2010 census, the municipality had a total population of 26,865 inhabitants.

== Towns and villages ==
The largest localities (cities, towns, and villages) are:

| Name | 2010 Census Population |
|---|---|
| Xalatlaco | 15,043 |
| Mezapa la Fábrica | 1,762 |
| El Águila (La Mesa) | 1,413 |
| San Juan Tomasquillo Herradura | 1,315 |
| Techichili | 1,091 |
| Morelos (Colonia Morelos) | 1,041 |
| Cuixapa (Coexapa) | 980 |
| Cruz Larga | 946 |
| Total Municipality | 26,865 |
