= Area codes in Mexico by code (700–799) =

The 700–799 range of area codes in Mexico is reserved for the states of Guerrero, Mexico, Michoacán, Hidalgo, Morelos, Oaxaca, Puebla, Tlaxcala, and Veracruz. The country code of Mexico is 52.

For other areas, see Area codes in Mexico by code.

City	State	Code	Ref.
El Oro	Mexico State	711	
Santa Rosa de Lima	Mexico State	711	
Santiago Oxtempan	Mexico State	711	
Tlalpujahua	Michoacán	711	
Atlacomulco	Mexico State	712	
Chosto de los Jarros	Mexico State	712	
Ixtlahuaca	Mexico State	712	
Jiquipilco	Mexico State	712	
Jocotitlán	Mexico State	712	
San Andrés Timilpan	Mexico State	712	
San Bartolo Morelos	Mexico State	712	
San Felipe del Progreso	Mexico State	712	
San Francisco Cheje	Mexico State	712	
San Jerónimo Ixtapantongo	Mexico State	712	
San José del Rincón	Mexico State	712	
San Lorenzo Malacota	Mexico State	712	
San Lorenzo Toxico	EstMexico State	712	
San Miguel Tenochtitlán	Mexico State	712	
San Pedro los Baños	Mexico State	712	
San Sebastián Buenos Aires	Mexico State	712	
Santa Cruz Tepexpan	Mexico State	712	
Santiago Acutzilapan	Mexico State	712	
Santiago Yeche	Mexico State	712	
San Nicolás Tlazala	Mexico State	713	
Santa Cruz Atizapán	Mexico State	713	
Santiago Tianguistenco	Mexico State	713	
Xalatlaco	Mexico State	713	
Chalma	Mexico State	714	
Joquicingo de León Guzmán	Mexico State	714	
Malinalco	Mexico State	714	
Ocuilán de Arteaga	Mexico State	714	
San Juan Xochiaca	Mexico State	714	
San Miguel	Mexico State	714	
San Simón El Alto	Mexico State	714	
Santa María Aranza	Mexico State	714	
Santa Martha	Mexico State	714	
Santiago Oxtotitlán	Mexico State	714	
San Miguel Tecomatlan	Mexico State	714	
Tenancingo	Mexico State	714	
Villa Guerrero	Mexico State	714	
Zumpahuacán	Mexico State	714	
Angangueo	Michoacán	715	
Jungapeo	Michoacán	715	
Ocampo	Michoacán	715	
Zirahuato de Los Bernal	Michoacán	715	
Zitacuaro	Michoacán	715	
Almoloya de Alquisiras	Mexico State	716	
Amatepec	Mexico State	716	
El Cerro del Campo	Mexico State	716	
El Salitre Palmarillos	Mexico State	716	
Palmar Chico	Mexico State	716	
San Francisco de Asís	Mexico State	716	
San Pedro Limón	Mexico State	716	
San Simón de Guerrero	Mexico State	716	
San Simón	Mexico State	716	
Santa Ana Zicatecoyan	Mexico State	716	
Sultepec	Mexico State	716	
Temascaltepec	Mexico State	716	
Texcaltitlán	Mexico State	716	
Tlatlaya	Mexico State	716	
Atlatlahuca	Mexico State	717	
San Antonio la Isla	Mexico State	717	
San Miguel Balderas	Mexico State	717	
Santa María Jajalpa	Mexico State	717	
Tenango de Arista	Mexico State	717	
Acambay	Mexico State	718	
Aculco	Mexico State	718	
Ahuacatitlán Centro	Mexico State	718	
Arroyo Zarco	Mexico State	718	
San José Agostadero	Mexico State	718	
Ex-hacienda de Solís	Mexico State	718	
La Loma	Mexico State	718	
San Francisco Tepeolulco	Mexico State	718	
San Lucas Totolmaloya	Mexico State	718	
Santa Ana Matlabat	Mexico State	718	
Santa María Canchesda	Mexico State	718	
Santiago Coachochitlán	Mexico State	718	
Temascalcingo	Mexico State	718	
Tuxmadeje Grande (Santa María T)	Mexico State	718	
Jiquipilco El Viejo	Mexico State	719	
San Francisco Xonacatlán	Mexico State	719	
San Miguel Mimiapan	Mexico State	719	
Santa Ana Jilotzingo	Mexico State	719	
Santiago Tejocotillos (Tejocoti)	Mexico State	719	
Temoaya	Mexico State	719	
Villa Cuauhtémoc	Mexico State	719	
Ixtapan de la Sal	Mexico State	721	
La Puerta de santiago	Mexico State	721	
Tonatico	Mexico State	721	
Zacualpan	Mexico State	721	
Pilcaya	Guerrero	721	
Tetipac	Guerrero	721	
Calimaya de Díaz González	Mexico State	722 / 729	
Calixtlahuaca	Mexico State	722 / 729	
Capardillas (Rancho Santa Lugarda)	Mexico State	722 / 729	
Colonia Agrícola Alvaro Obregón	Mexico State	722 / 729	
El Cerrillo Piedras Blancas (El Cerrillo)	Mexico State	722 / 729	
Loma de San Luis Mextepec	Mexico State	722 / 729	
Metepec	Mexico State	722 / 729	
Mexicaltzingo	Mexico State	722 / 729	
San Andrés Cuexcontitlán	Mexico State	722 / 729	
San Juan de las Huertas	Mexico State	722 / 729	
San Juan Tilapa	Mexico State	722 / 729	
San Mateo Otzacatipan	Mexico State	722 / 729	
San Miguel Zinacantepec	Mexico State	722 / 729	
San Pablo Autopan	Mexico State	722 / 729	
San Pedro Totoltepec	Mexico State	722 / 729	
Tlachaloya	Mexico State	722 / 729	
Toluca	Mexico State	722 / 729	
Chiltepec de Hidalgo	Mexico State	723	
Coatepec Harinas	Mexico State	723	
Cochisquila	Mexico State	723	
Ixtlahuaca de Villada	Mexico State	723	
Almoloya de las Granadas	Mexico State	724	
Bejucos	Mexico State	724	
El Estanco	Mexico State	724	
Hermiltepec (Peña Blanca)	Mexico State	724	
Luvianos	Mexico State	724	
San Juan Acatitlán	Mexico State	724	
San Miguel Ixtapan	Mexico State	724	
Tejupilco de Hidalgo	Mexico State	724	
Almoloya de Juárez	Mexico State	725	
Cieneguillas	Mexico State	725	
Mina México	Mexico State	725	
San Francisco Tlalcilalcalpan	Mexico State	725	
Santa María del Monte	Mexico State	725	
Amanalco de Becerra	Mexico State	726	
Colonia Dr. Gustavo Baz	Mexico State	726	
Colorines	Mexico State	726	
Ixtapan del Oro	Mexico State	726	
Loma de Juárez	Mexico State	726	
Otzoloapan	Mexico State	726	
Santa María Pipioltepec	Mexico State	726	
Rancho Avándaro	Mexico State	726	
San Felipe Santiago	Mexico State	726	
San Gaspar	Mexico State	726	
San José Villa de Allende	Mexico State	726	
San Juan Atezcapan	Mexico State	726	
Tenantongo (Avándaro)	Mexico State	726	
Valle de Bravo	Mexico State	726	
Villa Victoria	Mexico State	726	
Zacazonapan	Mexico State	726	
Atenango del Río	Guerrero	727	
Buenavista de Cuéllar	Guerrero	727	
Chaucingo	Guerrero	727	
Copalillo	Guerrero	727	
Huitzuco	Guerrero	727	
Paso Morelos (Cuetlajuchi)	Guerrero	727	
Quetzalapa	Guerrero	727	
Tlaxmalac	Guerrero	727	
Tulimán	Guerrero	727	
Zacapalco	Guerrero	727	
La Unidad Huitzizilapan	Mexico State	728	
Lerma	Mexico State	728	
Ocoyoacac	Mexico State	728	
San Lorenzo Huitzizilapan	Mexico State	728	
San Mateo Atenco	Mexico State	728	
San Pedro Atlapulco	Mexico State	728	
Santa María Tlalmimilolpan	Mexico State	728	
Santa Mateo Atarasquillo	Mexico State	728	
Toluca	Mexico State	729	
Amayuca	Morelos	731	
Chalcatzingo	Morelos	731	
Huecahuasco	Morelos	731	
Huejotengo (San Marcos)	Morelos	731	
San Andrés Hueyapán	Morelos	731	
Jumiltepec	Morelos	731	
Ocuituco	Morelos	731	
Tecajec	Morelos	731	
Tetela del Volcán	Morelos	731	
Tlacotepec	Morelos	731	
Yecapixtla	Morelos	731	
Zacualpan	Morelos	731	
Acuchillán del Progreso	Guerrero	732	
Arcelia	Guerrero	732	
Arroyo Grande	Guerrero	732	
Changata	Guerrero	732	
Cutzamala de Pinzón	Guerrero	732	
El Escondido	Guerrero	732	
Nuevo Galeana	Guerrero	732	
Presa Palos Altos	Guerrero	732	
San José Poliutla	Guerrero	732	
San Miguel Totolapan	Guerrero	732	
Santa Ana del Aguila	Guerrero	732	
Tamácuaro	Guerrero	732	
Tlalchapa	Guerrero	732	
Tlapehuala	Guerrero	732	
Villa Hidalgo (El Cubo)	Guerrero	732	
Villa Nicolás Bravo	Guerrero	732	
Zacapuato	Guerrero	732	
Ahuehuepan	Guerrero	733	
Coacoyula de Alvarez	Guerrero	733	
El Crucero de Pololcingo	Guerrero	733	
El Naranjo	Guerrero	733	
Iguala	Guerrero	733	
Maxela	Guerrero	733	
Mayanalán	Guerrero	733	
Mezcala	Guerrero	733	
Sabana Grande	Guerrero	733	
San Juan Tetelcingo	Guerrero	733	
San Miguel Tecuixiapan	Guerrero	733	
San Vicente Palapa	Guerrero	733	
Santa Teresa	Guerrero	733	
Tepecoacuilco de Trujano	Guerrero	733	
Tonalapa del Sur	Guerrero	733	
Tuxpan	Guerrero	733	
Zacacoyuca	Guerrero	733	
Acamilpa	Morelos	734	
Ahuehuetzingo	Morelos	734	
Jojutla	Morelos	734	
Nexpa	Morelos	734	
Pedro Amaro	Morelos	734	
San José Vistahermosa	Morelos	734	
Santa Rosa Treinta	Morelos	734	
Tehuixtla	Morelos	734	
Tequesquitengo	Morelos	734	
Ticumán	Morelos	734	
Tlaltizapan	Morelos	734	
Tlaquiltenango	Morelos	734	
Tlatenchi	Morelos	734	
U. H. J. Ma. Morelos y Pavón	Morelos	734	
Xoxocotla	Morelos	734	
Zacatepec de Hidalgo	Morelos	734	
Atlatlahucán	Morelos	735	
Chinameca	Morelos	735	
Ciudad Ayala	Morelos	735	
Cocoyoc	Morelos	735	
Cuautla	Morelos	735	
Felipe Neri (Cuatepec)	Morelos	735	
Kunetzin de los Volcanes	Morelos	735	
Jonacatepec	Morelos	735	
Juan Morales	Morelos	735	
Lázaro Cárdenas (El Empalme)	Morelos	735	
Moyotepec	Morelos	735	
Oacalco	Morelos	735	
Oaxtepec	Morelos	735	
Parque Industrial Cuautla	Morelos	735	
San Isidro	Morelos	735	
San Vicente de Juárez (Las Piedras)	Morelos	735	
Tenextepango	Morelos	735	
Tlalnepantla	Morelos	735	
Tlayacapan	Morelos	735	
Tlayca	Morelos	735	
Tlayecac	Morelos	735	
Totolapan	Morelos	735	
Xaloxtoc	Morelos	735	
Yautepec	Morelos	735	
Acapetlahuaya	Guerrero	736	
Acatempan	Guerrero	736	
Apaxtla de Castrejón	Guerrero	736	
Apipilulco	Guerrero	736	
Chilacachapa	Guerrero	736	
Cocula	Guerrero	736	
Cuetzala del Progreso	Guerrero	736	
Ixcapuzalco	Guerrero	736	
Ixcateopan de Cuauhtémoc	Guerrero	736	
Los Sauces	Guerrero	736	
Nuevo Balsas	Guerrero	736	
Oxtotitlán	Guerrero	736	
San Martín Pachivia	Guerrero	736	
Teloloapan	Guerrero	736	
Tlacotepec	Guerrero	736	
Tonalapa del Río	Hidalgo	736	
Coatetelco	Morelos	737	
El Rodeo	Morelos	737	
Miacatlán	Morelos	737	
Palpan de Baranda	Morelos	737	
Xochicalco (Cirenio Longares)	Morelos	737	
Alfajayucan	Hidalgo	738	
Chilcuautla	Hidalgo	738	
Colonia Morelos	Hidalgo	738	
Dextho de Victoria	Hidalgo	738	
El Mejay	Hidalgo	738	
El Rosario	Hidalgo	738	
El Tothie	Hidalgo	738	
Huitexcalco de Morelos	Hidalgo	738	
Jaguey Blanco	Hidalgo	738	
Mixquiahuala	Hidalgo	738	
Progreso	Hidalgo	738	
San Salvador	Hidalgo	738	
Teñhe	Hidalgo	738	
Tepatepec	Hidalgo	738	
Xochitlán	Hidalgo	738	
Amatlán de Quetzalcoatl	Morelos	739	
Coajomulco	Morelos	739	
Huitzilac	Morelos	739	
San Juan Tlacotenco	Morelos	739	
Santa Catarina, Morelos	Morelos	739	
Tepoztlán	Morelos	739	
Acatepec	Guerrero	741	
Azoyú	Guerrero	741	
Cochoapa	Guerrero	741	
Comaltepec (Comal)	Guerrero	741	
Copala	Guerrero	741	
Cuajinicuilapa	Guerrero	741	
Cuanacastitlan	Guerrero	741	
El Pitahayo	Guerrero	741	
Huajintepec	Guerrero	741	
Huehuetán	Guerrero	741	
Huixtepec	Guerrero	741	
Igualapa	Guerrero	741	
Juchitán	Guerrero	741	
Maldonado	Guerrero	741	
Marquelia	Guerrero	741	
Ojo de Agua (Las Salinas)	Guerrero	741	
Ometepec	Guerrero	741	
Quetzalapa	Guerrero	741	
San Juan de los Lanos	Guerrero	741	
San Luis Acatlán	Guerrero	741	
San Nicolás	Guerrero	741	
Santa María Asunción	Guerrero	741	
Tlacoachistlahuaca	Guerrero	741	
Xochistlahuaca	Guerrero	741	
Yoloxochitl	Guerrero	741	
Santo Domingo Armenta	Oaxaca	741	
Atoyac de Álvarez	Guerrero	742	
Coyuquilla Norte	Guerrero	742	
El Ciruelar	Guerrero	742	
El Paraíso	Guerrero	742	
El Suchil	Guerrero	742	
Nuxco	Guerrero	742	
Papanoa	Guerrero	742	
San Luis de la Loma	Guerrero	742	
Tecpán de Galeana	Guerrero	742	
Tenexpa	Guerrero	742	
Tetitlán	Guerrero	742	
Zacualpan	Guerrero	742	
Santa María Aticpac	Mexico State	743	
Acayuca	Hidalgo	743	
General Felipe Angeles	Hidalgo	743	
Jagüey de Téllez (Estación Téllez)	Hidalgo	743	
San Agustín Tlaxiaca	Hidalgo	743	
San Agustín Zapotlán	Hidalgo	743	
San Juan Solís	Hidalgo	743	
San Pedro Tlaquilpan	Hidalgo	743	
Santiago Tepeyahualco	Hidalgo	743	
Santo Tomás	Hidalgo	743	
Tolcayuca	Hidalgo	743	
Villa Tezontepec	Hidalgo	743	
Zapotlán de Juárez	Hidalgo	743	
Zempoala	Hidalgo	743	
Acapulco	Guerrero	744	
Amatillo	Guerrero	744	
Barra Vieja	Guerrero	744	
Dos Arroyos	Guerrero	744	
Ejido Nuevo	Guerrero	744	
Kilometro 21	Guerrero	744	
Kilometro 30	Guerrero	744	
La Providencia	Guerrero	744	
Los Mogotes	Guerrero	744	
Luces del Mar	Guerrero	744	
San Pedro las Playas	Guerrero	744	
Texca	Guerrero	744	
Xaltianguis	Guerrero	744	
Ayutla de los Libres	Guerrero	745	
Colotepec	Guerrero	745	
Cruz Grande	Guerrero	745	
Cruz Quemada	Guerrero	745	
El Ocotito	Guerrero	745	
La Azozuca	Guerrero	745	
Las Cruces	Guerrero	745	
Las Mesas	Guerrero	745	
Las Vigas	Guerrero	745	
Llano Grande	Guerrero	745	
San Juan del Reparo (San Juan D)	Guerrero	745	
San Marcos	Guerrero	745	
Tecoanapa	Guerrero	745	
Tierra Colorada	Guerrero	745	
Cuautepec	Hidalgo	745	
Jalapa	Hidalgo	745	
Tonalá	Hidalgo	745	
Huautla	Hidalgo	746	
Mecapalapa	Puebla	746	
Metlaltoyuca	Puebla	746	
Pantepec	Puebla	746	
Venustiano Carranza	Puebla	746	
Villa Lázaro Cárdenas (La Uno)	Puebla	746	
Benito Juárez	Veracruz	746	
Castillo de Teayo	Veracruz	746	
Chicontepec	Veracruz	746	
Colatlan	Veracruz	746	
El Palmar (Mpio. Tihuatlán)	Veracruz	746	
Enrique Rodríguez Cano (Zapotal)	Veracruz	746	
Ixhuatlán de Madero	Veracruz	746	
La Concepción	Veracruz	746	
La Guadalupe	Veracruz	746	
Llano Enmedio	Veracruz	746	
Tihuatlán	Veracruz	746	
Tlacolula	Veracruz	746	
Zacate Colorado	Veracruz	746	
Chichihualco	Guerrero	747	
Chilpancingo	Guerrero	747	
El Palmar	Guerrero	747	
Las Petaquillas	Guerrero	747	
Mazatlán	Guerrero	747	
Palo Blanco	Guerrero	747	
Xochipala	Guerrero	747	
Zumpango del Río	Guerrero	747	
Almoloya	Hidalgo	748	
Apan	Hidalgo	748	
Chimalpa y Tlalayote	Hidalgo	748	
Emiliano Zapata	Hidalgo	748	
José María Morelos (San José)	Hidalgo	748	
Lazaro Cárdenas	Hidalgo	748	
Benito Juárez	Tlaxcala	748	
Nanacamilpa	Tlaxcala	748	
Sanctorum Lázaro Cárdenas	Tlaxcala	748	
Calpulalpan	Tlaxcala	749	
Santiago Cuaula	Tlaxcala	749	
Amacuzac	Morelos	751	
Coahuixtla	Morelos	751	
Coatlán del Río	Morelos	751	
Cuahuchichinola	Morelos	751	
Huajintlán	Morelos	751	
Michapa	Morelos	751	
Puente de Ixtla	Morelos	751	
San Gabriel Las Palmas	Morelos	751	
Tetecala	Morelos	751	
Tilzapotla	Morelos	751	
Petacalco	Guerrero	753	
Acalpican de Morelos	Michoacán	753	
Arteaga	Michoacán	753	
Bahía Bufadero	Michoacán	753	
Buenos Aires	Michoacán	753	
Ciudad Lázaro Cárdenas	Michoacán	753	
Morelos de Infiernillo	Michoacán	753	
La Mira y Guacamayas	Michoacán	753	
Las Guacamayas	Michoacán	753	
Playa Azul	Michoacán	753	
Apango	Guerrero	754	
Atliaca	Guerrero	754	
Mochitlán	Guerrero	754	
Tixtla	Guerrero	754	
Coacoyul	Guerrero	755	
Ixtapa Zihuatanejo	Guerrero	755	
La Unión	Guerrero	755	
Lagunillas	Guerrero	755	
Los Achotes	Guerrero	755	
Troncones (Emiliano Zapata)	Guerrero	755	
Zihuatanejo	Guerrero	755	
Ahuacuotzingo	Guerrero	756	
Atlixtac	Guerrero	756	
Chilapa	Guerrero	756	
Colotlipa	Guerrero	756	
Olinalá	Guerrero	756	
Pochahuizco	Guerrero	756	
Quechultenango	Guerrero	756	
Temalacatzingo	Guerrero	756	
Zitlala	Guerrero	756	
Alcozauca de Guerrero	Guerrero	757	
Alpoyeca	Guerrero	757	
Copanatoyac	Guerrero	757	
Cualac	Guerrero	757	
Huamuxtitlán	Guerrero	757	
San José Buenavista	Guerrero	757	
Santa Cruz	Guerrero	757	
Tlalixtaquilla	Guerrero	757	
Tlalquetzala	Guerrero	757	
Tlapa de Comonfort	Guerrero	757	
Xochihuehuetlan	Guerrero	757	
Zacatipa	Guerrero	757	
Zapotitlán Lagunas	Oaxaca	757	
Coyuquilla Sur	Guerrero	758	
Petatlán	Guerrero	758	
San Jeronimito (San Jerónimo)	Guerrero	758	
Caltimacán	Hidalgo	759	
Cardonal	Hidalgo	759	
El Alberto	Hidalgo	759	
El Deca	Hidalgo	759	
El Tephe	Hidalgo	759	
Ixmiquilpan	Hidalgo	759	
La Loma Julián Villagrán	Hidalgo	759	
Lázaro Cárdenas (Remedios)	Hidalgo	759	
Los Remedios	Hidalgo	759	
Orizabita	Hidalgo	759	
San Antonio Sabanillas	Hidalgo	759	
Santuario Mapethe	Hidalgo	759	
Tasquillo	Hidalgo	759	
Taxadho	Hidalgo	759	
Zimapán	Hidalgo	759	
Calpulalpan	Mexico State	761	
Canalejas	Mexico State	761	
Jilotepec	Mexico State	761	
San Francisco Soyaniquilpan	Mexico State	761	
El Jaguey	Hidalgo	761	
El Saucillo	Hidalgo	761	
Gandho	Hidalgo	761	
Huichapan	Hidalgo	761	
Llano Largo	Hidalgo	761	
Maravillas	Hidalgo	761	
Nopala	Hidalgo	761	
San Sebastián Tenochtitlán	Hidalgo	761	
Tecozautla	Hidalgo	761	
Zothe	Hidalgo	761	
Bella Vista del Río	Querétaro	761	
Acamixtla	Guerrero	762	
El Fraile	Guerrero	762	
Huixtac	Guerrero	762	
Paintla	Guerrero	762	
Taxco El Viejo	Guerrero	762	
Taxco	Guerrero	762	
Tlamacazapa	Guerrero	762	
Chapantongo	Hidalgo	763	
La Cruz	Hidalgo	763	
Munitepec de Madero	Hidalgo	763	
Santa María Amealco	Hidalgo	763	
Sayula Pueblo	Hidalgo	763	
Tezontepec de Aldama	Hidalgo	763	
Tlahuelilpan	Hidalgo	763	
Ahuacatlan	Puebla	764	
Necaxa	Puebla	764	
Tepango de Rodríguez	Puebla	764	
Villa Avila Camacho (La Ceiba)	Puebla	764	
Xicotepec de Juárez	Puebla	764	
Alamo Temapache	Veracruz	765	
La Camelia (Palo Blanco)	Veracruz	765	
Potrero del Llano	Veracruz	765	
Temapache (H. Temapache de G. Z)	Veracruz	765	
Gutiérrez Zamora	Veracruz	766	
Lomas de Arena	Veracruz	766	
Tecolutla	Veracruz	766	
San Antonio del Rosario	Mexico State	767	
Amuco de la Reforma	Guerrero	767	
Anonas	Guerrero	767	
Aratichanguio	Guerrero	767	
Ciudad Altamirano	Guerrero	767	
Coyuca de Catalán	Guerrero	767	
Guayameo	Guerrero	767	
Paso de Arena	Guerrero	767	
Placeres del Oro	Guerrero	767	
Tanganhuato	Guerrero	767	
Zirándaro	Guerrero	767	
Amatlán	Veracruz	768	
Naranjos	Veracruz	768	
Saladero	Veracruz	768	
Tamalín	Veracruz	768	
Tamiahua	Veracruz	768	
Axochiapan	Morelos	769	
Huitchila	Morelos	769	
Ixtlilco El Grande	Morelos	769	
Marcelino Rodríguez (San Ignacio)	Morelos	769	
Quebrantadero (San José)	Morelos	769	
Telixtac	Morelos	769	
Tepalcingo	Morelos	769	
El Venado	Hidalgo	771	
Epazoyucan	Hidalgo	771	
Fraccionamiento La Reforma	Hidalgo	771	
Huasca de Ocampo	Hidalgo	771	
La Estanzuela	Hidalgo	771	
La Providencia	Hidalgo	771	
Mineral del Monte	Hidalgo	771	
Omitlán de Juárez	Hidalgo	771	
Pachuca de Soto	Hidalgo	771	
San Juan Tilcuautla	Hidalgo	771	
San Juan Tizahuapan	Hidalgo	771	
Santa Maria la Calera	Hidalgo	771	
Santa Matilde	Hidalgo	771	
Santa Mónica	Hidalgo	771	
Santiago Tlapacoya	Hidalgo	771	
Xochihuacan (Las Palomas)	Hidalgo	771	
Actopan	Hidalgo	772	
Caxuxi	Hidalgo	772	
Chicavasco	Hidalgo	772	
Dajiedhi	Hidalgo	772	
El Arenal	Hidalgo	772	
El Mezquital	Hidalgo	772	
La Estancia	Hidalgo	772	
Santiago de Anaya	Hidalgo	772	
Yolotepec	Hidalgo	772	
Bomintzha	Hidalgo	773	
Cruz Azul San Miguel Vindho	Hidalgo	773	
General Pedro María Anaya (San Mateo)	Hidalgo	773	
Melchor Ocampo (El Salto)	Hidalgo	773	
San Buenaventura	Hidalgo	773	
Santa Ana Ahuehuepan	Hidalgo	773	
Santiago Tlautla	Hidalgo	773	
Tepeji de Ocampo	Hidalgo	773	
Tinajas	Hidalgo	773	
Tula	Hidalgo	773	
Xiteje de Zapata	Hidalgo	773	
Agua Blanca Iturbide	Hidalgo	774	
Atotonilco El Grande	Hidalgo	774	
Calnali	Hidalgo	774	
Cerro Colorado	Hidalgo	774	
Ejido Alcholoya	Hidalgo	774	
El Contadero	Hidalgo	774	
Estación de Apulco	Hidalgo	774	
Metepec	Hidalgo	774	
Metztitlán	Hidalgo	774	
Mezquititlán	Hidalgo	774	
Molango	Hidalgo	774	
San Bartolo Tutotepec	Hidalgo	774	
San Martín	Hidalgo	774	
Tenango	Hidalgo	774	
Tepehuacán de Guerrero	Hidalgo	774	
Tianguistengo	Hidalgo	774	
San Francisco Tlahuelompa	Hidalgo	774	
Tlanchinol	Hidalgo	774	
Xochicoatlán	Hidalgo	774	
Zacualtipán	Hidalgo	774	
Huayacocotla	Veracruz	774	
Acatlán	Hidalgo	775	
Colonia 28 de Mayo (Santa Rosa)	Hidalgo	775	
Cuautepec de Hinojosa	Hidalgo	775	
El Pedregal San José	Hidalgo	775	
Jaltepec	Hidalgo	775	
La Lagunilla	Hidalgo	775	
Napateco	Hidalgo	775	
San Juan Hueyapan	Hidalgo	775	
San Lorenzo Sayula	Hidalgo	775	
Santa Ana de Allende	Hidalgo	775	
Santa Ana Hueytlalpan	Hidalgo	775	
Santa Elena Paliseca	Hidalgo	775	
Santiago Tulantepec	Hidalgo	775	
Singuilucan	Hidalgo	775	
Tulancingo	Hidalgo	775	
Acaxochitlán	Hidalgo	776	
San Pedro Tlachichilco	Hidalgo	776	
Santa Ana Tzacuala	Hidalgo	776	
Tenango de Doria	Hidalgo	776	
Ahuazotepec	Puebla	776	
Honey	Puebla	776	
Huauchinango	Puebla	776	
Pahuatlán de Valle	Puebla	776	
San Pablito	Puebla	776	
Venta Grande	Puebla	776	
Cuentepec	Morelos	777	
Cuernavaca	Morelos	777	
Emiliano Zapata	Morelos	777	
Jiutepec	Morelos	777	
La Joya	Morelos	777	
Monte Casino (Piamonte y Ensueñ)	Morelos	777	
San Agustín Tetlama	Morelos	777	
Santa Fe	Morelos	777	
Temixco	Morelos	777	
Tetecalita	Morelos	777	
Xochitepec	Morelos	777	
Ajacuba	Hidalgo	778	
Atitalaquía	Hidalgo	778	
Atotonilco de Tula	Hidalgo	778	
San Nicólas Tecomatlán	Hidalgo	778	
Santiago Tezontlale	Hidalgo	778	
Tlaxcoapan	Hidalgo	778	
Las Plazas	Hidalgo	779	
Tizayuca	Hidalgo	779	
Bajos del Ejido	Guerrero	781	
Coyuca de Benítez	Guerrero	781	
El Espinalillo	Guerrero	781	
El Papayo	Guerrero	781	
Hacienda de Cabañas	Guerrero	781	
San Jerónimo de Juárez	Guerrero	781	
Tepetixtla	Guerrero	781	
Tixtlancingo	Guerrero	781	
Coatzintla	Veracruz	782	
Nuevo Progreso (El Doce)	Veracruz	782	
Palma Sola	Veracruz	782	
Poza Rica	Veracruz	782	
Praxedis Guerrero (Kilometro Di)	Veracruz	783	
Santiago de la Peña	Veracruz	783	
Tuxpan	Veracruz	783	
Adolfo Ruiz Cortines	Veracruz	784	
Agua Dulce Papantla	Veracruz	784	
Barra de Cazones	Veracruz	784	
Carrizal	Veracruz	784	
Cazones de Herrera	Veracruz	784	
Comalteco	Veracruz	784	
Coxquihui	Veracruz	784	
Coyutla	Veracruz	784	
El Chote	Veracruz	784	
El Volador	Veracruz	784	
Entabladero	Veracruz	784	
La Unión	Veracruz	784	
Mecatlan	Veracruz	784	
Melchor Ocampo	Veracruz	784	
Miguel Aemán Valdés	Veracruz	784	
Papantla	Veracruz	784	
Progreso de Zaragoza	Veracruz	784	
Pueblillo	Veracruz	784	
Zozocolco de Hidalgo	Veracruz	784	
Cerro Azul	Veracruz	785	
Chontla	Veracruz	785	
Citlaltepec	Veracruz	785	
Ixcatepec	Veracruz	785	
Tancoco	Veracruz	785	
Tepetzintla	Veracruz	785	
Zacamixtle	Veracruz	785	
Agostitlán	Michoacán	786	
Aporo	Michoacán	786	
Benito Juárez	Michoacán	786	
Ciudad Hidalgo	Michoacán	786	
Huajumbaro	Michoacán	786	
Irimbo	Michoacán	786	
Las Grutas	Michoacán	786	
Melchor Ocampo (Paso de Tierra)	Michoacán	786	
Parícuaro	Michoacán	786	
Puente de Tierra	Michoacán	786	
Rincón de San Jeronimo	Michoacán	786	
San Andrés La Venta	Michoacán	786	
San Antonio Villalongín	Michoacán	786	
San Bartolo Cuitareo (Cuitareo)	Michoacán	786	
San Lucas Huarirapeo	Michoacán	786	
San Matías Grande	Michoacán	786	
San Pedro Jácuaro (Las Joyas)	Michoacán	786	
Senguio	Michoacán	786	
Susupuato de Guerrero	Michoacán	786	
Tupataro	Michoacán	786	
Tuxpan	Michoacán	786	
Tuzantla	Michoacán	786	
Tzintzingareo	Michoacán	786	
Atlapexco	Hidalgo	789	
Huejutla de Reyes	Hidalgo	789	
Jaltocan	Hidalgo	789	
La Capilla	Hidalgo	789	
Tehuetlán	Hidalgo	789	
Chalma	Veracruz	789	
Chapopote Chico (Tlachinolapa)	Veracruz	789	
Corozal	Veracruz	789	
Platón Sánchez	Veracruz	789	
Tantoyuca	Veracruz	789	
Tempoal de Sánchez	Veracruz	789	
Ciudad Sahagún	Hidalgo	791	
Colonia 20 de Noviembre	Hidalgo	791	
Los Cides	Hidalgo	791	
Tepeapulco	Hidalgo	791	
Aquixtla	Puebla	797	
Chignahuapan	Puebla	797	
Loma Alta	Puebla	797	
Tetela de Ocampo	Puebla	797	
Tomatlán	Puebla	797	
Tonalapa	Puebla	797	
Zacatlán	Puebla	797	
