= Zapotitlán Lagunas =

- Municipality and Town
- Location of the municipality in Oaxaca

- Location in Mexico
- Coordinates: 17°46′N 98°24′W
- Country: Mexico
- State: Oaxaca

Area
  - Total: 306.418 km^{2} (118.309 sq mi)

Population (2010)
  - Total: 3,133
- Time zone: UTC-6 (Central Standard Time)
- Postal code: 20567

Zapotitlán Lagunas is a town and one municipality out of 570 that make up the state of Oaxaca in south-western Mexico. The municipality covers an area of 306.418 km^{2}. It is part of the Silacayoapam District in the Mixteca Region.

As of 2010, the municipality had a total population of 3,133.

== Geography ==
Zapotitlán Lagunas is located at the northwest corner of the state of Oaxaca, its geographic coordinates are 17 ° 40 '- 17 ° 54' north latitude and 98 ° 18 '- 98 ° 30' west longitude and its altitude goes from 1,100 to 2,000 meters above sea level. The total land area of the state is 306,416 km² and represents 0.32% of Oaxaca's land area.

It borders to the northeast with the municipality of San Juan Cieneguilla, to the east with the municipality of San Juan Ihualtepec and to the south with the municipality of San Miguel Ahuehuetitlán, the municipality of San Andrés Tepetlapa and municipality of San Mateo Nejápam. To the north it borders the state of Puebla, in particular with the municipality of Tulcingo and to the west with the state of Guerrero, with the municipality of Xochihuehuetlán, the municipality of Huamuxtitlán and municipality of Alpoyeca.

== Demography ==
The total population of the municipality of Zapotitlán Lagunas according to the Population and Housing Census conducted in 2010 by the National Institute of Statistics and Geography, is 3,133 inhabitants, of which 1,436 are men and 1,697 are women.

The population density amounts to a total of 10.22 people per square kilometer.

=== Towns ===
The municipality is made up of 15 towns, its population according to the 2010 Census are:

Town	Population
Total Municipality	3,133
Zapotitlán Lagunas	1,477
Guadalupe del Recreo	608
Santa Cruz Vista Hermosa	313
San Pedro Cuaxoxocatla	193
San José el Huamúchil	154
Tlacotepec Lagoons	110
