= Sofío Ramírez Hernández =

Mexican politician

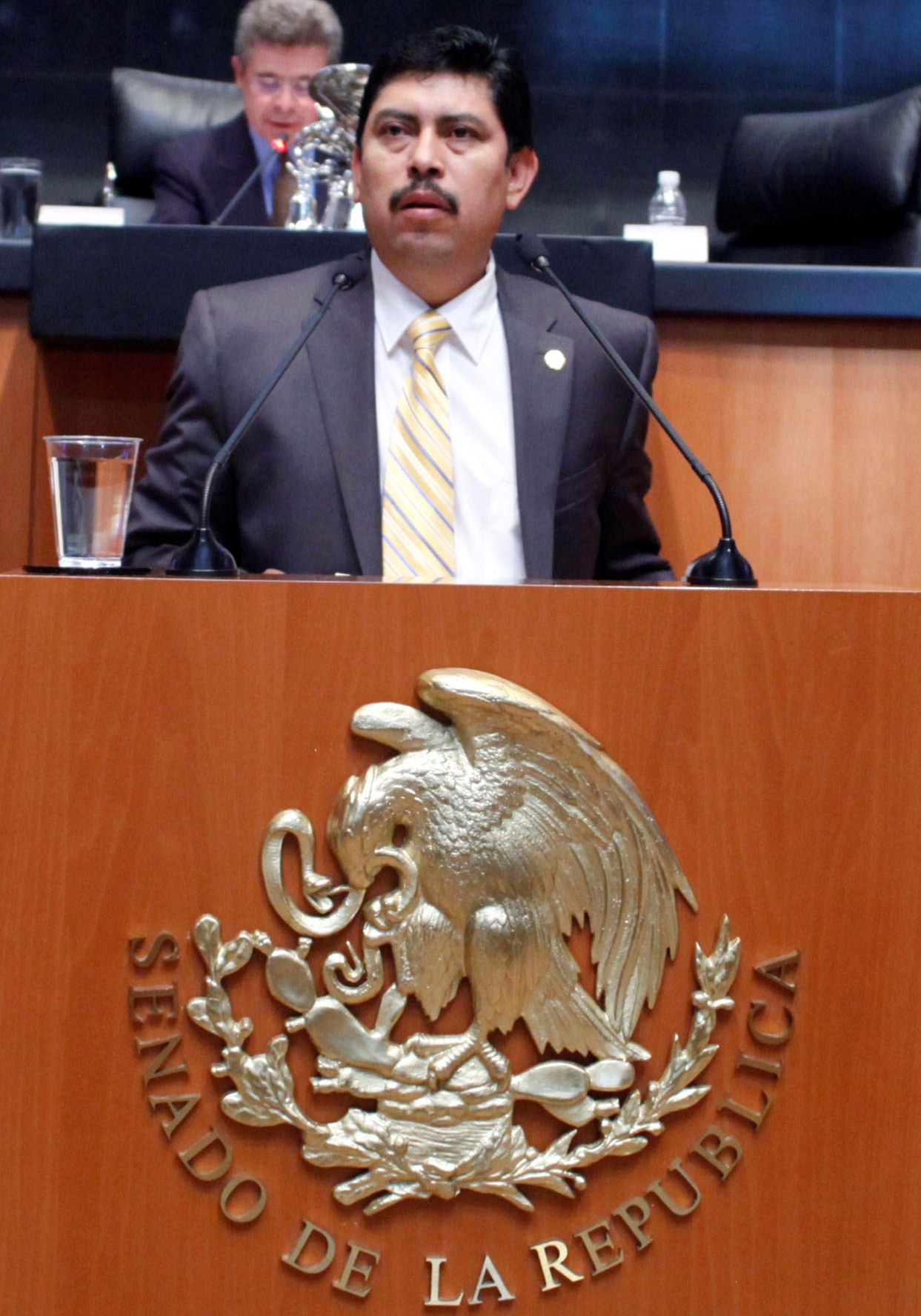
- Ramírez Hernández in 2012.
- Born: 27 June 1967 (age 58); Tlalixtaquilla, Guerrero, Mexico
- Education: Autonomous University of Guerrero
- Occupation: Politician
- Political party: PRDPRI

Socorro Sofío Ramírez Hernández (born 27 June 1967) is a Mexican politician. Born in Tlalixtaquilla, Guerrero, he has at different times been affiliated with both the Institutional Revolutionary Party (PRI) and the Party of the Democratic Revolution (PRD).

In 2002–2005 he held the municipal presidency of Tlalixtaquilla, Guerrero, and in 2005 he was elected to the Congress of Guerrero for a three-year term, representing Huamuxtitlán for the PRI.

In the 2009 mid-terms he was elected to the Chamber of Deputies to represent the fifth district of Guerrero for the PRI, but he resigned from the party and switched allegiance to the PRD in February 2011. He resigned his seat on 24 March 2011 to take office as Secretary of Rural Development under newly elected governor of Guerrero Ángel Aguirre Rivero and was replaced by his substitute, Moisés Villanueva de la Luz. When Villanueva de la Luz, was found murdered in Huamuxtitlán, Guerrero, in September 2011, various members of the PRI accused Ramírez Hernández of involvement. On 13 December 2011 he reassumed his seat in Congress.

In the 2012 general election he was elected to the Senate, representing Guerrero for the PRD. On 14 December 2015 he left the PRD and, on 4 February 2016, joined the PRI's parliamentary group.

In 2018, while he was still in the Senate, a group of female PRI members in Chihuahua lodged a complaint with the party accusing Ramírez Hernández of sexual harassment; he vehemently denied the allegations.
