= Canalejas =

Canalejas is a Spanish surname. Notable people with the name include:

- José Canalejas (actor) (1925–2015), Spanish actor
- Lina Canalejas (1932–2012), Spanish actress
- José Canalejas y Casas (1827–1902), Spanish engineer, writer and politician
- José Canalejas y Méndez (1854–1912), Prime Minister of Spain from 1910; assassinated in 1912

== See also ==
- Canalejas del Arroyo, municipality in Cuenca, Castile-La Mancha, Spain
- Canalejas, León, in the municipality of Almanza, in León province, Castile and León, Spain
- Canalejas de Peñafiel, municipality located in the province of Valladolid, Castile and León, Spain
