= Penafiel (disambiguation) =

Penafiel is a town and municipality in northern Portugal. It may also refer to:

- the former Roman Catholic Diocese of Penafiel, with see and former cathedral in that town, now a Latin titular see
- Penafiel (parish), a civil parish in Penafiel Municipality, Portugal
- F.C. Penafiel, a football club based in the city of Penafiel, Portugal

== See also ==
- Peñafiel (disambiguation) (Spanish)
