= Tepetlapa =

Tepetlapa may refer to:

- Santiago Tepetlapa, Oaxaca
- San Andrés Tepetlapa, Oaxaca
- San Antonio Tepetlapa, Oaxaca
- Tepetlapa Mixtec language
