= Santa Cruz de Bravo =

- Municipality and town
- Location in Mexico
- Coordinates: 17°34′54″N 98°13′23″W
- Country: Mexico
- State: Oaxaca

Area
  - Total: 112.27 km^{2} (43.35 sq mi)

Population (2005)
  - Total: 379
- Time zone: UTC-6 (Central Standard Time)

Santa Cruz de Bravo is a town and municipality in Oaxaca in south-western Mexico. The municipality covers an area of 112.27 km^{2} at an average height of 1,640 meters above sea level. It is part of the Silacayoapam District in the Mixteca Region.

As of 2005 the municipality had 86 households with a total population of 379, of whom 12 spoke indigenous languages.

The main town, originally Rancho Santa Cruz, is named after Leonardo Bravo, father of 19th century interim Mexican president Nicolás Bravo.

== Geography ==
It is located on the main road from Silacayoapam to Mariscala de Juárez. The climate is temperate. 90% of the population are engaged in agriculture, mainly growing corn and beans, with some raising livestock in their back yards.
