= Peñafiel =

Peñafiel may refer to:

- Peñafiel, Spain
- Peñafiel Castle, Spain
- Peñafiel (mineral water), a Mexican mineral water brand

== People ==
- Constance of Peñafiel
- Juan Manuel, Duke of Peñafiel

== See also ==
- Torre de Peñafiel
- Canalejas de Peñafiel
- Olmos de Peñafiel
