= Calaveras de Abajo =

- Locality
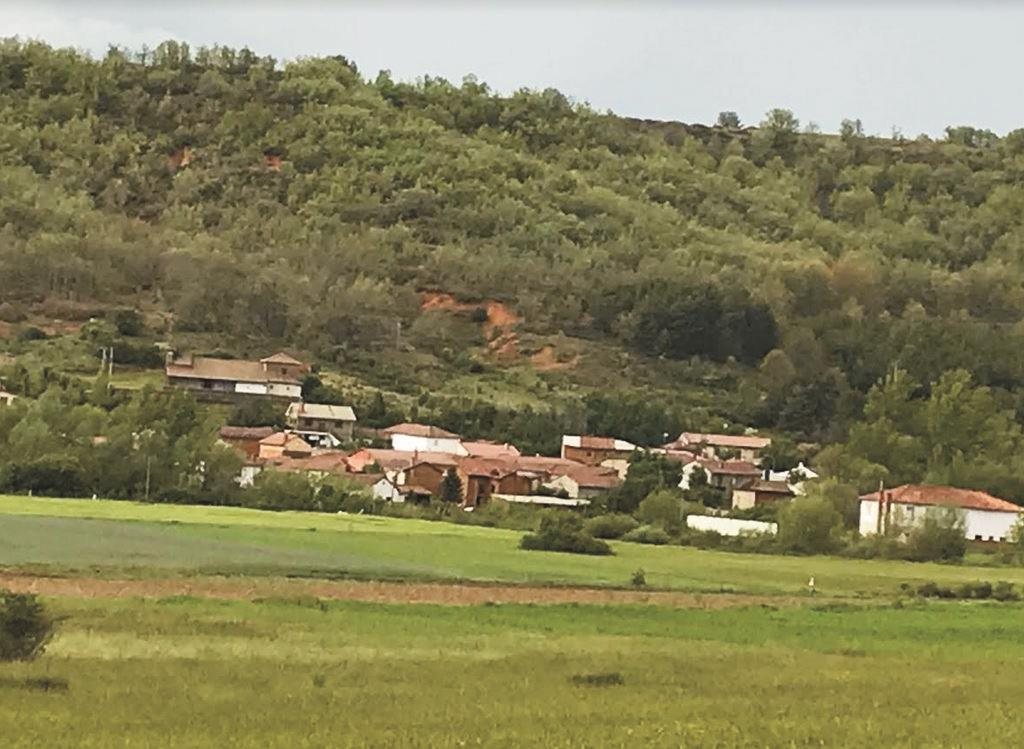

- Location within Province of León Location within Castile and León Location within Spain
- Coordinates: 42°41′27″N 4°59′6″W
- Country: Spain
- Autonomous community: Castile and León
- Province: Province of León
- Municipality: Almanza
- Elevation: 949 m (3,114 ft)

Population
  - Total: 20

Calaveras de Abajo is a locality located in the municipality of Almanza, in León province, Castile and León, Spain. As of 2020, it has a population of 20.

== Geography ==
Calaveras de Abajo is located 65km east-northeast of León, Spain.
