= Villaverde de Arcayos =

- Locality
- Location within Province of León Location within Castile and León Location within Spain
- Coordinates: 42°36′25″N 5°2′19″W
- Country: Spain
- Autonomous community: Castile and León
- Province: Province of León
- Municipality: Almanza
- Elevation: 880 m (2,890 ft)

Population
  - Total: 124

Villaverde de Arcayos is a locality located in the municipality of Almanza, in León province, Castile and León, Spain. As of 2020, it has a population of 124.

== Geography ==
Villaverde de Arcayos is located 63km east of León, Spain.
