= Silacayoápam =

- Municipality
- Nickname: Sila
- Location in Mexico
- Coordinates: 17°30′0″N 98°8′0″W
- Country: Mexico
- State: Oaxaca

Area
  - Total: 417.2 km^{2} (161.1 sq mi)
- Elevation: 1,620 m (5,310 ft)

Population (2005)
  - Total: 6,486
- Time zone: UTC-6 (Central Standard Time)

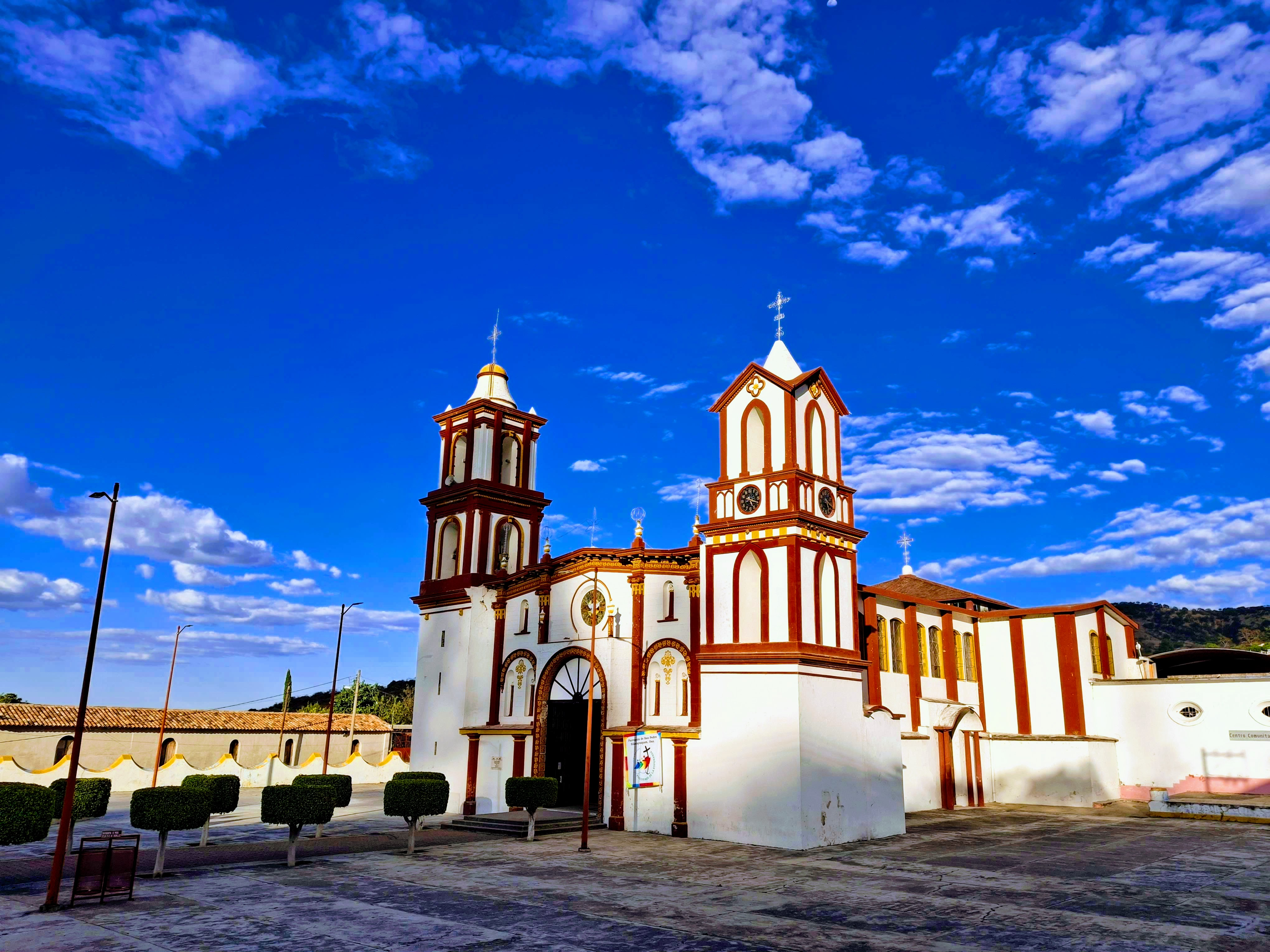
Church of San Pedro, Silacayoápam c. 2025

Silacayoápam (Mixtec: Ñuunduyu, 'Place of the Chilacayote Gourds') is a town and municipality in Oaxaca in south-western Mexico. It is part of the Silacayoapam District in the Mixteca Region.

== Geography ==
The municipality covers an area of 417.2 km^{2}. Once part of the Coixtlahuaca state, after the Spanish conquest the town was officially founded in 1692. It is at an elevation of 1,620 meters in a mountain valley in northwestern Oaxaca.

== Demography ==
As of 2005, the municipality had a total population of 6,486 of whom 1,392 spoke an indigenous language, living in 1,532 households.

== Economy ==
The main economic activity is agriculture, accounting for 80% of the economy. The main crops are corn, beans and some fruits, as well as wheat. Some of the people raise cattle and poultry. There is some artisan production of mezcal, brandy, woven sisal, palm and ceramics.

== See also ==
- San Martín del Estado
