= San Agustín Atenango =

- Municipality and town
- Location in Mexico
- Coordinates: 17°36′40″N 98°00′50″W
- Country: Mexico
- State: Oaxaca

Area
  - Total: 82.93 km^{2} (32.02 sq mi)

Population (2005)
  - Total: 1,787
- Time zone: UTC-6 (Central Standard Time)

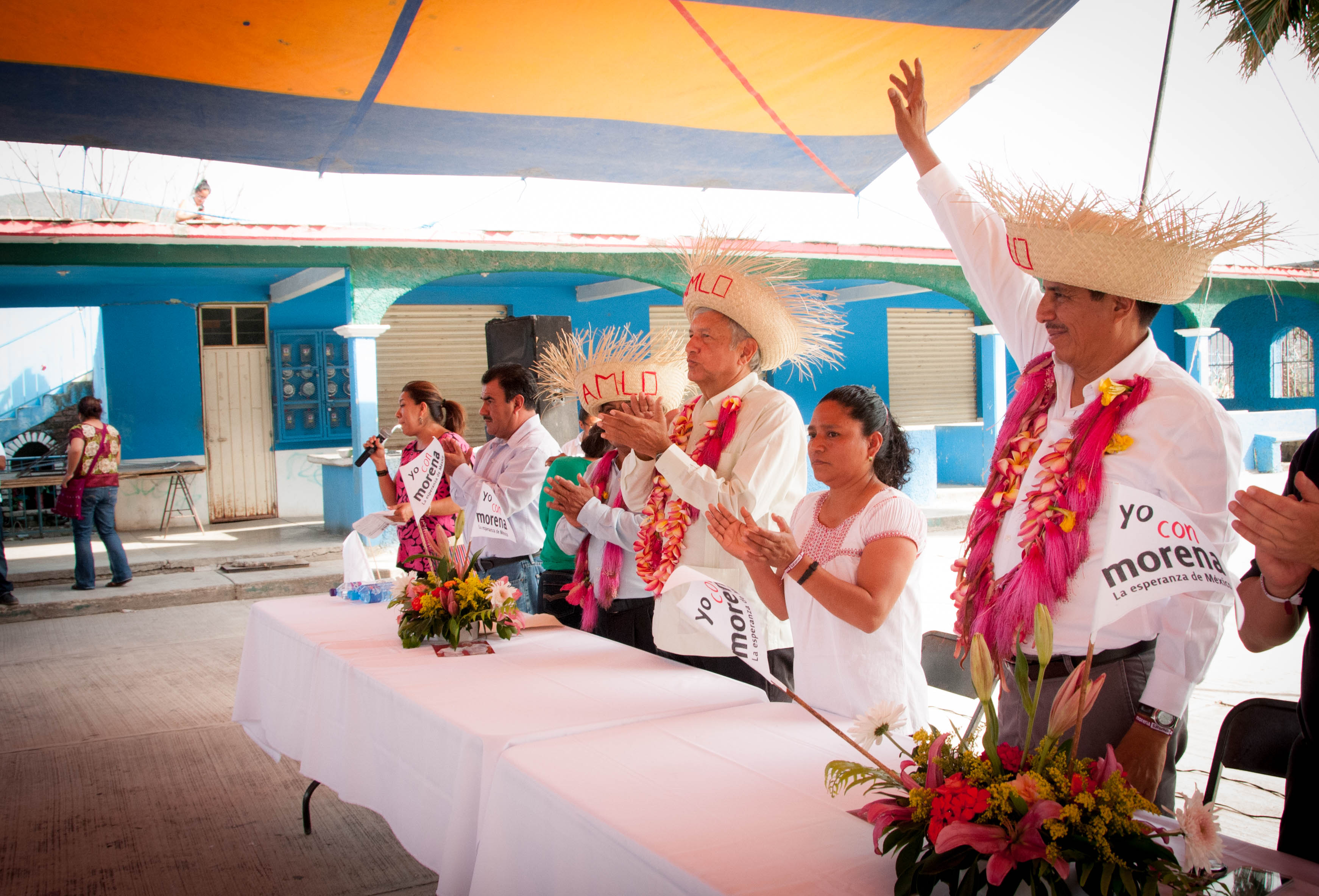
AMLO and Salomón Jara in San Agustín Atenango on March 18, 2016

San Agustín Atenango (Mixtec: Yojo Ndavi, ‘Deep Plain’) is a town and municipality in Oaxaca in south-western Mexico. The municipality covers an area of 82.93 km^{2}. It is part of the Silacayoapam District in the Mixteca Region.

== Demographics ==
As of 2020, the municipality had a total population of 1,871. Out of the town's population, 963 are female (51.5%), and 908 are male (48.5%). The primary indigenous language spoken in San Agustín Atenango is Mixteco, with 892 people (47.9%) speaking the language. 934 people in the town (49.9%) live in moderate poverty, while 404 people (21.6%) live in extreme poverty. In the town, 1,586 people are indigenous, and 21 people are Afro-Mexican.
