= Silacayoápam District =

- District
- Oaxaca regions and districts: Mixteca to Northwest
- Coordinates: 17°30′0″N 98°8′0″W
- Country: Mexico
- State: Oaxaca

Population (2020)
  - Total: 35,860

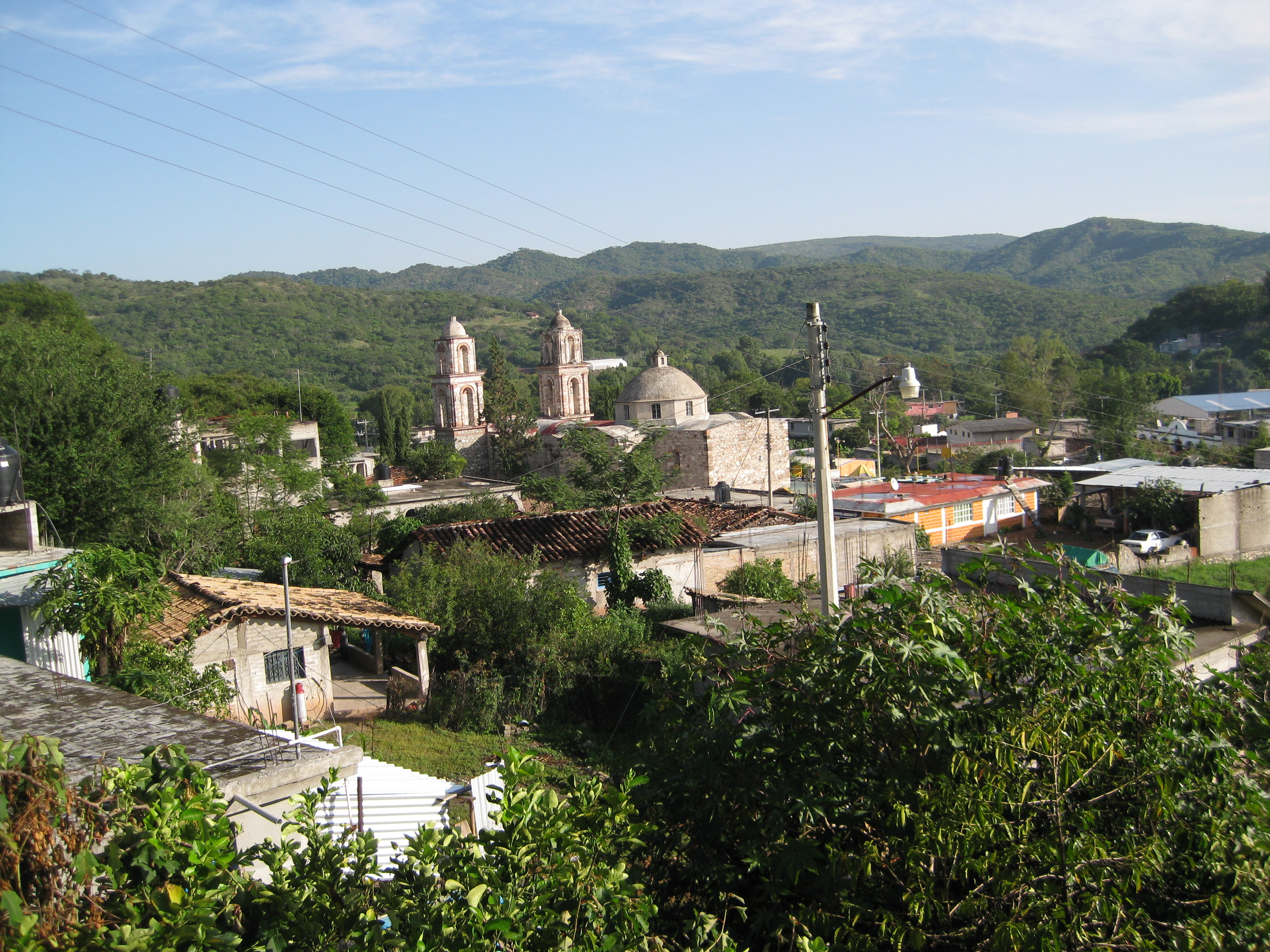
Santiago del Rio

Silacayoápam District is located in the northwest of the Mixteca Region of the State of Oaxaca, Mexico.

The climate is temperate, with average temperature of 20.6 °C. The warmest area is the municipality of San Nicolás Hidalgo (21.1 °C) and the coolest is San Mateo Nejapam (19.6 °C). Annual rainfall is about 920 mm, with highest rainfall in September. The region has coniferous forests that include ceiba, huanacastle, pine, strawberry, moral, and oak. Wildlife include rattlesnake, quail, frog, lynx, mountain rabbit, coyote, gray fox, owl, red squirrel, eagle, hawk, necklace dove and owl.

== Municipalities ==
Silacayoápam municipalities

The district includes the following municipalities:

Municipality code	Name	Population		Land Area			Population density	
Municipality code	Name	2020	Rank	km^{2}	sq mi	Rank	2020	Rank
011	Calihualá	1,402	9	67.68	26.13	10	21/km^{2} (54/sq mi)	8
034	Guadalupe de Ramírez	1,288	10	30.83	11.90	17	42/km^{2} (108/sq mi)	3
065	Ixpantepec Nieves	1,079	12	72.53	28.00	9	15/km^{2} (39/sq mi)	16
081	San Agustín Atenango	1,871	7	96.47	37.25	5	19/km^{2} (50/sq mi)	11
099	San Andrés Tepetlapa	381	19	14.40	5.56	19	26/km^{2} (69/sq mi)	4
152	San Francisco Tlapancingo	2,472	5	99.64	38.47	4	25/km^{2} (64/sq mi)	6
183	San Juan Bautista Tlachichilco	1,475	8	88.67	34.24	7	17/km^{2} (43/sq mi)	14
186	San Juan Cieneguilla	524	17	89.99	34.75	6	6/km^{2} (15/sq mi)	20
199	San Juan Ihualtepec	494	18	52.21	20.16	13	9/km^{2} (25/sq mi)	19
230	San Lorenzo Victoria	932	15	51.98	20.07	14	18/km^{2} (46/sq mi)	13
251	San Mateo Nejapam	1,217	11	63.97	24.70	11	19/km^{2} (49/sq mi)	12
259	San Miguel Ahuehuetitlán	2,142	6	86.14	33.26	8	25/km^{2} (64/sq mi)	5
286	San Miguel Tlacotepec	3,100	4	55.58	21.46	12	56/km^{2} (144/sq mi)	2
290	San Nicolás Hidalgo	1,043	13	11.35	4.38	20	92/km^{2} (238/sq mi)	1
376	Santa Cruz de Bravo	365	20	18.38	7.10	18	20/km^{2} (51/sq mi)	10
461	Santiago del Río	527	16	38.42	14.83	16	14/km^{2} (36/sq mi)	17
484	Santiago Tamazola	4,458	2	201.2	77.7	3	22/km^{2} (57/sq mi)	7
501	Santiago Yucuyachi	998	14	50.15	19.36	15	20/km^{2} (52/sq mi)	9
537	Silacayoápam	6,710	1	431.6	166.6	1	16/km^{2} (40/sq mi)	15
567	Zapotitlán Lagunas	3,382	3	305.4	117.9	2	11/km^{2} (29/sq mi)	18
	Distrito Silacayoápam	35,860	—	1,927	744.02	—	19/km^{2} (48/sq mi)	—
Source: INEGI
