= Castromudarra =

- Locality
- Location within Province of León Location within Castile and León Location within Spain
- Coordinates: 42°36′43″N 5°3′42″W
- Country: Spain
- Autonomous community: Castile and León
- Province: Province of León
- Municipality: Almanza
- Elevation: 929 m (3,048 ft)

Population
  - Total: 33

Castromudarra is a locality located in the municipality of Almanza, in León province, Castile and León, Spain. As of 2020, it has a population of 33.

== Geography ==
Castromudarra is located 58km east of León, Spain.
