= La Vega de Almanza =

- Locality
- Location within Province of León Location within Castile and León Location within Spain
- Coordinates: 42°43′56″N 5°0′19″W
- Country: Spain
- Autonomous community: Castile and León
- Province: Province of León
- Municipality: Almanza
- Elevation: 945 m (3,100 ft)

Population
  - Total: 26

La Vega de Almanza is a locality located in the municipality of Almanza, in León province, Castile and León, Spain. As of 2020, it has a population of 26.

== Geography ==
La Vega de Almanza is located 67km east-northeast of León, Spain.
