= Almanza =

- Flag Coat of arms

- Location within Spain
- Coordinates: 42°39′32″N 5°2′9″W
- Country: Spain
- Autonomous community: Castile and León
- Province: León
- Municipality: Almanza

Government
  - Mayor: José Luis González Rojo (PSOE)

Area
  - Total: 141.99 km^{2} (54.82 sq mi)
- Elevation: 910 m (2,990 ft)

Population (2025-01-01)
  - Total: 570
  - Density: 4.0/km^{2} (10/sq mi)
- Demonyms: almanceño, almanceña; almancense
- Time zone: UTC+1 (CET)
  - Summer (DST): UTC+2 (CEST)
- Postal Code: 24170
- Telephone prefix: 987
- Climate: Cfb

Almanza (Spanish pronunciation: [alˈmanθa]) is a municipality located in the province of León, Castile and León, Spain. According to the 2009 census (INE), the municipality has a population of 609 inhabitants.

== Villages ==
- Almanza
- Cabrera de Almanza
- Calaveras de Abajo
- Calaveras de Arriba
- Canalejas
- Castromudarra
- Espinosa de Almanza
- La Vega de Almanza
- Villaverde de Arcayos

== See also ==
- Tierra de Campos
- Almansa in the province of Albacete
