= San Juan Bautista Tlachichilco =

- Municipality and town
- Location in Mexico
- Coordinates: 17°34′N 98°21′W
- Country: Mexico
- State: Oaxaca

Area
  - Total: 183.7 km^{2} (70.9 sq mi)

Population (2005)
  - Total: 2,241
- Time zone: UTC-6 (Central Standard Time)

San Juan Bautista Tlachichilco is a town and municipality in Oaxaca in south-western Mexico. The municipality covers an area of 183.7 km^{2}. It is part of the Silacayoapam District in the Mixteca Region.

As of 2005, the municipality had a total population of 2,241.
