= Santiago del Río =

- Municipality and town
- Location in Mexico
- Coordinates: 17.4484°N 98.0911°W
- Country: Mexico
- State: Oaxaca

Population (2005)
  - Total: 543
- Time zone: UTC-6 (Central Standard Time)

Santiago del Río is a town and municipality in Oaxaca in south-western Mexico. The municipality is part of the Silacayoapam District in the Mixteca Region.

As of 2005, the municipality had a total population of 543.

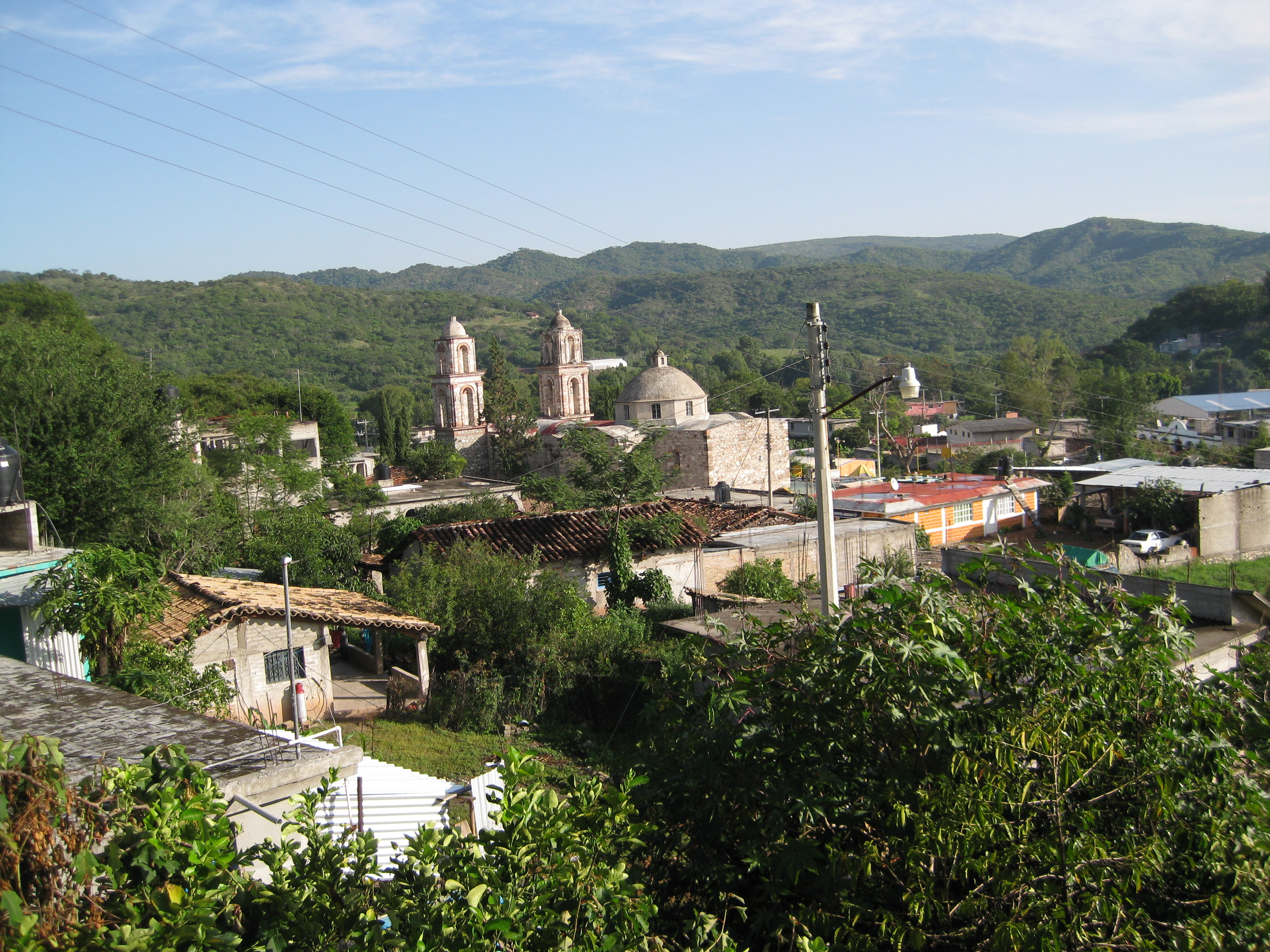
Santiago del Rio

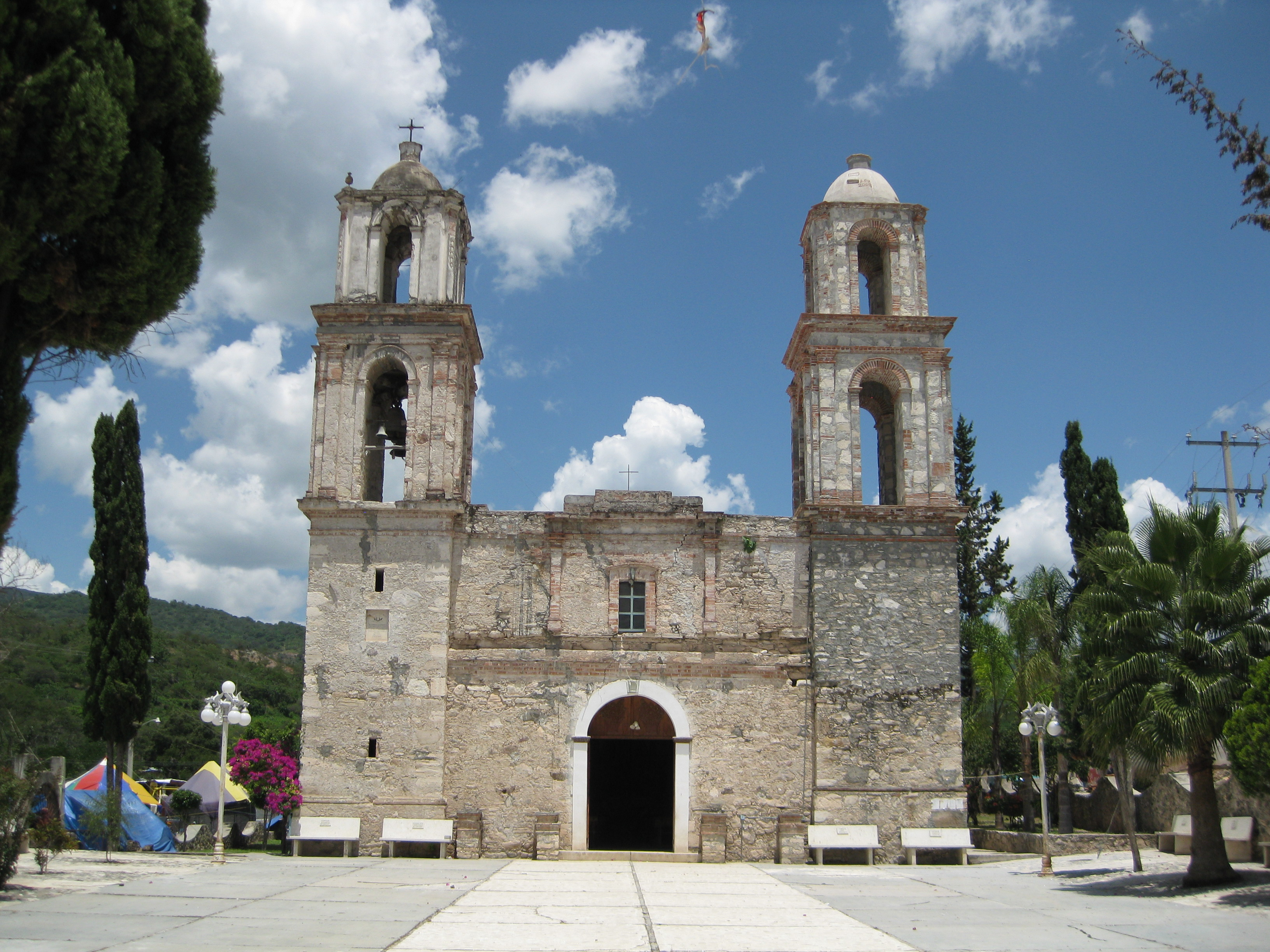
Santiago del Rio's Church
