= Cutzamala de Pinzón (municipality) =

Municipality in the Mexican state of Guerrero

- Municipality
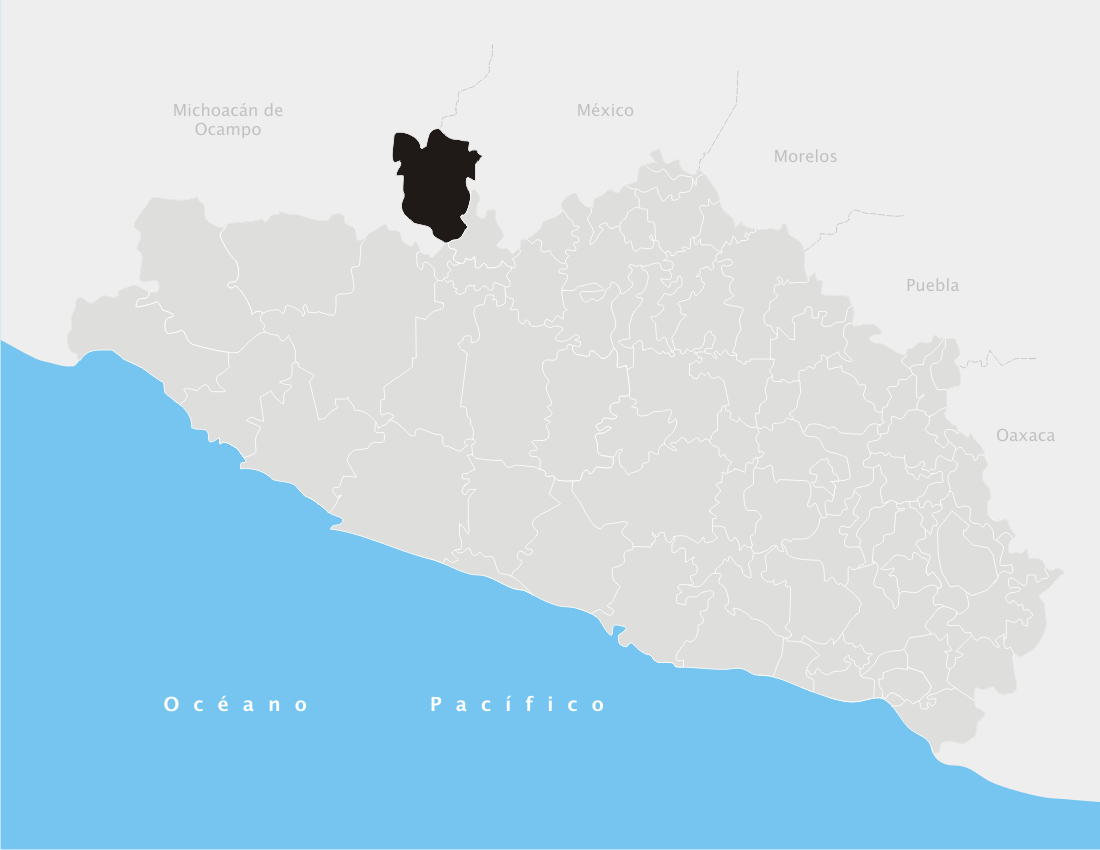
- Municipality of Cutzamala de Pinzón in Guerrero

- Location in Mexico
- Coordinates: 18°24′N 100°28′W
- Country: Mexico
- State: Guerrero
- Municipal seat: Cutzamala de Pinzón

Area
  - Total: 611.1 km^{2} (235.9 sq mi)

Population (2005)
  - Total: 20,730

Cutzamala de Pinzón is a municipality in the Mexican state of Guerrero and is the northernmost municipality in Guerrero. The municipal seat lies at Cutzamala de Pinzón. The municipality covers an area of 611.1 km^{2}.

As of 2005, the municipality had a total population of 20,730.

== Demographics ==
As of the 2020 census, the population of the municipality was 21,388. The 5 largest towns in order of population are:

Town	Population 2020	Elevation
Cutzamala de Pinzón	4,717	278 m
Zacapuato	1,697	376 m
Tamácuaro	931	373 m
Arroyo Grande	837	330 m
Nuevo Galeana	747	314 m
