= Santiago Tamazola =

Coordinates: 17°40′N 98°13′W

- Municipality and town
- Interactive map of Santiago Tamazola
- Country: Mexico
- State: Oaxaca

Population (2005)
  - Total: 259
- Time zone: UTC-6 (Central Standard Time)

Santiago Tamazola is a town and municipality in Oaxaca in south-western Mexico. The municipality covers an area of km^{2}. It is part of the Silacayoapam District in the Mixteca Region.

As of 2005, the municipality had a total population of 259.
