= Xochihuehuetlán (municipality) =

Municipality in the Mexican state of Guerrero

- Municipality
- Location in Mexico Xochihuehuetlán (Mexico)
- Coordinates: 17°45′N 98°01′W
- Country: Mexico
- State: Guerrero
- Municipal seat: Xochihuehuetlán

Area
  - Total: 191.6 km^{2} (74.0 sq mi)

Population (2005)
  - Total: 7,005
- Website: xochihuehuetlan.guerrero.gob.mx

Xochihuehuetlán is a municipality in the Mexican state of Guerrero. The municipal seat lies at Xochihuehuetlán. The municipality covers an area of 191.6 km^{2}.

In 2005, the municipality had a total population of 7,005.
