= Enandio =

Coordinates: 19°19′58″N 100°25′41″W

Enandio is a village in the Juárez Municipality of Michoacán, Mexico, two miles before arriving at Los Laureles, Michoacán (Benito Juarez).

As of 2020, the location had a population of 620 people.
