= Santiago Yucuyachi =

Coordinates: 17°37′N 98°12′W

- Municipality and town
- Interactive map of Santiago Yucuyachi
- Country: Mexico
- State: Oaxaca

Population (2005)
  - Total: 742
- Time zone: UTC-6 (Central Standard Time)
  - Summer (DST): UTC-5 (Central Daylight Time)

Santiago Yucuyachi (monte-breve)is a town and municipality in Oaxaca in south-western Mexico. The municipality covers an area of 90.58 km^{2}. It is part of the Silacayoapam District in the Mixteca Region.

== Demography ==
As of 2005, the municipality had a total population of 742.

The population is largely indigenous (62.16%) and 34.91% speak an indigenous language.
