= Calaveras de Arriba =

- Locality
- Location within Province of León Location within Castile and León Location within Spain
- Coordinates: 42°42′43″N 4°58′9″W
- Country: Spain
- Autonomous community: Castile and León
- Province: Province of León
- Municipality: Almanza
- Elevation: 981 m (3,219 ft)

Population
  - Total: 24

Calaveras de Arriba is a locality located in the municipality of Almanza, in León province, Castile and León, Spain. As of 2020, it has a population of 24.

== Geography ==
Calaveras de Arriba is located 68km east-northeast of León, Spain.
