= Zacapuato, Guerrero =

Town in the Mexican state of Guerrero

Coordinates: 18°40′07″N 100°36′16″W

- Town
- Interactive map of Zacapuato, Guerrero
- Country: Mexico
- Elevation: 336 m (1,102 ft)

Population
  - Total: 1,697

Zacapuato is a town in the municipality of Cutzamala de Pinzón, Guerrero, Mexico. It is the second largest town in the municipality, after Cutzamala, the municipal seat. As of the 2020 Mexican Census the population of the town is 1,697.

== Etymology ==
The name Zacapuato is a Purépecha word that means "cerro pedregoso" in Spanish which in English is "stony mount".

== Geography ==
Zacapuato is located in the state of Guerrero and the region known as Tierra Caliente. Zacapuato has to its west the Bejucos River, a river which runs from the mountains of the State of Mexico to the Cutzamala River. Zacapuato, other to than to its west, has mostly flat lands with some hills and small mountains.

== Demographics ==
Historical population
Year	Pop.	±%
1900	230	—
1921	291	+26.5%
1930	339	+16.5%
1950	482	+42.2%
1960	831	+72.4%
1980	1,317	+58.5%
1990	1,730	+31.4%
2000	2,054	+18.7%
2005	1,686	−17.9%
2010	1,860	+10.3%
2020	1,697	−8.8%

On the 2020 Census, Zacapuato was reported to have 1,697 people. This was a decrease from 1,860 people in the 2010 census. Zacapuato's peak population was in the year 2000 when it reached a population of 2,054.

== Transportation ==
The town is served by a few unnumbered roads that take it to neighboring towns. There are roads that go toward Alborejo, which eventually ends at Mexican Federal Highway 134 and then can be used to go south to Cutzamala or Ciudad Altamirano, or to go north to Bejucos or Tejupilco. There is a road going north to Camutla, and another road that goes to El Gallo Dam, and then to Arroyo Grande, Nuevo Galeana, and then eventually to Cutzamala.
