= San Lorenzo Victoria =

- Municipality and town
- Location in Mexico
- Coordinates: 17°40′N 98°07′W
- Country: Mexico
- State: Oaxaca

Area
  - Total: 30.62 km^{2} (11.82 sq mi)

Population (2005)
  - Total: 948
- Time zone: UTC-6 (Central Standard Time)

San Lorenzo Victoria is a town and municipality in Oaxaca in south-western Mexico. The municipality covers an area of 30.62 km^{2}. It is part of the Silacayoapam District in the Mixteca Region.

As of 2005, the municipality had a total population of 948.
