= Huamuxtitlán (municipality) =

Municipality in the Mexican state of Guerrero

- Municipality
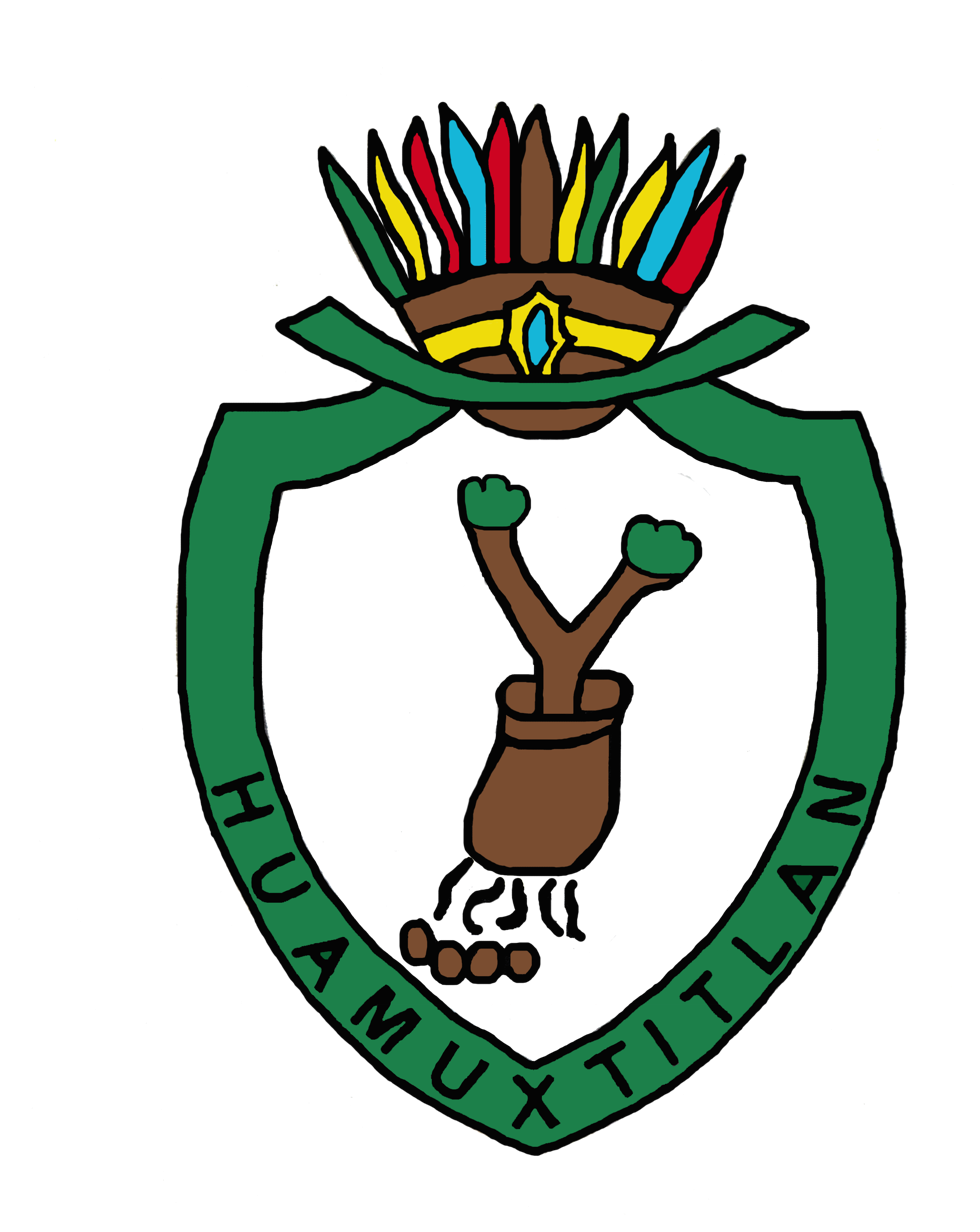
- Coat of arms

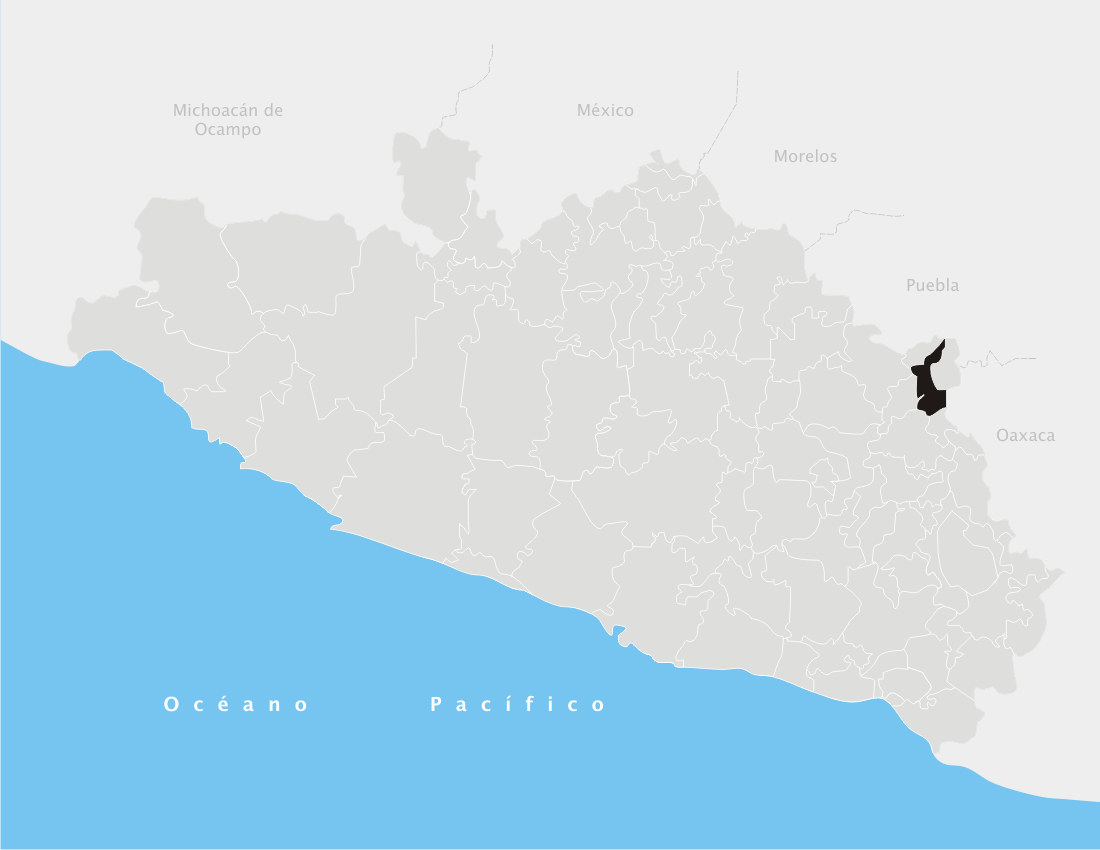
- Municipality of Huamuxtitlán in Guerrero

- Location in Mexico
- Coordinates: 17°41′N 98°26′W
- Country: Mexico
- State: Guerrero
- Municipal seat: Huamuxtitlán

Area
  - Total: 432.5 km^{2} (167.0 sq mi)

Population (2005)
  - Total: 13,806

Huamuxtitlán is a municipality in the Mexican state of Guerrero. The municipal seat lies at Huamuxtitlán. The municipality covers an area of 432.5 km^{2}.

In 2005, the municipality had a total population of 13,806.
