= Guadalupe de Ramírez =

- Municipality and town
- Location in Mexico
- Coordinates: 17°45′N 98°10′W
- Country: Mexico
- State: Oaxaca

Area
  - Total: 59.96 km^{2} (23.15 sq mi)

Population (2005)
  - Total: 1,214
- Time zone: UTC-6 (Central Standard Time)

Guadalupe de Ramírez is a town and municipality in Oaxaca in south-western Mexico. The municipality covers an area of 59.96 km^{2}. It is part of the Silacayoapam District in the Mixteca Region.

As of 2005, the municipality had a total population of 1,214.
