= Canalejas, León =

Canalejas
- Locality
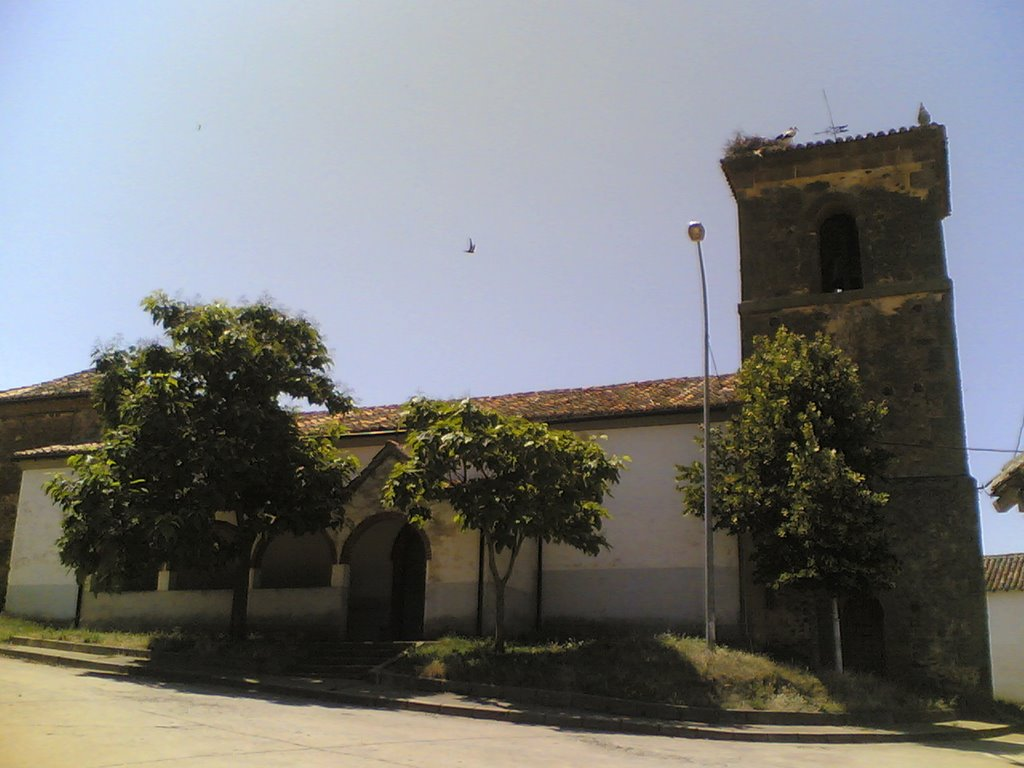

- Location within Province of León Location within Castile and León Location within Spain
- Coordinates: 42°40′16″N 4°59′8″W
- Country: Spain
- Autonomous community: Castile and León
- Province: Province of León
- Municipality: Almanza
- Elevation: 974 m (3,196 ft)

Population
  - Total: 59

Canalejas is a locality located in the municipality of Almanza, in León province, Castile and León, Spain. As of 2020, it has a population of 59.

== Geography ==
Canalejas is located 64km east of León, Spain.
