= Juárez Municipality, Michoacán =

Coordinates: 19°19′N 100°26′W

Juárez
- Municipality
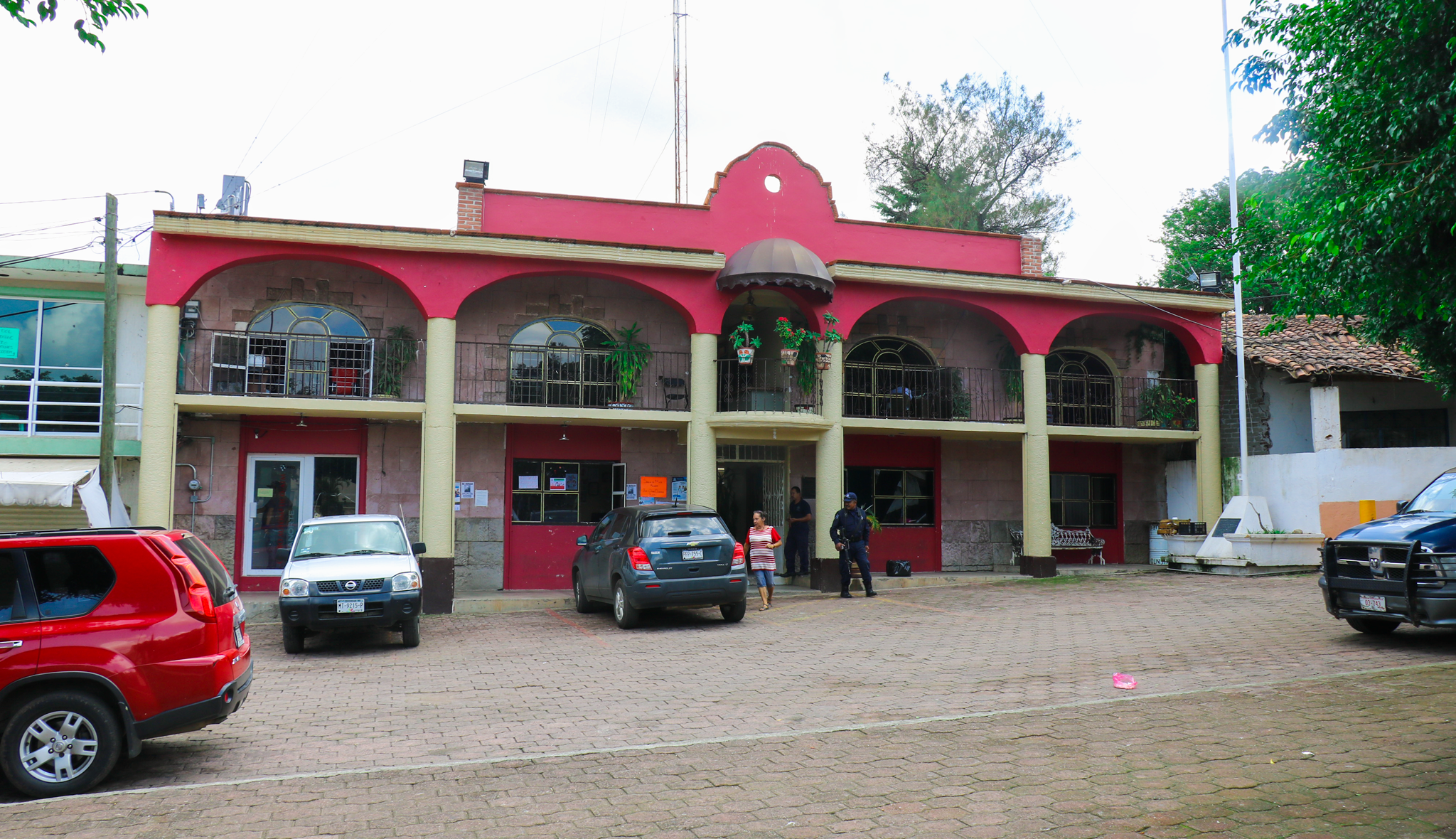
- Town hall

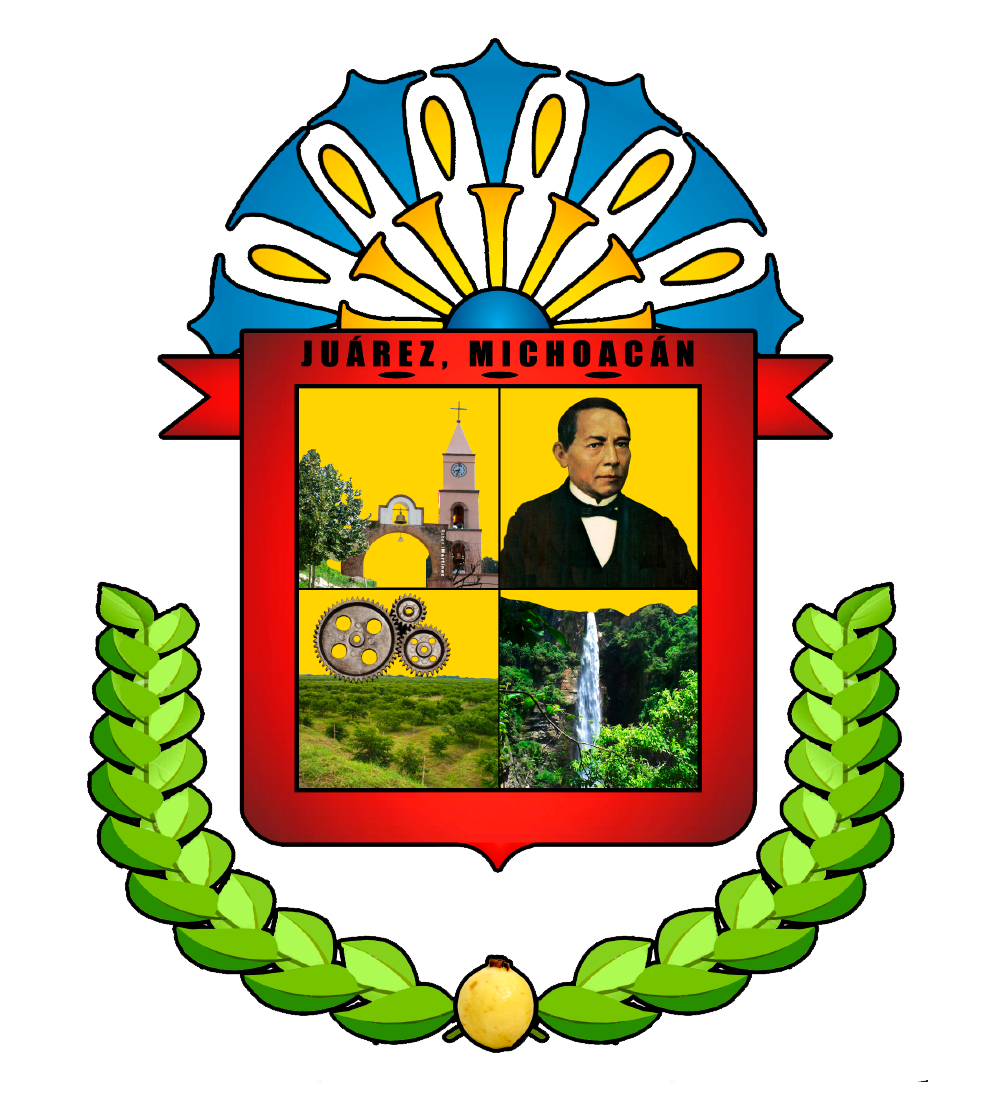
- Coat of arms

- Location in Mexico Juárez (Mexico)
- Country: Mexico
- State: Michoacán
- Demonym: (in Spanish)
- Time zone: UTC−6 (CST)

Juárez is a municipality in the Mexican state of Michoacán. The municipality has an area of 141.21 square kilometres (0.24% of the surface of the state) and is bordered to the north by the municipality of Zitácuaro, to the east and south Susupuato, and to the west by Tuzantla and Jungapeo. The municipality had a population of 12, 016 inhabitants according to the 2005 census. Its municipal seat is the city of Benito Juárez.

It is unknown what ethnic group dominated the present day municipality of Juárez region in pre-Columbian times.

The municipality is named after Benito Juárez, a Zapotec Amerindian who served five terms (1858–1861), (1861–1865), (1865–1867), (1867–1871), and (1871–1872), as President of Mexico.

== Localities ==
- Enandio

== See also ==
- Municipalities of Mexico
