= San Luis de la Loma =

San Luis
- Town
- San Luis de la Loma
- Location within Mexico
- Coordinates: 17.2714°N 100.891056°W
- Country: Mexico
- State: Guerrero
- Municipality: Tecpán de Galeana
- Founded: 1834
- Elevation: 20 m (66 ft)

Population
  - Total: 11,090
- Demonym(s): sanluiseño, -ña
- Time zone: UTC-6 (Central)
- Postal code: 40906
- Area code: 742

San Luis de la Loma is a town in the municipality of Tecpan de Galeana in the Mexican state of Guerrero. San Luis de La Loma is the second most populous town in Tecpan de Galeana; it has 11,090 inhabitants. For this town the road passes Acapulco - Zihuatanejo. Its climate is Warm / Tropical rainfall in summer. In recent years, San Luis de La Loma is one of the villages Vuleta most dangerous of the state of Guerrero as the dominant drug trafficking in the area and the Sierra de San Luis is one of the largest producers of opium gum, and why is commonly known to many as "Gum San Luis."

== Agriculture ==
The climate in San Luis de la Loma is tropical, and the main crop is the mango, several varieties of which are grown (Ataulfo, Manila, Child, Ball). The mangoes of this area are prized for their quality.

Other agriculture in San Luis de la Loma includes coconut, corn, sesame, chili, papaya and banana.

== Public transport ==
San Luis de la Loma has two taxi hubs: a mixed-type taxi stand, and one for Combis, Urvans and trucks near the Route San Luis-Tecpan de Galena, San Luis-San Pedro, and San Luis-Puerto Vicente Guerrero. There is also a bus station from which buses (Estrella de Oro, Estrella Blanca, and Costa Line) transport passengers to the principal cities of the state of Guerrero and to Mexico City. The village also has its own terminal (Costa Grande Buses) servicing a San Luis de la Loma to Acapulco route.

== Services ==
San Luis de la Loma has the following services and amenities:

- Cable television (Telecable San-San)
- Medical clinic (San Luis Rey)
- Groceries (San Luis, etc.)
- Hotels (Hotel Ruiz, Anita Hotel)
- Internet (Prodigy Infinitum)
- Pharmacy (Related, Pharma and More, Angels, etc.).
- Satellite TV (Sky, Dish)
- SSA (health center)
- Street lighting
- Telephony (Telmex, Telcel)
- Water and sewage

== Education ==
The town has schools from kindergarten through high school.

Preschool

- Prof. Gabriela Mistral
- Amado Nervo

Primary

- General Hermenegildo Galeana
- Prof. Romana Acosta Berdeja
- Primary Rafael Ramirez

Secondary

- Technical Secondary School No. 180, "Valente de la Cruz"

high school

- Bachilles14-a

== Distinguished residents ==
- Valente de la Cruz (Mexican revolutionary born in San Luis)
- Romana Acosta Berdeja (teacher, wife of Valente de la Cruz)
- Jose Manuel Zamacona (Mexican singer-songwriter of the musical group Los Yonic's)
- Ramon Ruiz (landowner and founder of Hotel Ruiz)

=== Valente de la Cruz ===
Valente de la Cruz was a leader and farmer. He was born on 22 May 1894, in San Luis de la Loma, Tecpan de Galeana, Mexico. Despite the few educational opportunities he had, he became a professor at the former Royal School in Tecpan, and would become the director.

After listening to a 1920 speech by labor leader John R. Escudero, he began to be politically active. By 1922 he had become a political leader, forming Partido Obrero Campesino, on the platform that large landowners should yield some of their land to farmers in the Costa Grande, a project that would encourage the formation of ejidos.

De la Cruz once met with President Álvaro Obregón to explain the precarious situation in the state, where those who had been property-owners now had nowhere to grow. In September 1923, during his third trip to Mexico City in search of presidential support, he was arrested and executed.
