= El Escondido =

- Volcán El Escondido
- Location within Colombia

Highest point
- Elevation: 1,700 m (5,600 ft)
- Listing: Volcanoes of Colombia
- Coordinates: 05°31′10.1″N 75°02′36.5″W

Geography
- Location: Samaná, Caldas; Colombia
- Parent range: Central Ranges, Andes

Geology
- Rock age: Late Pleistocene (<30,000 years)
- Mountain type: Pyroclastic ring
- Volcanic belt: North Volcanic Zone; Andean Volcanic Belt
- Last eruption: Prehistoric

El Escondido (Spanish for "The Hidden One") is a volcano of the Central Ranges of the Colombian Andes in the department of Caldas. The volcano is approximately 1,700 metres (5,600 ft) high.

The volcano, a pyroclastic ring, was discovered in the Selva de Florencia National Natural Park in Samaná, in 2013 based on volcanic products of the volcano, different from those of San Diego to the northeast. The volcano formed approximately 30,000 years ago. The volcano overlies the Early Eocene Florencia Stock.

== See also ==
- List of volcanoes in Colombia
- List of volcanoes by elevation
