= Tecoanapa =

City in the Mexican state of Guerrero

- Municipal seat and city
- Location in Mexico Tecoanapa (Mexico)
- Coordinates: 16°53′N 99°24′W
- Country: Mexico
- State: Guerrero
- Municipality: Tecoanapa
- Time zone: UTC-6 (Zona Centro)

Tecoanapa is a city and seat of the municipality of Tecoanapa, in the Mexican state of Guerrero.

== Notes ==
The American movie Rambo: First Blood Part II (1985) was filmed in Tecoanapa.
