= Olmos de Peñafiel =

Coordinates: 41°34′N 4°02′W

Olmos de Peñafiel, Spain
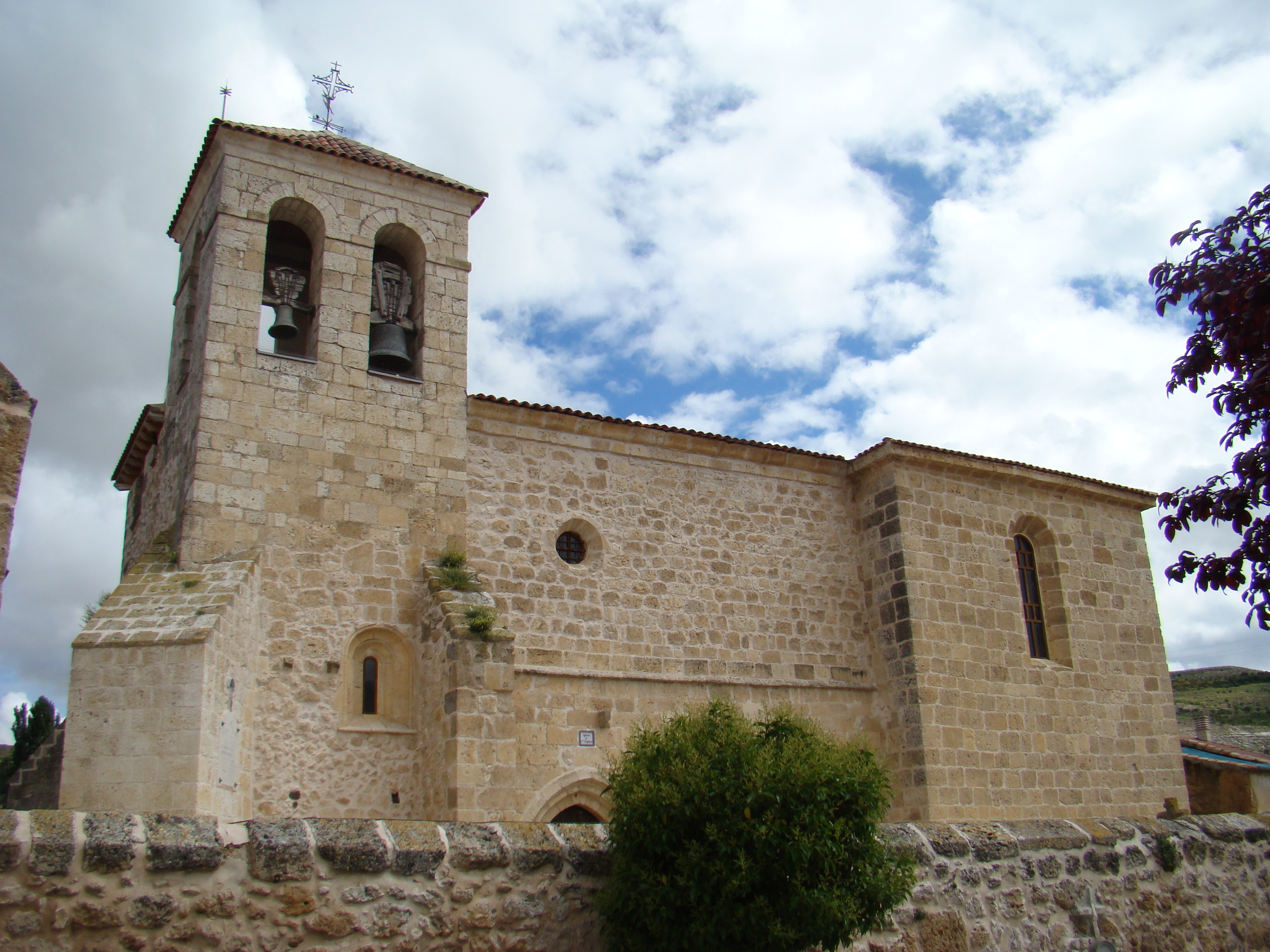
- Church of Olmos de Peñafiel
- Interactive map of Olmos de Peñafiel, Spain
- Country: Spain
- Autonomous community: Castile and León
- Province: Valladolid
- Municipality: Olmos de Peñafiel

Area
  - Total: 16 km^{2} (6.2 sq mi)

Population (2025-01-01)
  - Total: 35
  - Density: 2.2/km^{2} (5.7/sq mi)
- Time zone: UTC+1 (CET)
  - Summer (DST): UTC+2 (CEST)

Olmos de Peñafiel is a municipality located in the province of Valladolid, Castile and León, Spain. According to the 2004 census (INE), the municipality has a population of 80 inhabitants.
