= San Juan Ihualtepec =

- Municipality and town
- Location in Mexico
- Coordinates: 17°40′N 98°17′W
- Country: Mexico
- State: Oaxaca

Area
  - Total: 146.72 km^{2} (56.65 sq mi)

Population (2005)
  - Total: 717
- Time zone: UTC-6 (Central Standard Time)

San Juan Ihualtepec (Mixtec: Yucunicana, 'Hill of the Brave Dead') is a town and municipality in Oaxaca in south-western Mexico. The municipality covers an area of 146.72 km^{2}. It is part of the Silacayoapam District in the Mixteca Region.

As of 2005, the municipality had a total population of 717.
