= San Martín del Estado =

Mexican village

Coordinates: 17°35′N 98°10′W

San Martin del Estado is a small village of the state of Oaxaca, Mexico. With a population of approximately 1,000 people (cite) it is hidden in the midst of the Sierra Madre of Oaxaca. Most of the people from this village have migrated to the United States in cities like Santa Maria, Farmersville, Oceanside, and Oxnard, California, as well as Mesa, Arizona.

It is a historic village known for the mining of gold, silver, and mercury by Spanish settlers were. Several mines are still in place. The village is also known for its friendly environment and is one of the few that still practice communal sharing as the ancient Mixteco people did.

Its previous name was "El Real de Minas," or "The Royal Mines." The villagers celebrate an annual festival from November 8 to November 12. This is when their village saint San Martin Caballero is honored amidst an environment of live music and traditional Oaxacan food.
