= San Juan Cieneguilla =

- Municipality and town
- Location in Mexico
- Coordinates: 17°51′N 98°17′W
- Country: Mexico
- State: Oaxaca

Area
  - Total: 167.13 km^{2} (64.53 sq mi)

Population (2005)
  - Total: 556
- Time zone: UTC-6 (Central Standard Time)

San Juan Cieneguilla is a town and municipality in Oaxaca in south-western Mexico. It is part of the Silacayoapam District in the Mixteca Region. The municipality covers an area of 167.13 km^{2}.

As of 2005, the municipality had a total population of 556.
