= Alpoyeca =

City in the Mexican state of Guerrero

- Municipal seat and city
- Location in Mexico Alpoyeca (Mexico)
- Coordinates: 17°40′N 98°31′W
- Country: Mexico
- State: Guerrero
- Municipality: Alpoyeca

Alpoyeca is a city and the seat of the Alpoyeca Municipality, in the state of Guerrero, southern Mexico.
