= Xochihuehuetlán =

City in the Mexican state of Guerrero

- Municipal seat and city
- Location within Guerrero Location within Mexico
- Coordinates: 17°55′N 98°26′W
- Country: Mexico
- State: Guerrero
- Municipality: Xochihuehuetlán
- Time zone: UTC-6 (Zona Centro)

Xochihuehuetlán is a city and seat of the municipality of Xochihuehuetlán, in the southern Mexican state of Guerrero.

== Geography ==
=== Climate ===
Climate data for Xochihuehuetlán (1951–2010)
| Month | Jan | Feb | Mar | Apr | May | Jun | Jul | Aug | Sep | Oct | Nov | Dec | Year |
|---|---|---|---|---|---|---|---|---|---|---|---|---|---|
| Record high °C (°F) | 36.0 (96.8) | 38.0 (100.4) | 42.0 (107.6) | 42.0 (107.6) | 43.0 (109.4) | 42.0 (107.6) | 41.0 (105.8) | 43.0 (109.4) | 42.0 (107.6) | 37.0 (98.6) | 37.0 (98.6) | 36.0 (96.8) | 43.0 (109.4) |
| Mean daily maximum °C (°F) | 31.3 (88.3) | 33.1 (91.6) | 35.6 (96.1) | 37.6 (99.7) | 37.1 (98.8) | 34.3 (93.7) | 32.8 (91.0) | 33.1 (91.6) | 32.3 (90.1) | 32.1 (89.8) | 32.1 (89.8) | 31.4 (88.5) | 33.6 (92.5) |
| Daily mean °C (°F) | 20.8 (69.4) | 22.6 (72.7) | 24.8 (76.6) | 27.3 (81.1) | 27.9 (82.2) | 26.7 (80.1) | 25.4 (77.7) | 25.5 (77.9) | 25.2 (77.4) | 24.0 (75.2) | 22.2 (72.0) | 20.8 (69.4) | 24.4 (75.9) |
| Mean daily minimum °C (°F) | 10.3 (50.5) | 12.0 (53.6) | 14.1 (57.4) | 16.9 (62.4) | 18.6 (65.5) | 19.1 (66.4) | 17.9 (64.2) | 17.9 (64.2) | 18.1 (64.6) | 15.9 (60.6) | 12.3 (54.1) | 10.3 (50.5) | 15.3 (59.5) |
| Record low °C (°F) | 1.0 (33.8) | 4.5 (40.1) | 4.0 (39.2) | 11.0 (51.8) | 13.5 (56.3) | 14.0 (57.2) | 11.0 (51.8) | 11.5 (52.7) | 12.0 (53.6) | 4.0 (39.2) | 3.0 (37.4) | 2.0 (35.6) | 1.0 (33.8) |
| Average precipitation mm (inches) | 5.4 (0.21) | 3.9 (0.15) | 4.4 (0.17) | 15.6 (0.61) | 70.5 (2.78) | 162.7 (6.41) | 129.1 (5.08) | 153.2 (6.03) | 149.6 (5.89) | 53.0 (2.09) | 7.9 (0.31) | 3.9 (0.15) | 759.2 (29.89) |
| Average precipitation days (≥ 0.1 mm) | 0.9 | 0.6 | 0.7 | 1.9 | 6.4 | 13.9 | 13.5 | 13.5 | 13.3 | 5.4 | 0.9 | 0.5 | 71.5 |
Source: Servicio Meteorologico Nacional
