= Canalejas de Peñafiel =

Coordinates: 41°32′N 4°07′W

Canalejas de Peñafiel, Spain
- Flag Coat of arms
- Interactive map of Canalejas de Peñafiel, Spain
- Country: Spain
- Autonomous community: Castile and León
- Province: Valladolid
- Municipality: Canalejas de Peñafiel

Area
  - Total: 32 km^{2} (12 sq mi)

Population (2025-01-01)
  - Total: 248
  - Density: 7.8/km^{2} (20/sq mi)
- Time zone: UTC+1 (CET)
  - Summer (DST): UTC+2 (CEST)

Canalejas de Peñafiel is a municipality located in the province of Valladolid, Castile and León, Spain. According to the 2004 census (INE), the municipality has a population of 294 inhabitants.
