= Tlalixtaquilla =

City in the Mexican state of Guerrero

- Municipal seat and city
- Location within Guerrero Location within Mexico
- Coordinates: 17°31′N 98°28′W
- Country: Mexico
- State: Guerrero
- Municipality: Tlalixtaquilla
- Time zone: UTC-6 (Zona Centro)

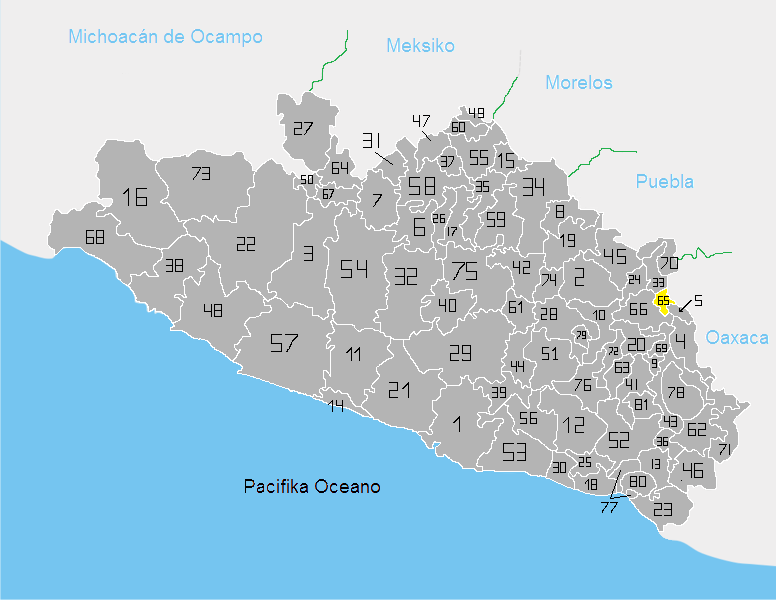
Map of the state of Guerrero

Tlalixtaquilla is a city and seat of the municipality of Tlalixtaquilla, in the Mexican state of Guerrero.
