= Cutzamala de Pinzón =

City in the Mexican state of Guerrero

- Municipal seat and city
- Location in Mexico Cutzamala de Pinzón (Mexico)
- Coordinates: 18°28′1.66″N 100°34′46.6″W
- Country: Mexico
- State: Guerrero
- Municipality: Cutzamala de Pinzón
- Elevation: 278 m (912 ft)

Population (2020)
  - Total: 4,717
- Time zone: UTC-6 (Zona Centro)
- Website: http://www.cutzamaladepinzon.gob.mx/

Cutzamala de Pinzón is a city, and the seat of the municipality of Cutzamala de Pinzón, in the Mexican state of Guerrero. As of 2020 the city has a population of 4,717. It is located in the far northwestern part of the state, on the border with Michoacán.

== Etymology ==
The name Cutzamala comes from a Nahuatl word cutzamallot meaning "rainbow"; hence, "Place of Rainbows.” It was known to Purepecha speakers as "Apatzingani,” which has the same meaning. An alternative theory suggests it is derived from the Nahuatl word cutzamatl, meaning "weasel."

== History ==
=== 19th Century ===
The first battle in the Tierra Caliente region happened in Cutzamala in 1810. In 1860, during the Reform War, Cutzamala was besieged by the Liberals with a force of 4,500 men in the Siege of Cutzamala. The Liberals eventually won the town.

Eutimio Pinzón, often considered the hero of Cutzamala, was the general who defended the town during the Second French Intervention in Mexico in 1874.

== Demographics ==
Historical population
Year	Pop.	±%
1900	1,835	—
1921	2,677	+45.9%
1930	2,479	−7.4%
1960	3,584	+44.6%
1980	3,192	−10.9%
2000	4,810	+50.7%
2005	4,572	−4.9%
2010	4,895	+7.1%
2020	4,717	−3.6%

The population of Cutzamala as of 2020 is 4,717.
