= Huamuxtitlán =

City in the Mexican state of Guerrero

- Municipal seat and city
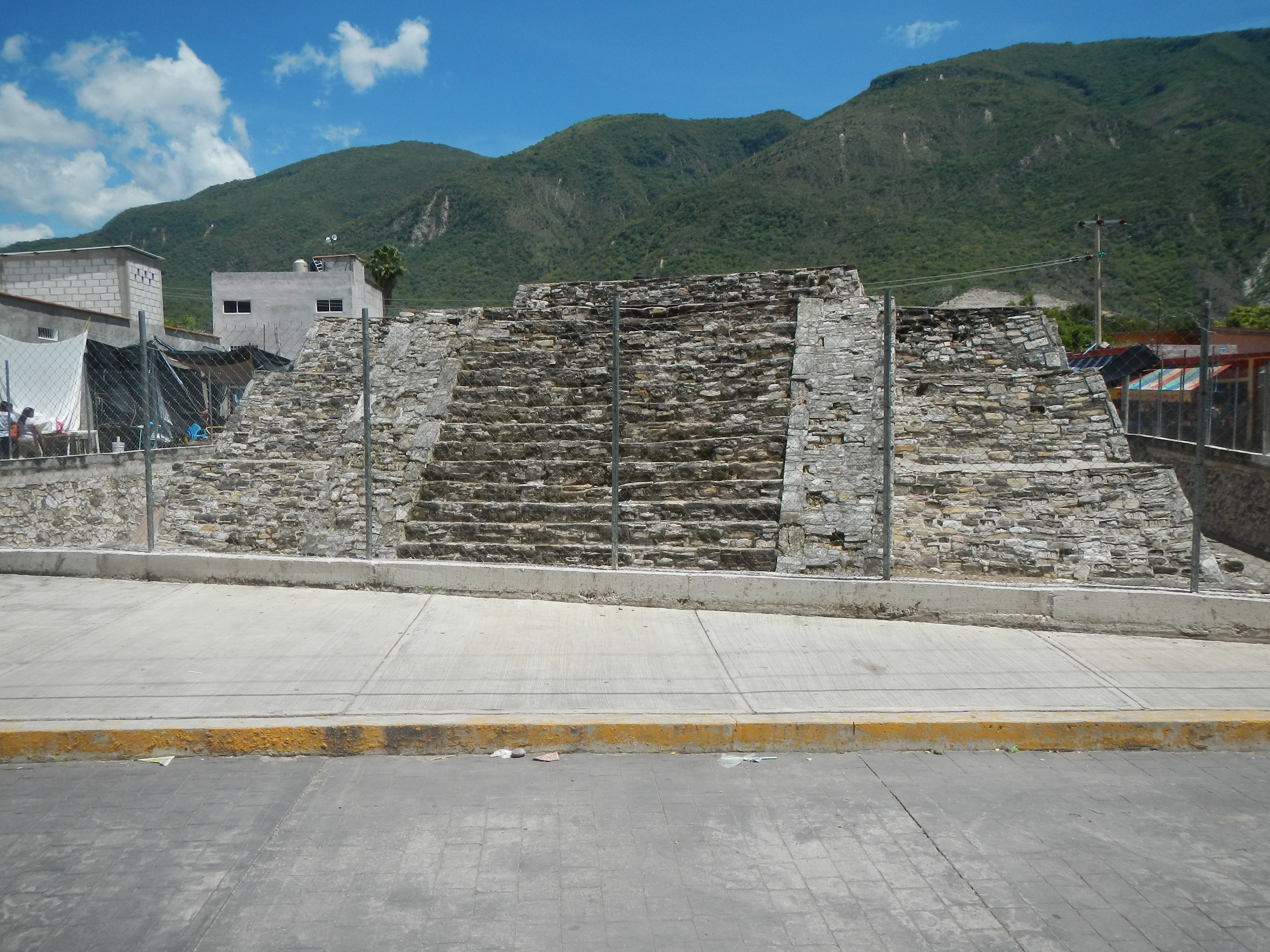
- Pyramid of Huamuxtitlán

- Location in Mexico Huamuxtitlán (Mexico)
- Coordinates: 17°49′N 98°34′W
- Country: Mexico
- State: Guerrero
- Municipality: Huamuxtitlán
- Time zone: UTC-6 (Zona Centro)

Huamuxtitlán is a city and seat of the municipality of Huamuxtitlán, in the southern Mexican state of Guerrero.
