= 35th federal electoral district of the State of Mexico =

Federal electoral district of Mexico

State of Mexico's 35th
- Electoral district of the Chamber of Deputies of Mexico

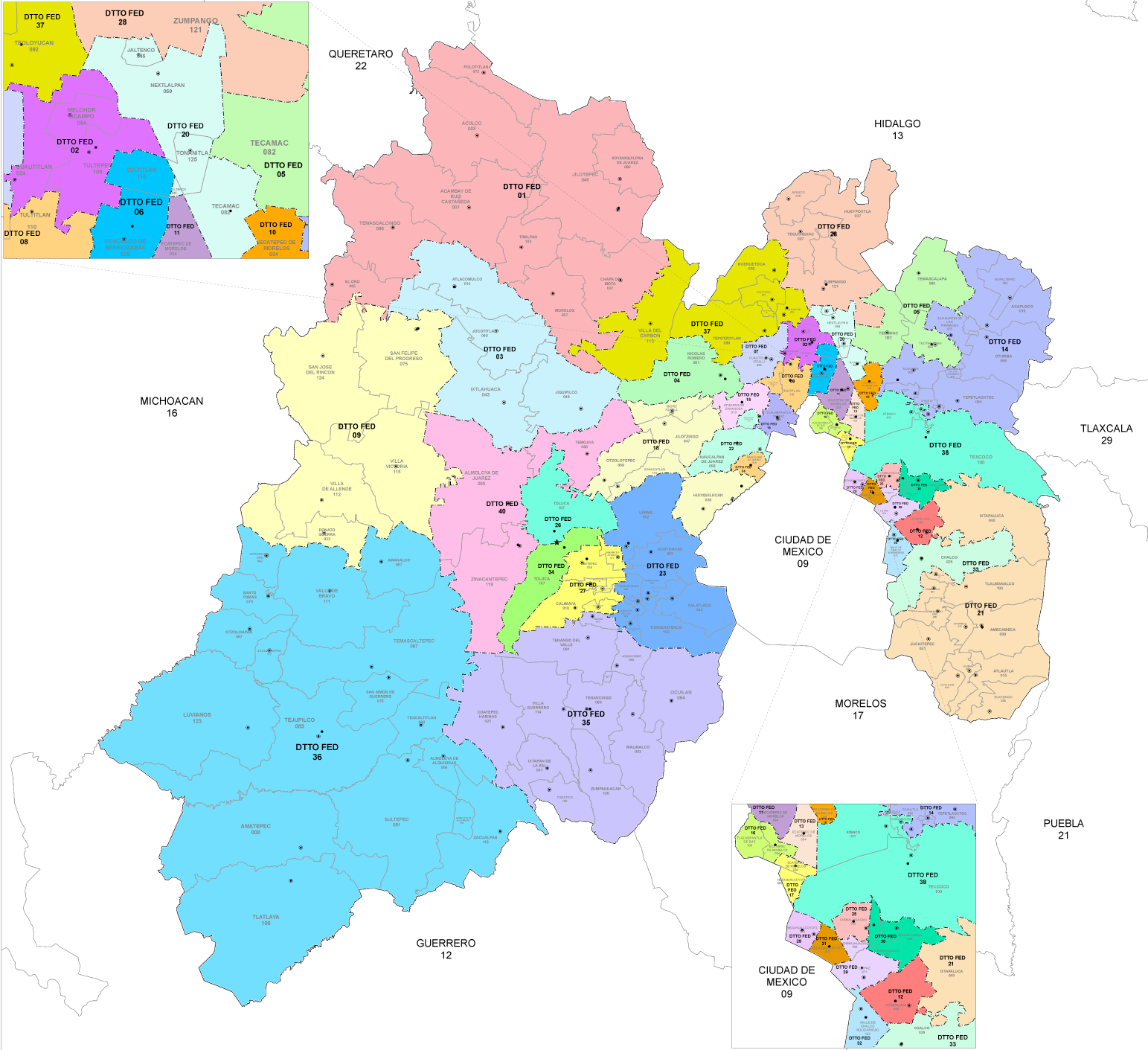
- State of Mexico's districts since 2023

Incumbent
- Member: Arturo Roberto Hernández
- Party: ▌Morena
- Congress: 66th (2024–2027)

District
- State: State of Mexico
- Head town: Tenancingo de Degollado
- Coordinates: 18°57′N 99°35′W
- Covers: 11 municipalities: Coatepec Harinas, Ixtapan de la Sal, Joquicingo, Malinalco, Ocuilan, Rayón, Tenancingo, Tenango del Valle, Tonatico, Villa Guerrero, Zumpahuacán
- PR region: Fifth
- Precincts: 184
- Population: 465,231 (2020 census)

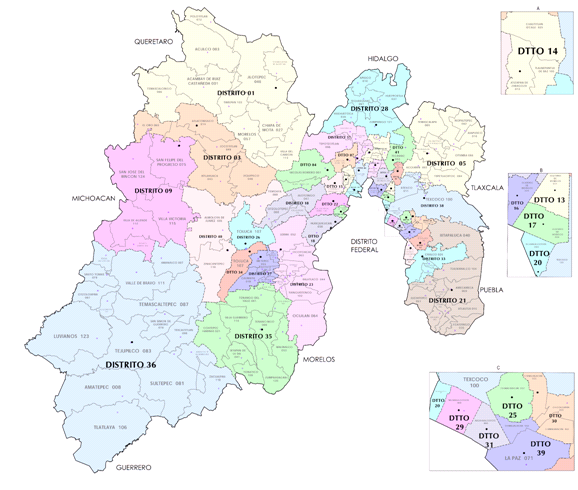
2017–2022 districting scheme

The 35th federal electoral district of the State of Mexico (Spanish: Distrito electoral federal 35 del Estado de México) is one of the 300 electoral districts into which Mexico is divided for elections to the federal Chamber of Deputies and one of 40 such districts in the State of Mexico.

It elects one deputy to the lower house of Congress for each three-year legislative term by means of the first-past-the-post system. Votes cast in the district also count towards the calculation of proportional representation ("plurinominal") deputies elected from the fifth region.

The 35th and 36th districts were created by the Federal Electoral Institute's 1996 redistricting process and were first contested in the 1997 mid-term election.

The current member for the district, re-elected in the 2024 general election, is Arturo Roberto Hernández Tapia of the National Regeneration Movement (Morena).

== District territory ==
Under the 2023 districting plan adopted by the National Electoral Institute (INE), which is to be used for the 2024, 2027 and 2030 federal elections, the 35th district is located in the southern part of the state and covers 184 electoral precincts (secciones electorales) across 11 of its 125 municipalities:

- Coatepec Harinas, Ixtapan de la Sal, Joquicingo, Malinalco, Ocuilan, Rayón, Tenancingo, Tenango del Valle, Tonatico, Villa Guerrero and Zumpahuacán.

The head town (cabecera distrital), where results from individual polling stations are gathered together and tallied, is the city of Tenancingo de Degollado. In the 2020 census, the district reported a total population of 465,231.

== Previous districting schemes ==
Evolution of electoral district numbers
	1974	1978	1996	2005	2017	2023
State of Mexico	15	34	36	40	41	40
Chamber of Deputies	196	300				

Under the previous districting plans enacted by the INE and its predecessors, the 35th district was situated as follows:

2017–2022

Ten municipalities in the south of the state: the same group as under the 2023 plan with the exception of Ocuilan. The head town was at Tenancingo de Degollado.

2005–2017

Eleven municipalities in the south of the state: Almoloya del Río, Capulhuac, Joquicingo, Malinalco, Ocoyoacac, Ocuilan, Santa Cruz Atizapán, Tenancingo, Texcalyacac, Tianguistenco and Xalatlaco. The head town was at Tenancingo de Degollado.

1996–2005

Sixteen municipalities in the south of the state: Almoloya del Río, Calimaya, Capulhuac, Chapultepec, Joquicingo, Malinalco, Ocuilan, Rayón, San Antonio La Isla, Santa Cruz Atizapán, Tenancingo, Tenango del Valle, Texcalyacac, Tianguistenco, Xalatlaco and Zumpahuacan. The head town was at Tenancingo de Degollado.

== Deputies returned to Congress ==
(Mexico) National parties
- Current
- PAN
- PRI
- PT
- PVEM
- MC
- Morena
- PAZ
- Somos
- Defunct or local only
- PLM
- PNR
- PRM
- PNM
- PP
- PPS
- PARM
- PFCRN
- CON
- PANAL
- PSD
- PES
- PES
- PRD

State of Mexico's 35th district
Election	Deputy	Party	Term	Legislature
1997	Cecilia Eulalia López Rodríguez	Institutional Revolutionary Party	1997–2000	57th Congress
2000	Jaime Vázquez Castillo	Institutional Revolutionary Party	2000–2003	58th Congress
2003	Alfredo Gómez Sánchez	Institutional Revolutionary Party	2003–2006	59th Congress
2006	Alejandro Olivares Monterrubio	Institutional Revolutionary Party	2006–2009	60th Congress
2009	Fernando Ferreyra Olivares	Institutional Revolutionary Party	2009–2012	61st Congress
2012	Tanya Rellstab Carreto	Institutional Revolutionary Party	2012–2015	62nd Congress
2015	Leydi Fabiola Leyva García	Institutional Revolutionary Party	2015–2018	63rd Congress
2018	Arturo Roberto Hernández Tapia	National Regeneration Movement	2018–2021	64th Congress
2021	Arturo Roberto Hernández Tapia	National Regeneration Movement	2021–2024	65th Congress
2024	Arturo Roberto Hernández Tapia	National Regeneration Movement	2024–2027	66th Congress

== Presidential elections ==
State of Mexico's 35th district
Election	District won by	Party or coalition	%
2018	Andrés Manuel López Obrador	Juntos Haremos Historia	52.4343
2024	Claudia Sheinbaum Pardo	Sigamos Haciendo Historia	58.2622
