= Zumpahuacán Municipality =

Coordinates: 18°50′24″N 99°34′48″W

Zumpahuacán
- Municipality
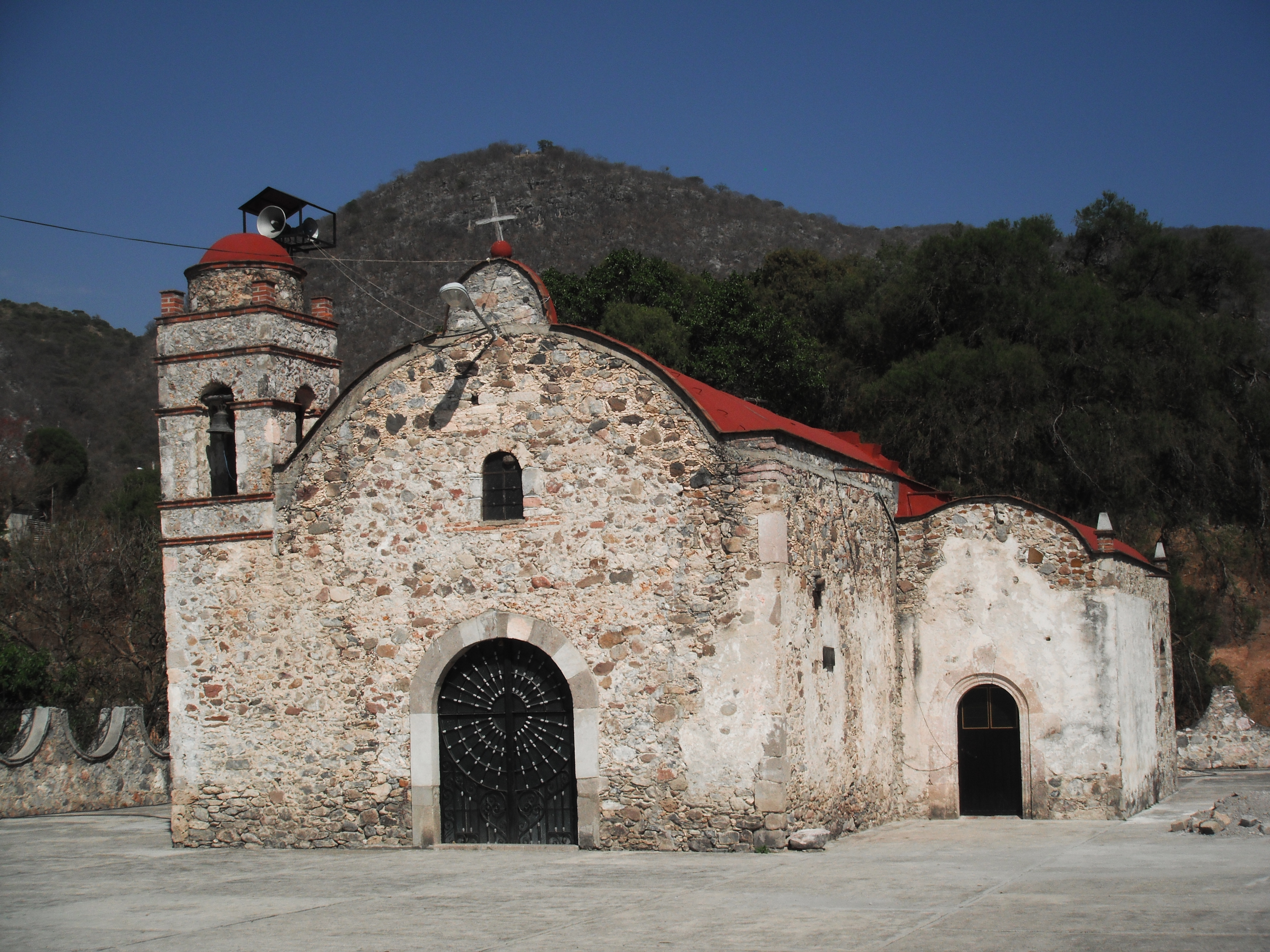
- Temple de San Mateo
- Interactive map of Zumpahuacán
- Country: Mexico
- State: Mexico State
- Municipal seat: Zumpahuacán
- Time zone: UTC-6 (CST)

Zumpuhuacán is a municipality in the State of Mexico. Its municipal seat is also called Zumpahuacán: The area was settled by Mexicas in 1220.

== Geography ==
It is located between the parallels 99° 27’ 51” and 99° 37’ 32” west longitude, and 18° 41’ 35” and 18° 55’ 22” north latitude. Zumpahuacán borders Tenancingo. It covers a total surface area of 201.54 km^{2} at an altitude of 6,634 ft. In the year 2005 census by INEGI, it reported a population of 16,149.

== Localities ==
As municipal seat, the town of Zumpahuacán is the government of the following surrounding communities: Ahuacatlán (Guadalupe Ahuacatlán), Ahuatzingo, Tlapizalco (Guadalupe Tlapizalco), Colonia Guadalupe Victoria, San Antonio Guadalupe (San Antonio), San Gaspar, San Pablo Tejalpa, Santa Cruz Atempa, Santa Cruz los Pilares (La Loma), El Tamarindo, San Pedro Guadalupe(Despoblado), Santa María la Asunción, El Zapote, Colonia San Nicolás Palo Dulce (Palo Dulce), Santa Ana Despoblado, Santa Catarina (Santa Catarina de la Cruz), Santiaguito, San José Tecontla, La Ascensión, San Juan, Paraje San Gabriel (San Miguel), Amolonca, Guadalupe Chiltamalco, Llano del Copal (La Muñeca), San Miguel Ateopa, La Cabecera, Barrio de Santa Ana, San Mateo Despoblado, and Chiapa San Isidro. The total population of the municipality was 16,149 people as of 2005. The municipality has a total area of 201.54 km2.

The original town of Quilocán lies 7 km from the municipal seat and remains an unexplored archeological site, although it has been subject to some looting in recent years.

Zumpahuacán lies on a volcanic axis and has a large number of mountains, valleys, hills and depressions. Three of the most notable elevations are: Totsquilla at 2,800 meters above sea level, Santiago or San Miguel at 2,780 meters and Tlalchichilpa at 2,100 meters. Most of these elevations are due to the region's past volcanic activity. It is also part of the Balsas River watershed, which contains a number of natural freshwater springs and seasonally flowing ravines.

Over 80% of the municipality's economic activity is based on agriculture.

== Economy ==
The economy is principally farming, cattle raising and small businesses, concentrating on the production of corn, beans and fruit. Tourists are attracted by its climate and some notable churches, as well as some ecotourism attractions. It has an unexplored archeological zone.
