= Rellstab =

Rellstab is a surname. Notable people with the name include:

- Johann Carl Friedrich Rellstab (1759–1813), German composer, writer, music publisher, and critic
- John Rellstab (1858–1930), United States federal judge
- Ludwig Rellstab (1799–1860), German poet and music critic
- Ludwig Rellstab (chess player) (1904–1983), German chess player
- Tanya Rellstab Carreto (born 1978), Mexican politician
