= Malinalco =

- Town & Municipality
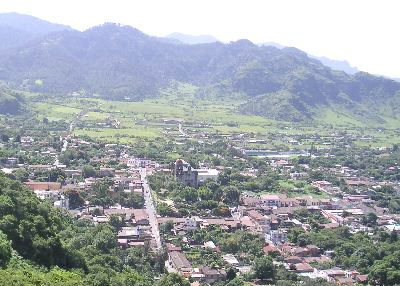
- Panoramic shot of the town

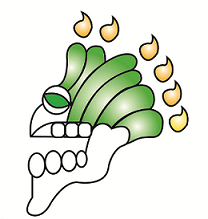
- Coat of arms

- Location within Mexico
- Coordinates: 18°56′54″N 99°29′41″W
- Country: Mexico
- State: State of Mexico
- Founded: 12th century
- Municipal Status: 1826

Government
  - Municipal President: Gerardo Baldemar Chaqueco
- Elevation (of seat): 1,740 m (5,710 ft)

Population (2005) Municipality
  - Municipality: 22,970
  - Seat: 6,523
- Time zone: UTC-6 (Central)
- Postal code (of seat): 52440
- Website: www.malinalco.gob.mx (in Spanish)

Malinalco (Spanish pronunciation: [maliˈnalko]) is the municipality inside of Ixtapan Region, is a town and municipality located 65 kilometers south of the city of Toluca in the south of the western portion of the State of Mexico. Malinalco is 115 km (71 mi) southwest of Mexico City.

Malinalco has always been associated with magic or sorcery due to the legend that it was the home of the goddess Malinalxochitl. The municipality is home to the famed village of Chalma, where according to legend, an image of a Black Christ miraculously appeared in a cave that was devoted to the god Oxtoteotl. It is the second-most visited shrine in Mexico, after the Basilica of Our Lady of Guadalupe.

The Aztecs conquered the area in the 1470s, and established a sanctuary for their military elite, the Eagle and Jaguar warriors. The complex was built on the Cerro de los Idolos (Hill of the Idols), over an older ceremonial site. The main attraction of this archeological site is the Cuauhcalli or House of Eagles, which is a building carved out of the side of the mountain.

The name Malinalco comes from the Nahuatl word malinalli, which is a kind of grass (Poaceae) called zacate del carbonero in Spanish, the word xóchitl, which means flower and co, which means place, which a translation of "where they worship the goddess Malinalxóchitl, the malinalli flower". The name also refers to one of the time periods on the Aztec calendar, marked by the malinalli plant, according to the Quauhtinchan Annals. In Aztec and early colonial times, the area was represented by a number of glyphs, often with elements of the malinalli plant and/or a human skull to indicate sacrifice.

Unlike most other municipalities in the state of Mexico, Malinalco does not use an Aztec glyph or coat of arms. Instead, it has a logo that was designed by Ernesto Romero Tetazin in 1985. It consists of the seal of the nation of Mexico, from which rises a figure that simulates a low mountain under a malinalli flower. This includes the motto "Your archeology is the perseverance of our race, culture and work" (Tu arqueología constancia de nuestra raza cultura y trabajo). To the left is the word Malinaltepetl.

== Geography ==
As municipal seat, the town of Malinalco is the governing authority over 54 other named communities, which covers an area of 186.28 km^{2}. The municipality, which shares its name with the seat, has a population of 22,970 of which only 6,523 live in the town of Malinalco. It has an average elevation of 1750 meters above sea level and is bordered by the municipalities of Joquicingo, Ocuilan, Zumpahuacán, Tenancingo and the state of Morelos. Malinalco is wedged between the Trans-Mexican Volcanic Belt and the Sierra Norte of the state of Morelos, Elevations are higher in the north with the highest being the Cerro de la Loma at approximating 2700 meters above sea level. The major river is the Chalma River, also called the Ocuilan River. Another river is the Colapa, which flows into the Chalma. There are also a number of fresh-water springs such as the San Miguel, Ateopa and Cuatzonco, most of which are the source of potable water for the communities of the municipality. The climate is warm but not hot with rains mostly in the summer. The landscape is bright green in the summer and a golden color in the winter. Average temperatures vary between 20C in the higher elevations to 35C in the lower ones. The higher elevations mostly have mixed pine forests, with more tropical vegetation in the lowlands. Wildlife includes deer, various small mammals, a number of reptile species and birds.

The San Miguel River is part of the Chalma-Malinalco sub-basin. It is an intermittent river and crosses the entire municipality, including the town itself. It has been used to dump trash so that the river produces disease, fetid odors and environmental damage. This has discouraged tourism to the town, and prevented the town from becoming a "Pueblo Mágico." Plans to rescue the river include reforestation around the river's source, improving drainage systems in Malinalco and other communities, eliminating liquid discharges into the river and better solid waste management in the municipality. A recycling facility has been built in Malinalco, in order to better handle the waste generated, sending less to the landfill.

=== Biodiversity ===
Malinalco has some of the widest biodiversity in Mexico. Its tropical deciduous, pine, and gallery forests accommodate a huge variety of flora and fauna. Dozens of mammals such as civet, armadillos, foxes, coyotes, squirrels and deer are common. Jaguars may live in the region, according to the UAEMEX. There are also many species of insects, crustaceans, birds, and edible mushrooms. There are very few dangerous animals, such as coral snakes, rattlesnakes, and scorpions. There are a number of myths that have demonized some animals like the scorpion vinagrillo or nana, the salamanquesca, a blue-tailed lizard, the Matip night and many others. The Living Museum "The Malinalco Bugs" and the turtle camp Mali-Xanat display some of the local species.

== History ==
According to mythology, the god Huitzilopochtli abandoned his sister Malinalxóchitl because she was practicing evil witchcraft. While she slept, he left her in the middle of the forest. When she woke, she was furious at having been abandoned by her brother. She gathered people loyal to her and marched off to settle in what is now Malinalco. Another version of the story has Malinalxóchitl as the leader of a dissident Mexica tribe, who left to settle in what is now Malinalco and intermarried with the people already there.

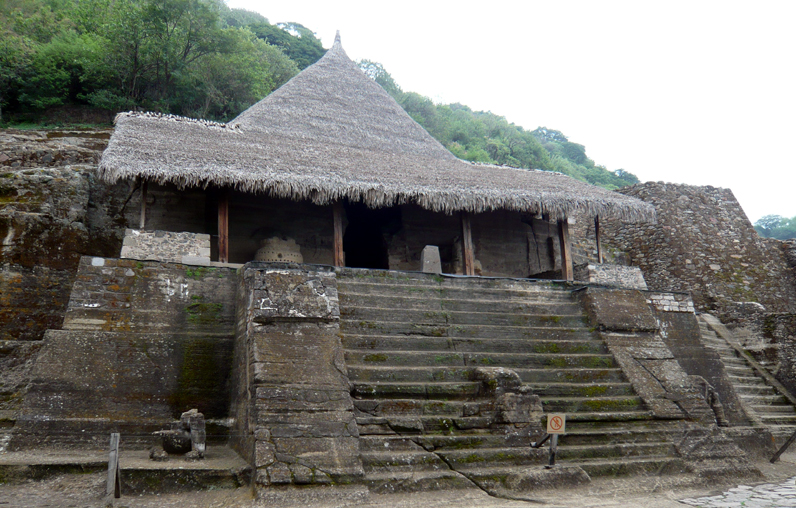
House of the Eagle warriors

Since far in the pre-Hispanic past, Malinalco was considered a magical place, filled with gods and sorcerers. The area shows influences from the Teotihuacan culture, the Toltecs, Matlatzincas and Aztecs, but little is known of the area's pre-Aztec history. Remains of an earlier ceremonial center exist at the summit of the Cerro de los Idolos (Hill of the Idols), but this center and its associated residential zones have not been excavated. The first settlements in this part of Mexico State date back to the early post-Classic and the beginning of the late post-Classic. This was a time when many populations were on the move in the highlands of Mexico, with new peoples moving south from what is now northern Mexico. The first people to arrive were probably the Culhuas, led by a chief named Cuauhtepexpetlatzin, after this group had already settled in the Valley of Mexico. Other peoples to arrive include the Matlazincas, the Ocuiltecos and the Otomi. Malinalco was a populous city-state that fought wars with Cuauhnahuac (Cuernavaca), and appears to have had commercial ties to the valleys of Mexico and Puebla-Tlaxcala.

By the time the Aztecs arrived, the area was dominated by the Matlazincas, who had settled earlier in the Toluca Valley by 8th century CE, then migrated. By the mid-15th century, the Aztecs and the Matlazincas had something of an understanding. However, in 1476, the Aztecs subjected this area to their empire under the rule of Axayacatl. While Axayacatl conquered this area, it was a successor, Ahuizotl who had most of the Aztec shrines, temples and other constructions built, including the fort and sanctuary for Aztec military elite. The purpose behind these buildings was to demonstrate the power of the ruling elite. The town was the capital of a tributary province that paid tribute in maguey mantas and grain, and was a source of stone for the Mexica.

When the Spanish arrived, the inhabitants of Malinalco resisted the conquistadors. Andrés de Tapia was in charge of subduing the populations of Malinalco and Ocuilán. Once this was achieved, the area was organized into encomiendas. Malinalco was first under the jurisdiction of Cristobál Rodriguez de Avalos and then the Spanish Crown itself.

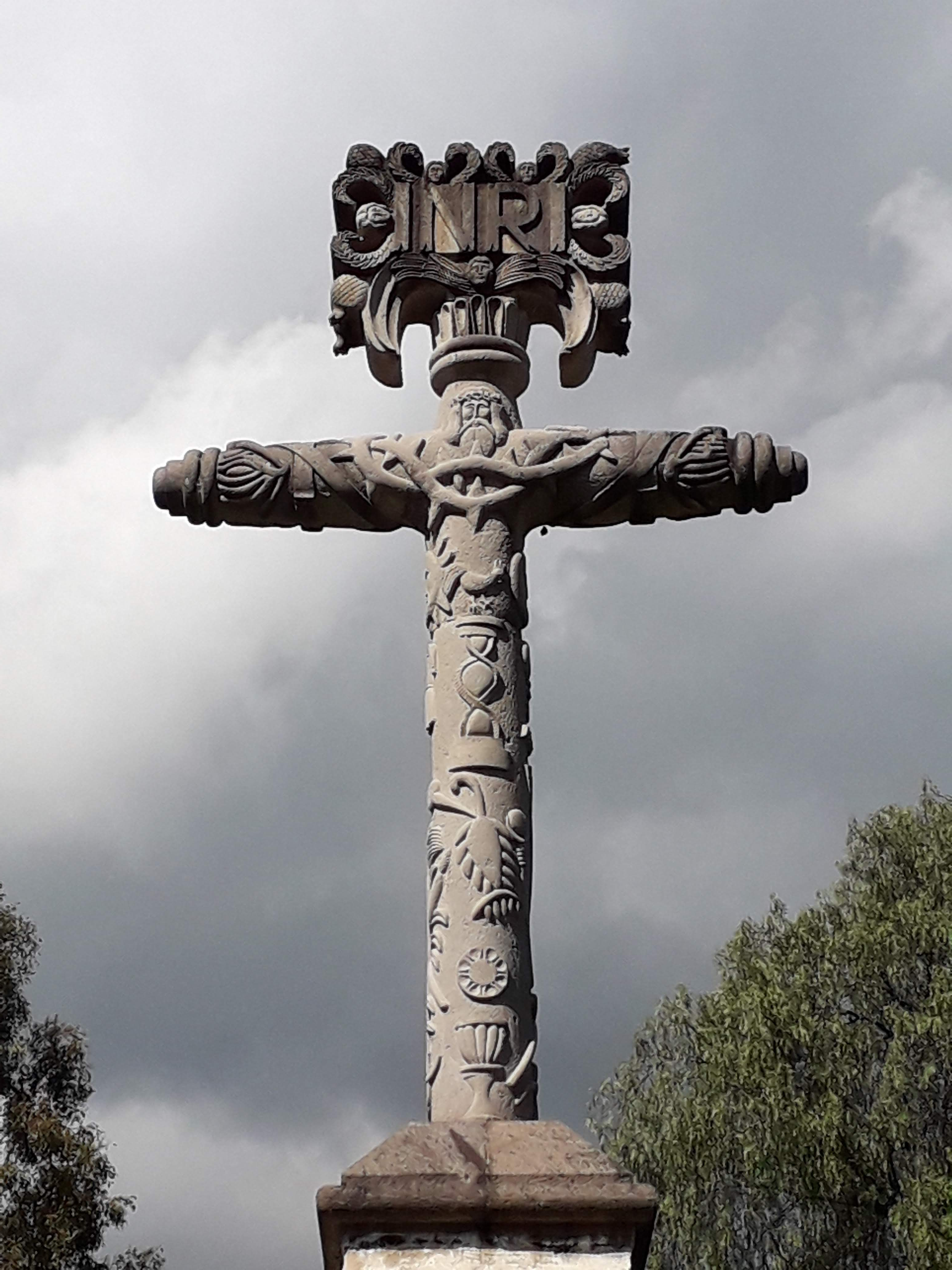
Cross outside of Divino Salvador

The Franciscans were the first to arrive and begin the evangelization process, followed by the Dominicans. However, it was the Augustinians who stayed and built the monastery from which evangelization would center. This monastery was originally called San Cristobál but later the named was changed to Divino Salvador. After the construction of the Temple of the Divino Salvador, neighborhood chapels were constructed in the various parts of town. It is likely that these chapels started out as simple thatched roof structures. During the colonial period, a communal water supply system was developed, taking advantage of the natural water flows in the box canyon that surrounds the town. The Jalmolonga Hacienda was one of the economic focuses of the area, which was part of the Rodriguez encomienda. Later, when the Jesuits came, they took over this hacienda, which was productive enough to support many of the expenses of the San Pedro and San Pablo College located in Mexico City. When the Jesuits were expelled in the 18th century, this land was eventually sold to the Count of Regla, Manuel Romero de Terreros.

During the Mexican War of Independence, José María Morelos y Pavon passed through in 1813, signing a document acknowledging the local indigenous laws regarding agricultural practices, and demanding the withdrawal of an ecclesiastical request to send money to Spain to fight the French. While Benito Juárez and the liberals won the Reform War in 1861 against the conservatives, conservatives in the Malinalco area continued to fight for a while from the mountains. When the Reform Laws were applied against the Monastery of the Divino Salvador, it continued to operate as a monastery for a while, although the state owned the land and buildings.

Due to its proximity to the state of Morelos, Malinalco was Zapatista territory during most of the Mexican Revolution. Malinalco put itself under the command of General Genovevo de la O starting in 1911. By 1913, Zapatistas and troops loyal to Venustiano Carranza both claimed this area. During the regime of Victoriano Huerta, Malinalco stayed loyal to the Zapatistas, despite government efforts to eradicate the rebels.

== Demography ==
=== Populated places in Malinalco ===
Populated places	Population
Total	25,624
Malinalco	8,045
San Simón el Alto	2,643
Chalma	1,827
San Andrés Nicolás Bravo	1,535
Jalmolonga	1,019

=== The town ===
Malinalco is set in a semi-enclosed valley, surrounded by cliffs. The houses are mostly made of adobe with red tile roofs, some of which are painted bright colors. Almost all the houses from the finest to the most humble have fruit trees in their yards, The streets are paved in cobblestones and on these donkeys can still be found hauling firewood and other burdens. Breads are often still baked in clay ovens that are heated with wood, and homemade pulque is often sold by street vendors. Malinalco's traditional culinary specialty is trout. This dish became popular with the many pilgrims who stayed while visiting the nearby shrine of Chalma. Many restaurants and street stands serve the fish in a variety of ways: wrapped in paper and steamed, fried, highly spiced or "a la diabla" and covered in garlic butter. Other well-known dishes include iguana, stewed rabbit and tamales make with frog and ajolote meat. The south of the municipality produces mezcal, while the north produces pulque.

The center of town has numerous icecream vendors, being one of the mot traditional ones " Nieves Malinali", offering typical region flavors such as, mexican vanilla, guanabana, beso de ángel, beso de cenicienta, lime, sapote, mamey and soursop sherbets.

Two km to the south of the city center is the El Molino trout farm, where you can choose your fish and have it prepared to order. Between the town of Malinalco and Chalma is another large trout farm and may be the only one in the world where trout are raised in cold mountains water under banana trees. A traditional drink to have with the meal is pineapple juice prepared with tequila, vodka or mezcal. Market day is Wednesday, when vendors come into town from the outlying villages to sell. This market sells regional produce, traditional food and wood crafted in different forms such as animals and musical instruments. Malinalco was named a Pueblo Mágico (Magic Town) by the state of Mexico.

At la Casa Mia, handcrafts, particularly alebrijes are for sale.

Tecorrales

Malinalco is characterized by a number of unique architectural elements that are in response to its being located in a tight canyon. Chief amongst them are the many dry stack stone walls that are located throughout the town. Known as tecorrales, these walls are widely recognized as a part of the history of Malinalco dating back to its prehispanic origins. The walls function in many ways that are beneficial, including erosion control and creating habitat for flora and fauna. The word tecorral is a portmanteau combing the Spanish word "corral" with the Nahuatl word "te". The prefix "te" conveys a range of ideas including place as well as evoking an essence, related to the word "teotl". It is this latter word conveying the sacred embodiment of place that makes the tecorrales in Malinalco so important to appreciating the long history of the region and its connection to Malinalxóchitl.

While the design and architecture of Malinalco continues to employ many distinctive vernacular walls including adobe and rocks, the historical presence of the original tecorrals give the city a distinctive quality. Unfortunately, due to natural erosion as well as changing attitudes about their significance, the remaining tecorrales are under threat and need better protection.

An important example of how the tecorrales remain an important aspect of local culture is the arts and community center El Tecorral that hosts diverse classes for both children and adults as well as a popular green market on Saturdays. Under the auspices of El Tecorral Los Angeles based artist Nick Herman along with local artist Bernardo Orihuela have begun the process of mapping the remaining tecorrales as a first step in their protection. It is hoped this becomes an ongoing project that links families within the pueblo to their important historical home.

== Economy ==
Despite being in one of Mexico's most populated regions, the municipality is still quite rural as it is located in an isolated valley, with farmland on the valley floor, and forests in the elevations. Most of the land in the municipality is used for forestry, followed by fish farming then agriculture. However, agriculture is the most important economic activity, harvesting corn, flowers and rice. There is some livestock but very little industry. Trout farming is also an important economic activity. Commerce centers on the needs of the local population and tourism in the case of the towns of Malinalco and Chalma. Sixty-three percent of the population makes its living through agriculture, livestock and trout-farming. A study done on peasant households in the municipality show that these families depend on multiple economic activities, including temporary migration to nearby cities or the United States.

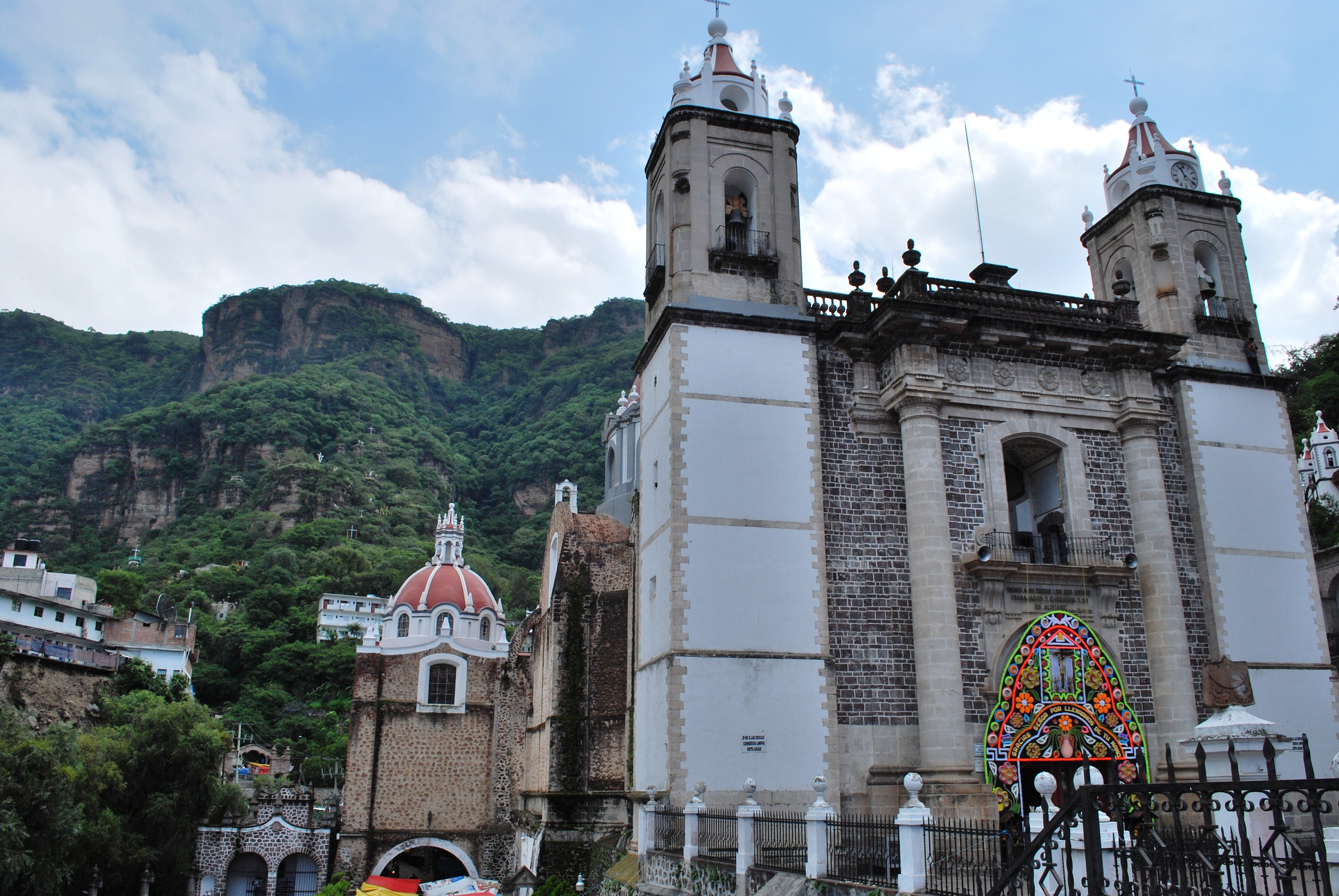
Sanctuary of the Lord of Chalma

The best-known community outside of the municipal seat is Chalma, which is famous for being the sanctuary of the Lord of Chalma, an apparition of a crucified black Christ. Its small population is almost entirely dedicated to meeting the needs of pilgrims who come throughout the year. According to legend, the Christ figure miraculously appeared at a cave where the pre-Hispanic local people used to worship a deity named Oxtoteotl. Pilgrimages to this Christian sanctuary follow many of the patterns of the old pagan rituals, including walking the narrow paths to the town itself, bathing in the waters of a special fresh-water spring and dancing at the sanctuary. Between Malinalco and Chalma there are large boulders, which according to legend, are people who have been turned to stone because they disobeyed this god. Near Chalma, because of the sanctuary, many famous people have bought ranches and other property. These include Verónica Castro, Daniela Romo, ex regent of Mexico City Oscar Espinoza Villareal and many politicians from Mexico State.

In addition to the Cerro de los Idolos, there are 35 archeological sites in the municipality including those found in Matlalac, Rincon de Techimalco, Rincon de San Miguel, Cerro Orquemil, Rincon del Pozo and others. These also include sites that contain cave paintings and petroglyphs, some of which are at least 2,000 years old. One of the best-known of these sites is Las Caritas, east of town on the other side of the highway. Here small faces are carved to the cave's rockface. Two other sites that contain small cave paintings are Los Diablitos and El Coyotito Rojo, both to the north of Malinalco proper.

== Communication and transport ==
The state ways cross by Malinalco, the first connect with Chalma to Tenango del Valle, the second connect Malinalco with Tenancingo. There is other municipal ways, connect Chalma with Miacatlán, in the state of Morelos. In Chalma there is a Bus terminal with connections to Mexico City, Toluca and Cuernavaca.

== Politics ==
Mayor	Time
Gerardo Baldemar Reynoso	2009–2012
Vidal Pérez Vargas	2012–2015
Gerardo Baldemar Chaqueco	2016–

== Culture ==
=== Monuments ===
- Sanctuary of the Lord of Chalma consists of the church, the 17th century ex-monastery, caves and lodgings on the ridges around the town. The lodgings are primarily used during feast days when the area is packed with pilgrims. A stucco gate marks the entrance to the sacred precinct. Here is a concrete plaza in front of the church where mariachi players wait for requests and pilgrims on their knees can be seen. The facade and the interior of the sanctuary church are of Neoclassic design as a result of the last round of modifications. The inscription on the portal of the church reads "Venid a mi todos los que estáis trabajados y cansados y yo os aliviaré" (Come to me all you who are working and tired and I will give you rest). The church is filled with a number of paintings and sculptures with religious themes, most done in the 18th century, but the three main attractions are the image of the Christ of Chalma image itself, a sculpture of the Archangel Michel and a painting of the Virgin of Guadalupe.(1408mexdes) Other notable paintings include scenes from the lives of Saint Augustine and Saint Nicolas Tolentino and one of the Passion of Christ. The image of the Christ of Chalma inside the church contains silver offerings placed in 1534 by silversmith Agustin Villaseñor.
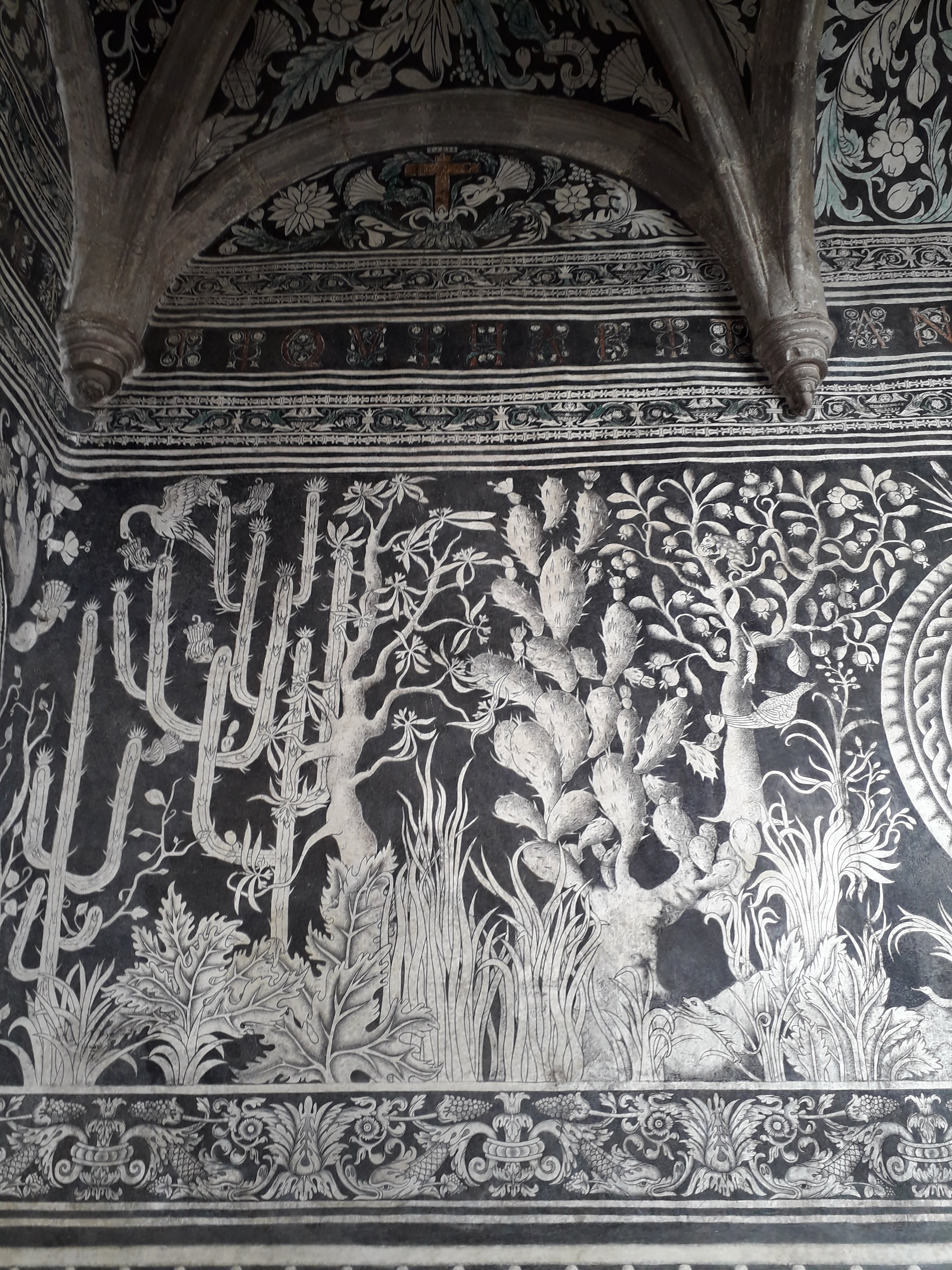
- Detail of Mural at Divino Salvador in Malinalco
  The major attraction is the Cuauhtinchan Archeological Zone, located just west of the town center on a hill called Cerro de los Idolos, which rises 215 meters above the town. On its sides are a number of pre-Hispanic structures built on terraces built into the hill. The main structures are at the top. This is one of the most important Aztec sites and was discovered in 1933, and explored by José Garía Payón in 1935. The visible complex dates from the Aztec Empire but the site’s use as a ceremonial center appears to be much older. The sanctuary complex was built from the mid 15th century to the beginnings of the 16th. To get to the Cerro de los Idolos one must climb 426 stairs up 125 meters. Along the stairway leading to the site, there are signs with area’s history written in Spanish, English and Nahuatl. The site contains six buildings. The Cuauhcalli or House of the Eagles, which dates from 1501, is the main building, which is significant in that it is carved out of the hill itself. The building is in the shape of a truncated pyramid, built this way due to the lack of space on the hill. The monolithic Cuauhcalli has been compared to the Ellora in India, Petra on the shores of the Dead Sea and Abu Simbel in Egypt. This was a sanctuary for the Eagle Warriors for rites such as initiation. A thirteen-step staircase leading into this temple is flanked by side struts. and two feline sculptures that face the plaza in front. The Cuauhcalli consists of two rooms, one rectangular and the other circular, with an opening in the wall between the two. After being carved out of the rock, the walls and ceiling were covered in stucco and painted with murals, most of which are almost completely gone. In the upper part, the entrance is symbolized by the open jaws of a serpent, complete with fangs, eyes and a forked tongue, which was painted red. This upper portion is covered by a thatched roof of the grass the area is named for.

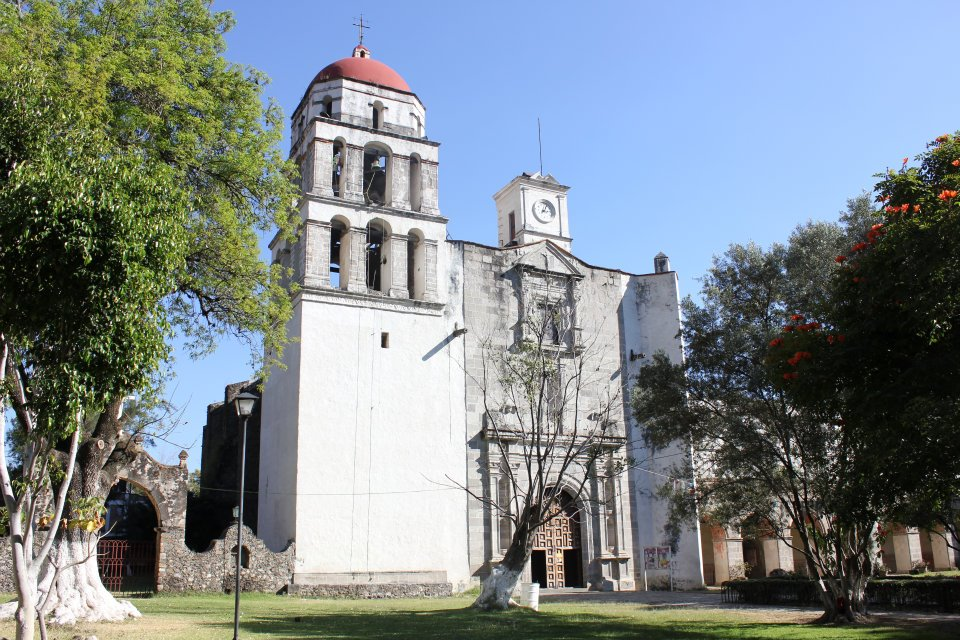
Exterior of the Temple and ex-monastery of the Divino Salvador

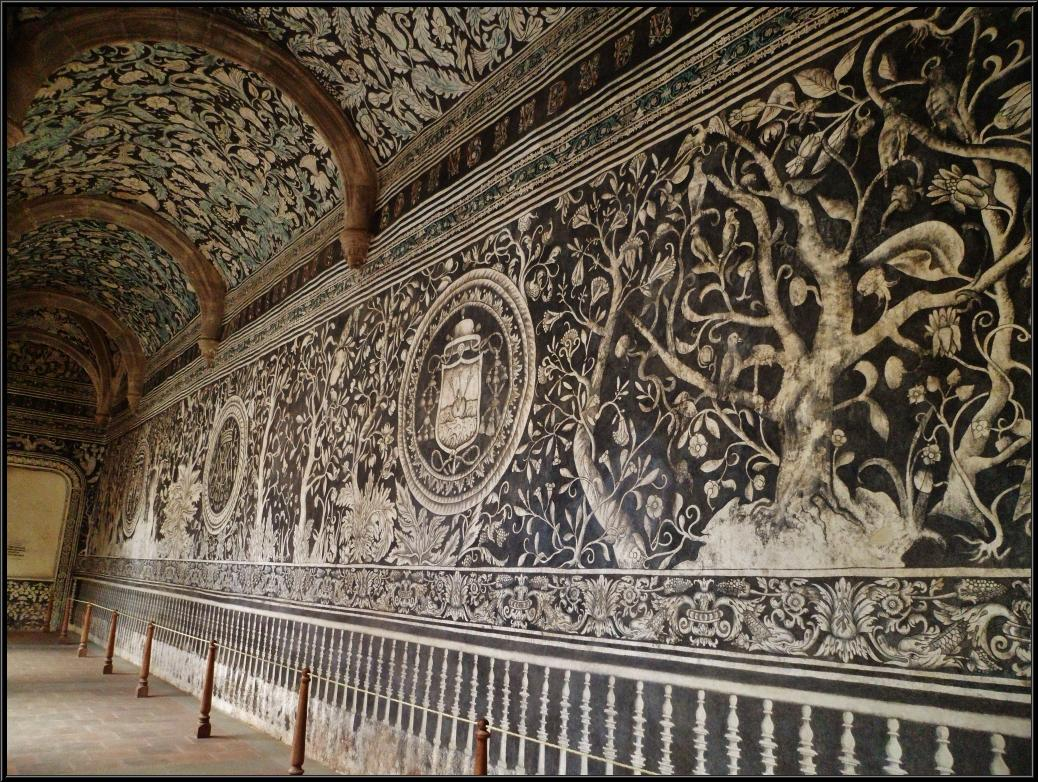
Section of the fresco depicting the regional flora and fauna as well as the emblems of Jesus Christ, the Virgin Mary and the Augustinians.

- The Temple and ex-monastery of the Divino Salvador was built between 1540 and 1560. This was an Augustine monastery, which was built to be the center of evangelization work in this area. It is located in the center of town and has a medieval look, with thick, coarse walls. The decoration is sober with square columns. The facade of the temple is a simple Plateresque and is quite high for a rural church. The Plateresque elements include angels, rose windows and the conch shell friezes. The interior of the monastery is covered in murals, which are the original from the 16th century, and is one of the earliest examples of mestizo art, done by indigenous artists. On the first level of the monastery, the murals depict the Garden of Eden story in an Aztec codex style. The atrium of the monastery maintains its original dimensions, and the courtyard is filled with medicinal and alimentary plants. Animals such as monkeys, iguanas and opossums can be found as well. From the courtyard lead remnants of the paths that led to processional chapels. At the south of the property, there are seven arches. Some experts claim this was an open air chapel but others state they were simply entrance arches. Local legend links these arches to the first seven Augustine friars to arrive to New Spain.

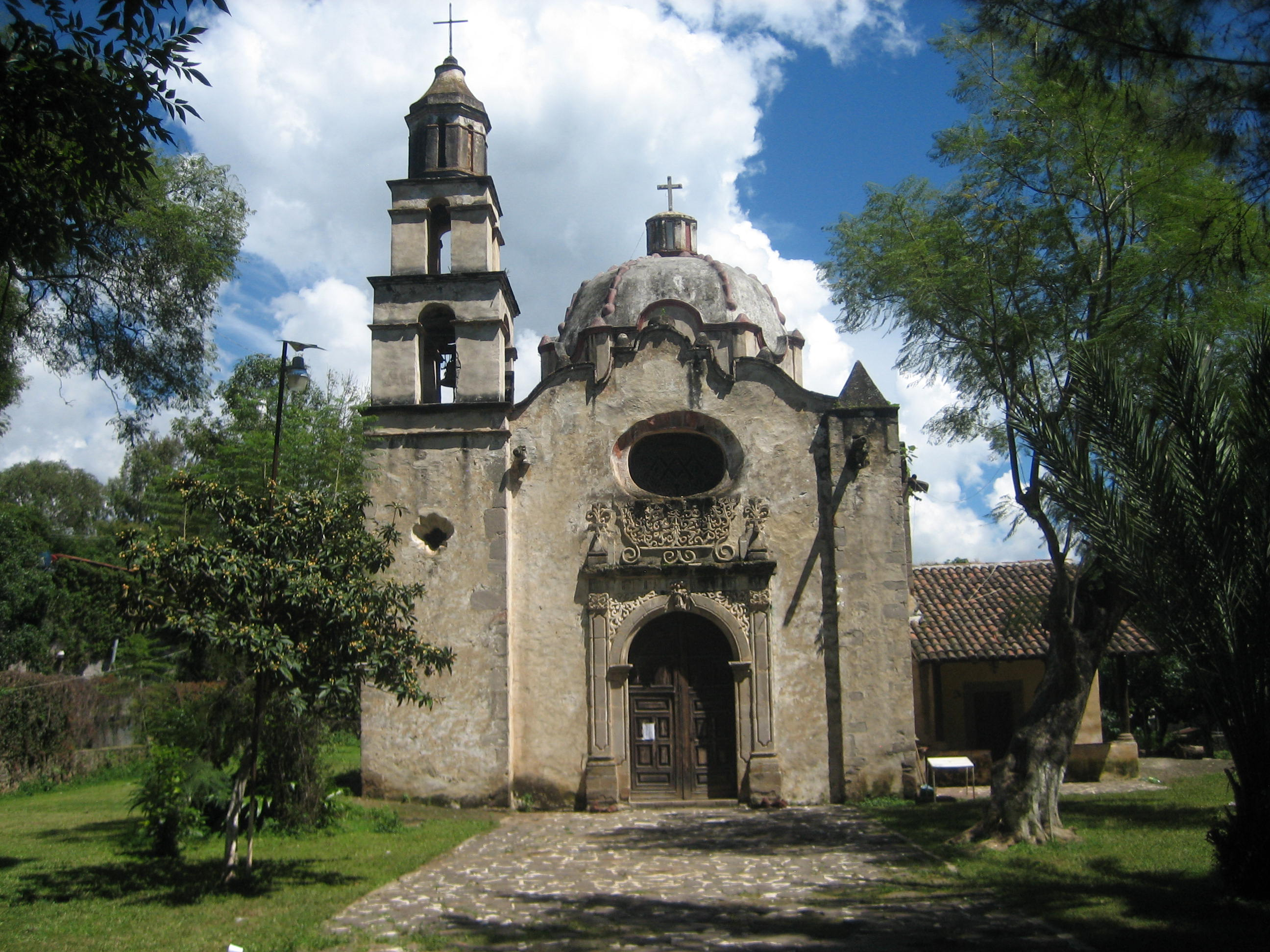
La Soledad church

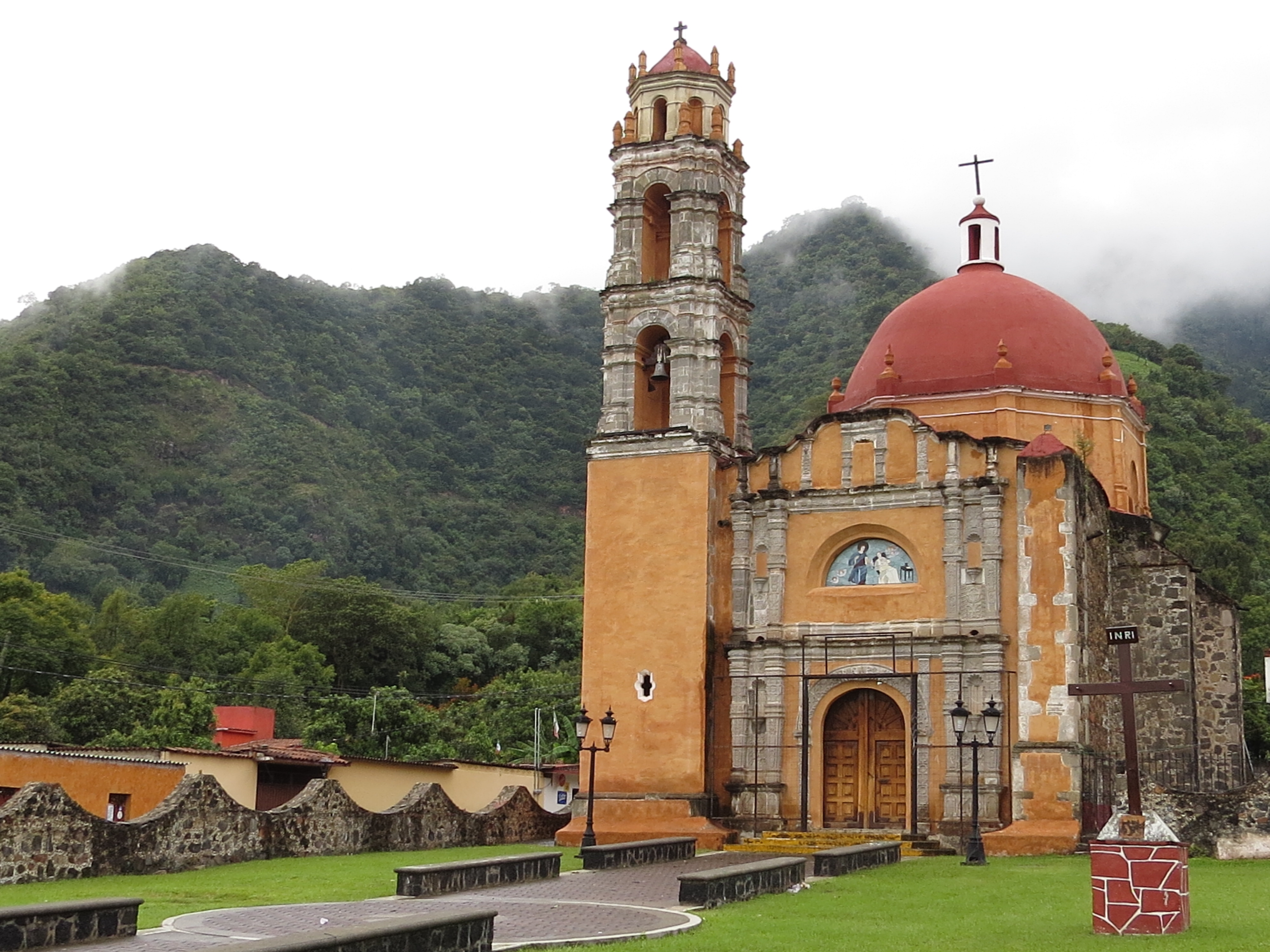
Templo de San Nicolás

- The Doctor Luis Mario Schneider University Museum is named after Luis Mario Schneider, an Argentine humanist and literary who was enamored by Malinalco and lived there for 30 years. He founded the museum, although it is the property of the Universidad Autónoma del Estado de México. It contains seven halls dealing with the geography, mythology and history of Malinalco and temporary exhibitions. The permanent collection is divided into exhibitions on festivals, the rainy season, the geological strata of the area, the underworld, the dry season and the House of the Eagle Warriors. The last is a reproduction of the main building of the Cerro de los Idolos, which is closed to visitors. The garden is a replica of that of the Cuauhcalli, which is also not open to visitors. The university opened a Department of Philology specializing in the history and criticism of Latin American literature. The department has a collection of 17,000 books, 3,000 magazines and 250 cases of documents for research and will have both graduate and undergraduate degree programs.
- The Casa de Cultura or Cultural Center is located in the center of town in front of the Municipal Palace. It is decorated with replicas of the murals found at the archeological zone and old photographs of native cultures. It also hosts dances, expositions and other cultural events.
- The Tlakuikani Gallery hosts expositions of contemporary arts done by artists from Malinalco and other parts of the State of Mexico. This gallery is located in the Barrio de Santa Maria Norte and specializes in the exposition and sale of oil paintings and wood carvings.

Outside of the center of town, there are many small neighborhoods, each having its own chapel. Most of these chapels were built between the 16th and the 17th centuries and many of these, such as those of Santa Maria, San Martin, San Guillermo, San Pedro, San Andres and La Soledad are considered to be works of art. For example, the chapel of San Juan has reliefs of Augustinian monks and the head of the encomendero of Malinalco, Cristobàl Romero. All of the chapels in the town face west with the exception of the Chapel of Santa Mónica. This one is dedicated to the mother of the founder of the order and faces the convent. Each one is unique in some way, and each has its own feast day. Most of these are located south of the town center following Benito Juarez Street out of town. Chapels include those of Santa María, San Martín, San Guillermo, San Pedro, San Andrés and the Virgin of Soledad. One to the north is the Chapel of San Juan, which has reliefs of Augustine friar Cristobal Romero. To the west is the Chapel of Santa Mónica, which has been quite altered in the last two centuries.

== Sports and entertainment ==
The first sport practiced in Malinalco was football. The town has a second division club named Colibríes de Malinalco. Swimming and basketball facilities are also available.

The hills of Malinalco are grazed by cows and sheep; the Spanish had very large haciendas and found it necessary to employ indigenous people as vaqueros or herdsman, who soon became experienced horsemen.

The area is popular with tourists, with several nightclubs and other venues popular on weekends.

== Notable people ==
- José Maria de Yermo y Parres, philosopher and Roman Catholic Saint, was born in Xalmolonga hacienda in Malinalco.
