= Alfredo Gómez =

Alfredo Gómez may refer to:

- Alfredo Gómez Urcuyo (born 1942), Nicaraguan politician
- Alfredo Gómez Sánchez (born 1968), Mexican politician
