= Tanya Rellstab Carreto =

Mexican politician

- Born: 26 June 1978 (age 48); Tenancingo, State of Mexico, Mexico
- Occupation: Politician
- Political party: PRI

Tanya Rellstab Carreto (born 26 June 1978) is a Mexican politician affiliated with the Institutional Revolutionary Party (PRI).

In the 2012 general election she was elected to the Chamber of Deputies to represent the State of Mexico's 35th district during the 62nd session of Congress. She had previously served in the 56th session of the Congress of the State of Mexico (2006–2009) and, from 2009 to 2012, she was the municipal president of Tenancingo, State of Mexico.
