= Alejandro Olivares =

Mexican politician

- Born: 26 February 1959 (age 67); State of Mexico, Mexico
- Occupation: Politician
- Political party: PRI

Alejandro Olivares Monterrubio (born 26 February 1959) is a Mexican politician affiliated with the Institutional Revolutionary Party (PRI). In the 2006 general election he was elected to the Chamber of Deputies to represent the State of Mexico's 35th district during the 60th session of Congress.
