= Fernando Ferreyra Olivares =

Mexican politician

- Born: 22 July 1963 (age 62); Xalatlaco, State of Mexico, Mexico
- Occupation: Politician
- Political party: PRI

Fernando Ferreyra Olivares (born 22 July 1963) is a Mexican politician from the Institutional Revolutionary Party (PRI).

From 2000 to 2003 he was the municipal president of Xalatlaco, State of Mexico, and from 2000 to 2003 he served as a local deputy in the Congress of the State of Mexico.

In the 2009 mid-terms he was elected to the Chamber of Deputies to represent the State of Mexico's 35th district during the 61st session of Congress (2009–2012).
