= Chalma, Malinalco =

Chalma
- Village
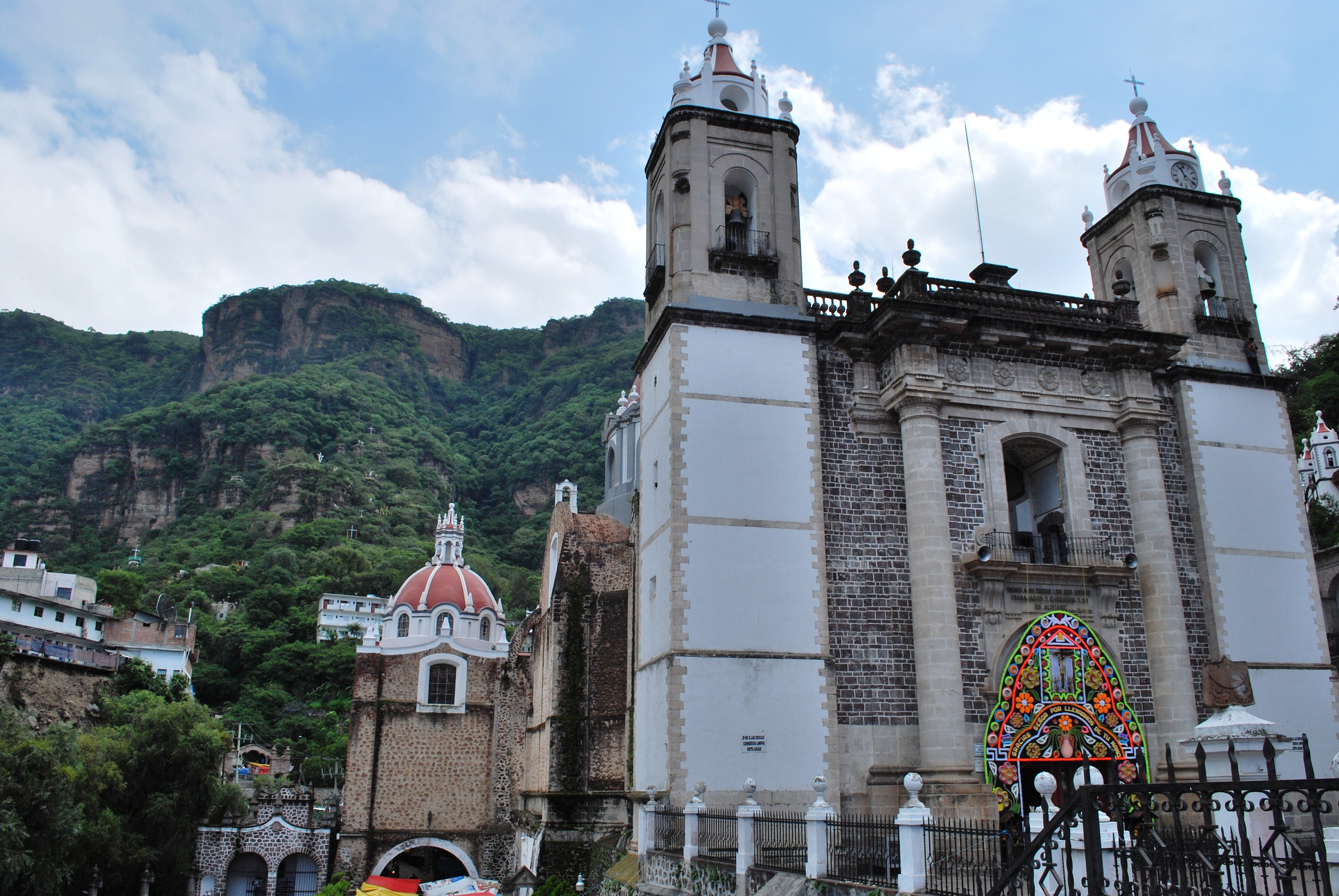
- Sanctuary of Chalma with cliffs in the background
- Interactive map of Chalma
- Coordinates: 18°55′56″N 99°26′09″W
- Country: Mexico
- State: State of Mexico
- Municipality: Malinalco, Mexico State
- Elevation (of seat): 1,700 m (5,600 ft)

Population (2005)
  - Total: 1,701
- Time zone: UTC-6 (CST)

Chalma is a small community, which is part of the municipality of Malinalco, Mexico State. Its small population is almost completely dedicated to the pilgrims who come to visit the Sanctuary of Chalma, the second most-important pilgrimage site in Mexico. The sanctuary is dedicated to an image of what many people describe as a "black Christ" on a cross that legend says miraculously appeared in an area cave where the worship of a deity commonly known as Oxtoteotl used to take place. Some contend that as Oxtoteotl is an aspect of Tezcatlipoca, the "Smoking Mirror," then the "black Christ" is really Tezcatlipoca, which the Spanish friars superimposed on the existing representation of Tezcatlipoca in order to convert the natives. Pilgrimages to this Christian sanctuary follow many of the patterns of the prehispanic rituals, including walking the narrow paths to the town itself, bathing in the waters of a special fresh-water spring and dancing at the sanctuary.

== Appearance of the Christ Image ==
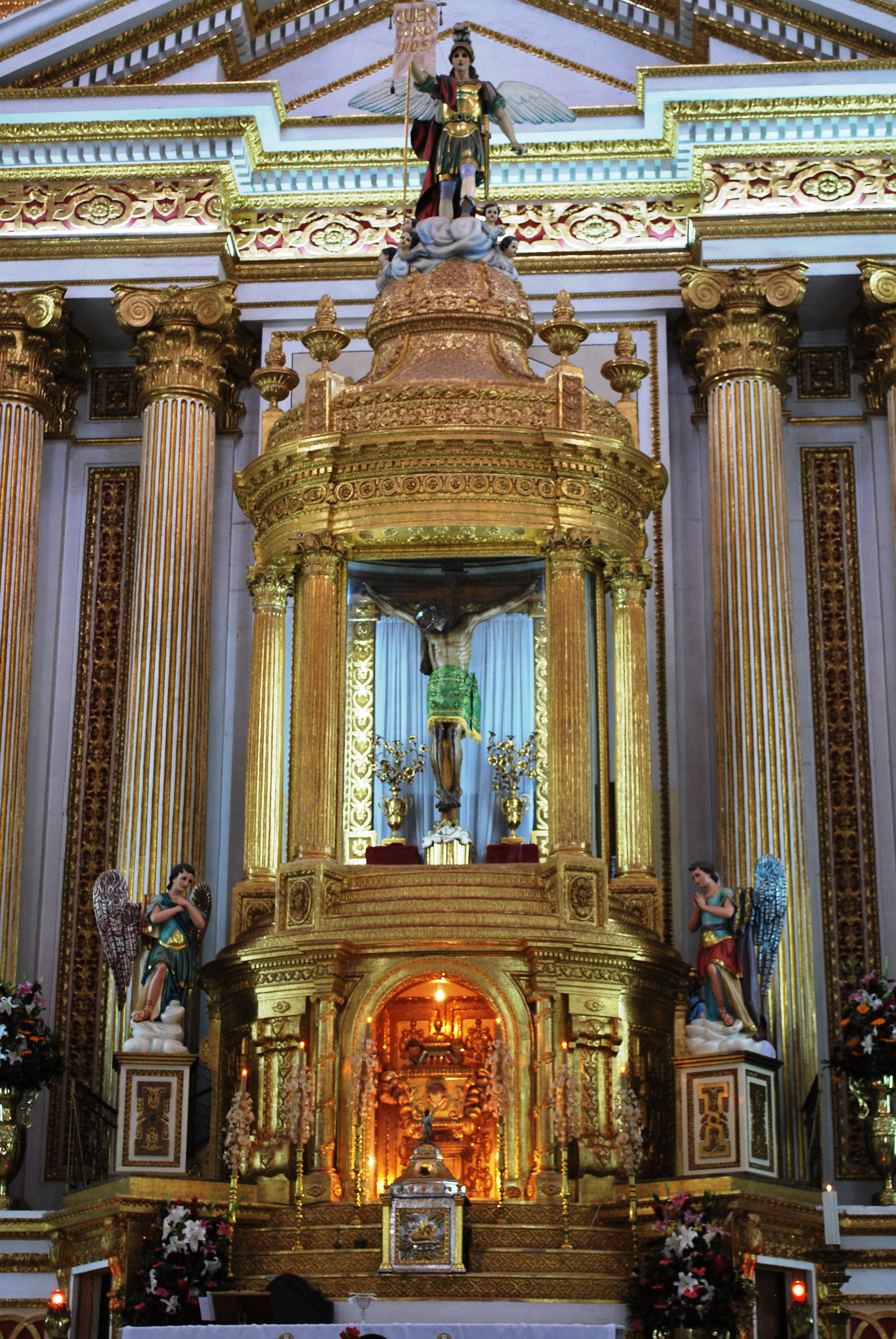
Main altar with image of the Christ of Chalma

Prior to the Conquest, the small caves in the Chalma area were thought to be holy, and all caves came under Tezcatlipoca, the "Smoking Mirror," the representative of the Mexica night. The aspect of Tezcatlipoca associated with caves was Oxtoteotl (also: Ostocteotl, Ostoteotl, Ostoctheotl) which has been translated as "the Dark Lord of the Cave," though there is little agreement on how to translate this term. Francisco de Florencia, in his 1689 chronicle of the place (the earliest written source available on the subject) suggested the name Ostoc Teotl, but also said that his indigenous sources were unsure of the identity of the deity. In one of the caves, it was said to be a large, man-sized, black, cylindrical idol of Oxtoteotl with reputed magical and healing powers. Oxtoteotl was a god of human destiny or of night, sometimes appearing as a jaguar or with the god of war, depending on different oral traditions. Those who made pilgrimage to the deity walked for days in the surrounding mountains, wearing flowers and carrying incense burners. After arriving to the site, they bathed in the nearby river fed by a sacred spring and drank holy water before entering the cave. There were also signs that worship of this deity included human sacrifice.

In approximately 1537, Augustinians, including Brothers Sebastian de Tolentino and Nicolas Perea came to evangelize the Malinalco region of which Chalma is part. From there, the story has a number of versions. Most state that after learning about and perhaps seeing the rites associated with the worship of Oxtoteotl, Tolentino and Perea worked to evangelize here, urging the local people to destroy the idol. Then, three days later, the friars returned to destroy the idol themselves, but instead found a life-sized image of a crucified Christ in the space that the idol was, made of the same material as the idol, but the idol was found in pieces on the ground which was previously occupied. Upon seeing the image, the indigenous people are said to have fallen down in "apostolic piety", which allowed for the conversion of the people of this area.

A less-popular version of the story states that a muleteer was looking for one of his animals when he found the Black Christ in one of the caves.

The cave in which the Christ image was found became a very popular Christian pilgrimage site starting from the 16th century. In 1643, a primitive church was constructed in a nearby plain. The Augustinian order administered the cult and chapel for many years, before deciding to construct a monastery and buildings to house the pilgrims who came to worship. By the end of the Colonial period, the complex was known as the Royal Convent and Sanctuary of Our Lord Jesus Christ and Saint Michael of the Caves of Chalma.

At many indigenous shrines in Mexico, the previous sacred images were replaced with Christian ones, occasionally made of a corn paste called "tatzingueni" using a technique developed by Vasco de Quiroga, and a number of these figures still exist. After the supposed appearance of the Black Christ figure, the Augustinian friars proclaimed a miracle had occurred in the cave, word of which spread and even included the idea that the area had been freed of predatory animals.

== The sanctuary complex ==
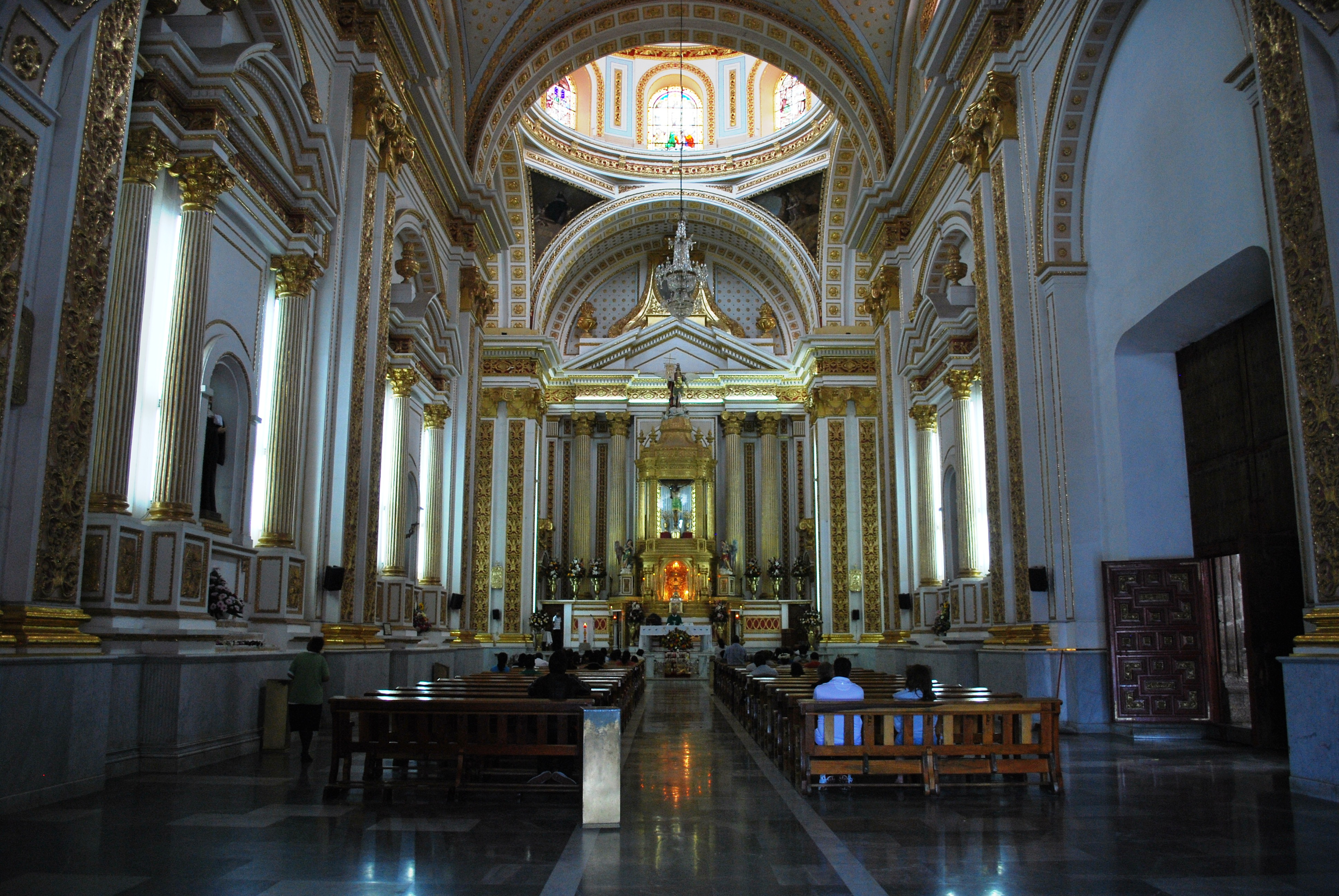
Nave of the sanctuary church

The veneration of the black Christ of Chalma continued to be performed in the cave where it was found until 1683, when the Augustinian Brothers Bartolome de Jesus Maria and Juan de San Jose founded a monastery at the cave site to attend to the many pilgrims. The image was brought to a church built especially for it on the canyon floor below the cave in which it was found, becoming the first sanctuary of Chalma. This sanctuary has been rebuilt and remodeled a number of times, with the most significant rebuildings in 1721 by Brother Diego Velazquez de la Cadena, and in 1830. The sanctuary's official name is "El Convento Real y Sanctuaria de Nuestro Señor Jesus Christo y San Miguel de los Cuevas de Chalma" (The Royal Monastery and Sanctuary of Our Lord Jesus Christ and Saint Michael of the Caves of Chalma) authorized by Charles III of Spain in 1783 and was put directly under his protection.

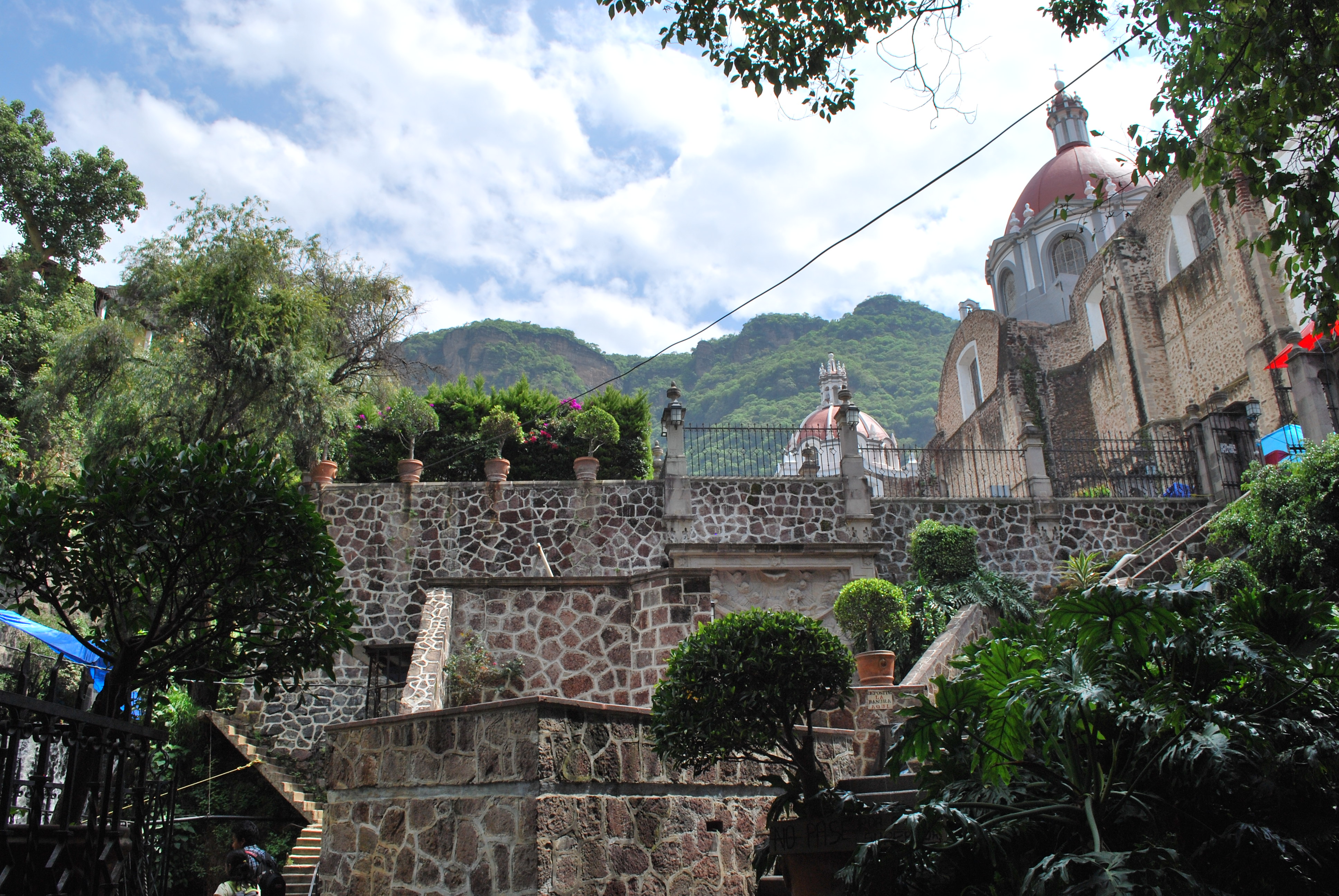
View of part of sanctuary from just below the Plaza of the Dancers

The sanctuary consists of the church, the 17th century ex-monastery, caves and lodgings on the ridges around the town. The lodgings are primarily used during feast days when the area is packed with pilgrims. A stucco gate marks the entrance to the sacred precinct. Here is a concrete plaza in front of the church where mariachi players wait for requests and pilgrims on their knees can be seen. The facade and the interior of the sanctuary church are of Neoclassic design as a result of the last round of modifications. The inscription on the portal of the church reads "Venid a mi todos los que estáis trabajados y cansados y yo os aliviaré" (Come to me all you who are working and tired and I will give you rest). The church is filled with a number of paintings and sculptures with religious themes, most done in the 18th century, but the three main attractions are the image of the Christ of Chalma image itself, a sculpture of the Archangel Michel and a painting of the Virgin of Guadalupe.(1408mexdes) Other notable paintings include scenes from the lives of Saint Augustine and Saint Nicolas Tolentino and one of the Passion of Christ. The image of the Christ of Chalma inside the church contains silver offerings placed in 1534 by silversmith Agustin Villaseñor. However, it is not the original image that was supposedly found in the cave above. That image was destroyed by a fire in the 18th century, and the one that exists today is a recreation using what remained of the original after the fire. The altar is made of wood, painted in plateresque style, with an image of the Christ of Chalma in wood occupying the central space. A relatively recent cult has grown up around the "Santo Niño del Consuelo" (Holy Child of Solace), which is an image probably created by a sculptor named Solache. For feast days such as Christmas and Epiphany, this image receives offerings of toys. Outside the church, on the path to the river is a space dedicated to the display of the folk paintings (called "retablos"), photos, locks of hair and other tributes left in gratitude for miracles granted by the Christ of Chalma.

The church of this sanctuary is one of the most crowded in the country year-round, attracting thousands of pilgrims who come because of the many miracles that have been attributed to the Christ of Chalma.

== Pilgrimage to the sanctuary ==
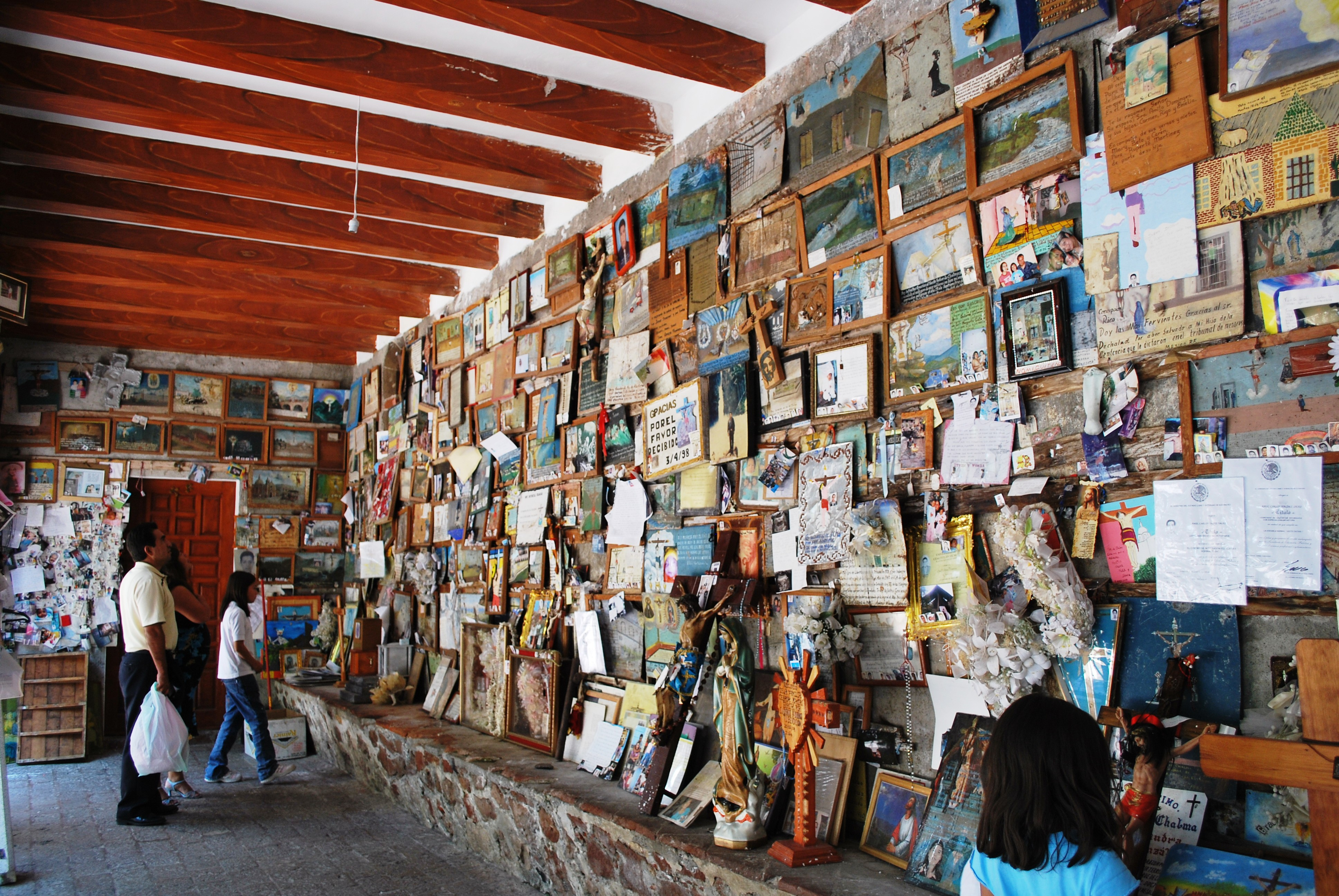
Display area of "retablos" and other gifts left in appreciation of miracles received.

The Sanctuary of Chalma is one of the most-visited pilgrimage sites in Mexico, only second behind the Basilica of Our Lady of Guadalupe. In fact, since the Christ image appeared ten years after the Virgin of Guadalupe, some consider her to be the "mother" of this particular Christ figure. According to the Secretary of Tourism for Mexico State, more than two million people a year visit Chalma. Most visitors come from the Mexican states of Querétaro, Michoacán, Oaxaca, Guerrero and the Huasteca region in San Luis Potosí and Veracruz; however, it also has received pilgrims from all over the world.

Most pilgrimages to Chalma are communal in nature with different towns and villages in central Mexico having traditional days to visit the site. Most of these pilgrimages are for the blessing of the local patron saint or to commemorate the change of "mayordomo", a kind of lay religious leader in charge of a community's religious traditions.

From near or far, most communal pilgrimages are well-organized, such as the "Procession of Silence" that originates in Toluca. These pilgrimages can be planned a month in advance, with the mayordomo leading the organizational effort. Some parishes have tee shirts and special clothing produced for the pilgrimage, and others arrange to have colorfully decorated trucks to follow walking pilgrims for support functions. Before departure, all meet at a certain point in their hometowns. In the past, the pilgrimage from more local areas was done entirely by foot. Sometimes it is still done this way, but more often the trek is combined with motorized transport. Some others still have turned to bicycles as a means of transporting themselves to the site.

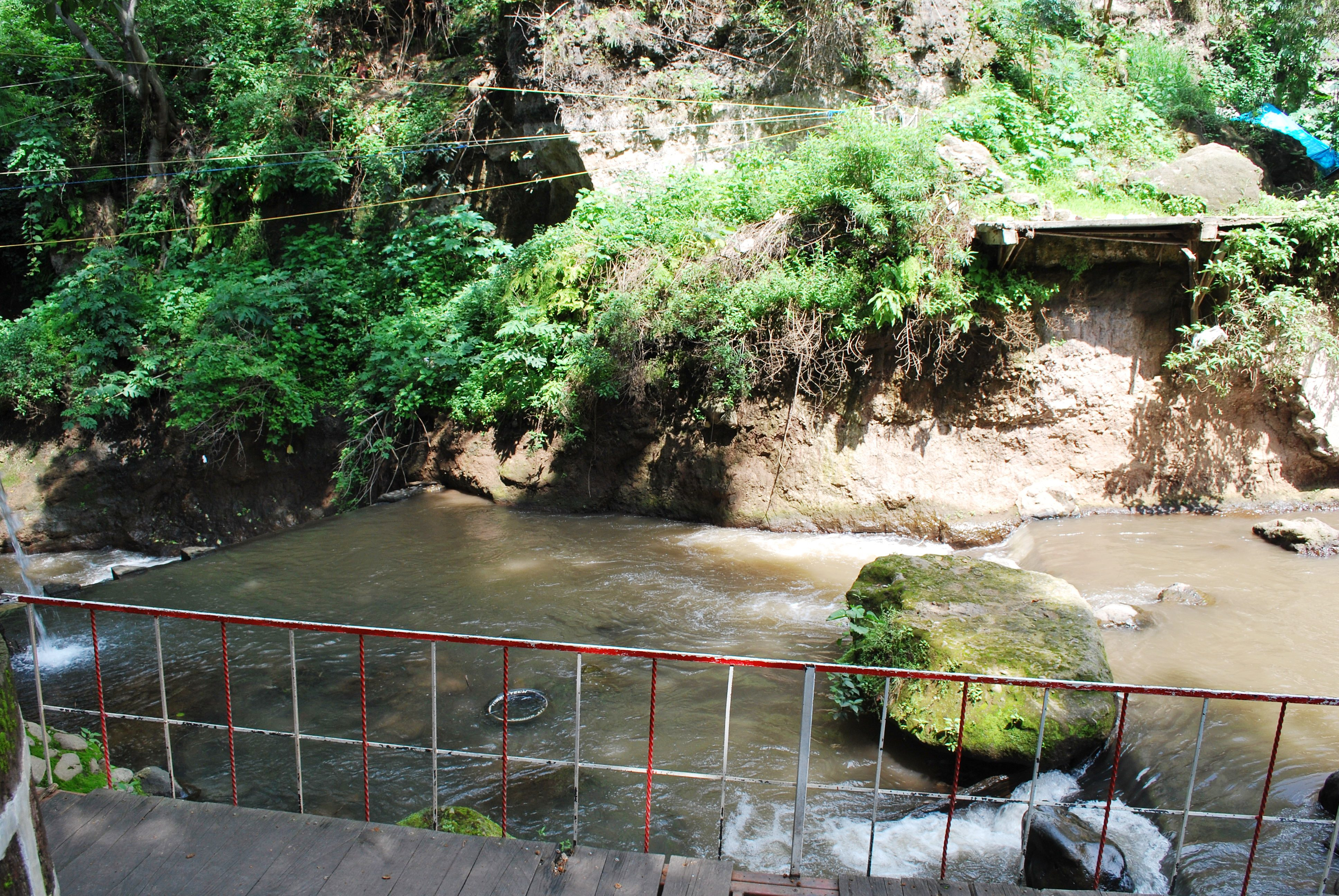
The La Escondida or Chalma river as it passes by the sanctuary

Whether they use other means to get to the Chalma area, modern pilgrims still follow the same narrow steep paths to the site that their ancestors used to get to the cave of Oxtoteotl and wearing flowers as they did. If the walk is done at night, pilgrims carry torches and candles. Before the 1970s the trip from the main highway to the village of Chalma could take eight hours or more by foot. Although there is now a paved road to the village, it is very winding through the rugged terrain. On the way, there are lodgings, some in private homes, for traveling pilgrims. Once arrived at the sanctuary, most pilgrims follow a number of traditional activities. One of the main purposes is to dance in the sanctuary complex. Traditional dances from all over Mexico are performed at this sanctuary, with some pilgrims dressed in the traditional clothing of their region. This dancing in honor of the Christ of Chalma is believed to cleanse sins. This ritual is so famous that in Mexico, there is a saying that when one asks for something impossible, they cannot perform the deed "without going to dance at Chalma". For many pilgrims, it is also important to visit a large, centuries-old Mexican cypress tree, next to which is a spring that emerges from the earth here. These are the same waters that pagan ancestors bathed in before the arrival of Christianity. For first-time pilgrims this visit is essential. The waters of the spring are claimed to have miraculous properties according to popular belief. First-time pilgrims must circle the tree three times. Many pilgrims ritually bathe themselves in these waters, and once clean, they are crowned with flowers to be ready to enter the sanctuary. Some people believe that not doing the ritual of the tree and spring will turn one into stone.

On the tree, some pilgrims hang a small bag with newborn baby's umbilical cord to give thanks for the birth and others hang notes and other items reflecting their petitions and prayers. Some women will place their hands in a hole in the tree where water comes out and place the water on their bodies for fertility.

Inside the sanctuary itself, first-timers will have a sponsor (called a "padrino") who presents the pilgrim to the image. Those who come bearing sacred images from their hometowns place them near the main altar of the church where mayordomos, or lay religious leaders will guard them for the duration, which can be up to one week. The most important ritual in the sanctuary is to approach the Christ image in the church, often on knees and kissing the protruded foot. Some leave votive offerings as well. When departing the sacred precinct, some walk backwards to the stucco gate, turning around after exiting.

Mass pilgrimages occur during the first Friday of Lent, Holy Week and Pentecost as these dates are the most closely associated with the death of Christ. In addition, 1 July is the feast day of the Christ of Chalma. On these special days, as many as 50,000 pilgrims may arrive in Chalma.

Such large numbers of visitors in a tiny town has caused problems. One recurring problem is with sanitation, and some poor pilgrims find the trip very expensive as food and lodging prices rise with the demand. This is especially true with fish meals during Lent. The most serious problem occurred in 1991 during Holy Week, when twenty people died and forty were injured when crowds pushed to gain access to the atrium of the sanctuary church. Most of the dead and injured were trampled. Today, a large number of security forces are present in Chalma during these times to prevent a repeat incident, as well as helicopters and ambulances to give medical attention to pilgrims.

Many Mexican Catholics believe that 3 visits to Chalma are needed for petitions to the Christ here to be heard.

== The town of Chalma ==
Chalma is a small community of 1701 people (as of the 2005 census), which is part of the municipality of Malinalco. It lies eleven km east of the municipal seat of Malinalco, 65 km from the state capital of Toluca and 95 km from Mexico City. The town is surrounded the dense vegetation, mountains, cliffs, glens, fresh-water springs and Chalma and Tlaxipehualco rivers. A number of these hills and cliffs are dotted with crosses, with some over 7 meters in height. These crosses supposedly scare evil spirits. Each cross belongs to a specific group of worshippers who take the crosses down to the sanctuary every year to paint and adorn them. Then they are taken back up to their place on the mountain side, and the ritual ends with singing and dancing, guarding the cross all night. In addition to the Sanctuary of Chalma, there are two other attractions in the small town. The first is the Agua de Vida (Water of Life) Park, built by the State of Mexico and intended to be a kind of prelude to the sanctuary itself. Next to the park are caves dedicated to God the Father, God the Son and the Holy Spirit. The Plaza de los Peregrinos (Plaza of the Pilgrims), was constructed with various levels, stairs, arches, terraces, a place to pray with the purpose of giving pilgrims a place to rest. Cultural and religious activities also take place here. It also features a mural in relief with religious themes. Festival days in the community of Chalma are distinguished by the construction of large panels decorated with colorful flowers and seeds. Local inhabitants make arches from tissue or crepe paper to decorate atriums, squares and streets. Almost all of Chalma's small population makes its living from the pilgrimages, with the street leading to sanctuary completely filled with shops and street vendors, with no vehicular traffic allowed. Most of these vendors sell religious trinkets, plastic bottles for the spring water, and traditional Mexican cuisine.
