= Alfredo Gómez Sánchez =

Mexican politician

- Born: 7 March 1968 (age 58); Tenango del Valle, State of Mexico, Mexico
- Occupation: Politician
- Political party: PRI

Alfredo Gómez Sánchez (born 7 March 1968) is a Mexican politician affiliated with the Institutional Revolutionary Party (PRI). In the 2003 mid-terms he was elected to the Chamber of Deputies to represent the State of Mexico's 35th district during the 59th session of Congress.
