= Zumpahuacán =

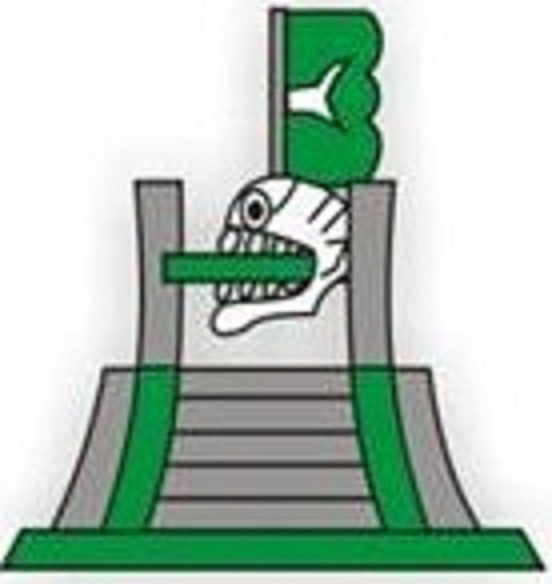
- Coat of arms

- Location within Mexico
- Coordinates: 18°50′11″N 99°34′43″W
- Country: Mexico
- State: Mexico State
- Municipality: Zumpahuacán Municipality

Government
  - Municipal President: Francisca Reina Jímenez Carrillo (2006–2009)
- Elevation: 1,660 m (5,450 ft)
- Time zone: UTC-6 (Central (US Central))

Zumpahuacán is the municipal seat of Zumpahuacán Municipality.

It is a town in the State of Mexico. The name "Zumpahuacán" comes from the Nahuatl "Tzompanhuahcān", which means "place of coral trees" (Erythrina coralloides). Another possible translation could be "place of the skulls of the sacrificed". The main welcome sign as you enter the municipality uses this latter interpretation.

== The town ==
Archeological, anthropological and linguistic studies date human habitation in the area to at least 8000 BCE with the peoples here having cultural and linguistic links to cultures in what is now the state of Oaxaca and later, with cultures of the high central plains of Mexico. The original village was founded in what is now called Pueblo Viejo ("old village") or San Juan Viejo in Spanish and Quilocán ("place of edible herbs") in a flat area surrounded by rocky cliffs and near the Temozolapa River, seven km from the modern village. It is believed that this settlement was founded by the Mexicas or Chichimecas, who were joined by Matlatzincas around 1300 to 1400 CE. The area was conquered and incorporated into the Aztec Empire under the rule of Axayacatl between 1464 and 1467.

The modern town was founded in 1550 when the village of Quilocán was moved to this location and renamed "San Juan Viejo" to evangelize the population under the rule of Alonso de la Serna. In 1565, under the supervision of Pedro Ponce de León constructed the parish church. Pedro Ponce de León may have been the grandson of Cuatlatlapatzin of Tlaxcala. The name was changed to Zumpahuacán in 1689 when authorities bowed to public pressure after a considerable redistribution of lands in the area. The town suffered an epidemic of smallpox in 1841 and cholera in 1850. Cholera almost wiped out the entire population. Zumpahuacán belonged to the municipality of Malinalco until 1861, became part of Tenancingo. in 1875, the town separated into its city with Lucio Manuel Peña as the first municipal president.

On 2 February 1894, Felipe Castañeda G. was executed by firing squad in the town. Though not famous for his acts, he was responsible for the "Proclamation of Zumpahuacán", which was a precursor to the Mexican Revolution. This document was one of the first to disavow the government of Porfirio Díaz, with the town later siding with the Liberation Army of the South.

As of the 2005 INEGI census, the town had a population of 4,232 people.

== The municipality ==
As municipal seat, the town of Zumpahuacán is the government of the following surrounding communities: Ahuacatlán (Guadalupe Ahuacatlán), Ahuatzingo, Tlapizalco (Guadalupe Tlapizalco), Colonia Guadalupe Victoria, San Antonio Guadalupe (San Antonio), San Gaspar, San Pablo Tejalpa, Santa Cruz Atempa, Santa Cruz los Pilares (La Loma), El Tamarindo, San Pedro Guadalupe (Despoblado), Santa María la Asunción, El Zapote, Colonia San Nicolás Palo Dulce (Palo Dulce), Santa Ana Despoblado, Santa Catarina (Santa Catarina de la Cruz), Santiaguito, San José Tecontla, La Ascensión, San Juan, Paraje San Gabriel (San Miguel), Amolonca, Guadalupe Chiltamalco, Llano del Copal (La Muñeca), San Miguel Ateopa, La Cabecera, Barrio de Santa Ana, San Mateo Despoblado, and Chiapa San Isidro. The total population of the municipality was 16,149 people as of 2005. The municipality has a total area of 201.54 km^{2} (77.82 sq mi).

The original town of Quilocán lies 7 km from the municipal seat and remains an unexplored archeological site, although it has been subject to some looting in recent years.

Zumpahuacán lies on a volcanic axis and has a large number of mountains, valleys, hills and depressions. Three of the most notable elevations are: Totsquilla at 2,800 meters above sea level, Santiago or San Miguel at 2,780 meters and Tlalchichilpa at 2,100 meters. Most of these elevations are due to the region's past volcanic activity. It is also part of the Balsas River watershed, which contains a number of natural freshwater springs and seasonally flowing ravines.

Over 80% of the municipality's economic activity is based on agriculture.
