= Tenancingo, State of Mexico =

Tenancingo
- Municipality
- Hill of the Three Marias

- Coat of arms

- Location within State of Mexico Location within Mexico
- Coordinates: 18°57′39″N 99°35′26″W
- Country: Mexico
- State: State of Mexico
- Municipal seat: Tenancingo de Degollado
- Founded: 1551
- Municipal Status: 1825

Government
  - Municipal President: Nancy Nápoles (2025–2027)

Area
  - Municipality: 258.74 km^{2} (99.90 sq mi)
- Elevation (of seat): 2,020 m (6,630 ft)

Population (2020) Municipality
  - Municipality: 104,677
  - Density: 404.56/km^{2} (1,047.8/sq mi)
  - Seat: 14,174
- Time zone: UTC-6 (Zona Centro)
- Postal code: 52400
- Website: (in Spanish) tenancingo.gob.mx

Tenancingo is one of 125 municipalities in the State of Mexico, Mexico. The municipal seat is the town of Tenancingo de Degollado. The municipality is located in the south of the state, in the Tenancingo Valley, just outside the Toluca Valley. The official name of the municipality is only Tenancingo but the town is Tenancingo de Degollado and is often confused with Tenancingo, Tlaxcala, which is a town in a different state.

It is a commercial area known for its production of rebozos (a kind of shawl) which have been woven there since the colonial period on both backstrap and pedal looms. Several artisans also produce baskets and fine fruit liquors. Tenancingo is the home to more than 200 carpentry workshops that fashion furniture. There are many green houses in the region that produce cut flowers, and the flower industry is Tenancingo's largest source of income. It is the home of the Santo Desierto del Carmen, the name of both a monastery and a national park.

Tenancingo has recently become known by foreigners as a Paragliding destination, with multiple launches in the region, during the dry season from November to March.

== The town ==
The seat of the municipality is the town of Tenancingo, surrounded by mountains and forest. The main elevation overlooking the town is the Cerro de las Tres Marías, topped by a giant white statue of Christ the King (Cristo Rey), built in 1985, designed by Hector Morret and visible from just about anywhere in the valley below. The monument is reachable by either climbing a staircase with 1,030 steps or by paved road. There is a lookout allowing for a 360-degree panoramic view.

Since it is relatively isolated, Tenancingo has maintained much of its country feel and old traditions despite extensive economic growth and tourism. It has a colonial-era layout, centered on a main plaza filled with young poplars, which replaced aged junipers that grew there before. Market (tianguis) days are still Thursdays and Sundays, which almost five square city blocks with stalls. The plaza contains a traditional kiosk as well as a notable marble statue of Miguel Hidalgo, which was sculpted here but was in the Jardín de los Martires in Toluca for many years before its return. It is said to be the oldest sculpture of its kind in the State of Mexico. The area is known for its rebozos, chairs painted with floral designs and a local sausage/cold cut called Obispo, which attract tourists, most of whom come to the area by buses that connect it with Toluca and Mexico City.

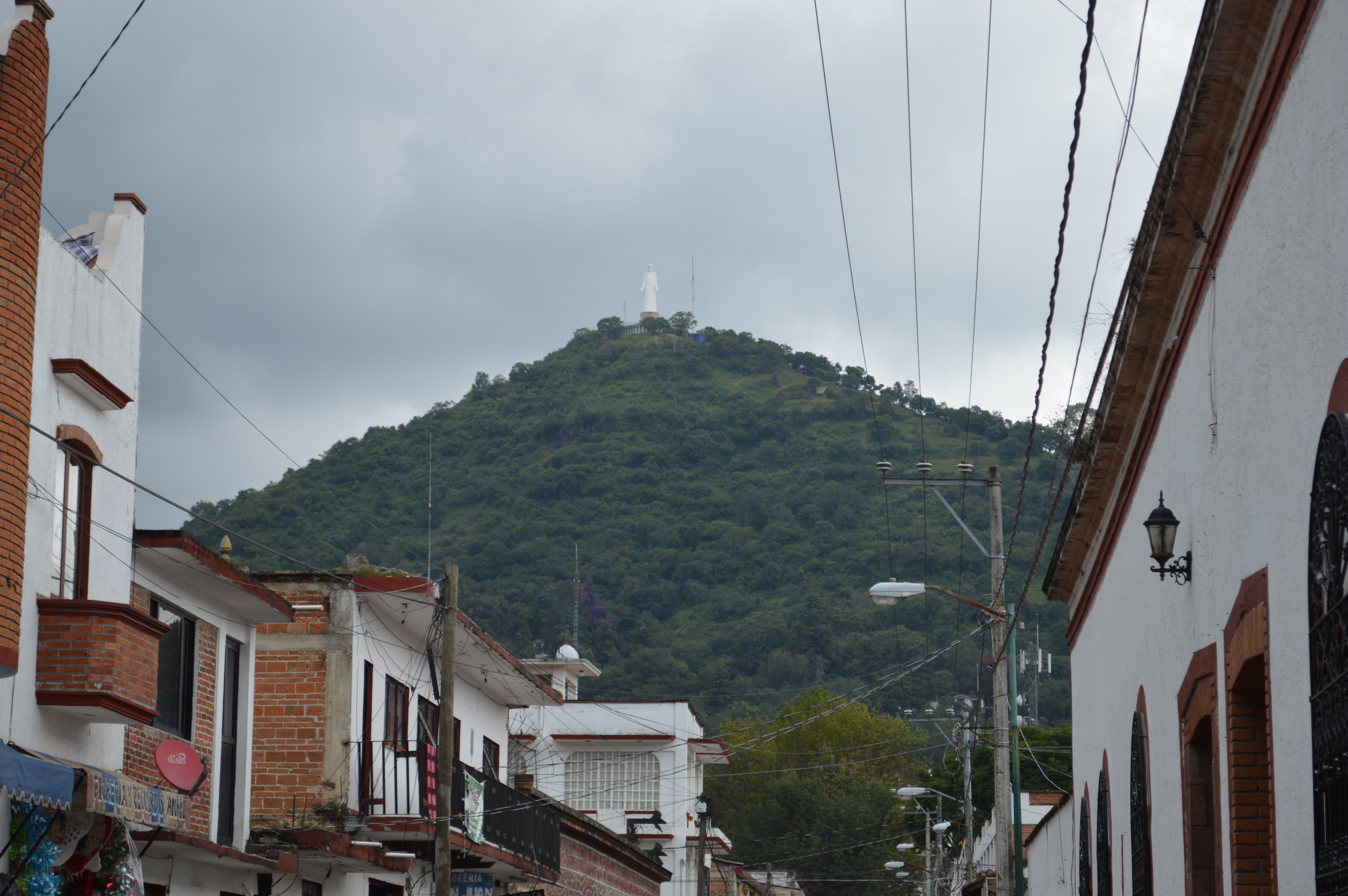
View of the Cristo Rey from Casanova Street

Facing this plaza is the municipal hall, built when the municipality was formed and the San Francisco Asis Parish. This church was built in the 17th century of sandstone. Its interior has a Baroque tabernacle dedicated to Our Lady of the Rosary and a second chamber dedicated to the Virgin Mary.

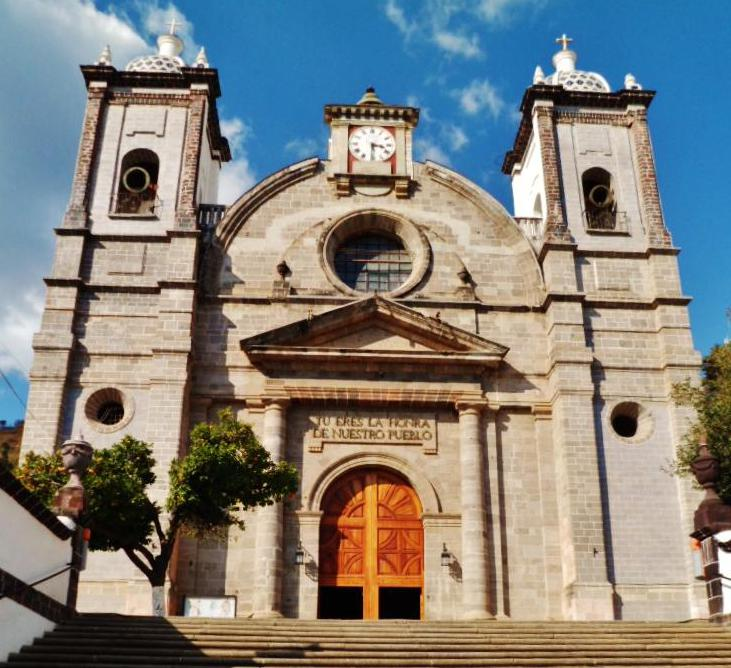
Calvario Temple

Another important church is the Calvario Temple, constructed century in Neoclassical style and finished in 1813. It is also known as the Our Lady of Sorrows Sanctuary and the Basilica of San Clemente, and was recently named a cathedral for the Tenancingo diocese. The interior, especially the cupola contains works by local painter Petronilo Monroy as well as large canvases with scenes of the Passion of the Christ by José María Monroy Briseño. However the latter are exhibited only during Holy Week.

The municipal market was inaugurated in 1972 and the Flower Market was built sometime later, dedicated to the municipality's recent dedicated to the growing of cut flowers.

The Teotla neighborhood (barrio) is one of the oldest in the town. It contains a small plaza and small church.

== The municipality ==
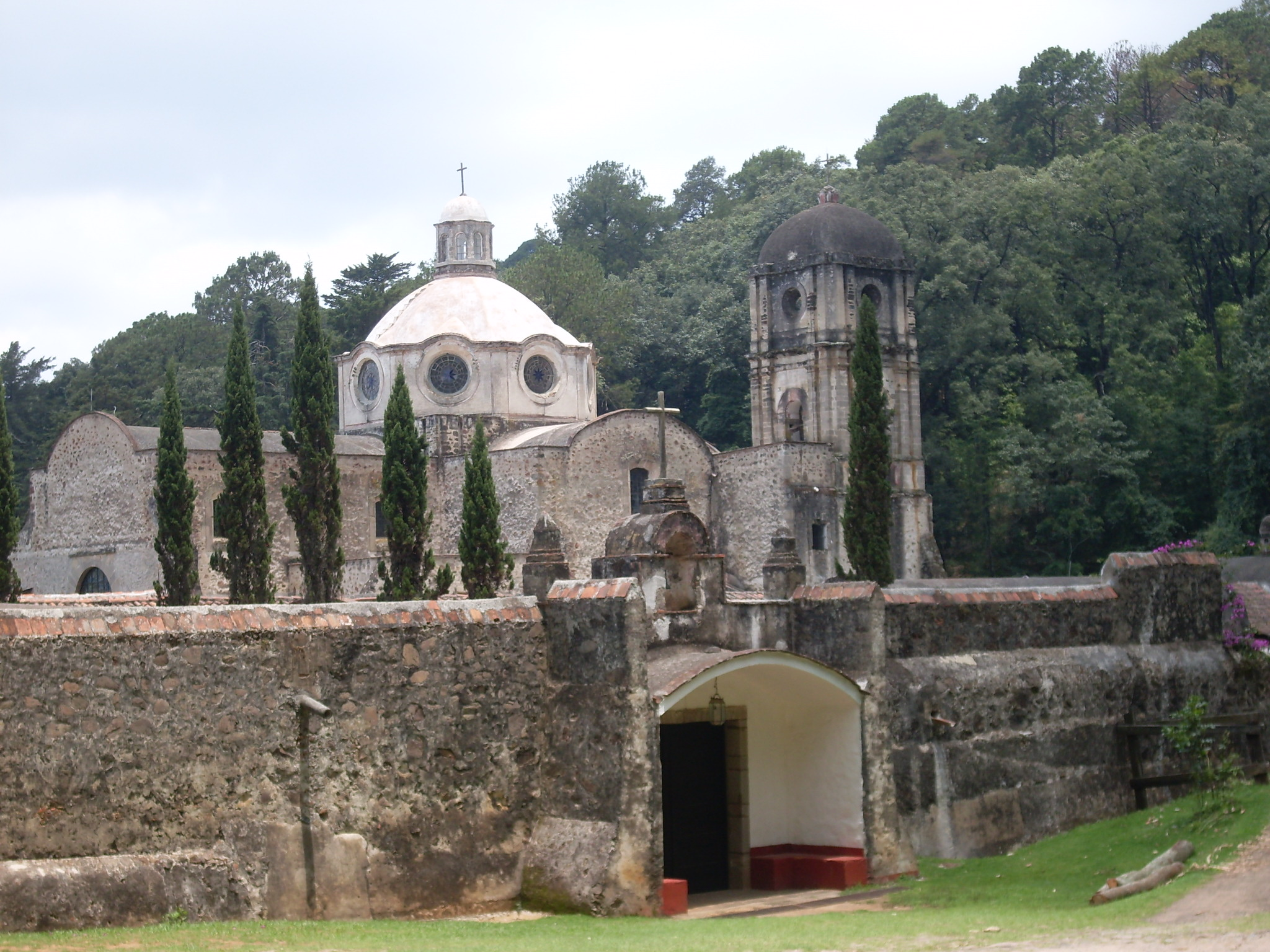
Desierto del Carmen monastery

The municipality is in the south of the State of Mexico, 48 km (30 mi) from the state capital of Toluca. The municipality has one city, four neighborhoods (barrios), twenty ranches, fourteen villages, six agricultural neighborhoods (colonias), eight urban neighborhoods (colonias), ten semi-urban neighborhoods (colonias) and two communities of a type called internado, which together form a territory of 160.18 km^{2} (61.85 sq mi). The municipality borders the municipalities of Tenango del Valle, Joquicingo, Zumpahuacán, Malinalco and Villa Guerrero. The local government consists of a municipal president, one syndic, and ten representatives called regidors.

Attractions in the municipality (outside the seat) include the Tecomatlán Parish, the chapels located in the communities of San Simonito, Zepayautla, Acatzingo and Teola and the former haciendas of Tenería, Monte de Pozo and Santa Ana.

However, the major cultural landmark for the area is the Desierto del Carmen monastery and National Park, located twelve km south of the town of Tenancingo. It is a heavily forested area which centers on the Carmelite monastery, one of few in Mexico that still hosts monks and religious activities.

The monastery was built in the late 18th century and consecrated in 1801 as a new home for the monks of the Desierto de los Leones, when they decided that they needed to be further away from the expanding Mexico City. The monastery was abandoned for a time in the early 20th century but the order retook the facility, establishing a school called the Colegio de Filosofía de los Carmelitas Descalzados in 1951 and in 1956, it was designated as a "house of prayer" open to all. It still hosts religious gatherings along with quiet spaces open to the public for prayer and contemplation. The monastery complex has a number of living facilities and storage units as well as former hermitages dedicated to John the Baptist, Saint Joseph and Mary Magdalene. The church contains a life-sized wood crucifix called the Cristo de las Siete Suertes. The surrounding forest has hiking trails and picnic areas as well as three lookout points: Balcon del Diablo, San Elias and Peña Colorada.

== Socioeconomics ==
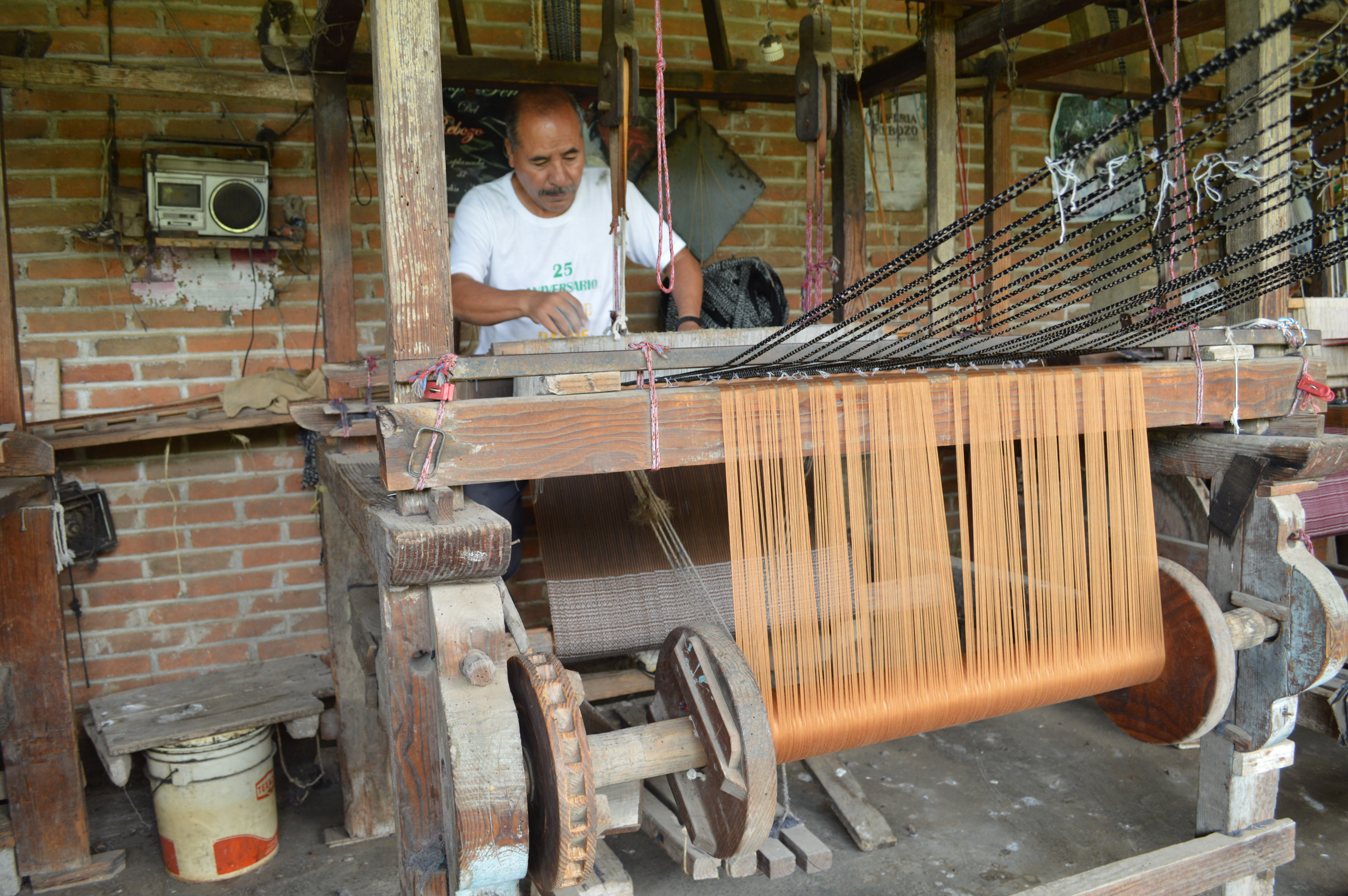
Work in progress at the Inocencio Borboa workshop in Tenancingo

Most of the population of the municipality lives in the valley floor, in or near the municipal seat. However, small communities can be found at very high elevations such as San José Chalmita and San Antonio Agua Bendita. The municipality is poor with 60.2% of the population suffering from either moderate (43.1%) or extreme (17.1%) poverty. 15.3 percent live in substandard housing and thirty percent live without one or more services such as running water and electricity. 42.1% are considered to have substandard access to nutrition.

Average years of schooling for residents is 8.1 years, below the state average of 9.1. The municipality has 179 educational centers including 69 preschools, 63 primary schools, 33 middle schools, 14 high schools and four vocational schools. There are several campuses with higher studies such as the Escuela Central Agrícola de Tenería (est. 1927), the Universidad Autónoma del Estado de México - Centro Universitario UAEM Tenancingo and the Centro Universitario Iberoamericano de Tenancingo. There are no educational facilities specifically targeting an indigenous population.

Major local celebrations include Lunes de Carnaval (when residents elect an "Ugly King") and a procession of silence and passion play during Holy Week. The Carnival of Tenancingo was established in 1982. Other important dates include Epiphany, the Feria de Jarro on Ash Wednesday and the feast of Our Lady of Mount Carmel (July 16). These are popular dates for weddings and confirmation and feature native folk dance, religious services, fireworks, traveling amusement rides as well as local food specialties. There are two main ingredients in local cuisine: chayotes, once the main agricultural crop and so important that residents call themselves chayotes, and obispo, a kind of sausage or cold cut. Common dishes include chayotes con pipian, tinga (chicken or pork), carnero en salsa and chilacayotes con venas de chile.

The main economic activities of the municipality are agriculture, commerce and handcrafts. Although a recent phenomenon, its main agricultural crop is cut flowers, grown in greenhouses with many exported. Cultivated species include gladiolas and roses. Other crops include avocados and peaches and there is some honey and other bee products now produced as a consequence of the flower trade. Santa Ana Ixtlahuatzingo is particularly noted for the growing of flowers, as is the community of San Miguel Tecomatlán.

The main handcrafts produced by the municipality are rustic furniture, fruit liquors, sweaters, baskets and, by far the best known, rebozos. Furniture making is mostly concentrated in the La Campana neighborhood of the seat. The classic style of the area is lacquered in white or pastel colors, decorated with flowers painted by hand. Much of the fruit liquor production is exported. Most of the basket production is concentrated in the town of Chalchihuapan.

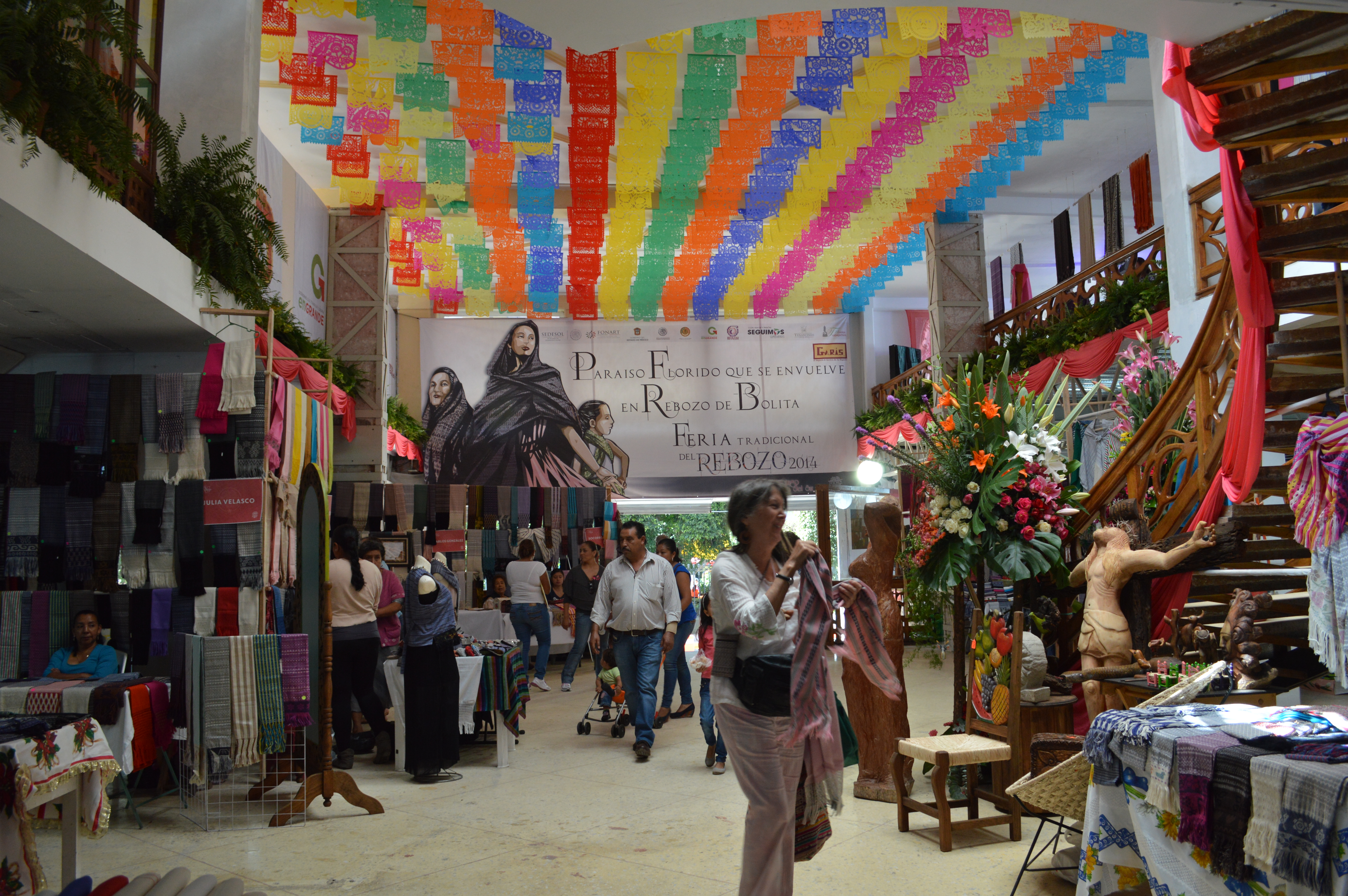
Feria de Rebozo 2014

Rebozos have been made in the municipal area since the colonial period using both indigenous backstrap looms and Spanish pedal looms. This continues to this day with most production today concentrated in the town of Tenancingo and nearby Acatzingo. The municipality has about thirty weavers and over 180 empuntadoras, those who finger-weave the fringes. Making a rebozo requires fifteen steps, from the ikat dying method to the weaving and the creation of the fringes. There are fringe weaves that take up to four months to do. Prices for rebozos generally run between 400 and 4,000 pesos each, depending on the quality of the thread, the tightness and complexity of the weave and the intricateness of the woven fringes.

There are several notable rebozo weavers in Tenancingo. One of these is Evaristo Borboa, who received a National Galardon from the federal government for his work in 2014. His work has been exhibited in Mexico and abroad, in such countries as Japan and Germany. He has worked as a weaver all his life, starting when he was eight years old and is only one of two in Tenancingo who weaves with a backstrap loom (along with Salomon Gonzalez Pedraza). He uses commercially made cotton thread and used to use natural dyes but has since switched to synthetics. Most of Evaristo's buyers are foreigners because of the publicity he has received. He has said that he will die with threads in his hand and knows the exact number of threads in each rebozo he makes. Another notable rebozo maker is Luis Rodriguez Martinez, who distributes his ware in various parts of Mexico including Puebla, Oaxaca, Morelos, Michoacán, Guanajuato, Guadalajara and Mexico City.

Weaving is mostly done by men with women knotting the fringe. In Ixpuichapan, there is an association of women dedicated to the weaving of fringes.

Luis Rodriguez Martinez has stated that the craft is in danger of disappearing from Tenancingo. Currently there are 35 weavers from 200 about 70 years ago and thirty of these have been in operation for more than sixty years. The main reason for the loss of artisans is the low prices of rebozos, including imitations from abroad. Weavers have taken to making other items such as neckties and bags using the same material as the rebozos. Children of weavers, including those of Evarito Borboa, are deciding not to follow in their parents' footsteps.

To help preserve the tradition, in 2014, the town hosted the first National Rebozo Contest, sponsored by FONART and the state tourism secretary. It attracts over thirty artisans and about 3,500 people each year with pieces available here running between 200 and 15,000 pesos.

== Geography ==
The municipality is located in a small valley just southeast of the Toluca Valley. The ruggedness of the area is due to its formation by an eruption of the Nevado de Toluca volcano. It is possible that the valley was a lake, which eventually dried up as the rocks here are both volcanic and sedimentary.

The average altitude is 2,300 metres (7,500 ft), varying between 2,060 and 2,490 metres (6,760 and 8,170 ft) above sea level. Major peaks include Peña Colorada, La Vibora, la Tezontlera, La Cantera and La Malinche, with the last two part of a small range called the Nixcongo. From the highest elevations of the municipality, it is possible to see the peaks of the Nevado de Toluca and Popocatepetl.

=== Climate ===
The municipality's climate is temperate and semi-moist with a rainy season. Average annual precipitation is between 1,000 and 1,500mm with most of this falling in the late summer and early fall. The rest of the year is mostly dry. Average annual temperature is 18.2°C.

=== Hydrography ===
The only surface water is from dams constructed to collect runoff located in San José Tenería, Ejido de Tenancingo, San Nicolás Tepetzingo, Colonia San Isido and Ixpuichiapan, which provide water both for drinking and agriculture.

=== Flora and fauna ===
Wild vegetation is still abundant in the municipality with numerous plants species native to the area. Wildlife includes squirrels, armadillos, cacomixtle, rabbits, coyotes, bats, opossums, various lizards and other reptiles and various bird species. The higher elevations are heavily forested.

The main natural attraction is the Hermenguildo Galeana Park, a 343-hectare (850-acre) reserve established in 1980 about 10 km (6.2 mi) outside the municipal seat. It is accessed only by dirt road and is heavily forested, but offers cabins, palapas and areas for horseback riding and other sports. The Santa Ana Ixtlahualcingo Falls are 4 km (2.5 mi) outside the community of the same name which also has camping. .5 km (1,600 ft) from there is another waterfall called San Simonito.

== History ==
=== Designation ===
The name is derived from the Nahuatl phrase tenamitl, which means 'small walls or fortifications' and the suffix co meaning 'place.' Changes in pronunciation are due to the influence of Spanish. The walls/fortifications refer to the natural steep formations of the mountains of the original indigenous settlement, which was difficult to access. The modern town is denoted by both a seal and an Aztec glyph. The seal depicts walls, as per its name, as well as a rebozo, a garment which is manufactured here. The Aztec glyph is how the area was represented in pre Hispanic records. It also indicates walls.

=== Pre-Hispanic period ===
The first human settlements in the area date back as far as 1800 BCE, found in Ixpuichiapan and the Cerro de las Tres Marías. Between 1300 and 800 BCE settlements spread to the Nixcongo, Exhacienda de Monte de Pozoa and the Texpoxtepec area, showing Olmec influence.

The pre-Hispanic town was located about 5 km (3.1 mi) south of the modern one, today called Acatzingo de la Piedra. The area abounds in artifacts such as ceramics and petroglyphs. During the pre-Classic to the Classic period, remains from this area show Purépecha influence in the Nixcongo and Monte de Pozo areas, with settlements in San Simonito, Tecomatlan and San Jose Chalmita showing Matlatzinca influence. With the rise of the Aztecs, the lord of Tenancingo allied himself with Axayacatl to help subdue Malinalco, Calpulli Coapipitzoatepec (Xochiaca), allowing it to remain independent.

=== Colonial period ===
After the Spanish conquest of the Aztec Empire, the area became part of an encomienda given to Juan Salcedo, with the family controlling the lands for several generations. Evangelization of the same area was done by the Augustinians starting in 1537 and constructed the first hermitage here.

In the first organization of New Spain in 1535, Tenancingo was part of the archbishopric of Mexico in the eastern province. The modern town was founded in 1551 at the foot of what is now the Cerro de las Trés Marías, in the valley of Tenancingo 5 km (3.1 mi) from the indigenous town. The native population was relocated to an area now called Barrio de Salitre and were obligated to build a hermitage here dedicated to Our Lady of Refuge. The Augustinians constructed what is now the San Francisco parish. In 1561 priest Alfonso Martinez de Zayas took over evangelization efforts and also took control over large extensions of land in order to plant wheat.

From 1565 to 1577 various Spaniards such as Angel Villafaña, Catalina de Ablornez and Francisco Bullon were granted lands here and by 1600 the Tenancingo region was divided into areas controlled by the towns of Tenancigo, Tepetzingo, Exlahutzingo, Talcoquiapan, Cultepec, Teculoyan, Icotlan, Chichualhucan and Tlaxomulco. The region became known for its cultivation of grapes, berries and olives. In 1613, the San Francisco Parish was expanded under the direction of the Franciscans.

At least as far back as 1790, the town was noted for the making of rebozos. The first hacienda was established in 1771 in the small town of Chiquihuitepec, one of three that would remain until the Mexican Revolution .

=== 19th century ===
In 1801, the Carmelite monastery in Tenancingo was finished, the new home for the monks formerly at the Desierto de los Leones.

In 1812, the area was the scene of a battle of the Mexican War of Independence which pitted José María Morelos y Pavón against Royalist general Rosendo Porlier. Earlier, Porlier had taken control of the area but Morelos succeeded in driving these forces out.

After the war, the area was partitioned from that of Malinalco to form a new municipality. The following decades saw this municipality change with the gain of the towns of San Simón de los Comales in 1837 and the towns of San Martin, Xochiaca and Zepayautla in 1847. The municipality lost the town of San Francisco Tepexocuca to Tenango del Valle in 1847 and the communities of Zumpahuacan, San Gaspar, San Pablo and San Antonio in 1875.

In 1860, the town was sacked by a group rebelling against the government and set on fire.

In 1861, Tenancingo was officially declared a town and gained the appendage de Degollado to its name, in honor of Santos Degollado. This was followed by city status in 1878.

In 1866, an association of artisans was formed in the town to support those who make rebozos and other items.

In the latter 19th century there was construction and other improvements with the Calvario Temple consecrated in 1863, the Capilla de Jesus in 1866 and the municipal palace and Alameda Park in 1878. The streets were realigned in 1871.

In 1885 there was a skirmish between the towns of San José Chalmita and Zumpahuacan.

=== 20th century to the present ===
The first decades of the 20th century brought conflict to the area: first the Mexican Revolution and then the Cristero War. Both resulted in the hindrance of economic development although the three main haciendas (including Teneria, then owned by prominent politician José Ives Limantour) were broken up and the land redistributed. At the start of the Cristero War, the churches were closed by the government but not the Carmelite monastery, which had already been abandoned when the last hermit, Friar Pedro de Santa Maria died in 1915. Reaction included attacks by a band of Cristeros under Benjamin Mendoza, which blocked the Tenancingo-San José Chalmita road and killing a number of people.

In 1929, a smallpox and measles epidemic killed many of the municipality's inhabitants, especially the young.

After these calamities, the rest of the 20th century is mostly marked by development of infrastructure and the economy. Paving of streets and sidewalks was begun in 1930 with one of the main streets named after Pablo Gonzalez Casanova in 1936. The civil hospital was inaugurated in 1937.

Local newspapers of various types were established in the municipality starting in 1937 and a radio station, XEQ, went on the air in 1942, with the song "Tenancingo" by Manuel Rentaria Polanco.

The municipal library was inaugurated in 1949. The Lux Cinema was established in 1952, the Petronilo Monroy middle school in 1957 and the Benito Juarez Plaza in 1970.

For conservation and tourism purposes, in 1972, the State of Mexico government declared Tenancingo a "typical city" and a monument was constructed to mark the 100th anniversary of its declaration as s city.

In 1979, the potable water and drainage system was expanded and improved, with the Casa de Cultura built in 1981 and the football stadium in 1982.

However, there have still been economic problems in the municipality. In 1981, flower producers in Santa Ana Ixtlahuatzingo destroyed five rainwater-capturing tanks as part of ongoing socio-political disputes, igniting a conflict between it and the seat of the municipality. Poverty and access to resources are still issues.

Tenancingo was named a diocese by Pope Benedict XVI in 2009, separating from the Toluca diocese with the basilica named as cathedral.
