= Ocuilan =

- Municipality
- Coat of arms

- Location in Mexico
- Coordinates: 19°0′0″N 99°24′0″W
- Country: Mexico
- State: Mexico (state)
- Municipal seat: Ocuilan de Arteaga

Area
  - Total: 344.84 km^{2} (133.14 sq mi)

Population (2005)
  - Total: 26,332
- Time zone: UTC-6 (Central Standard Time)

Ocuilan is a municipality in Mexico State in Mexico. The municipality covers an area of 344.84 km^{2} (133.14 sq mi).

As of 2005, the municipality had a total population of 26,332.

== History ==
The historical language of the area is Ocuiltec, named for this town. The area was conquered by Aztec emperor Axayacatl, subsequently becoming one of the smallest tributary provinces. It paid tribute in cotton and maguey mantas, warrior costumes, grain, and two thousand vessels of salt, the last item likely coming from nearby Tonatico.
