= Joquicingo =

- Municipality
- Coat of arms

- Location in Mexico
- Coordinates: 19°03′20″N 99°32′48″W
- Country: Mexico
- State: Mexico (state)

Area
  - Total: 49.2 km^{2} (19.0 sq mi)

Population (2005)
  - Total: 11,042
- Time zone: UTC-6 (Central Standard Time)

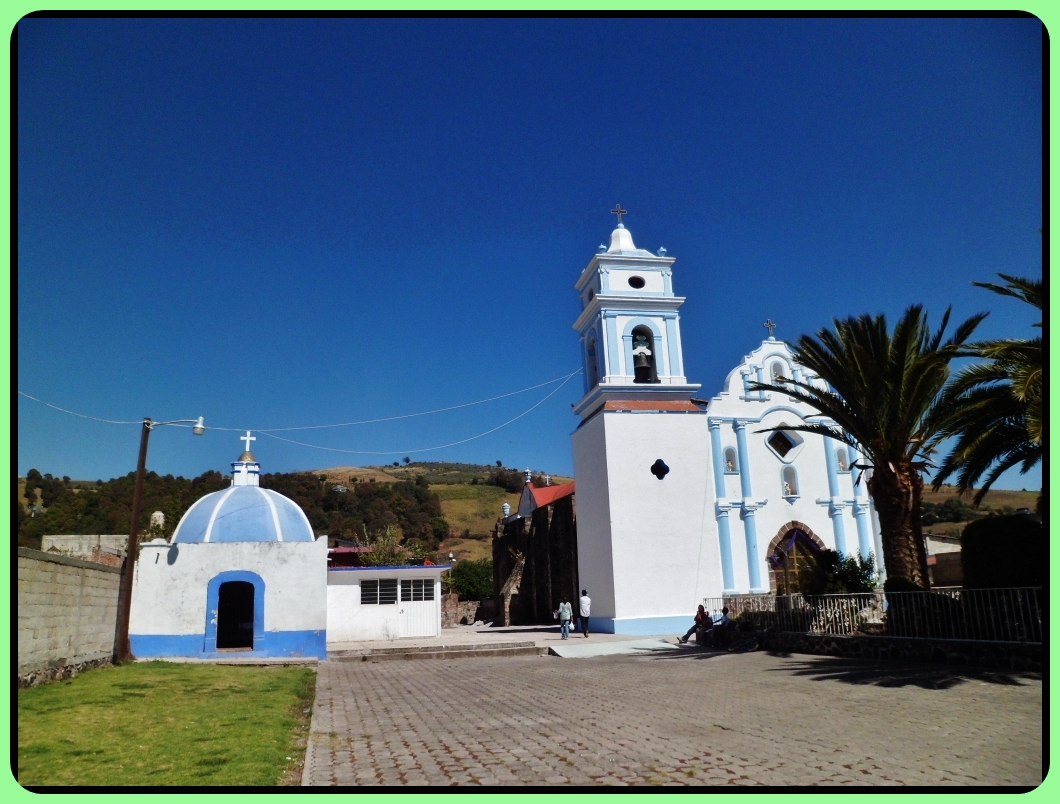
Parish of the Assumption of Mary in Joquicingo

Joquicingo is a municipality in Mexico State in Mexico. The municipal seat is the town of Joquicingo de León Guzmán. The municipality covers an area of 49.2 km^{2}.

As of 2005, the municipality had a total population of 11,042.

In 2021, Joquicingo was the location of the deadly bus crash.
