= Pilcaya (municipality) =

Municipality in the Mexican state of Guerrero

Pilcaya Pilcacyan
- Municipality
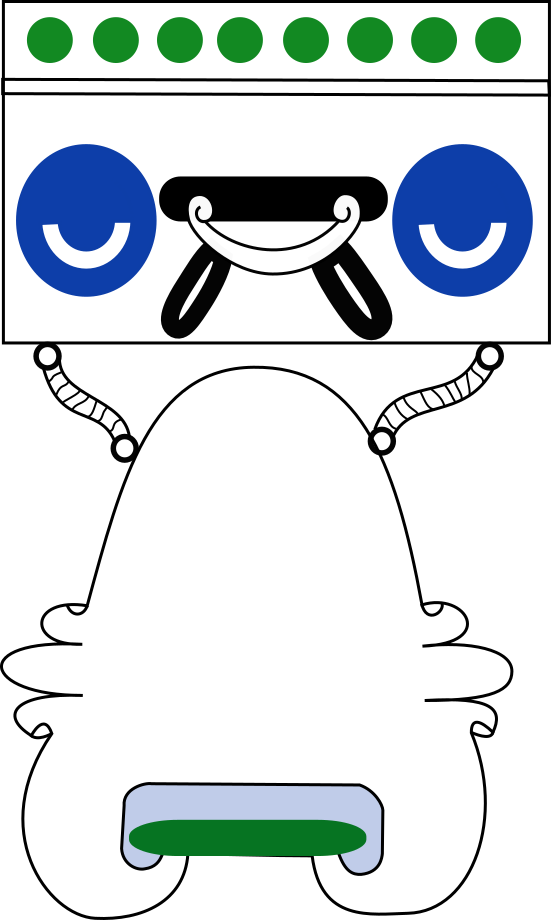
- Coat of arms
- Nickname: Pilcaya la bella
- Motto: Pilcaya Cambia
- Location within Guerrero Location within Mexico
- Coordinates: 18°42′N 99°30′W
- Country: Mexico
- State: Guerrero
- Municipal seat: Pilcaya

Government
  - Municipal Mayor: Mardonio Reyna Castañeda (PRD)

Area
  - Total: 62.1 km^{2} (24.0 sq mi)

Population (2005)
  - Total: 11,035
- Time zone: UTC-6 (Central)

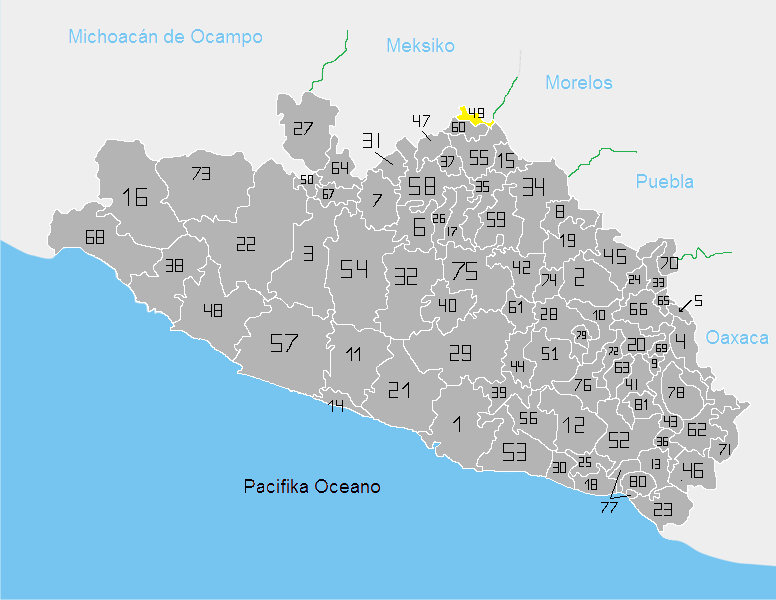
Locator maps of municipalities of Guerrero

Pilcaya is a municipality in the Mexican state of Guerrero. The municipal seat lies at Pilcaya. The municipality covers an area of 62.1 km^{2}.

Pilcaya is located 153 kilometers from Mexico City, 105 from Cuernavaca, 84 from Toluca, 68 from Taxco and 5 from Ixtapan de la Sal. Pilcaya, of Náhuatl origin, is from the Náhuatl word pilcacyan, place of a hanging object.

== The Town ==
Pilcaya is mainly an agricultural town whose main activity is the cultivation of gladiola flowers which growers sell in nearby Tenancingo and Mexico City. There is also a recent surge in the building of greenhouses which mainly grow tomatoes for sale in Mexico City and the local market.

== Landmarks in Pilcaya ==
Sanctuary of La Imaculada Concepcion, whose construction was initiated in 1650 and is still in use. Parque Nacional Grutas de Cacahuamilpa.

== The Municipality ==
As municipal seat, Pilcaya has governing jurisdiction over the following communities:La Concepcion, Cacahuamilpa, El Mogote, El Sauz, Crucero de Grutas, El Platanar, Juchimilpa, El Bosque, Nombre de Dios, Los Sauces, Santa Maria, Chimaltitlan, Amatitlan, Cuitlapa, El Uvalar, Tecuanipa, Chichila, Piedras Negras, El Transformador, and Santa Teresa. The population of the municipality of Pilcaya is 10,050 as of 2005. The municipality of Pilcaya is the only municipality in Guerrero to border both the state of Mexico and the state of Morelos. It borders the municipio of Ixtapan, Tonatico, Coatepec Harinas and Zacualpan in the state of Mexico to the north and west. To the east it borders Coatlan del Rio in the state of Morelos. And to the south it borders Taxco and Tetipac both in the state of Guerrero.

As of 2005, the municipality had a total population of 11,035.
