= Pilcaya =

Town in the Mexican state of Guerrero

- Location within Guerrero Location within Mexico
- Coordinates: 25°06′N 106°34′W

Government
  - Mayor: Ellery Guadalupe Figueroa Macedo (PRI)
- Elevation: 1,610 m (5,280 ft)
  - Density: 174.73/km^{2} (452.5/sq mi)
- Time zone: UTC-6 (Zona Centro)
- ZIP Code: 40380
- Area code: 721
- Website: http://www.pilcaya.gob.mx

Pilcaya is a town and municipal seat of the municipality of Pilcaya in the Mexican state of Guerrero. It is located 153 kilometres (95 mi) from Mexico City, 105 kilometres (65 mi) from Cuernavaca, 84 kilometres (52 mi) from Toluca, 68 kilometres (42 mi) from Taxco and 5 kilometres (3 mi) from Ixtapan de la Sal. The name "Pilcaya" is from the Nahuatl word pilcacyan, place of a hanging object.

== Town ==
Pilcaya is mainly an agricultural town with a population of 4,899. Its main agricultural activity is the cultivation of gladiola flowers which growers sell in nearby Tenancingo and Mexico City. There is also a recent surge in the building of greenhouses which mainly grow tomatoes for the domestic market.

== Landmarks ==
Sanctuary of La Imaculada Concepción, whose construction was initiated in 1650 and is still in use. Parque Nacional Grutas de Cacahuamilpa

== Municipality ==
As municipal seat, Pilcaya has governing jurisdiction over the following communities: La Concepcion, Cacahuamilpa, El Mogote, El Sauz, Crucero de Grutas, El Platanar, Juchimilpa, El Bosque, Nombre de Dios, Los Sauces, Santa Maria, Chimaltitlan, Amatitlan, Cuitlapa, El Uvalar, Tecuanipa, Chichila, Piedras Negras, El Transformador, and Santa Teresa. The population of the municipality of Pilcaya is 10,050 as of 2005. The municipality of Pilcaya is the only municipality in Guerrero to border both the state of Mexico and the state of Morelos. It borders the municipio of Ixtapan, Tonatico, Zumpahuacán, Coatepec Harinas and Zacualpan in state of Mexico to the north and west. To the east it borders Coatlan del Rio in the state of Morelos. And to the south it borders Taxco and Tetipac, both in the state of Guerrero. The territorial extension of Pilcaya is 91.724 square kilometres (35.415 mi^{2}). The population of the municipality as of 2005 was 10,851.
