= Grutas de Cacahuamilpa (painting by Baron Gros) =

Painting by Jean-Baptiste Louis Gros

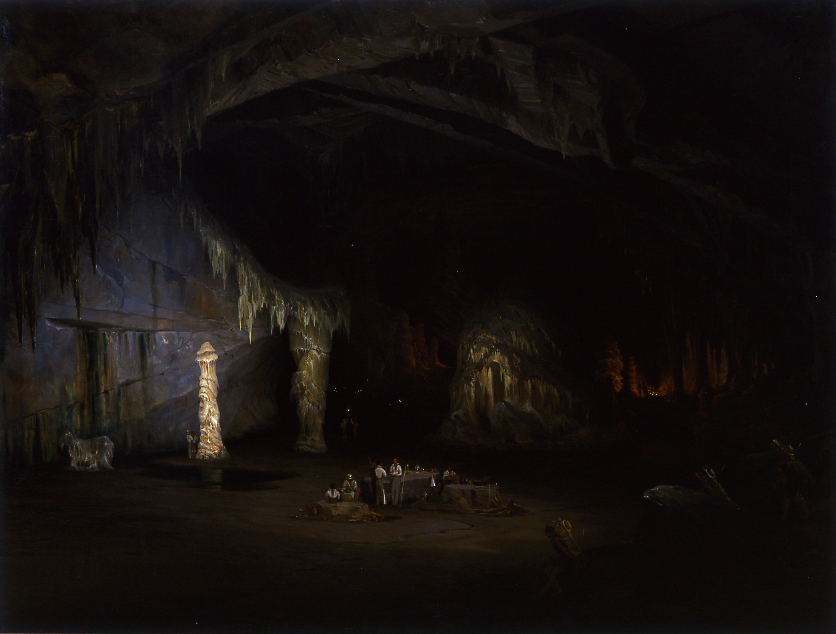
7075 Grutas de Cacahuamilpa

Cacahuamilpa's Grottos (Grutas de Cacahuamilpa in Spanish) is an oil painting finished in 1835 by Antoine-Jean Gros, after his second visit to the caves in Grutas de Cacahuamilpa National Park, in Guerrero, Mexico. It is now in the Museo Soumaya, Mexico City.

== Features ==
The picture, in a naturalist style, shows a group using the rocks as a table. The chiaroscuro arises from the lights of the expeditioners, giving a Romantic feeling.
