= Tintner =

Tintner is a surname. Notable people with the surname include:

- Frederick Tintner (1912–2015), Czech-British soldier
- Georg Tintner (1917–1999), Austrian conductor
- Gerhard Tintner (1907–1983), Austrian–American economist
- Hans Tintner (1894–1942), Austrian film producer and director

== See also ==
- Wintner
