= Wintner =

Wintner is a surname. Notable people with the surname include:

- Aurel Wintner (1903–1958), mathematician; one of the founders of probabilistic number theory
- Robert Wintner, author and entrepreneur

== See also ==
- Tintner
- Winter (surname)
