= Sergio Calderón =

American actor (1945–2023)

- Publicity photo of Sergio Calderón
- Born: July 21, 1945; Coatlán del Río, Morelos, Mexico
- Died: May 31, 2023 (aged 77); Los Angeles, California, U.S.
- Occupation: Actor
- Years active: 1970–2023
- Notable work: Men in Black; Pirates of the Caribbean: At World's End; The Ruins
- Spouse: Karen Dakin
- Children: 2

Sergio Calderón (July 21, 1945 – May 31, 2023) was a Mexican-born American actor known for his roles in Men in Black, Pirates of the Caribbean: At World's End, and The Ruins.

== Biography ==
Calderón was born in Coatlán del Río, Morelos. He moved to Mexico City when he was ten.

He died of pneumonia in Los Angeles, California, on May 31, 2023, at the age of 77.

== Career ==
Calderón's career spanned six decades. He studied at the Instituto Andrés Soler of the Asociación Nacional de Actores. Afterwards, Calderón made his onscreen debut in The Bridge in the Jungle (1970).

In Men in Black, Calderón played the human disguise under which an extraterrestrial named Mikey tried to sneak across the Mexico–US border. He played one of the Pirate Lords, Captain Villanueva, in Pirates of the Caribbean: At World's End. He also appeared in Little Fockers.
