= Nový Jičín =

- Town
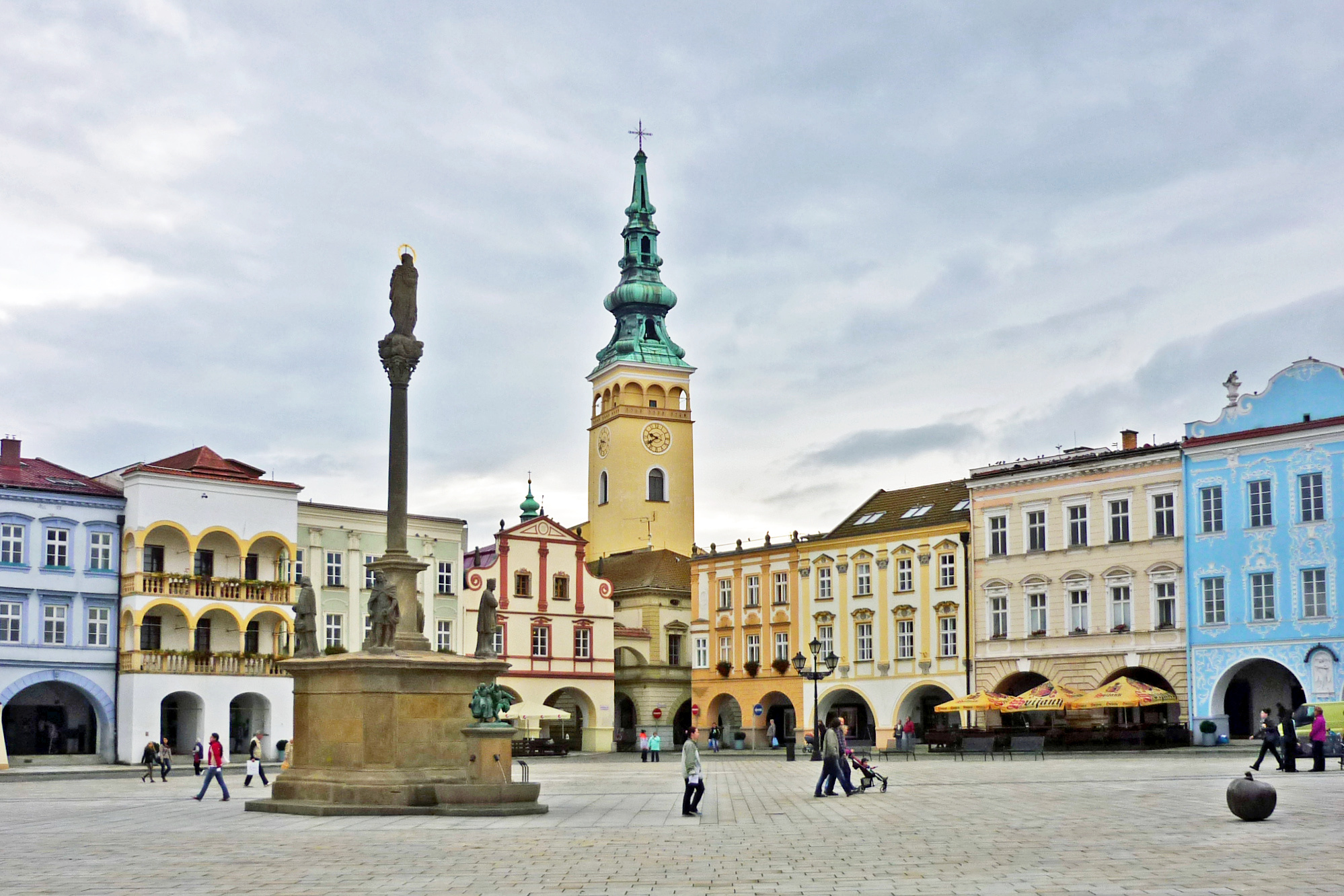
- Masarykovo náměstí with the Church of the Assumption of the Virgin Mary

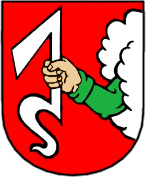
- Flag Coat of arms

- Location in the Czech Republic
- Coordinates: 49°35′40″N 18°0′37″E
- Country: Czech Republic
- Region: Moravian-Silesian
- District: Nový Jičín
- First mentioned: 1313

Government
  - Mayor: Jiří Klein

Area
  - Total: 36.52 km^{2} (14.10 sq mi)
- Elevation: 285 m (935 ft)

Population (2026-01-01)
  - Total: 22,740
  - Density: 622.7/km^{2} (1,613/sq mi)
- Time zone: UTC+1 (CET)
  - Summer (DST): UTC+2 (CEST)
- Postal code: 741 01
- Website: www.novyjicin.cz

Nový Jičín (Czech pronunciation: [ˈnoviː ˈjɪtʃiːn]; German: Neutitschein) is a town in the Moravian-Silesian Region of the Czech Republic. It has about 23,000 inhabitants. The town is located on the Jičínka River in the Moravian-Silesian Foothills.

Nový Jičín was probably founded around 1280. It is an industrial town, known mainly for the hat-making industry, which is why it is nicknamed "the town of hats". The historic centre of Nový Jičín is well preserved and is protected as an urban monument reservation. Among the main landmarks are the Church of the Assumption of the Virgin Mary and Žerotínský Castle.

== Administrative division ==
Nový Jičín consists of six municipal parts (in brackets population according to the 2021 census):

- Nový Jičín (16,848)
- Bludovice (391)
- Kojetín (195)
- Loučka (2,997)
- Straník (489)
- Žilina (1,736)

== Etymology ==
There are two theories as to how the name "Jičín" came about. According to local legends, it could be derived from the brave daughter of a local castle owner named Jitka (Jitčín, later evolved to Jičín). Another theory derives the name from the Slavic word for 'wild boar' dik (Dičín, later amended to Jičín).

The prefix Nový ('new') was added to distinguish it from Starý Jičín ('old Jičín').

== Geography ==
Nový Jičín is located about 30 kilometres (19 mi) southwest of Ostrava. It lies in the Moravian-Silesian Foothills. The highest point is the hill Dlouhý kopec at 585 m (1,919 ft) above sea level. The town is situated on the Jičínka River, at its confluence with the streams Zrzávka, Grasmanka and Rakovec.

== History ==
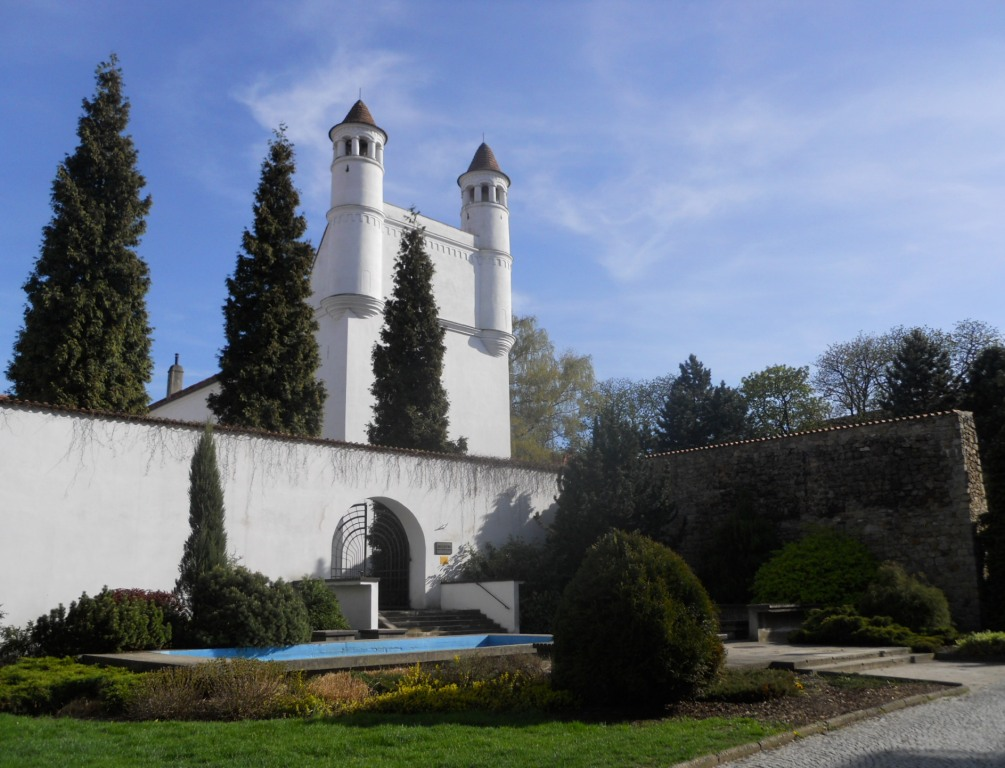
Žerotínský Castle

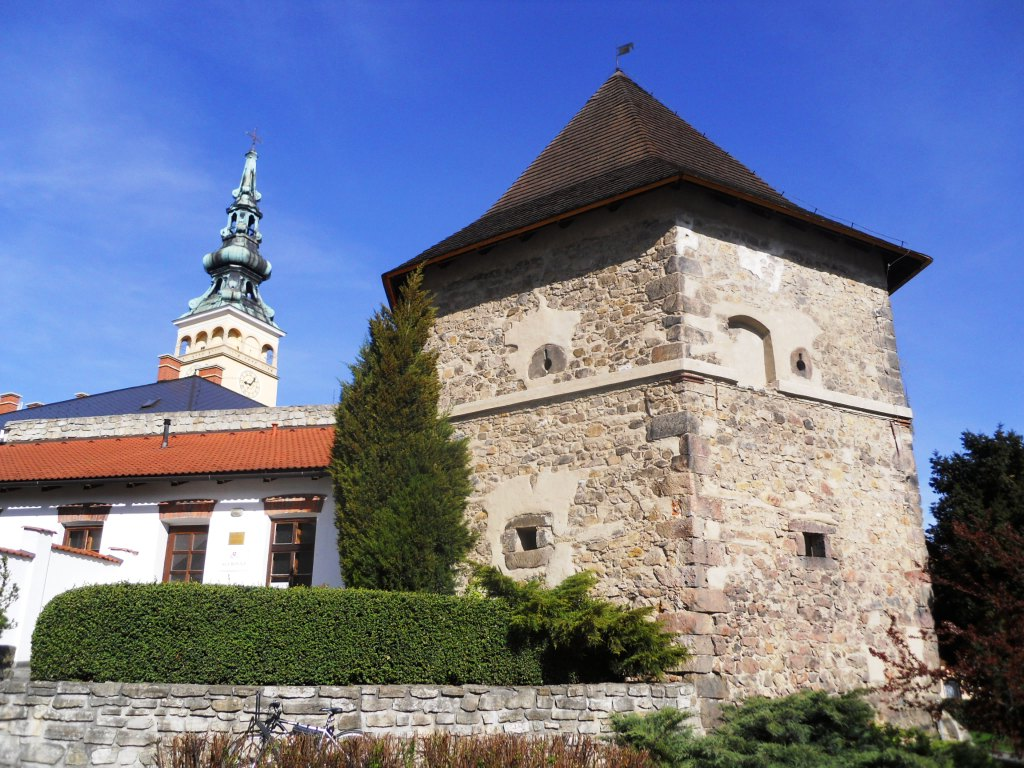
Remains of the town fortifications

The first written mention of Nový Jičín is from 1313, however it was probably founded around 1280. It was established as the economic centre of the Starý Jičín estate. It was a property of the Lords of Kravaře and later of the Zierotin family.

Žerotínský Castle was originally part of the town fortifications, the construction of which began in the 1380s and continued in the early 16th century. During the rule of Bedřich of Zierotin (1533–1541), the castle was rebuilt into a Renaissance residence.

In 1620, Frederick V promoted Nový Jičín to a royal town. The town was decimated by Thirty Years' War and by large fires in 1768 and 1773. The town was in 1790 the headquarters of the Austrian field-marshal Loudon, who died here in the same year and is buried in the parish church.

In the 19th century, the Jewish population returned to the town and large textile factories were established. The hatter industry has flourished and Nový Jičín is still today called the "town of hats". During the industrialisation in the mid-19th century, two town gates and most turrets and attic of the castle were demolished. Only two defense towers were left in memory.

Until 1918, the town was part of Austria-Hungary, head of the district with the same name, one of the 34 Bezirkshauptmannschaften in Moravia.

The German population was expelled in 1945.

== Demographics ==
Historical population

Year	Pop.	±%
1869	12,213	—
1880	14,205	+16.3%
1890	15,695	+10.5%
1900	16,480	+5.0%
1910	18,910	+14.7%

Year	Pop.	±%
1921	17,643	−6.7%
1930	18,660	+5.8%
1950	15,691	−15.9%
1961	17,647	+12.5%
1970	18,878	+7.0%

Year	Pop.	±%
1980	22,796	+20.8%
1991	24,899	+9.2%
2001	25,325	+1.7%
2011	23,202	−8.4%
2021	22,656	−2.4%

Source: Censuses

== Economy ==
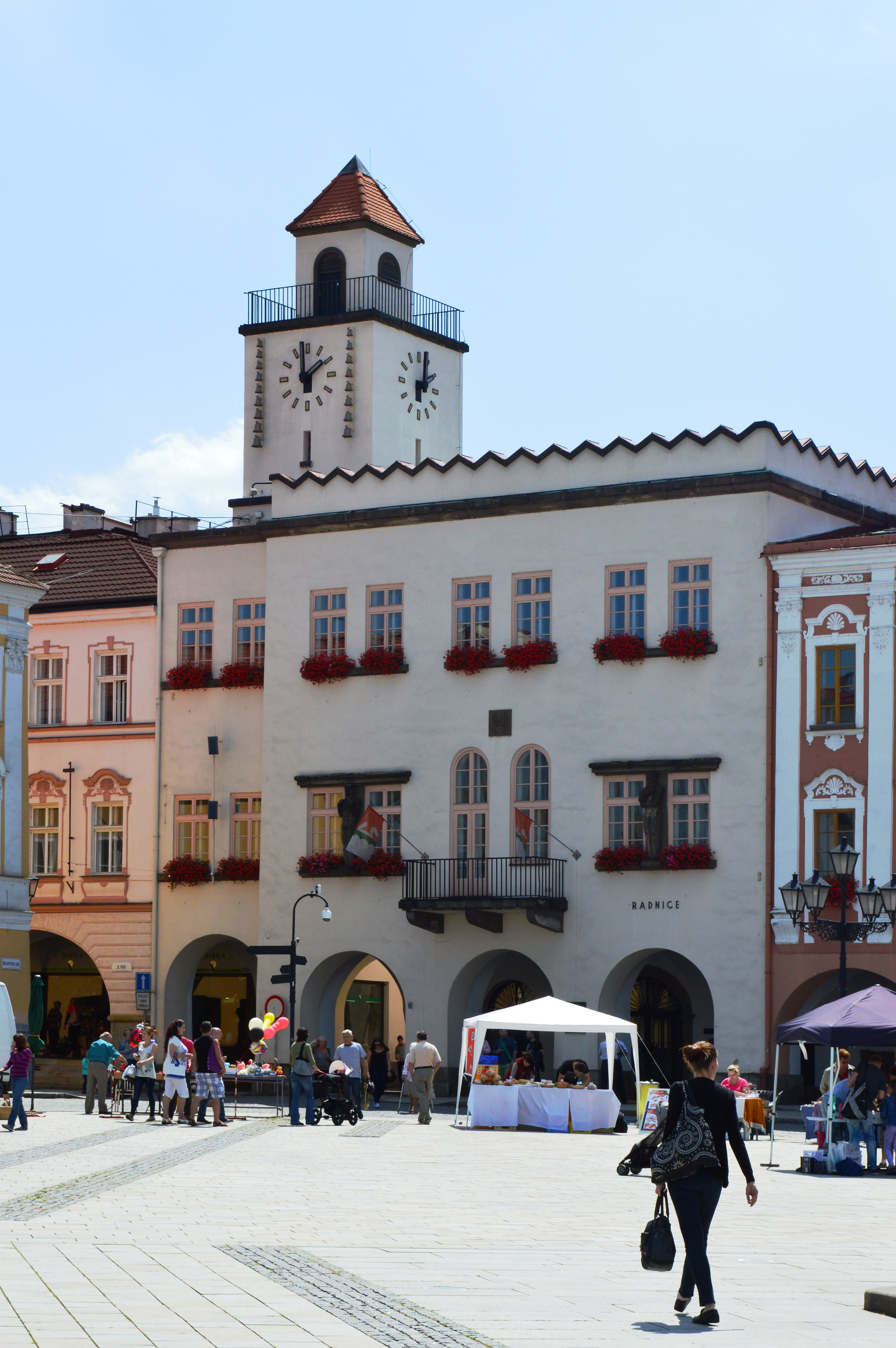
Town hall

Nový Jičín is known for the hat-making industry. Hats have been made here since 1630. The mechanical production began here in 1865 and is the oldest hat factory in the world. The modern TONAK company was established in 1945 and is still one of the three largest headwear manufacturers in the world.

The largest employer with headquarters in the town is Hanon Systems Autopal, a manufacturer of refrigeration and air conditioning components for the automotive industry. The company employs more than 1,000 people.

== Transport ==
Nový Jičín lies on the European route E462. The town lies about 8 km (5 mi) from the station on the high-speed railway line in Suchdol nad Odrou. There is the Nový Jičín–Suchdol nad Odrou railway line of local importance.

The largest airport in the region, Leoš Janáček Airport Ostrava is about 15 kilometres from Nový Jičín.

== Sights ==
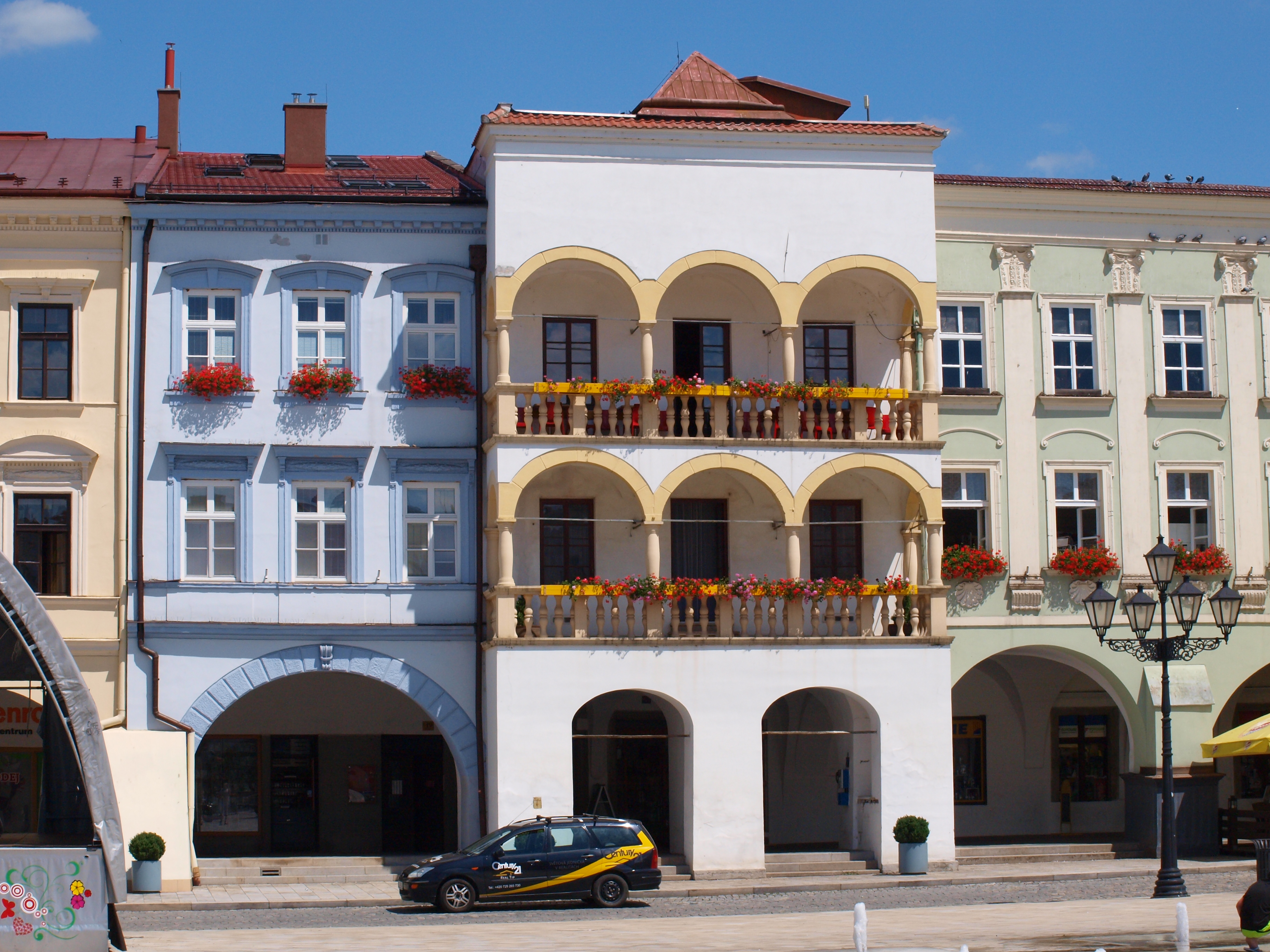
The house Stará pošta

The historic core of Nový Jičín is a Renaissance-Baroque town with a pure example of medieval urbanism of the second half of the 13th century. In its centre is a square with arcades and a rectangular system of adjacent streets. In the 16th century, the arcades were built and the wooden houses were replaced by stone ones.

The town square is lined by preserved Renaissance and Baroque burger houses. The town hall was a Renaissance house from the 16th century, rebuilt to the town hall in 1661. In 1881, the façade was rebuilt and modified in the pseudo-Gothic style. In 1929–1930, an insensitive pseudo-Renaissance reconstruction was made.

The most valuable house is Stará pošta (i.e. 'old post office'), a two-storey Renaissance house from 1563. In a historic house where general Ernst Gideon von Laudon died in 1790 is the tourist information centre and an exposition of the hat-making tradition of Nový Jičín.

The Church of the Assumption of the Virgin Mary is the landmark of the historic centre. It has a Renaissance 66 m (217 ft) high tower from 1587. The original Gothic castle was replaced by the current building by the Jesuits in 1732–1740.

The oldest stone building in Nový Jičín is the Žerotínský Castle from the 1380s. Today it houses the regional museum. Only a bastion from 1613 and few fragments of the town walls are preserved to this day.

== Notable people ==
- Ernst Gideon von Laudon (1717–1790), German-Austrian generalisimo; died here
- Peter von Rittinger (1811–1872), Austrian engineer and inventor
- Dominik Bilimek (1813–1884), Moravian-German naturalist and teacher
- Eduard Veith (1858–1925), Austrian painter
- Otakar Bystřina (1861–1931), writer; lived and worked here
- Adolf Herz (1862–1947), Austrian-Swiss engineer and inventor
- Hugo Baar (1873–1912), Moravian-German landscape painter
- Božena Benešová (1873–1936), writer
- Alfred Neubauer (1891–1980), racing manager
- Fred Liewehr (1909–1993), Austrian actor
- Frederick Tintner (1912–2015), Czech-British soldier
- Max Mannheimer (1920–2016), writer, survivor of the Holocaust
- Vladimír Válek (1935–2025), conductor
- Harun Farocki (1944–2014), German filmmaker and author
- František Černík (born 1953), ice hockey player
- Stanislav Moša (born 1956), theatre and musical director
- Karel Stromšík (born 1958), footballer
- Vlasta Redl (born 1959), folk musician
- Kateřina Konečná (born 1981), politician
- Rostislav Klesla (born 1982), ice hockey player
- Tomáš Sklenák (born 1982), handball player
- Lenka Masná (born 1985), athlete
- Karolína Huvarová (born 1986), fitness trainer and model
- Petra Klosová (born 1986), swimmer
- Karolína Maňasová (born 2003), sprinter

== Twin towns – sister cities ==
Nový Jičín is twinned with:

- Épinal, France
- Görlitz, Germany
- Kremnica, Slovakia
- Ludwigsburg, Germany
- Novellara, Italy
- Świętochłowice, Poland
