= Tomáš Sklenák =

Czech handball player

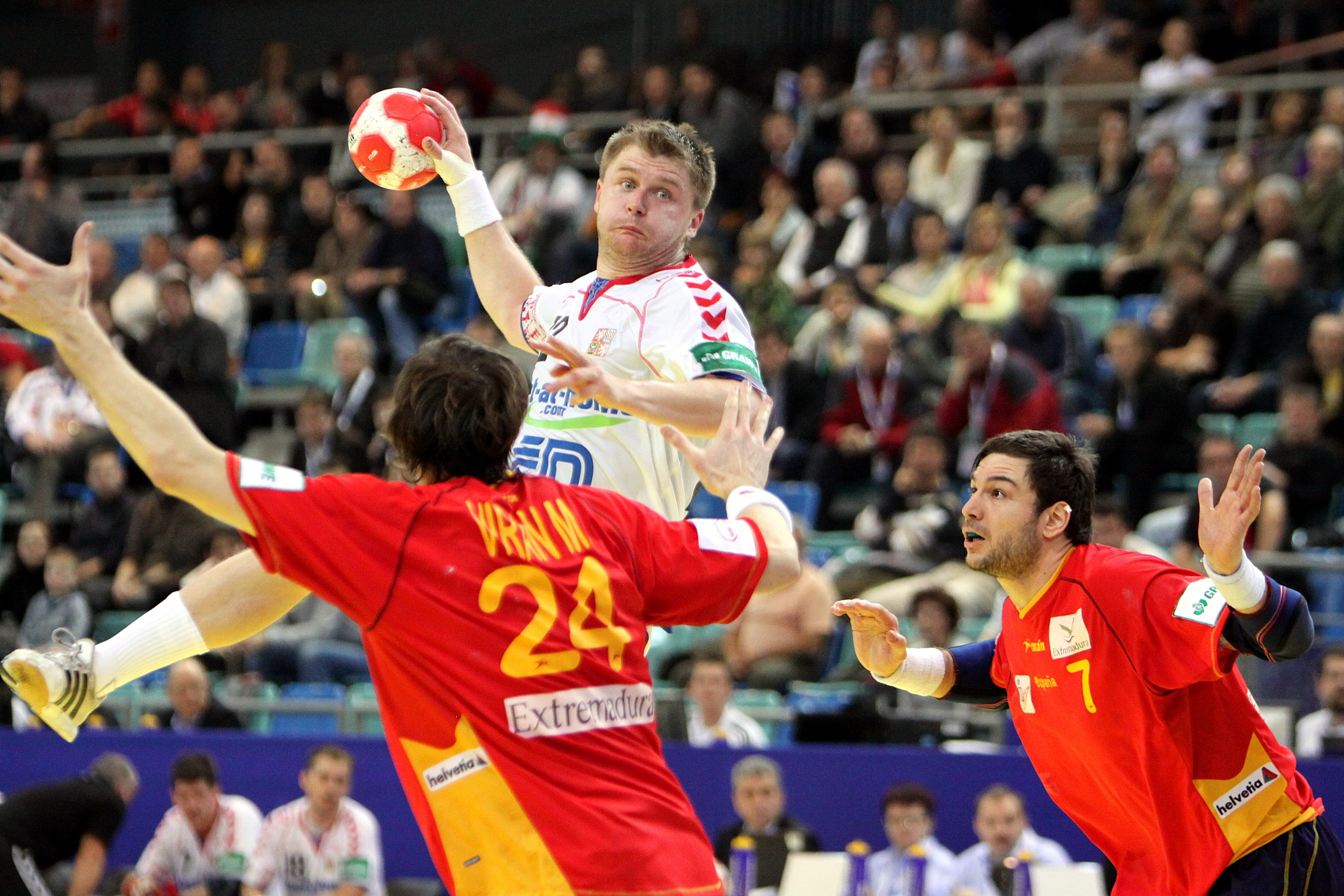

Personal information
- Nationality: Czech
- Born: 2 March 1982 (age 44) Nový Jičín, Czechoslovakia
- Height: 1.86 m (6 ft 1 in)

Sport
- Sport: Handball
- Position: Central back
- Current club: Kh ISMM Kopřivnice
National team
Years	Team	Apps	(Gls)
–	Czech Republic	48	(137)

Tomáš Sklenák (born 2 March 1982) is a Czech handball player for ThSV Eisenach and the Czech national team.
