= Dominik Bilimek =

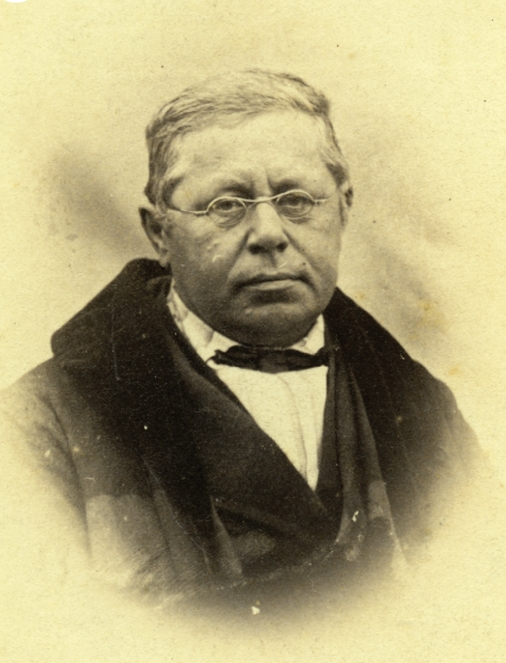
Bilimek in 1864

Dominik Bilimek (born Adolf Josef Bilimek; 25 February 1813 – 3 August 1884) was a Moravian naturalist, teacher and priest. He worked as a museum curator in Mexico and became a pioneer of cave fauna research. He is honored in the names of several insect species including Typhlotrechus bilimeki, Pheidole bilimeki and Euxesta bilimeki. A Mexican bamboo Chusquea bilimekii is also named after him.

== Life and work ==
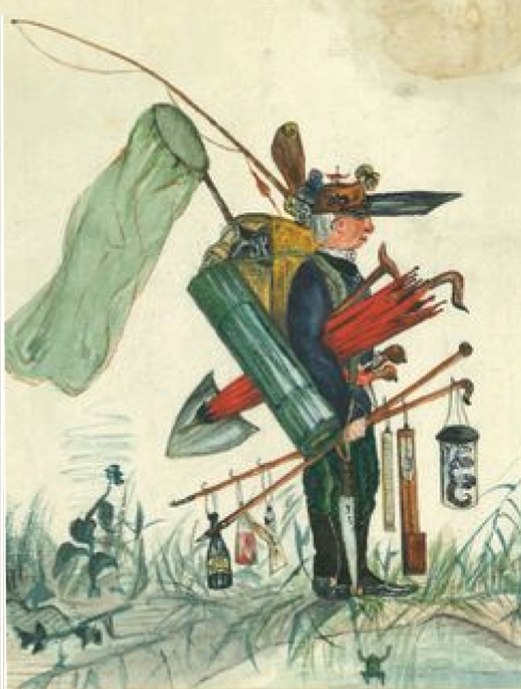
Contemporary caricature of Bilimek the naturalist in the field by Cischini

Bilimek was born in Nový Jičín, Moravia, the son of a butcher in a German speaking Roman Catholic family. He went to local schools before joining the Cistercian Abbey in Wiener Neustadt in 1832 and took his vows in 1836. He became interested in science and took an interest in physics and natural history. After being ordained in 1837 he worked in Wiener Neustadt and later became a pastor at Würflach. He took an interest in the flora and insects of the region. He studied the alpine bog habitats, the Pannonian Steppe, and the flora of the mountains near Hainburg an der Donau. He noted several species including Dracocephalum austriacum near Baden, and Orchis spitzeli in Austria. He travelled widely between 1844 and 1855 to Lake Balaton and the Adriatic Sea. From 1850 he taught natural history at the Wiener Neustadt Gymnasium. He taught natural science at the military academies from 1854 and while in Krakow he worked in the botanical garden. He travelled with Eduard Suess on several trips and Suess described the fossil Terebratula bilimeki in Bilimek's honour. In 1865, he was posted to Mexico City where he worked as a curator at the Imperial Mexican Museum appointed by Archduke Ferdinand Maximilian I (1832–1867). In Mexico he studied cave arthropods in the Grutas de Cacahuamilpa. He returned in 1867 following the execution of Maximilian and subsequently worked at the museum in Miramare Castle near Trieste. He made collecting trips around Europe until 1881 to supplement the museum and then retired to Vienna.

Bilimek collected many specimens and described several new species. Many taxa were named after him including a number of fossils - Euxesta bilimeki, Scaphisoma bilimeki, Metrionella bilimeki (Spaeth, 1932), Joppa bilimeki (Kriechbaumer, 1898), Pheidole bilimeki (Mayr, 1870), Tarache bilimeki (Smith, 1903) and Xiphocentron bilimeki (Brauer, 1870). His natural history collections are now dispersed with many in the Natural History Museum in Vienna, Paris, herbaria in Philadelphia, Harvard and Saint Petersburg.
