= Starý Jičín =

- Municipality
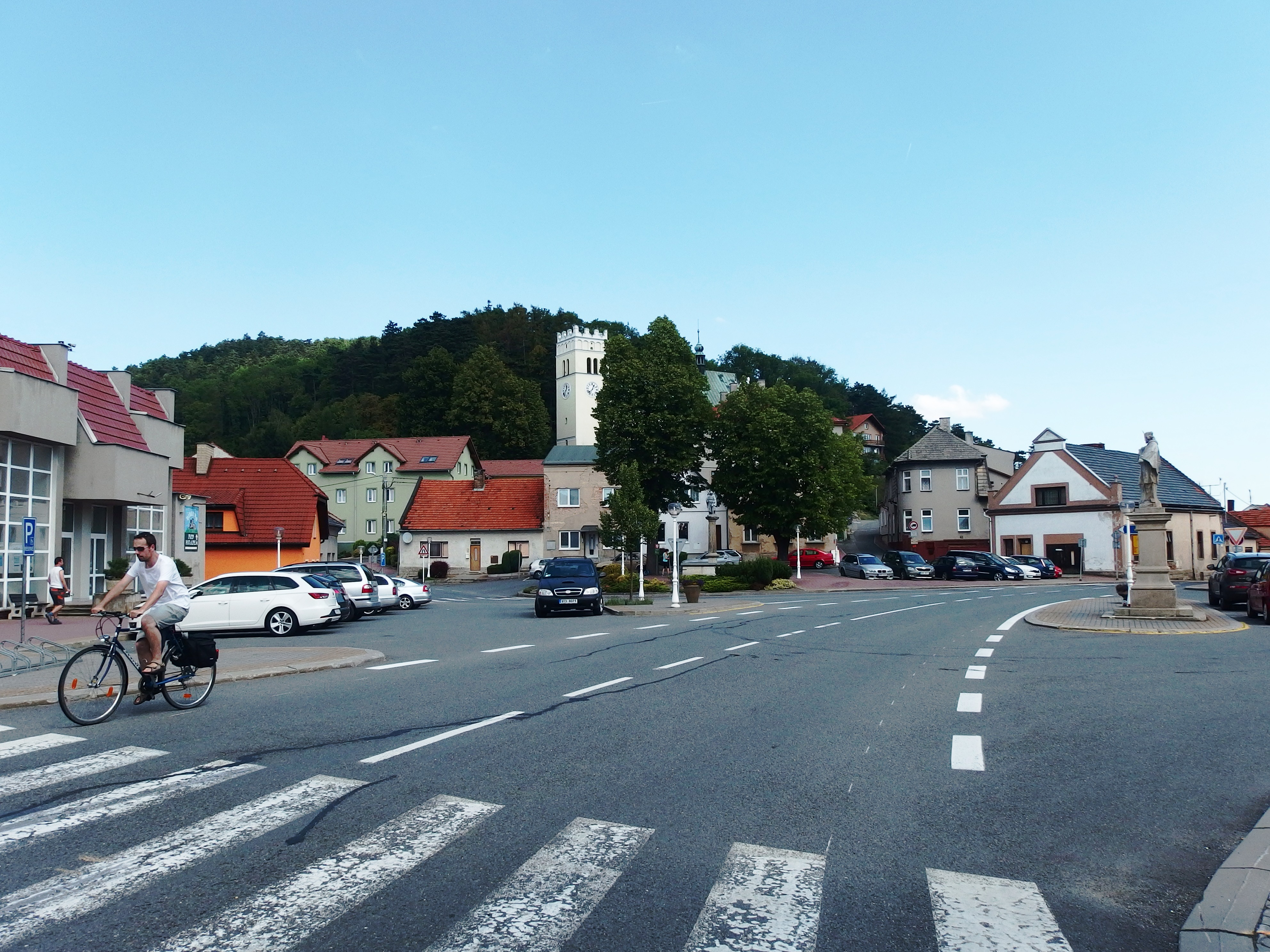
- Square of Starý Jičín

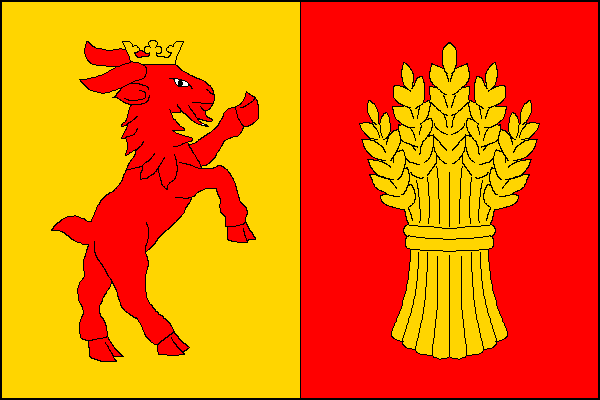
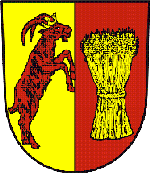
- Flag Coat of arms

- Location in the Czech Republic
- Coordinates: 49°34′37″N 17°57′42″E
- Country: Czech Republic
- Region: Moravian-Silesian
- District: Nový Jičín
- First mentioned: 1240

Area
  - Total: 33.68 km^{2} (13.00 sq mi)
- Elevation: 295 m (968 ft)

Population (2026-01-01)
  - Total: 3,007
  - Density: 89.28/km^{2} (231.2/sq mi)
- Time zone: UTC+1 (CET)
  - Summer (DST): UTC+2 (CEST)
- Postal code: 742 31
- Website: www.stary-jicin.cz

Starý Jičín (Czech pronunciation: [ˈstariː ˈjɪtʃiːn]; German: Alttitschein, Alt Titschein) is a municipality and village in Nový Jičín District in the Moravian-Silesian Region of the Czech Republic. It has about 3,000 inhabitants.

== Administrative division ==
Starý Jičín consists of nine municipal parts (in brackets population according to the 2021 census):

- Starý Jičín (433)
- Dub (119)
- Heřmanice (138)
- Janovice (276)
- Jičina (249)
- Palačov (231)
- Petřkovice (230)
- Starojická Lhota (400)
- Vlčnov (741)

== Geography ==
Starý Jičín is located about 3 kilometres (2 mi) west of Nový Jičín. It lies in the Moravian-Silesian Foothills. The highest point is the mountain Petřkovická hora at 608 m (1,995 ft) above sea level. A dominant feature located just above the village is the hill Starojický kopec at 496 m (1,627 ft).

== History ==
The first written mention of Jičín is from 1240, when the castle was mentioned. The castle was built here in the late 12th or in the early 13th century, originally as a guard castle on the Amber Road. The nearby market village was established soon after the castle.

== Demographics ==
Historical population

Year	Pop.	±%
1869	2,879	—
1880	3,051	+6.0%
1890	3,083	+1.0%
1900	3,164	+2.6%
1910	3,288	+3.9%

Year	Pop.	±%
1921	3,260	−0.9%
1930	3,502	+7.4%
1950	2,769	−20.9%
1961	2,910	+5.1%
1970	2,693	−7.5%

Year	Pop.	±%
1980	2,529	−6.1%
1991	2,392	−5.4%
2001	2,409	+0.7%
2011	2,553	+6.0%
2021	2,817	+10.3%

Source: Censuses

== Transport ==
The I/48 road (the unfinished section of the D48 motorway, part of the European route E462), which connects the D1 motorway with Frýdek-Místek, runs through the municipality.

== Sights ==
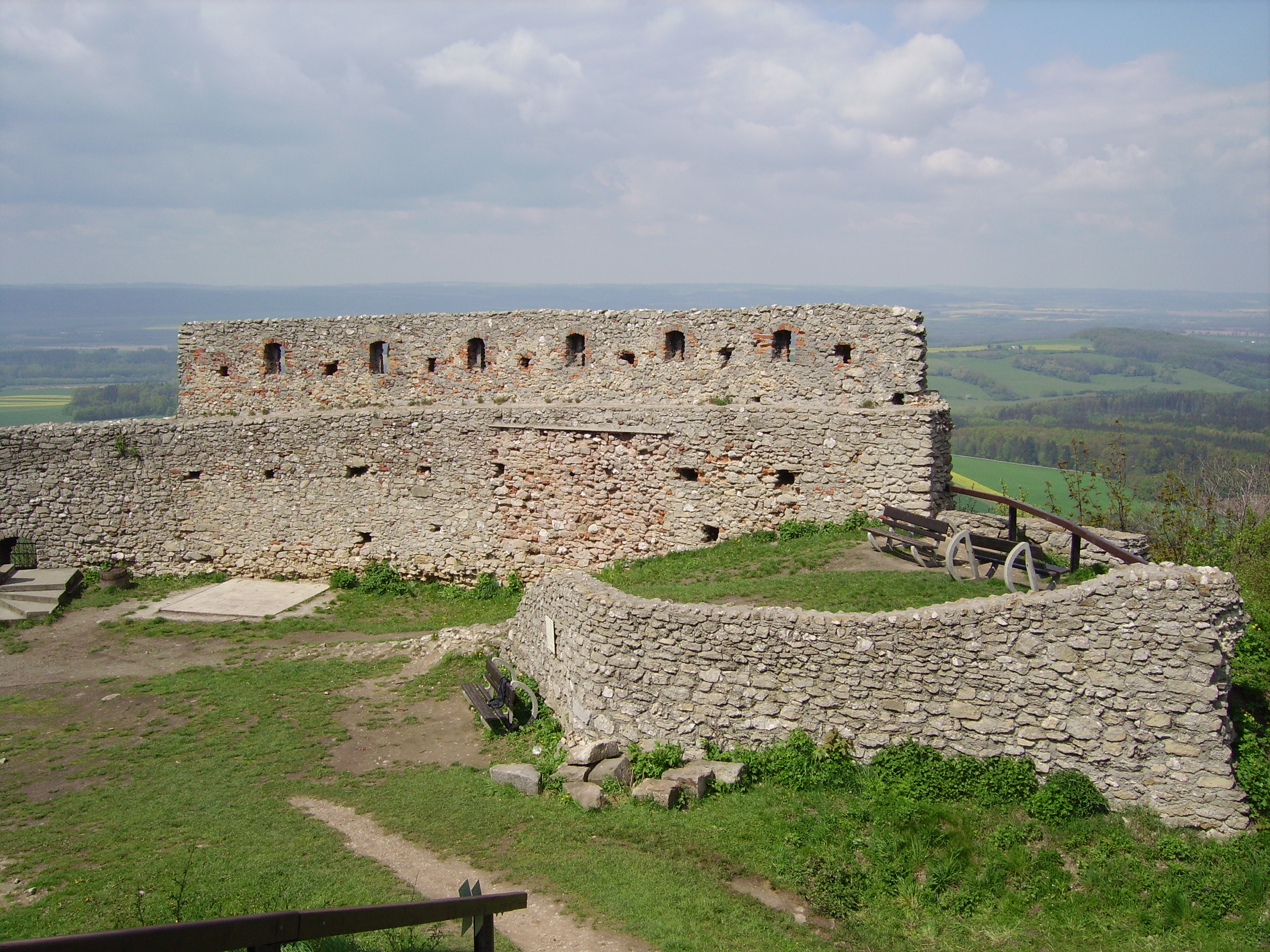
Starý Jičín Castle

The main landmark of the municipality is the Starý Jičín Castle, located on a hill above the village. For centuries, none of the owners cared about the castle and at the beginning of the 20th century, it became a ruin. Since 1996, it has been owned by the municipality and partial repairs were made.

The second notable monument is the complex of the Church of Saint Wenceslaus with a rebuilt Renaissance tower. The church was built in the Gothic style before 1374 and was rebuilt in the Renaissance and Baroque styles in the second half of the 16th century, at the end of the 17th century and in the first quarter of the 18th century.

A landmark of the centre of Starý Jičín is a stone fountain. It was created in the Empire style in 1836. It is decorated with a metal sculpture of a guardian angel.

== Notable people ==
- Max David (1859–?), Moravian-German engineer
