= Robert Wintner =

American novelist

Robert Wintner is an American author and founder of Snorkel Bob's shops throughout Hawaii.

Wintner's fiction tends to be led by characters seeking reason in nature. Two of his novels were optioned for movie production in Los Angeles (The Modern Outlaws and Whirlaway). Whirlaway was a Maui County hot book listing for 15 years.

Snorkel Bob's Reality Guide to Hawaii is non-fiction and written in the same voice as all Snorkel Bob productions, with guidance on snorkel sites, beaches, reefs, hazards et al., and other tourist info.

Wintner has focused on his career as an environmental and animal rights activist, primarily against the saltwater aquarium trade.

== Bibliography ==
=== As Robert Wintner ===
- Wintner, Robert (1999). The Prophet Pasqual. Sag Harbor, NY: Permanent Press. ISBN 1-57962-050-7. OCLC 39354361.
- Wintner, Robert (2000) [1992]. Whirlaway (1st Replica Books ed.). Bridgewater, NJ: Replica Books. ISBN 0-7351-0464-6. OCLC 123096362.
- Wintner, Robert (2000) [1995]. Hagan's Trial and Other Stories (1st Replica Books ed.). Bridgewater, NJ: Replica Books. ISBN 0-7351-0461-1. OCLC 123096337.
- Wintner, Robert (2000) [1995]. Horndog Blue (1st Replica Books ed.). Bridgewater, NJ: Replica Books. ISBN 0-7351-0519-7. OCLC 123096546.
- Wintner, Robert (2001) [1995]. The Ice King (1st Replica Books ed.). Bridgewater, NJ: Replica Books. ISBN 0-7351-0463-8. OCLC 123096359.
- Wintner, Robert (2000). The Modern Outlaws. San Jose: ToExcel. ISBN 0-595-01089-X. OCLC 46720161.
- Wintner, Robert (2000). Homunculus. Sag Harbor, NY: Permanent Press. ISBN 1-57962-062-0. OCLC 61240739.
- Wintner, Robert (2001). Lonely Hearts, Changing Worlds: Short Stories. Sag Harbor, NY: Permanent Press. ISBN 1-57962-028-0. OCLC 44869083.
- Wintner, Robert (2002). Toucan Whisper, Toucan Sing. Sag Harbor, NY: Permanent Press. ISBN 1-57962-076-0. OCLC 47625285.
- Wintner, Robert (2005). In a Sweet Magnolia Time. Sag Harbor, NY: Permanent Press. ISBN 1-57962-123-6. OCLC 41547686.
- Wintner, Robert (2007). Wintner's Reserve, Short Stories. Snorkel Bob Books. ISBN 978-0-9710443-3-3.
- Wintner, Robert (2015). Brainstorm. New York: Yucca Publishing, Imprint of Skyhorse. ISBN 978-1631580208.
- Wintner, Robert (2007). Some fishes I have known : a reef rescue odysseys. New York: Skyhorse Publishing. ISBN 978-1-61608-140-9. OCLC 601093920.
- Wintner, Robert (August 21, 2010). "The Dark Hobby; Can We Stop the Devastating Impact of Home Aquaria on Reefs Worldwide?". Friday Harbor, WA: Sea Shepherd Conservation Society.

=== As Snorkel Bob ===
- Snorkel Bob (1989). Snorkel Bob's Underwater & (get down) Underground Guide to Maui. Snorkel Bob's. ASIN B00072FGYG. OCLC 28822846.
- Snorkel Bob (1990). Snorkel Bob's Underwater & (get down) Underground Guide to Kona and a little bit maybe Hilo. Snorkel Bob's. ASIN B001I7ZHRA. OCLC 28822845.
- Snorkel Bob (1990). Snorkel Bob's Underwater & (get down) Underground Guide to Oahu. Snorkel Bob's. ISBN 1-881334-24-4. OCLC 28822847.
- Snorkel Bob (1993) [1990]. Snorkel Bob's Underwater & (get down) Underground Guide to Kauai. Snorkel Bob's. ISBN 1-881334-25-2. OCLC 28822841.
- Snorkel Bob (2006) [1994]. Snorkel Bob's Reality Guide to Hawaii (5th ed.). Honolulu, HI: Snorkel Bob Books. ISBN 0-9710443-2-5. OCLC 50787840. Formerly Snorkel Bob's Underwater & (get down) Underground Guide to Hawaii
