= Tonatico =

- Municipality
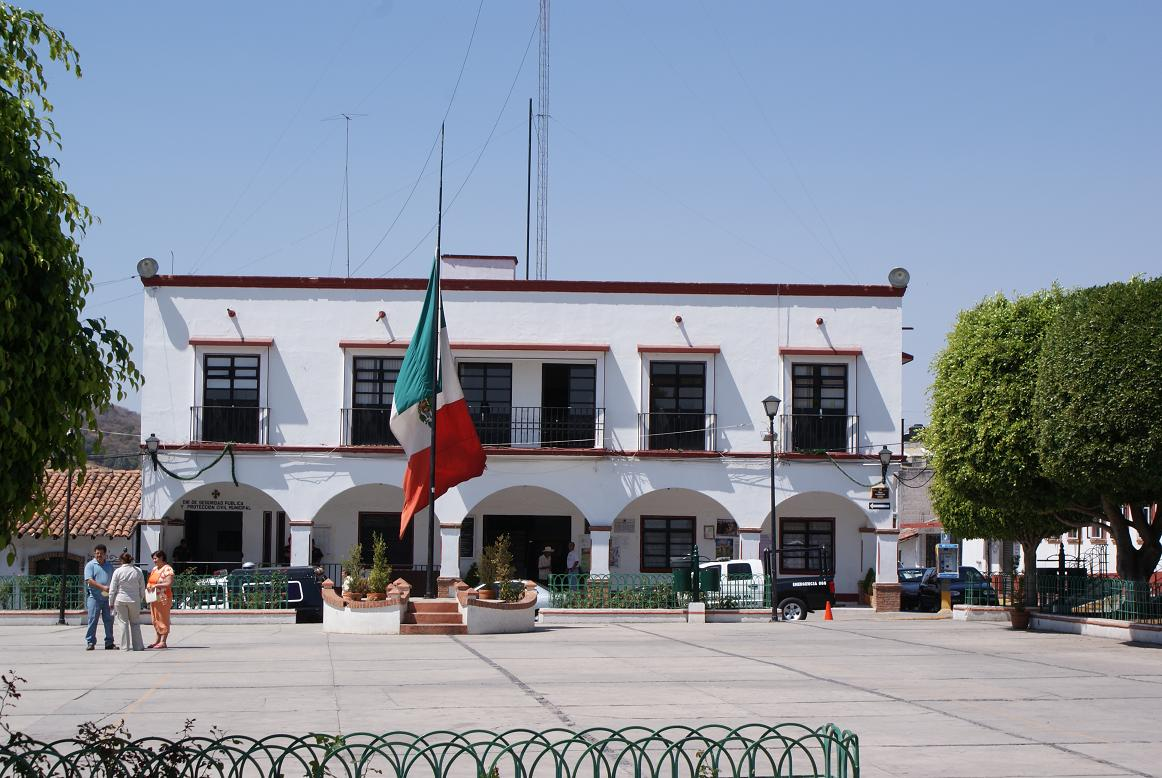
- Town hall

- Coat of arms
- Interactive map of Tonatico
- Coordinates: 18°48′18″N 99°40′09″W
- Country: Mexico
- State: State of Mexico
- Municipal seat: Tonatico
- Largest city: Tonatico

Government
  - Municipal president: Luis Dante Lopez (PAN)
- Time zone: UTC-6 (CST)
- Website: (in Spanish)

Tonatico Municipality is one of the municipalities of the State of Mexico, in Mexico located 153 kilometers from Mexico City, 105 from Cuernavaca, 84 from Toluca, 68 from Taxco and 5 from Ixtapan de la Sal. Tonatico, of Náhuatl origin, is from the Náhuatl word tonatihco, place of the sun.

== History ==
Prehistoric animal remains and cave paintings have been found in the area around the modern town.

According to legend, the Aztec emperor Axayacatl conquered the area, then known as Tenati-Tlan, "behind the walls", which had by that time been populated for a few thousand years, and founded Tonatiuh-Co, which had the same borders as the current town. However, no records of this exist. Tonatiuhco was grouped under a tributary province centered at Ocuilan. The town produced small amounts of high quality salt, which it paid in tribute to the Aztec Empire.

The region had been originally populated by the Matlatzincas and Chontales, but at the time of the Spanish Conquest the area belonged to Tlatoani Axayacatzin of Cuahnahuac (present-day Cuernavaca). In 1521 Hernán Cortés sent Andrés de Castro to keep the local peoples from supporting Cuauhtémoc and to subdue the area. Don Gaspar Alonso, a conquistador, forsook his heritage and sided with the natives of Tonatico, taking on the name of Tlachcolcatcal or Tlacatecutli. He most likely died in the town after the Spanish conquest.

In 1525, the Spanish founded the modern town, modifying the indigenous name to Tonaltinco or Tonaltiunco. A few years later, Franciscan friars came to evangelize the area. At the same time, a statue of the Virgin Mary arrived, now called Our Lady of Tonatico. The miracles this statue was credited with led to conflicts with the nearby town of Ixtapan de la Sal. However, the town eventually came under the control of Ixtapan de la Sal in 1553.

During the Mexican War of Independence, both Hermenegildo Galeana and Pedro Ascencio de Alquisiras were active in this area. In 1863, Don Teodoro Estrada and Don Fructuoso Vázquez fought here against the French. In 1870, the town became the seat of the current municipality of Tonatico, though the territory it then governed was only about half the size of its historical extent. The Liberation Army of the South (Zapatistas) were active here, first burning the municipal library in 1912, attacking federal troops in the main church and ultimately expelling federal troops from the town in 1916. Tonatico's annual Passion Play was inaugurated during Holy Week 1940; in the same year, the Feria del Calvario (Calvary Festival) began to be held, recurring annually on the third Friday in Lent every year. The 1985 Mexico City earthquake also affected this area as well, damaging the Sanctuary of Our Lady, where the statue of Our Lady of Tonatico is housed.

== Municipal seat ==
Tonatico has had a number of notable residents. Teodoro Estrada was born in the nearby town of Zumpahuacan in the State of Mexico. He fought against the French alongside Porfirio Diaz and his performance on the battlefield won him the rank of colonel. Porfirio Diaz had him murdered in Tenancingo. Brigadier General Domitilo Ayala Arenas was born on May 12, 1885, in La Audiencia, Tonatico. He fought with the Liberation Army of the South, next to Emiliano Zapata. He died February 12, 1932, in Mexico City. Don Sebastián Lealba was born in Tonatico on February 26, 1830, and died in Tetipac, Guerrero. He was the leader of the movement which gained municipal independence for Tonatico on April 26, 1908. There is a bust of Don Sebastián in the municipal hall.

Notable landmarks in Tonatico include:

- The house of Gaspar Alonso dating from the late 17th century.
- The remains of a mill for wheat, on the farm of San Miguel from the 17th century.
- The ruins of the first houses that were constructed, the majority of which are on Francisco Javier Mine Street, dating from the 17th century.
- The remains of old stone bridges on the San Jerónimo River, probably from the 16th century.
- A stone bridge constructed on San Jerónimo, which is still in good condition.
- A sundial in pink stone, which today can be found on the arch of the north front door to the vestibule of the church.
- The Sanctuary of Our Lady of Tonatico, which began construction in 1650 and is still in use.
- A chapel dedicated to El Niño de la Azucena, built in 1948.
- A chapel to the El Señor de la Agonía (Our Lord of Agony), built in 1956.
- The Chapel of the Calvary, which has been expanded and remodelled in recent decades

The population of the town as of 2010 was 7,565 people.

== Geography ==
As the municipal seat, the town of Tonatico has governing jurisdiction over the following communities: La Audiencia, Ojo de Agua, La Puerta de Santiago, El Rincón, Salinas, San Bartolo, Los Amates (San José de los Amates), San Miguel, El Terrero, Tlacopan, La Vega, El Zapote and Colixtlahuacán. The municipality of Tonatico borders on those of Ixtapan de la Sal, Pilcaya, Zumpahuacan, Villa Guerrero and the state of Guerrero to the south. The municipality of Tonatico spans 91.724 km^{2}. The population of the municipality as of 2010 was 12,099.

The rate of population growth is very low, growing only 3.61% from 1970 to 1980 and even less (0.51%) from 1990 to 1995. The number of births in the municipality in 1996 was 280; in 1997, 290 and in 1998 only 84. The average family size is five.

Tonatico has several nearby mountains, including La Cruz and Tapachichi. The largest is La Puerta at 1,685 meters of elevation. The Salto de Zumpantitlán waterfall is nearby, along with the Tenancingo, San Geronimo and Taplalla rivers.

The main economic activity is agriculture, particularly corn, which is grown on over 2,300 hectares. Another major crop is onions, which are sown on 750 hectares, and on a smaller scale can be found cucumbers, beans, tomatoes, chiles, alfalfa and flowers. The municipality has little to no industry, but attracts tourism due to its thermal springs. Another key activity is mining.

According to INEGI, in 1995, Tonatico had 2,258 households in total. Within these, 1,605 had potable water, another 1,880 had sewer connections and 2,164 had electrical power.

Remains of pre-Hispanic animals have been found in the nearby area, as well as caves with cave paintings within ravines. Artifacts from pre-Hispanic peoples include ixtamiles, temazcales, tanks, pots and channels.

In Tecomatepec there are several clay whistles which are used to entertain the children. Some people make reed flutes. The ayacachtli or rattle make of "bules", "cirianes", "socos", or another objects that sound when shaken.
