= Frederick Tintner =

- Tinter at his wedding in 1943
- Born: Bedrich Tintner; 15 June 1912; Nový Jičín, Austria-Hungary
- Died: 19 March 2015 (aged 102)
- Spouse: Ruth Tintner

Bedřich "Frederick" Tintner (15 June 1912 – 19 March 2015) was a Czech-British soldier. He escaped the Gestapo during the World War II and served in the British, Czech and Soviet armed forces. He took part in the Battle of the Dukla Pass.

== Family ==
Tintner's parents, sister, and a brother, along with many other relatives, all were murdered in the Auschwitz concentration camp. Tintner married a woman named Ruth in Norwich on 27 February 1943. After the war, Tintner and his family settled in Denham, England, where he started a textile import business. He became a British citizen in 1948. He died on 19 March 2015 at the age of 102.

== Military career ==
In September 1944 Soviet forces began a campaign to take over Czechoslovakia from the Germans. Serving in the 1st Czechoslovak Army Corps (Commanded by General and future president of Czechoslovakia Ludvík Svoboda); and fought in the Battle of Dukla Pass. By October of the same year, Tintner became in charge of the 1st Bn Czechoslovak Brigade.
