= Grutas de Cacahuamilpa National Park =

Park in Mexico featuring cave systems and underground rivers

- IUCN category II (national park)
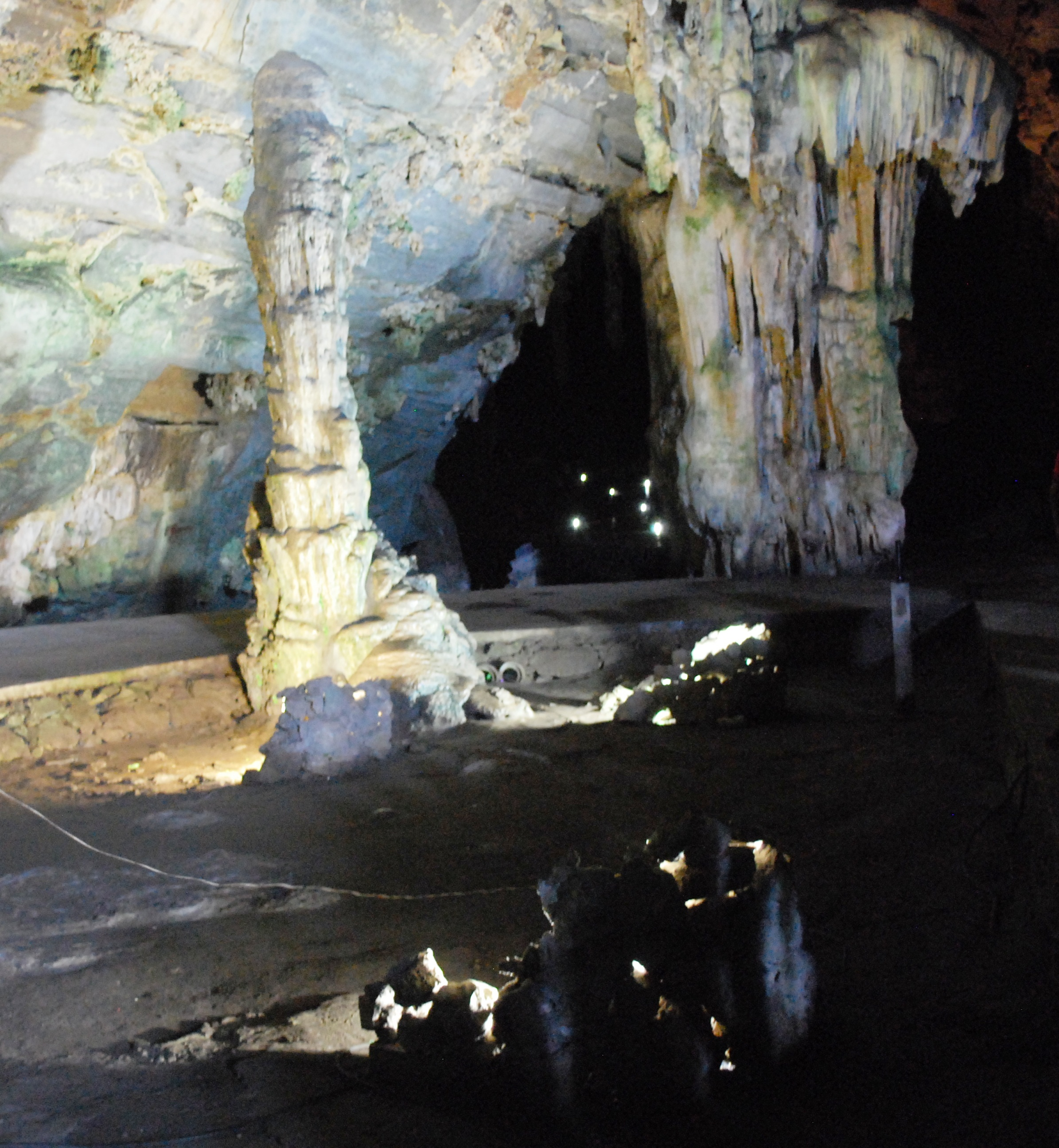
- One of the formations in the Grutas de Cacahuamilpa

- Location within Mexico
- Interactive map of Grutas de Cacahuamilpa National Park
- Location: Guerrero / Morelos, Mexico
- Nearest city: Taxco, Guerrero
- Coordinates: 18.66962°N 99.50991°W
- Area: 1,600 hectares (4,000 acres)
- Established: April 23, 1936
- Governing body: Secretariat of the Environment and Natural Resources

The Grutas de Cacahuamilpa National Park in the Mexican state of Guerrero, Mexico, is best known for the Grutas de Cacahuamilpa Caverns. It is also home to the Grutas of Carlos Pacheco, a smaller system, as well as two subterranean rivers which have carved out tunnels in the rock. The park has outdoor pursuit attractions such as rappelling, and rock climbing in Limontitla Canyon. as well as the two underground rivers to explore. It also has a small botanical garden, a pool and places to camp.

== Geography ==
The park is located in the Sierra Madre del Sur mountains, primarily in the northeast part of the state of Guerrero. This section of the Sierra Madre del Sur is made of rock, mostly limestone, that was formed under oceans millions of years ago. The caverns extend through the municipalities of Pilcaya, Tetipac and Taxco in Guerrero, and extend into the municipality of Coatlán del Río in the state of Morelos. The parks extends over 2,700 hectares of land, and is located southwest of Mexico City, near the silversmithing town of Taxco.

This is the best known cave system in Mexico, and popular for caving. The park is visited by about 350,000 people annually, generating an income of about 8 million pesos each year.

== Grutas de Cacahuamilpa ==
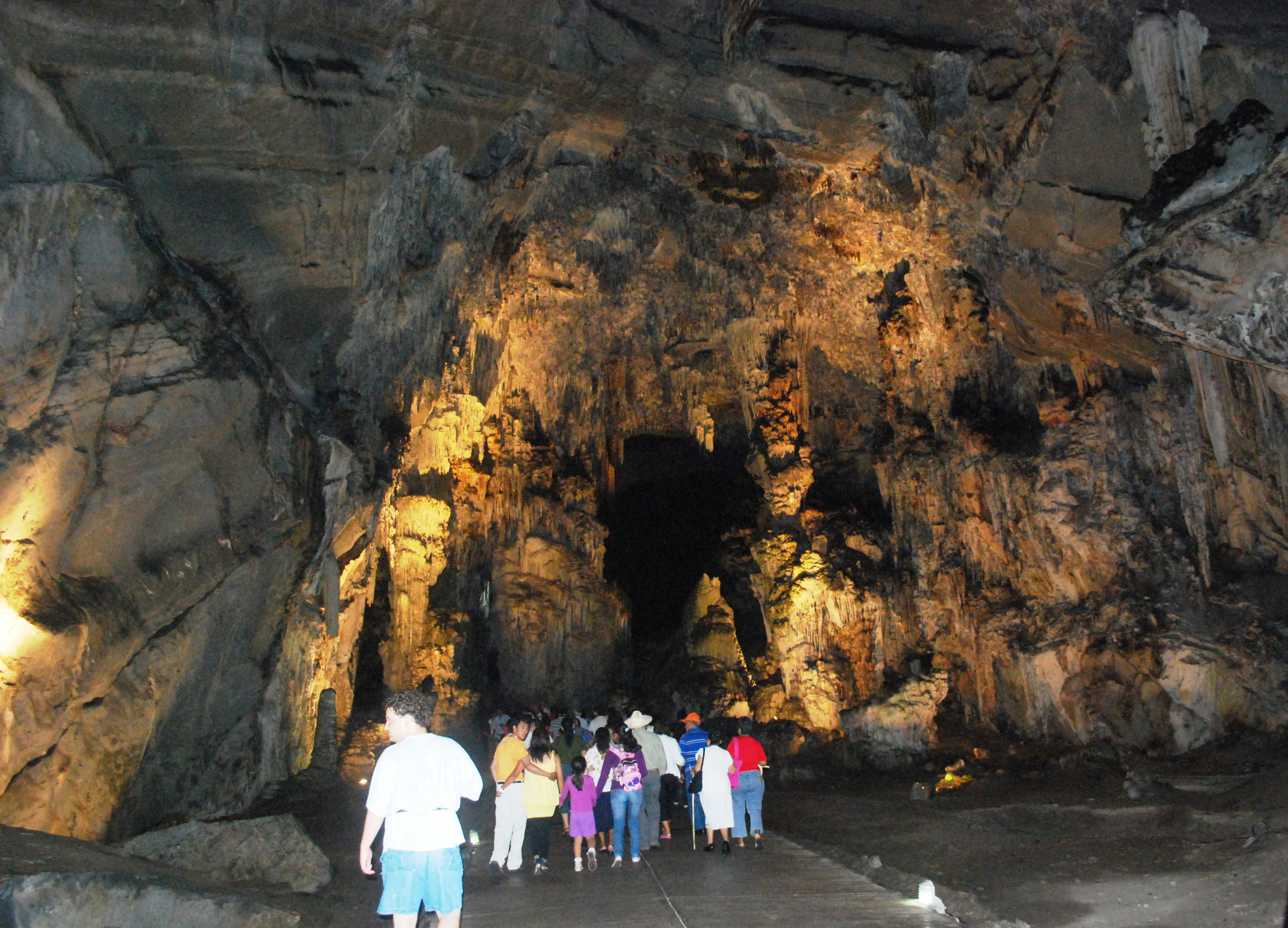
Passing through one of the salons of the caverns

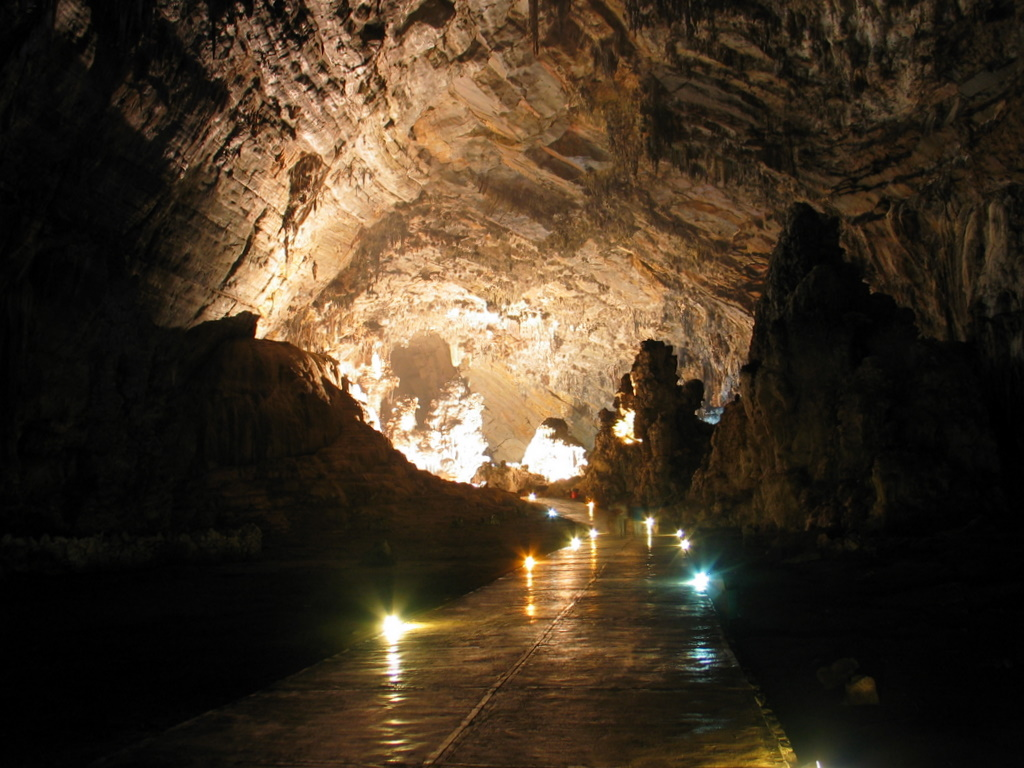
One of the main corridors of the caves

Cacahuamilpa is one of the largest cave systems in the world. It is a "live" cave system, meaning that groundwater still filters down into it, and that the formations there are still growing. Inside the cavern system are ninety large "salons" separated by large natural rock walls and connected to one another via a central gallery. However, only about twenty of these are fully explored and open to the public. Most of these salons are located under the Cerro de la Corona, a limestone mountain ridge. The publicly-open portion is essentially a two-km-long, level passage of linked “salons” or borehole openings. These salons average about forty meters wide, and vary in height from twenty to 81 meters. Most have names which reflect the major formations found in them such as the Goat Salon, the Throne Salon and the Cathedral Salon. All the openings have numerous rock formations growing from both the ceiling and the floor. One of the drier salons has been dubbed the “Auditorium”. It has a large flat floor and has been outfitted with seats. It is rented out for events, and has been the site for a number of concerts including one in 2007 by Miguel Bosé and one by the Acapulco Philharmonic Orchestra in 2009.

Tours of the open cave system run every hour and last about two hours. On the walkway to the entrance there are a couple of amate trees (Ficus insipida) with their roots wound around the rocky walls of Limontitla Canyon. The entrance is a large arch about forty meters wide and twelve meters tall. From the entrance, one descends about twenty meters to the level of the caverns. The path has a mostly level cement walkway, and there is artificial illumination on both the path and parts of the salons. However, since it is a live cave, the high humidity can make the trek uncomfortable for some people.

At least parts of the cave system have been known for centuries, and parts have been occupied since pre-Hispanic times. Excavations in the caverns have produced fragments of pottery. This area was home to the Olmec people, and later the Chontal tribe. Both peoples used the caves for ceremonial purposes. The original name of the caves was “Salachi”. The current name, “Cacahuamilpa”, comes from a location near the cave entrance and means “peanut field”.

After the Conquest, the existence of the caves was kept hidden from the Spaniards by the indigenous peoples. Credit for the “discovery” of the caves is given to Manuel Sainz de la Peña Miranda, who used the caves in 1834 to hide from Spanish authorities, which prompted a thorough search of the area. In 1866, Dominik Bilimek and Maximiliano von Habsburg made the first biospeleological visit to the cave. F. Bonet surveyed and mapped the cave up to 1,380 meters in 1922 and it was opened to the public during that decade. The first scientific expedition to the caves was organized by the Secretary of the French Legation in 1935, and the national park was established in 1936 by President Lázaro Cárdenas. Guided tours began in 1969, and a second survey in 1987 established the cave system’s length at between four and five kilometers.

In one of the salons is a gravesite. The story behind this grave is that an Englishman got lost exploring the cave and eventually died of starvation. He was accompanied by a dog, which he sent to get aid. However, no one on the outside paid any attention to the dog, so it returned to the cave to die along with its master. When the remains were found, they were buried there with rock and a simple cross.

== Grutas de Carlos Pacheco ==
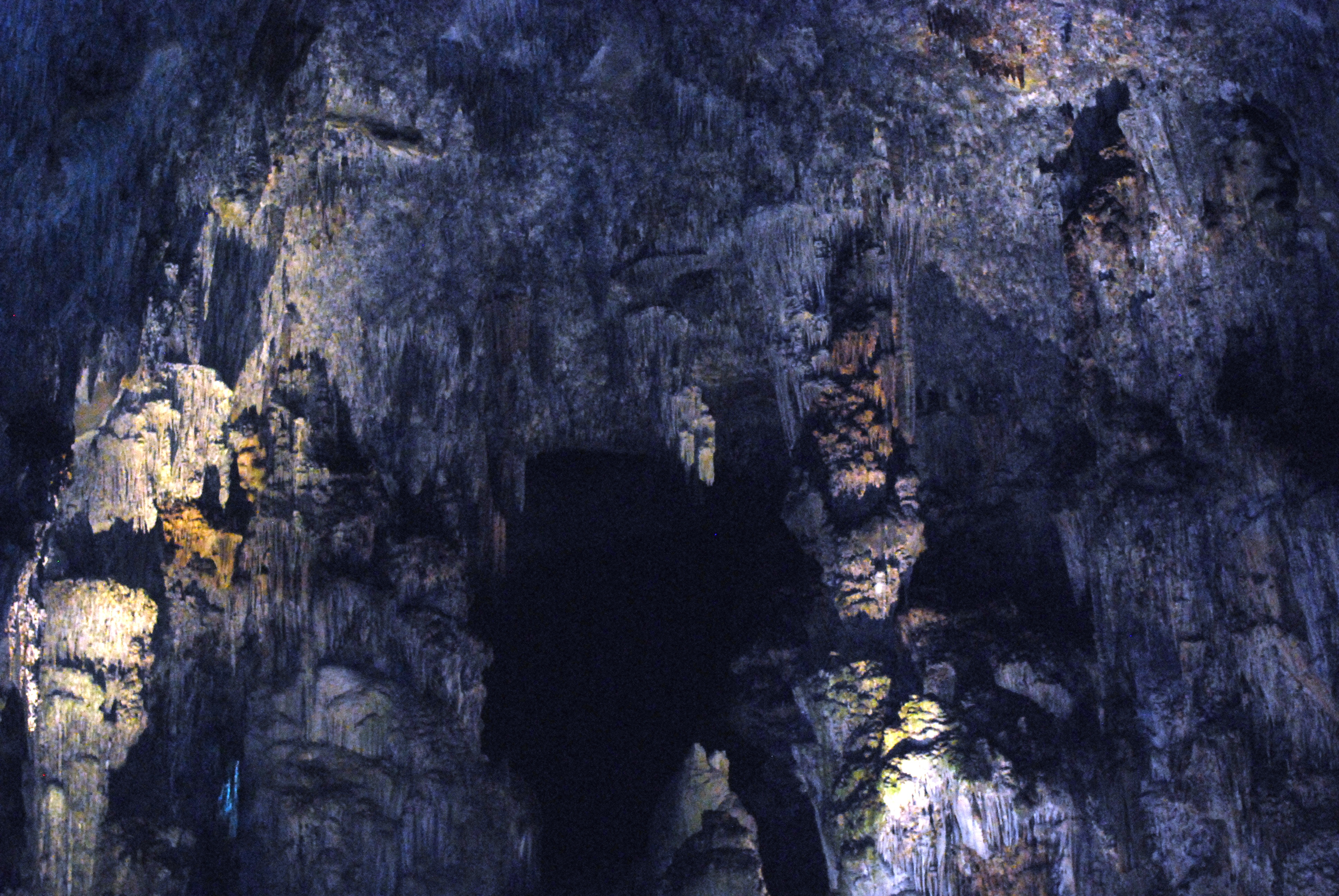
One of the examples of stalactite

The Grutas de Carlos Pacheco are located 400 meters to the south of the Grutas de Cacahuamilpa. They were named after Mexican General Carlos Pacheco, who fought against the French Intervention in Mexico. Just beyond the entrance the cave divides into two branches. The infiltration of water into these caverns is minimal and parts are entirely dry. For this reason, this is considered to be a fossilized cave. The stalagmites and stalactites here stopped forming hundreds of years ago. However, a number of these formation are very uncommon and some seem to defy gravity. These caves can be visited by arranging a tour separate from the tour of the Cacahuamilpa Caverns.

== Other features of the park ==
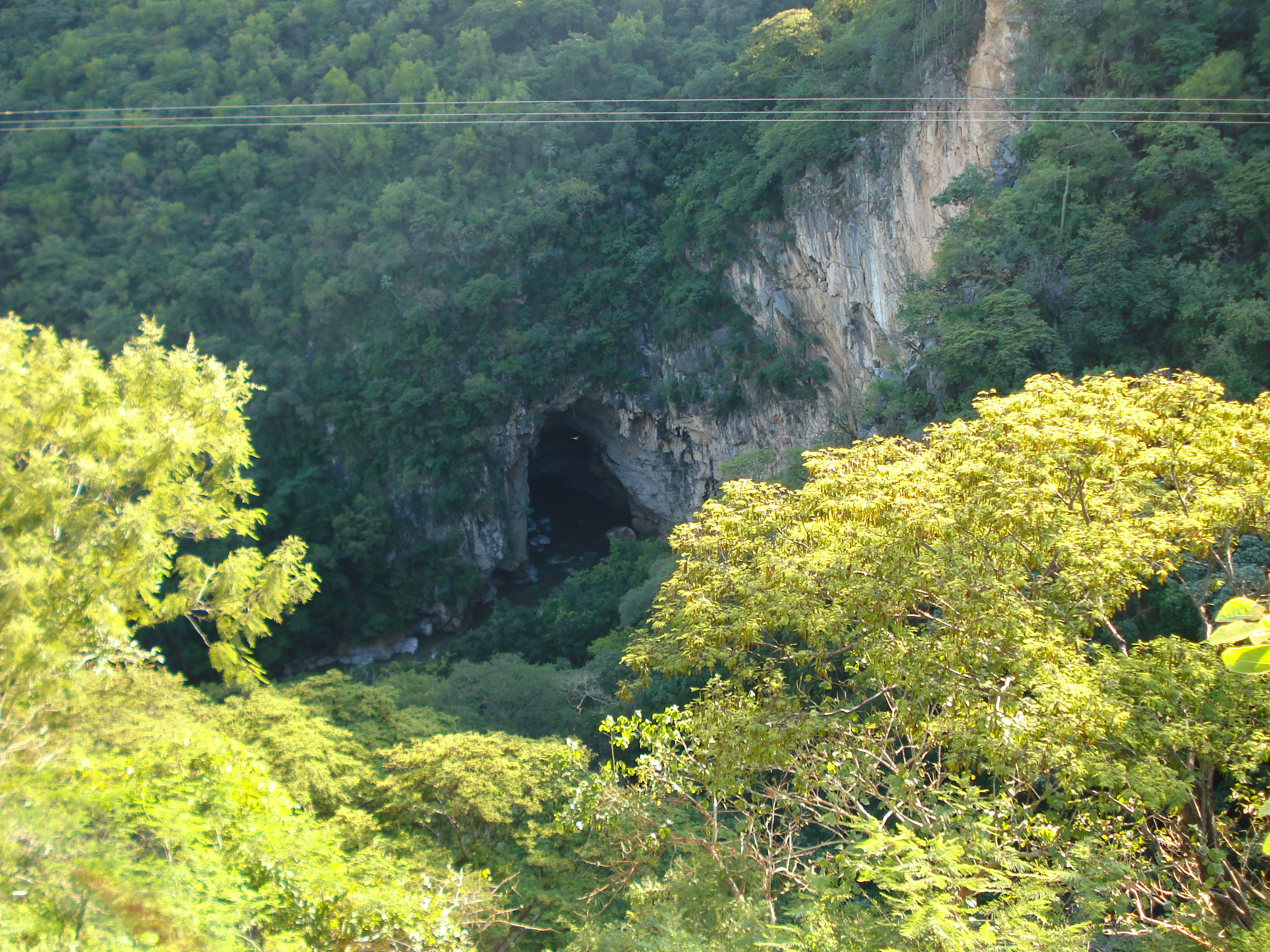
Entrance to the Cacahuamilpa Caves

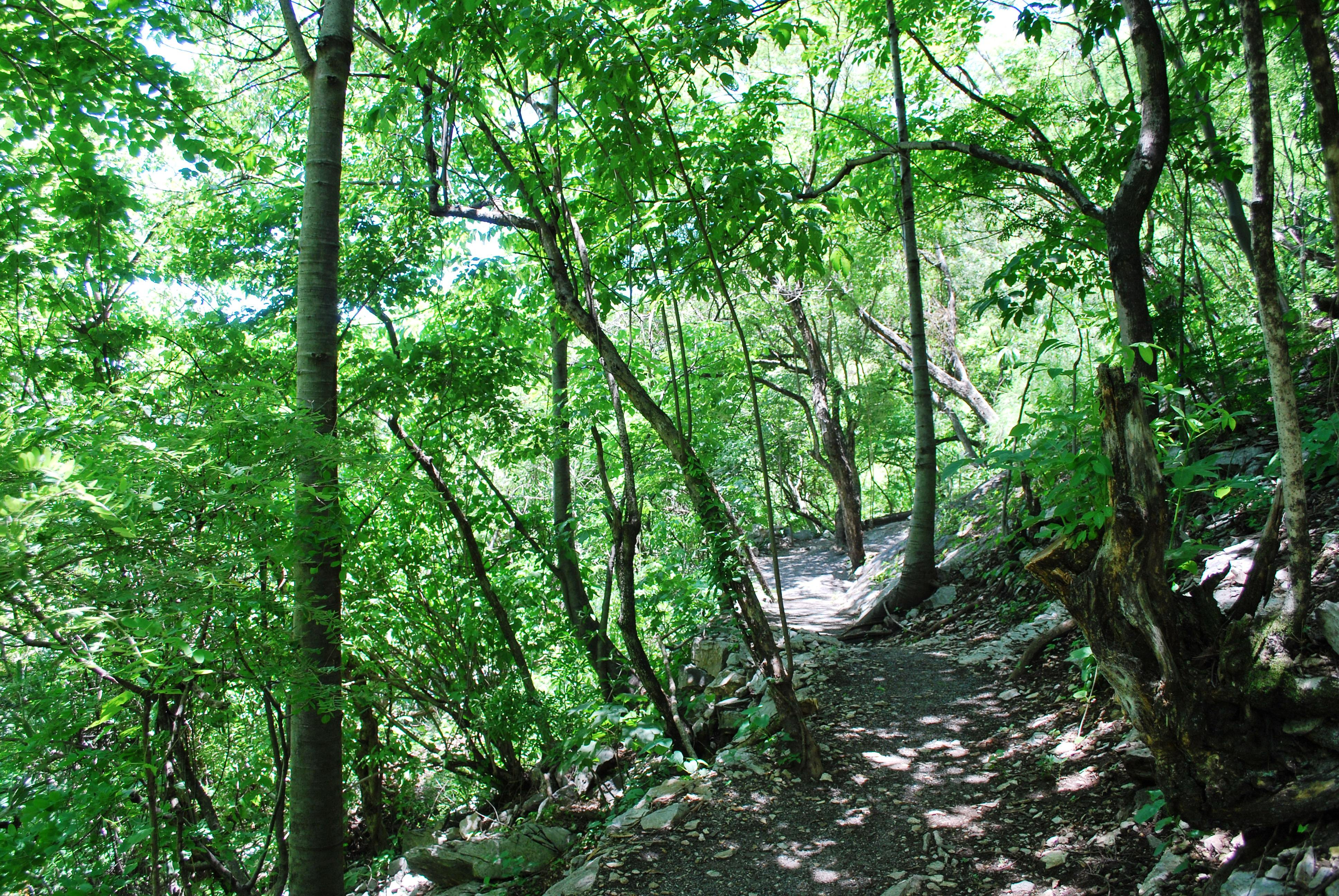
Limontitla Botanical Garden outside the caverns

The park has two underground rivers called the Chontalcoatlán, which is eight km long, and the San Jeronimo, which is 12 km long. The tunnels that have been formed by these rivers are still completely active, as the water continues to cut away little by little at the rock. Both have areas with rocks and sandy beaches on each side and the darkness is complete in much of the tunnels’ lengths. The San Jeronimo River has its origins in natural springs that lie in San Pedro Zictepec, Mexico State. The walls of the cavity in which it flows are up to eighty meters high. It is possible for visitors to explore this river, which requires about seven hours to do so; however, it is the easier of the two to explore as it is more level. The waters of the Chontalcoatlán originate from the Nevado de Toluca. Its descent underground has carved out an entrance fifty meters high. It is also possible to visit this natural tunnel although it is necessary to get to the entrance by vehicle. It is relatively easy to travel to a point called La Caraboya or La Ventana. However, after this point, the river descends steeply and those not in good physical condition are not advised to continue. Just after the two rivers reemerge above ground, they join to form the Amacuazac River, which is a tributary of the Balsas River.

Rock climbing in this park is highly recommended by the Squamishrock rock climbing club. They describe it as having “collapse followed by several long, full of tufas, stalactites and Chorreras ... (Route 7 Mala Fama has long run the vast bovedon's Chanchullo ...) “ There are 45 rock climbing routes with grades from 10b to 13d of. Route types are desplome and techo and the rocks are mostly limestone with stalactites.

The Limontitla Botanical Garden exists to demonstrate the native flora that exists in this subtropical, mostly deciduous forest. Tours of the garden can be done alone or with a guide to explain the species on display here. The best time to visit the garden is during the rainy season (approx. June to October) when everything is green and in bloom.

The park also has a large swimming pool located in a point that overlooks the place where the San Jeronimo and Chontalcoatlán Rivers meet to form the Amacuazac.

== Popular culture ==
Parts of the movies Macario and Tarzan and the Valley of Gold were filmed at the caverns.
