= Ixtapan de la Sal =

- Town & Municipality
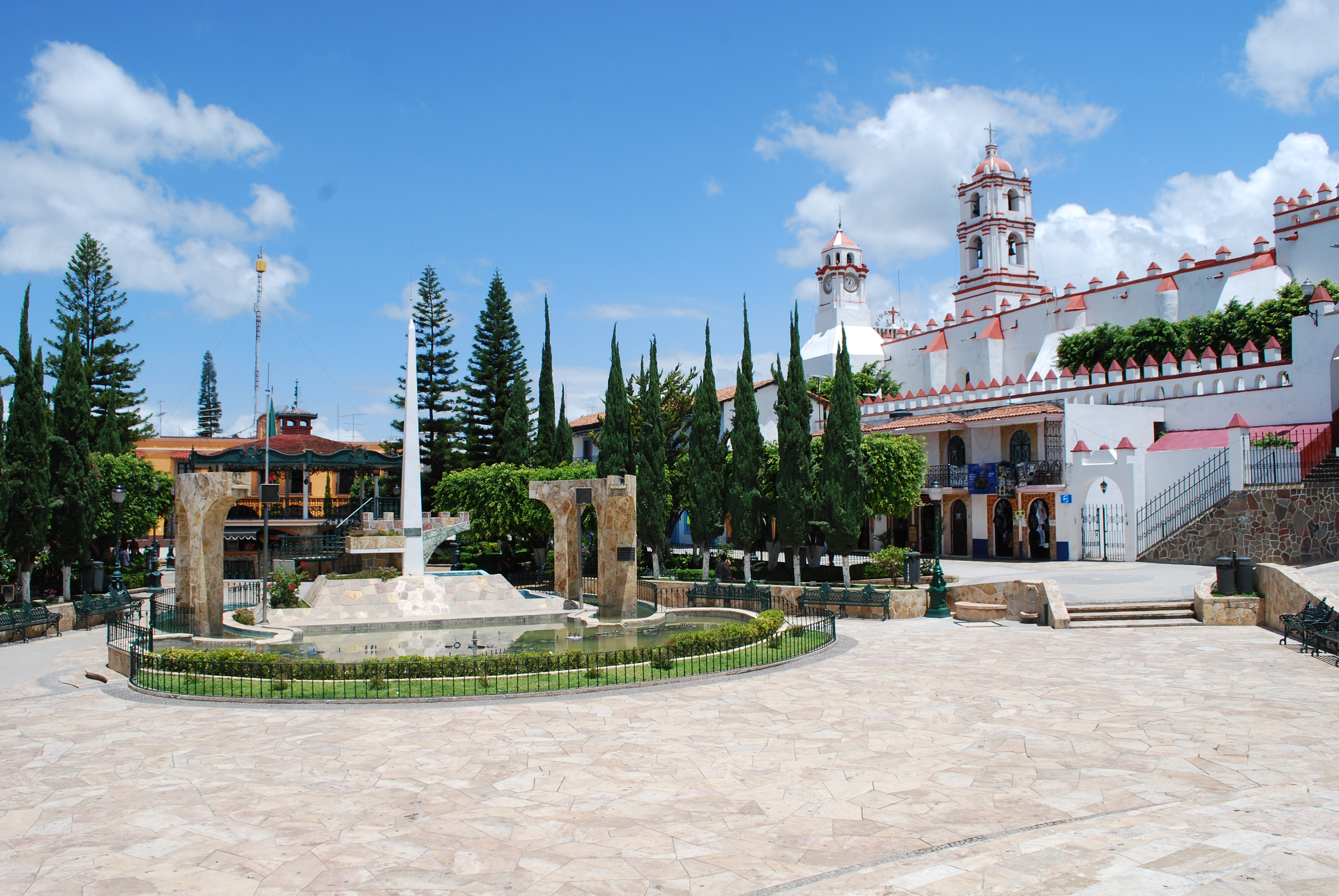
- Main plaza with church

- Coat of arms
- Interactive map of Ixtapan de la Sal
- Coordinates: 18°50′N 99°41′W
- Country: Mexico
- State: State of Mexico
- Municipal Status: 1822

Government
  - Municipal President: Edgar Misael Ocampo Ayala (2022-2024)
- Elevation (of seat): 1,880 m (6,170 ft)

Population (2010) Municipality
  - Municipality: 33,541
  - Seat: 15,383
- Time zone: UTC-6 (Central)
- Postal code (of seat): 51900
- Website: www.edomexico.gob.mx/ixtapandelasal (in Spanish)

Ixtapan de la Sal is a town and municipality located in the State of Mexico, Mexico. It is 60km (37 miles) south of Toluca, the state's capital, and 120km (75 miles) south of Mexico City by the Federal Road 55. The word Ixtapan comes from Nahuatl. There are two theories as to the origin of the name. The first theory states that it is composed of iztal, which means 'salt', and pan, which means 'over' or 'in'. The second states that it comes from iztac which means 'white'; atl, which means 'water'; and pan, meaning 'over' or 'in'; giving the meaning 'in white waters'. The phrase de la Sal is Spanish for 'of salt'.

There are two rivers in Ixtapan de la Sal. Salado River flows from the east with a year-round current, while the Salitre River flows from the northwest with a seasonal current. An aqueduct also passes through the city. Most relevant to tourists is the carbonated water of La Laguna Verde, a spring that filters from the subsoil, sprouting naturally in the form of water eruptions.

On January 22, 1981, Ixtapan de la Sal officially became a city. In 1996, Ixtapan de la Sal was included in Mexico's '100 Ciudades Coloniales' program, a government initiative recognizing cities of historical significance and colonial heritage.

== Tourism ==
Tourism has become a significant sector of Ixtapan de la Sal's economy, with visitors drawn to natural hot springs and thermal spas. Several hotel chains operate accommodations near the springs, including Ixtapan Spa Hotel and Golf Resort, Marriott Ixtapan de la Sal, and Hotel Rancho San Diego Grand Spa Resort.

Parque Acuático Ixtapan is a local water park featuring thermal spring spas, areas for children and families, as well as water rides. The park includes green spaces and a miniature train for visitors. The park also has an expanse of green area with a small train that tours it.

La Asunción de María, a church constructed during the 16th century by Spanish conquistadors, is situated in the downtown area, near the town hall and the Plaza de los Mártires (Martyrs' Square, also known as Jardin central). The plaza is home to the Monument to the Martyrs and several buildings dating to the early 20th century.

A point of interest is the Arturo San Roman Boulevard; within a few miles' stretch are several large sculptures. The first, at the entrance of the town, is the Iztapancihuatl (goddess from thermal water). There is also a water fountain depicting Diana Cazadora. Also within this area is the Monumento a los Mártires de Ixtapan (Monument to the Martyrs of Ixtapan), which honours the residents of Ixtapan killed in a 1912 battle against Zapatista forces.

Located fifteen kilometers from the town, Las Grutas de la Estrella are caverns that have been formed by the dissolving of limestone by groundwater seeping from the Chontalcuatlan and San Jeronimo rivers. These caverns are filled with stalactites and stalagmites of various colors.

In September 2015, the town received recognition for the federal program Pueblos Mágicos.

== The municipality ==
As municipal seat, the town of Ixtapan de la Sal has governing jurisdiction over the following communities: Ahuacatitlán, Barrio Santa Ana, Coaxusco, Colonia Juárez, Colonia la Joya Tres de Mayo Lindavista, El Arenal de las Ollas, El Colorín, El Refugio, El Rincón de Dios Yerbas Buenas, El Salitre, Ixtamil, La Falda, Llano de la Unión, Llano de San Diego, Los Naranjos, Malinaltenango (Manila), Mesón Nuevo, Plan de San Miguel, Portezuelos Dos, Portezuelos Uno (San Andrés), Puerta Grande (Puerta de los Fresnos), Rancho San Diego, San Alejo, San Diego Alcalá (San Diego), San José del Arenal (El Arenal), San Miguel Laderas (San Miguel), San Pedro Tlacochaca, Santa Ana Xochuca, Tecomatepec (San Pedro Tecomatepec), Tlacochaca, Yautepec, and Yerbas Buenas.

=== Demographic information ===
The population of the municipality according to the 2005 census is 30,073. 51% of the population lives in the town of Ixtapan de la Sal itself and 48.1% live in the surrounding municipality.

There are currently 114 schools with about 566 teachers. The illiteracy rate is 12.6%. 48.8% of the population is economically active.

=== Government ===
The government is formed by:

- Municipal president
- Attorney general
- 10 deputies

The municipality also has a secretary, director of municipal public works, municipal administrator, director of municipal development, municipal security chief, municipal slaughterhouse administrator, chief of human and material resources, director of sports, administrator of natural springs, director of water works and sanitation and director of civil protection.

These authorities have jurisdiction over both the town and municipality of Ixtapan de la Sal.

In each community belonging to the municipality, three representatives are chosen to help in the government and to represent their neighbors. In each community, there are also two or three of these representatives who help with security and with some government projects.

=== History ===
According to local historical accounts, indigenous migrants from the Pacific coast settled in the area of Ixtapan de la Sal around the late 14th century. The settlement's proximity to geothermal springs facilitated salt collection, which was a valuable commodity in the region.

At the time of the Spanish conquest, Hernán Cortés sent Andrés de Tapia to conquer Ixtapan de la Sal. The first priest who came to Ixtapan was Juan Guichen de Leyva. Evangelization was carried out by Franciscans who came here after 1543. Tradition states that 13 monks came to Ixtapan de la Sal to convert the Indians by associating Christ with the local deity associated with storms.

In 1822, Ixtapan de la Sal became a municipality of the state of Mexico. In 1825, the first elections to select the municipal council took place on Sunday, December 3 of the same year. On August 9 and 10, 1912, the population of Ixtapan de la Sal was attacked by "pseudo-Zapatistas", followers of Zapata's ideology. The invaders were led by Andres Ruiz and Francisco B. Pacheco. On August 1, 1918, by council agreement, a day of local mourning was declared – August 10 each year.

=== Geographical information ===
Ixtapan borders the municipalities of Coatepec Harinas to the northwest, Villa Guerrero to the northeast, and Zumpahuacán to the east, the municipality of Tonatico and the state of Guerrero to the south and the municipality of Zacualpan to the west.

Ixtapan de la Sal experiences a predominantly cool, semi-arid climate, with most rainfall occurring in the summer months. The average annual temperature is 17.9 °C (64 °F), with lows reaching approximately 1 °C (34 °F).

There is a great variety of plant species in Ixtapan de la Sal, among which are found watercress, borage, chamomile, pine, cedar, ash tree, jacaranda, avocado, date palms, reeds, rue, arnico, holm oak, oyamel fir, aile, casuarina, Mexican fig tree, cowslip, tree morning glory, liquorice, tepeguaj and pirul. A wide variety of animals also can be found, which includes rabbits, squirrels, sparrowhawks, quails, iguanas, badgers, coyotes, wild cats, skunks, ferrets, foxes, American badgers, gophers, opossums, mockingbirds and ringtails, but insects, birds and reptiles can also be spotted as well.

=== Popular celebrations ===
On the second Friday of Lent the annual religious celebration in honor to the Lord of Forgiveness is celebrated.

On August 15, a religious festival in honor of the Assumption of Mary takes place.

==== Traditions ====
As part of the ritual to mourn the dead, for nine days after the passing of a loved one, prayers are offered for the deceased. On the ninth day, a wooden cross that has been laid on the ground is raised upright and carried to the tomb to be placed there permanently.

Another tradition practiced in Ixtapan is the tianguis, which is an open-street market held every Sunday. Some people still practice el trueque (bartering) there.

==== Dances ====
The most popular is a dance parade called Apaches, participated in by local townspeople on September 15 and 16 in celebration of the Mexican War of Independence.

Students from the local schools and the school for the arts (Bellas Artes) often perform dance routines in the town square or other venues in celebration of Mother's Day, Teacher's Day and other festivities.

La danza de los Moros is performed by church members in the church's court during religious festivities.

La danza de los Chinelos is sometimes held as a dance parade or 'pilgrimage' to or from a shrine to honor the patron saint of the shrine.

==== Music ====
The traditional band is the Banda de Viento (the wind band). Its members play musical instruments without formal music education. There is also a weekly fountain light show complete with music at the Jardin Central at which the majority of Ixtapan's youth, couples, and families are present.

=== Arts and crafts ===
The principal handcrafts are pottery, carved wood and confectionery and also the production of pipían, pumpkin candy, in October and November. The most prominent are the wooden copalillo and pottery.
