= Coatlán del Río =

Town in Morelos, Mexico

- Municipality
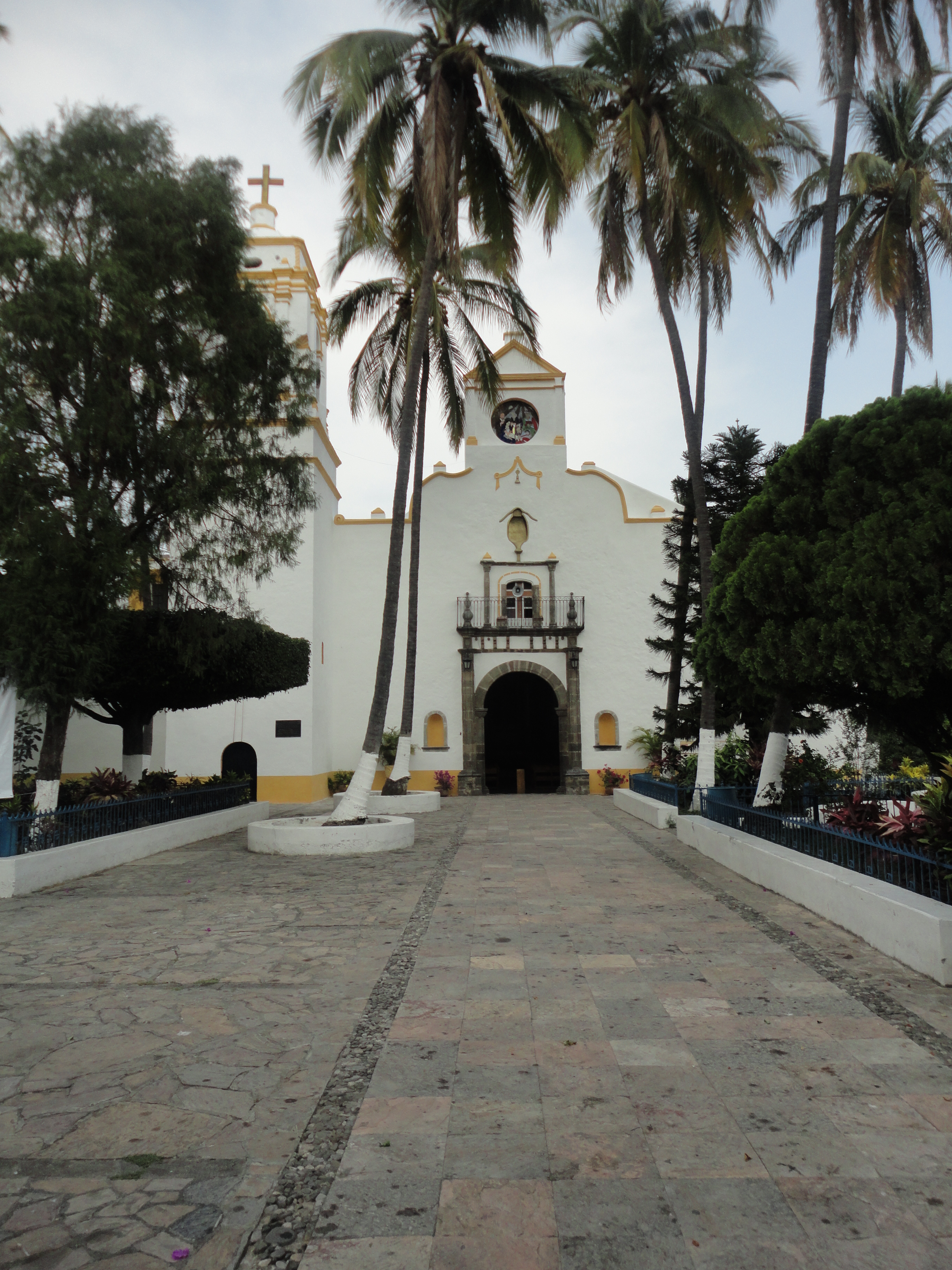

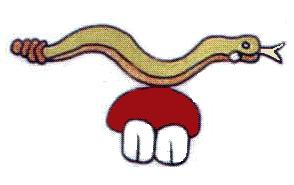
- Coat of arms

- Location in Mexico Coatlán del Río (Mexico)
- Country: Mexico
- State: Morelos
- Demonym: (in Spanish)
- Time zone: UTC−6 (CST)

Coatlán del Río is a town in the Mexican state of Morelos. It stands at 18°45′N 99°26′W, at a mean height of 1,010 metres above sea level.

Coatlán is a name of Nahuatl origin, meaning "place of abundant snakes".

The city serves as the municipal seat for the surrounding municipality of the same name. The municipality reported 9,768 inhabitants in the 2015 census and 10,520 in 2020. The town of Coatlán del Río had a population of 1,907 the same year.

== History ==
The origin of Coatlán del Río dates from the pre-Hispanic era. This town was founded by Toltecs in the year 1509, who were on a pilgrimage from Malinalco, State of Mexico. At first, they settled what is historically known as Coatlán Viejo (Old Coatlan), where there are stone ruins of the walls of buildings.

Coatlán Viejo is located 5 kilometers south of the municipal seat, on the hill known as Las Paredes (the Walls). Later, they moved to the hill of Axoyochi, located 3 km to the east, where archaeological remains of carved stones, known as Momoxtles (mound of earth), were found. It is believed there is a pyramid that has not been discovered.

Other ruins of a town have been found in San Rafael, on the banks of the Chalma River. The stone called Escudo (now in the Palace of Cortés, Cuernavaca a.k.a. Museo Regional Cuauhnahuac) is a series of hieroglyphic and pictographic figures represent the history of the area. There is a similar stone on the civic plaza of Coatlán del Río. Other groups, such as the Aztecs and the Tlahuica, may have settled in this area. This town belonged to the religious and political center of Xochicalco, to then become part of the lordship of Cuauhnahuac (Cuernavaca), a tributary city of the Aztecs.

In the Colonial Era (1521-1812), Coatlán del Río was given in encomienda (entrusted to) a conquistador named Juan Zermeño. In 1782, Zermeño's family filed a lawsuit against the Marquessate of the Valley of Oaxaca over control of the town church, San Gaspar, which had been built in the 16th century.

The current church of Coatlán del Río was founded in 1808, and the bells were added in 1809. There is also a church called Santos Reyes or Epifania del Señor, and the chapel of Dolores, also called el Calvario.

Coatlán del Río was declared a municipality on May 22, 1862.

The old municipal presidency was located to the south of the civic square, where the elementary school Prof. Miguel Salinas is today. In 1939, city hall has been at the former home of General Pedro Saavedra Brito (d. 1935). The current city hall was built in 1957 by Colonel Ezequiel Cruz Ortiz (1890-1970).

Carlos Nieto Estrada, an independent candidate, was elected Presidente Municipal (mayor) in the July 1, 2018 election.

The state of Morelos reported 209 cases and 28 deaths due to the COVID-19 pandemic in Mexico, as of April 27, 2020, two cases were reported in Coatlán del Río. Schools and many businesses were closed from mid March until June 1. On June 2, Coatlán del Río reported five confirmed cases and one death from the virus; the reopening of the state was pushed back until at least June 13. Coatlán del Río reported 17 cases, 12 recuperations, and six deaths as of August 31. Twenty-five cases were reported on December 27,2020.

== Water Resources ==
Federal government page in Spanish (Dec 19, 2018)

The municipality has important hydrological resources, which greatly benefit the regional economy and influence the climate, microclimates, and vegetation.

The most important river is the Chalma River, which source is in Chalma, State of Mexico. It crosses the municipality through Colonia Morelos, Cocoyotla; and Coatlán del Río. There are three dams: La Toma in Cocoyotla, and Apantle Chico and Cazahuatlánfrom in San Rafael. The Apantle Grande is derived from the Coatlán Dam; there is also another small dam in Cocoyotla, which is the source of the Agua Salada.

There are other low-flow streams such as the Cuates, the Cocoyotla, and the Axixintle that carry water throughout the year, and the Joyas, the Arenal and the Milpillas, which carry water only during the rainy season (May-November). There are also eight springs and seven wells.

== Tourist Attractions ==
- Parish of the Santos Reyes
- Chapel of Calvario
- Chapel of Cerrito (the Little Hill) in Coatlán del Río
- Chapel of San Andrés in Colonia Morelos
- Exhacienda and chapel of Santa Rosa in Cocoyotla
- Exhacienda Coatlán
- Ruins of Coatlán Viejo (Old Coatlan), the site of a Toltec settlement, founded in 1509 CE, located 5 km from the center of town
- Palacio Municipal
- Los Arcos Campo la Chia
- Piedra Coatlán, a stone with a series of figures that describe historical events according to the hieroglyphic and pictographic symbols that it presents. It is in the civic plaza of Coatlán del Río.

== Fiestas, dances, and Traditions ==
- January 1-6 — Epiphany season, fair and jaripeos (a type of rodeo), fireworks and a brass band; Coatlán del Río
- March 19-25 — Feast of Saint Joseph, jaripeos; Michapa
- April 25 — Feria del Mango; Coatlán del Río
- May 15-20 — Feast of Saint Isidore the Laborer, jaripeos; Chavarría
- June 24 — Feast of Saint John the Baptist jaripeos; Cocoyotla
- September 15-20 — Independence Day, fair and jaripeos; fireworks and a brass band; Coatlán del Río
- September 30–October 5 — Birthday of José María Morelos (b. 1765), parade; jaripeos; Cocoyotla
- November 11-15 — Feast of Saint Martin de Porres, jaripeo, Chinelo dancers, Mojiganga (a traditional theatrical production), and a parade; Col. Benito Juárez
- November 20-25 — Mexican Revolution, parade with a brass band and floats, jaripeos; Tilancingo
- December 8 — Feast of the Virgin of the Immaculate Conception, Mojiganga, brass band, Chinelos, jaripeo; Buenavista de Aldama and Colonia Benito Juárez
- December 12-18 — Feast of Our Lady of Guadalupe, parade, jaripeos; Apancingo
- December 24-31 — Christmas, jaripeos; Chavarría
- December 31 — New Year's Eve parade; Coatlán del Río

== Communities ==
There are several small towns and villages in the municipality. The principal economic activities are farming, ranching, dairy, and cultivation of fruit and flowers.

- Coatlán del Río is the municipal seat. It has 1,907 inhabitants and is located 65 km from Cuernavaca, at an altitude of 1,010 m / 3,314 ft.
- Cocoyotla has 1,333 residents and is located 3.5 km from Coatlán del Río at an altitude of 1,060 m / 3,478 ft.
- Tilancingo has 1,280 residents and is located 2 km from Coatlán del Río at an altitude of 1,020 m / 3346 ft.
- Michapa has 1,127 residents and is located 12 km from Coatlán del Río at an altitude of 1,190 m / 3,904 ft.
- Chavarría has 990 residents and is located 8.5 km from Coatlán del Río at an altitude of 1,124 m / 3688 ft.
- CEFERESO Número 16 CPS Femenil Morelos (Women′s penitentiary), population 833

Other communities have fewer than 1,000 residents.

== See also ==
- Encyclopedia of Municipalities: Coatlan (Spanish)
- List of people from Morelos
- Governors of Morelos
