= Diego Catalán =

Spanish philologist (1928–2008)

- Born: Diego Catalán Menéndez-Pidal; 16 September 1928; Madrid
- Died: 9 April 2008 (aged 79)
- Education: Complutense University of Madrid
- Occupations: Linguist, folklorist and professor

Diego Catalán Menéndez-Pidal (16 September 1928 – 9 April 2008) was a Spanish philologist, dialectologist, folklorist, and professor of Spanish Philology.

== Early life ==
Diego Catalán Menéndez-Pidal was born in Madrid on 16 September 1928 to parents, Miguel Catalán Sañudo and Jimena Menéndez-Pidal. His father, Miguel, was a spectroscopist and his mother, Jimena, was a teacher and co-founder of the Colegio Estudio, a children's school in Madrid where Catalán was a pupil for four years. His grandparents were philologists Ramón Menéndez Pidal and María Goyri de Menéndez Pidal.

Along with one other pupil, Catalán's class was the first to graduate from the Colegio Estudio after the Spanish Civil War following the completion of his bachillerato. Catalán then continued his education at the Complutense University of Madrid between 1944 and 1949, where he studied Romance languages.

== Archivo del Romancero ==
Catalán was primarily a medievalist, and he chaired the Ramón Menéndez Pidal Foundation which aims to continue the work of his grandfather, Ramón Menéndez Pidal (henceforth referred to as Pidal), especially in the field of Hispanic romanceros (the English equivalent of ballads in Spanish literature), editing and studying texts and the history of the Spanish language. He coordinated a large-scale project, el Romancero panhispánico (the Pan-Hispanic Ballad), which aimed to collect and preserve texts of this type and their variants. He proposed the distinction between two varieties of Spanish:

1. "Atlantic", which broadly speaking includes the southern part of Spain and the Americas.
2. "Continental", which includes the remainder of mainland Spain.

Catalán was the owner of the Archivo del Romancero (Ballad Archive), which covers materials and work of philological and historical research. The archive includes works from the late nineteenth century to the present day, and is held by the Ramón Menéndez Pidal Foundation, a research and training centre for researchers, scholars and hispanists. The archive was considered a national treasure and thus was protected at the League of Nations' headquarters in Geneva during the Spanish Civil War. Pidal passed the archive to Catalán testamentarily, examples of which have been included in the subsections below.

=== 1. Archivo del Romancero Hispánico Menéndez Pidal/Goyri (AMP) ===
This is a collection of thousands of written documents that include the Romancero Antiguo (Old Ballad), which contained texts from the medieval period and the Spanish Golden Age, as well as the Romancero de Tradición Oral Moderna, which contain modern/ contemporary texts from the eighteenth century to the present day.

=== 2. Archivo Sonoro del Romancero Débora Catalán (ASOR) ===
This archive contains all magnetic tapes recorded in surveys and field investigations. The most significant projects in the collection are Edición y análisis de estructuras abiertas: el modelo Romancero (translated as "Editing and analysis of open structures: the Romancero model"), and Description, Editing and Analysis of the Pan-Hispanic Romancero by Diego Catalán. These were sponsored by the Treaty of Friendship and Cooperation between Spain and the United States and the National Endowment for the Humanities, as well as receiving donations from various collectors, notably the Purcell collections (from Azores and Madeira), Felipe (Canary Islands) and Pedrosa (mainland Spain).

=== 3. Archivo de la Lengua Española y Lenguas Circunvecinas ===
This contains all files and scientific material used by Pidal to prepare, among others, his magnum opus, Historia de la Lengua Española, which was published posthumously in 2005 and again as a second edition in 2007. In addition to medieval documents and drafts of Pidal's work, the archive contains thousands of files that relate to etymology, linguistic geography, dialectology, paleography, and historical literature and legal documentation.

=== 4. Archivo de Historiografía Peninsular y Épica ===
This is a collection of texts in photography, microfilm and handwritten copies of medieval works whose various manuscripts can be found in multiple libraries around the world, along with annotations and handwritten studies by Pidal, Catalán, and Antonio Solalinde. These have served as the basis for publications by Pidal, Catalán, and other researchers on medieval historiography in Castilian Spanish, Portuguese, Aragonese, Navarrese, Catalan, and Hispano-Arabic, Hispanic medieval history, and Spanish epic poetry. They also provided the framework for ten volumes of the series Fuentes cronísticas de la historia de España (Chronological Sources of the History of Spain).

=== 5. Archivo cultural de fines del siglo XIX y primera mitad del siglo XX ===
This includes scientific and institutional correspondence between Pidal and both researchers and key figures in both Spanish and international culture from the late nineteenth century until the first half of the twentieth, such as Gaston Paris, Américo Castro, and Antonio Solalinde, among others.

=== 6. Archivo de los Laboratorios Humanísticos ===
This archive contains documentation and correspondence gathered by Catalán and archived within the Foundation, pertaining to the periods during which he initially served as Director of Research, and subsequently as Director of the Seminario Menéndez Pidal (“Menéndez Pidal Seminar”). This collection shows the administrative, institutional, and academic developments that led to the establishment and continuation of the research and educational institution, Casa Menéndez Pidal ("Menéndez Pidal House").

=== 7. Archivo de Materiales y Obras para el conocimiento de la Historia de la Cultura Hispánica ===
This is a documentary collection of investigations that accompanied Pidal's work, such as files from both him and wife on literature, linguistics, history, and literary and historical figures.

=== 8. Archivo Miguel A. Catalán ===
Named after Catalán's father, Miguel Catalán, who was considered an important scientific figure in Spain during the first half of the twentieth century, this archive contains books, leaflets, drafts, letters, photographs and other scientific material related to the fields of physics, chemistry and spectrochemistry from Spain's scientific awakening during the early twentieth century.

== Works ==
All works have been included with their original Spanish titles unless a version in English exists.

=== 1950s ===
- 1953: Poema de Alfonso XI: fuentes, dialecto, estilo
- 1955: La escuela lingüística española y su concepción del lenguaje

=== 1960s ===
- 1962: De Alfonso X al Conde de Barcelos: cuatro estudios sobre el nacimiento de la historiografía romance en Castilla y Portugal
- 1969: Siete siglos de romancero (historia y poesía)

=== 1970s ===
- 1970: Por campos del romancero: estudios sobre la tradición oral moderna
- 1974: La Tradición oral manuscrita en la "Crónica de Alfonso XI"
- 1974: Lingüística íbero-románica: crítica retrospectiva

=== 1980s ===
- 1983/1984: El Romancero pan-hispánico: Catálogo general descriptivo (The Pan-Hispanic ballad: general descriptive catalogue). This was written by Catalán in collaboration with the Seminario Menéndez Pidal.
- 1989: El Español: orígenes de su diversidad
- 1989: Las lenguas circunvecinas del castellano: cuestiones de dialectología hispano-románica. This was written by Catalán in collaboration with Álvaro Galmés de Fuentes, a fellow Spanish philologist, dialectologist and arabist.

=== 1990s ===
- 1991: Romancero general de León: antología 1899-1989. This was written by Catalán in collaboration with Mariano de la Campa and Débora Catalán and published in two volumes of the Editorial de la Universidad Complutense.
- 1992: La Estoria de España de Alfonso X: creación y evolución
- 1997: De la silva textual al taller historiográfico alfonsí : códices, crónicas, versiones y cuadernos de trabajo
- 1997/1998: Arte poética del Romancero oral: los textos abiertos de creación colectiva

=== 2000s ===
- 2001: El archivo del romancero: historia documentada de un siglo de historia(dos tomos).
- 2001: La épica española: nueva documentación y nueva evaluación
- 2002: El Cid en la historia y sus inventores
- 2005: Rodericus” romanzado, en los reinos de Aragón. Castilla y Navarra. This was written by Catlán in collaboration with Enrique Jerez.
- 2005/2006: Historia de la lengua by Ramón Menéndez Pidal (volume I), where Catalán provided notes and edits, and Una catedral para una lengua: Introducción a la historia de la lengua española de Menéndez Pidal (volume II).

== Death ==
Catalán died of heart disease on 9 April 2008 at the age of 79.
