= RT Persei =

Star system in the constellation Perseus

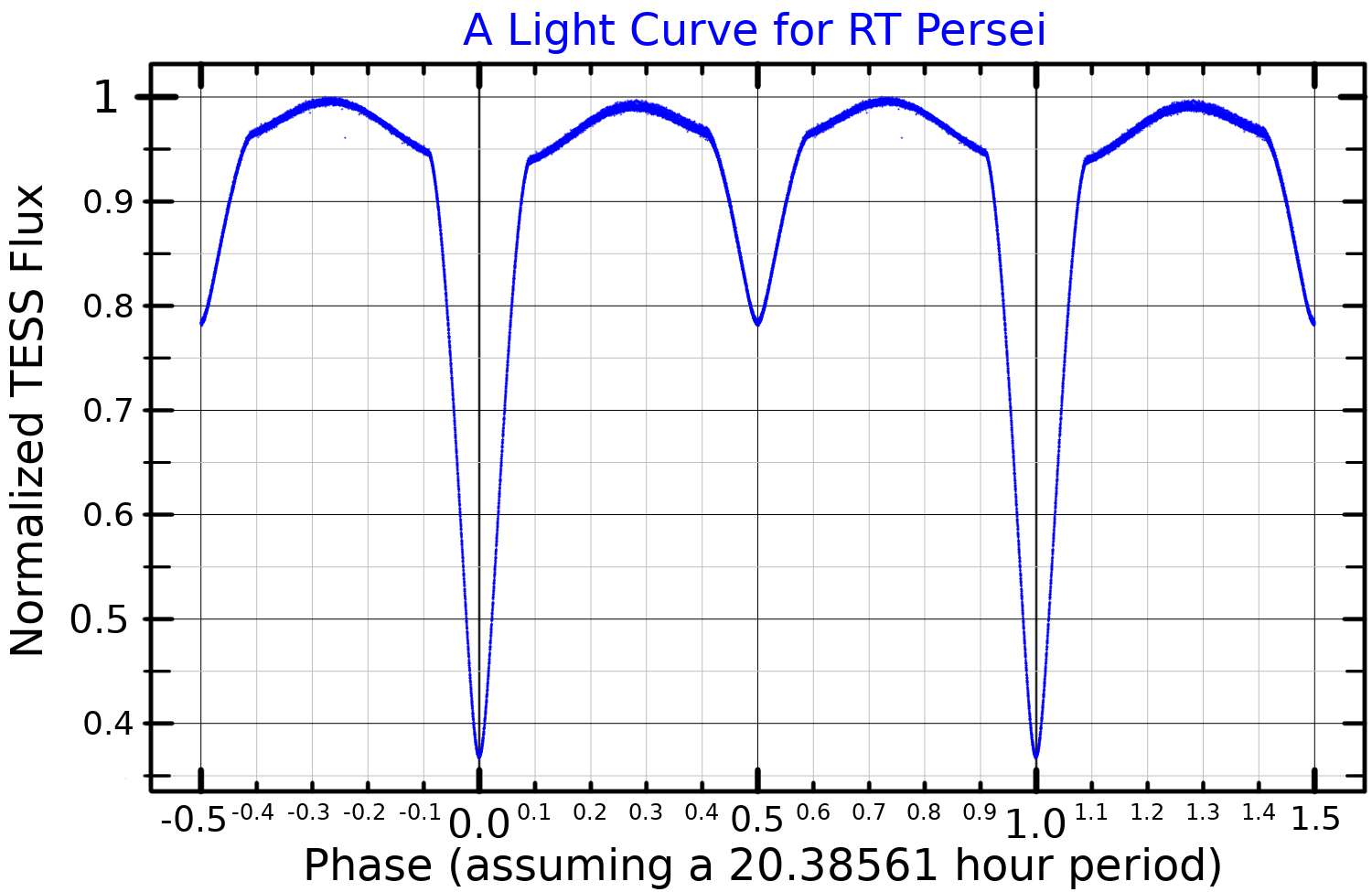
- A light curve for RT Persei, plotted from TESS data

Observation data Epoch J2000 Equinox ICRS
- Constellation: Perseus
- Right ascension: 03^{h} 23^{m} 40.399^{s}
- Declination: +46° 34′ 35.84″
- Apparent magnitude (V): 10.46; Min_{1}: 11.74; Min_{2}: 10.67

Characteristics
- Spectral type: F5V + G7IV
- Variable type: Semidetached Algol

Astrometry
Radial velocity (R_{v})	−12±2 km/s
Proper motion (μ)	RA: 13.084 mas/yr Dec.: 23.763 mas/yr
Parallax (π)	5.1901±0.0189 mas
Distance	628 ± 2 ly (192.7 ± 0.7 pc)

Orbit
Period (P)	0.8494 d
Semi-major axis (a)	4.190" (4.2 AU)
Eccentricity (e)	0.00
Inclination (i)	~86°
Periastron epoch (T)	2,417,861.407 HJD
Argument of periastron (ω) (secondary)	0.00°
Semi-amplitude (K_{1}) (primary)	55.0 km/s
Semi-amplitude (K_{2}) (secondary)	194.7 km/s

Details

Primary
Mass	1.08 M_{☉}
Radius	1.20 R_{☉}
Luminosity	2.24 L_{☉}
Surface gravity (log g)	4.32 cgs
Temperature	6,460 K
Metallicity [Fe/H]	−0.28 dex

Secondary
Mass	0.30 M_{☉}
Radius	1.08 R_{☉}
Luminosity	0.49 L_{☉}
Temperature	4,650 K

Other designations
- RT Per, BD+46°740, HIP 15811

Database references
SIMBAD	data

RT Persei is a variable star system in the northern constellation of Perseus, abbreviated RT Per. It is an eclipsing binary system with an orbital period of 0.84940032 d (20.386 h). At peak brightness the system has an apparent visual magnitude of 10.46, which is too faint to be viewed with the naked eye. During the eclipse of the primary this decreases to magnitude 11.74, then to magnitude 10.67 with the secondary eclipse. The distance to this system is approximately 628 light years based on parallax measurements. It is drifting closer with a heliocentric radial velocity of about −12 km/s.

In 1905 this system was found to be an Algol variable by Lidiya Tseraskaya. K. Graff determined a period of 0.84943 days. In 1911, R. S. Dugan published evidence for a secondary eclipse and noted the influence of ellipticity of the components on its light curve, as well as influences from their mutual reflection and heating. By 1938, the period of the system had been found to vary, suggesting the perturbing influence of a third body. D. J. K. O'Connell in 1951 found the light curve of RT Per to be asymmetrical, a phenomenon later termed the O'Connell effect.

This is a semidetached binary system with a circular orbit where the secondary component is filling its Roche lobe and losing mass. The primary component is an F-type main-sequence star with a stellar classification of F5V. It has 1.08 times the mass of the Sun, 1.20 times the Sun's radius, and is close to filling its Roche lobe. The secondary is a more evolved subgiant star with a class of G7IV. It has just 30% of the Sun's mass but has expanded to 108% of the solar radius.

The system has undergone irregular jumps in orbital period, which are common among Algol-type variables that are exchanging mass and angular momentum. Measured decreases in the period may be variously explained by spin-orbit coupling and interaction of the stellar magnetic fields. Based upon long-term trends in the light curve, an unseen third component is moving in an elliptical orbit with the inner pair over a period of 41.9 years. It is estimated to be orbiting at a distance of at least 2.67 AU with an eccentricity (ovalness) of 0.34.
