= Urueña =

Coordinates: 41°44′N 5°12′W

Urueña, Spain
- Municipality
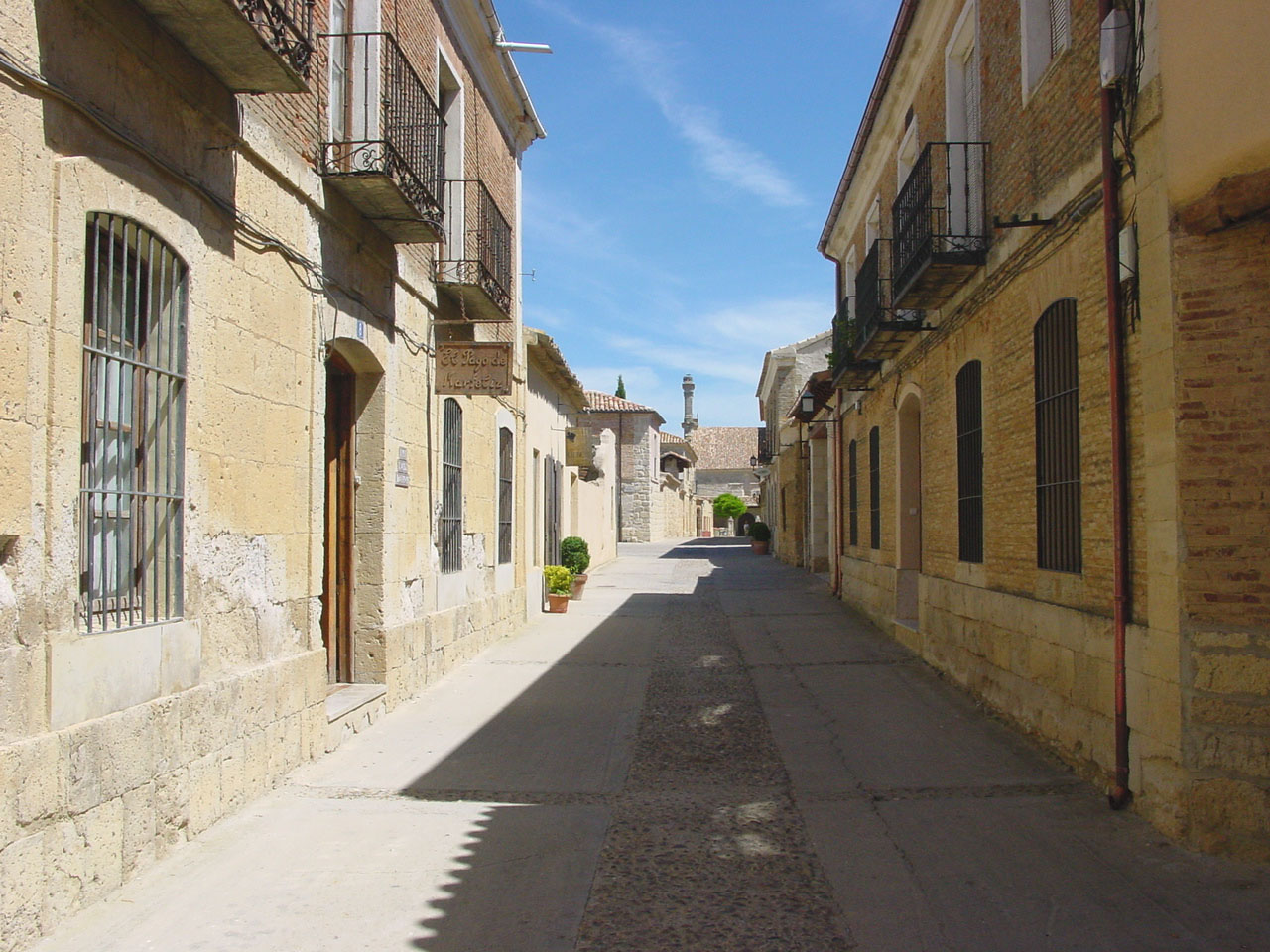
- Royal Street of Urueña

- Coat of arms
- Interactive map of Urueña, Spain
- Country: Spain
- Autonomous community: Castile and León
- Province: Valladolid
- Municipality: Urueña

Area
  - Total: 44 km^{2} (17 sq mi)

Population (2025-01-01)
  - Total: 200
  - Density: 4.5/km^{2} (12/sq mi)
- Time zone: UTC+1 (CET)
  - Summer (DST): UTC+2 (CEST)

Urueña is a municipality located in the province of Valladolid, Castile and León, Spain. According to the 2004 census (INE), the municipality has a population of 213 inhabitants.

The streets and stone houses have been restored to reflect those of a medieval town. The city still retains much of its walls, including two gates and the castle. The parish church, Santa María del Azogue, was built in gothic-renaissance styles.

It also features four museums. Outside the walled enclosure and within walking distance is the Romanesque-style Ermita de Nuestra Señora de la Anunciada (Hermitage of Our Lady of the Annunciation) and the ruins of an old monastery. Evidence of prehistoric inhabitants has been found in the region.

It is a member of the I.O.B.-International Organisation of Book Towns, a network of villages where second-hand and antiquarian bookshops are concentrated.

== Toponymy ==
The term "Urueña" could derive from the Basque word ur, meaning 'water,' combined with the pre-Roman locative suffix -anca, which first transformed into -anga and later into -ueña during its Castilianization. However, this would represent an unprecedented phonetic evolution and is philologically inexplicable. According to linguist Álvaro Galmés de Fuentes, the suffix originates from the Celtic onna, meaning 'spring or stream,' which would have evolved regularly into "-ueña."

== Geography ==
The municipality is located in the province of Valladolid, excluded from the region known as Tierra de Campos. It sits atop a hill, within the foothills of the Torozos Mountains.

== History ==
The history of this town takes us back to the earliest Vaccean settlements. It was Romanized at the beginning of the Common Era and Christianized around the 10th century. From the 12th to the 14th centuries, it served as the head of the Infantado of Valladolid.

The town’s location, strategically dominating the valley, made it highly attractive to early settlers. Its name is believed to derive from the Vaccean language: Ur-Uru (water area) and Anna-Eneas (sister). At the foot of the hill where the town stands, a spring of clean water has existed since antiquity, supplying the population for centuries. In the mid-20th century, a fountain was built within the town, drawing water from this spring to ease residents’ access.

The Romans arrived in the area around 1 BC. A connecting route between Palencia and Zamora, the Toresana road, passed through the territory, with remnants of the road and a bridge still visible.

During the Middle Ages, under King Sancho II of Castile (Sancho the Strong), the town became the head of the Infantado of Valladolid. His sister, Lady Urraca, cared for and inhabited the fiefdom. Later, Alfonso VII granted his sister Sancha Raimúndez the Infantado of Valladolid, including dominion over the towns of Medina de Rioseco, Castromonte, and Urueña—all situated on the border between the kingdoms of León and Castile, which were united under Alfonso VII’s reign. When Alfonso VII died in 1157, the kingdoms were divided again: León went to his son Fernando II, and Castile to Sancho III the Desired, who fortified Urueña in response to the new division. Sancho III ruled for only a year, succeeded by the child Alfonso VIII of Castile. The Infantado of Valladolid then fell under the jurisdiction of Fernando II of León, who, feeling wronged by Alfonso VII’s will, exploited Alfonso VIII’s minority to seize these lands. When Alfonso VIII came of age, he waged war against Fernando II, forcing the signing of a peace treaty in Medina de Rioseco, which restored the borders as outlined in Alfonso VII’s will. Subsequent disputes led to another treaty, the Treaty of Fresno-Lavandera, listing territories belonging to each kingdom; Urueña remained part of Castile. In later reigns, the town persisted as a crucial border point between the two kingdoms.

In the 15th century, King Juan II gifted the town to Don Pedro Girón, steward and favorite of Prince Enrique IV (the future king).

In 1876, a devastating fire destroyed half the town, including the Town Council and all its archives. Recently, in the late 20th and early 21st centuries, Urueña has undergone significant transformation in appearance, infrastructure, and quality of life. Streets have been paved, houses and palaces reconstructed, and the castle—now used as a cemetery—was restored and landscaped in 2005. The town also boasts a vibrant cultural life, thanks to museums such as the most notable Ethnographic Museum, managed by its founder Joaquín Díaz and housed in a reconstructed 16th-century building.

== Gallery ==
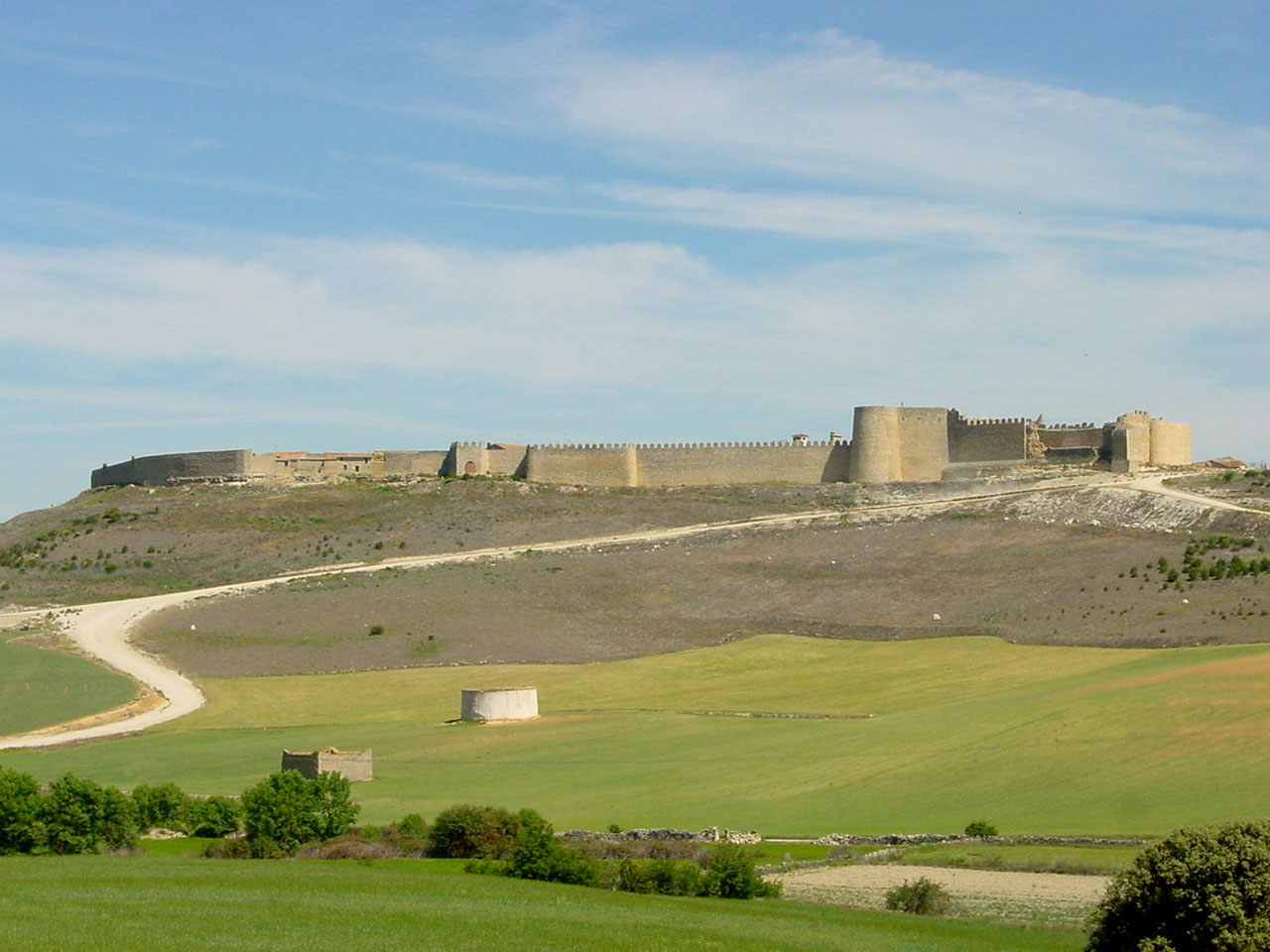
view of urueña walls

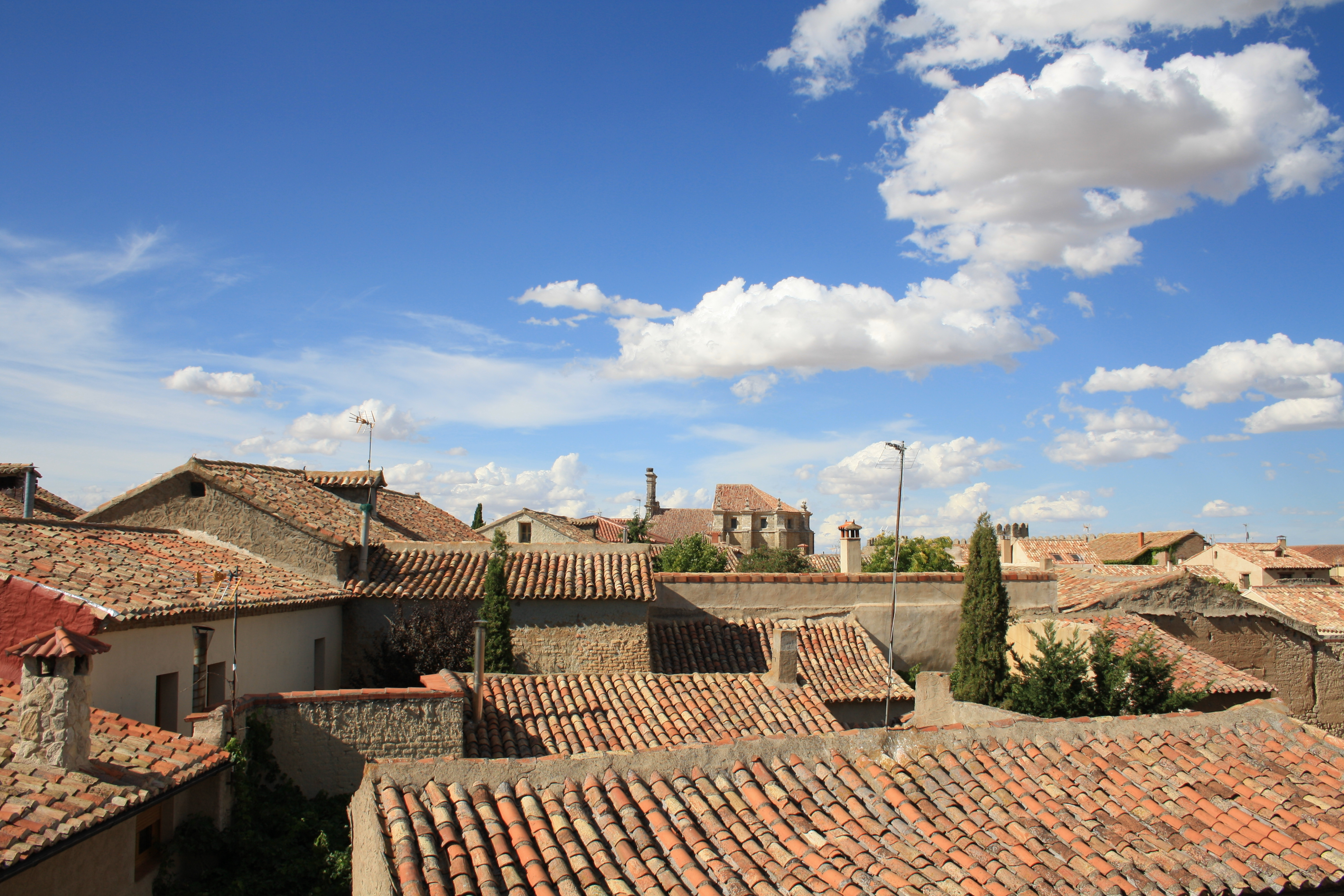
view of urueña

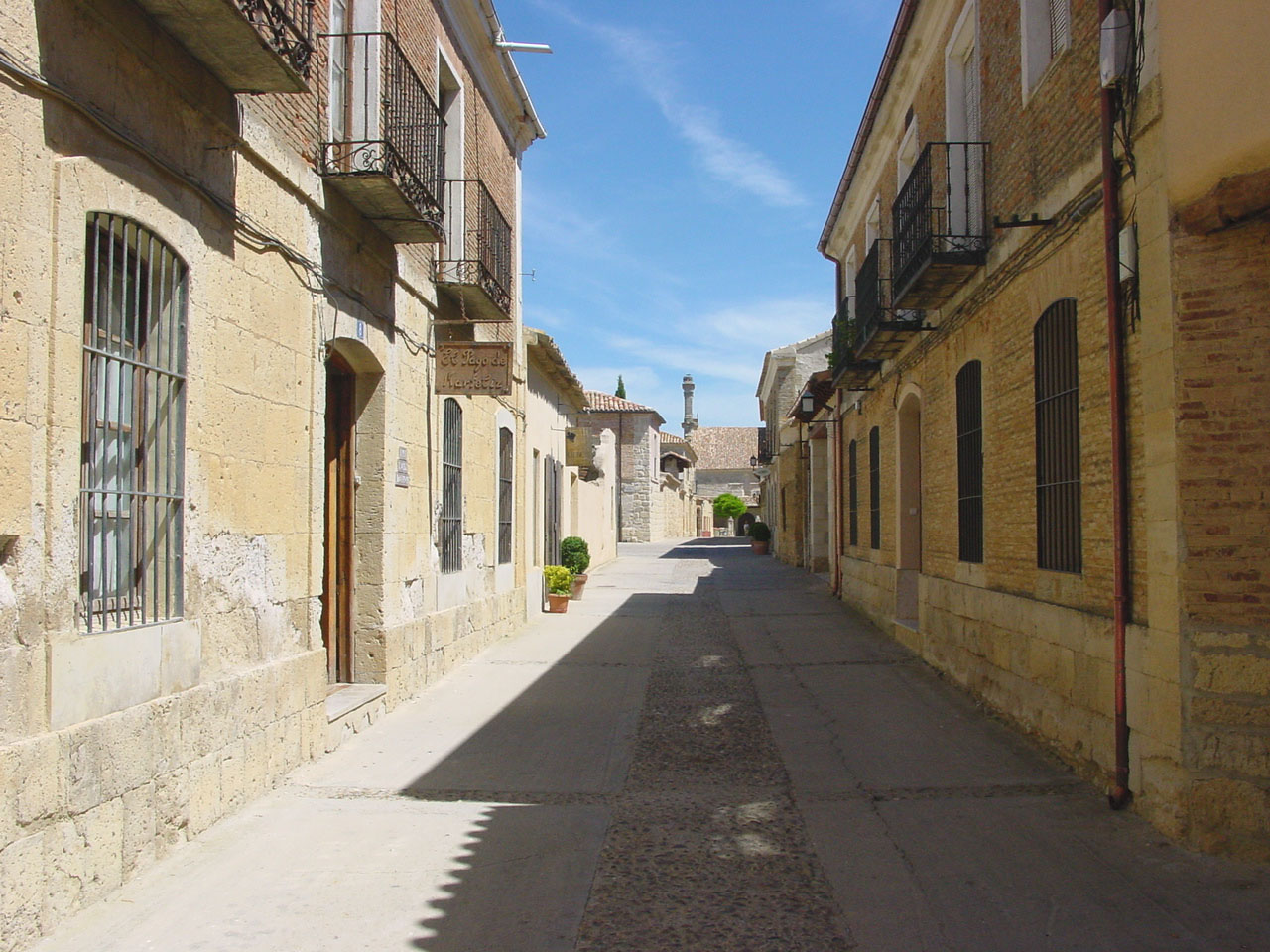
street

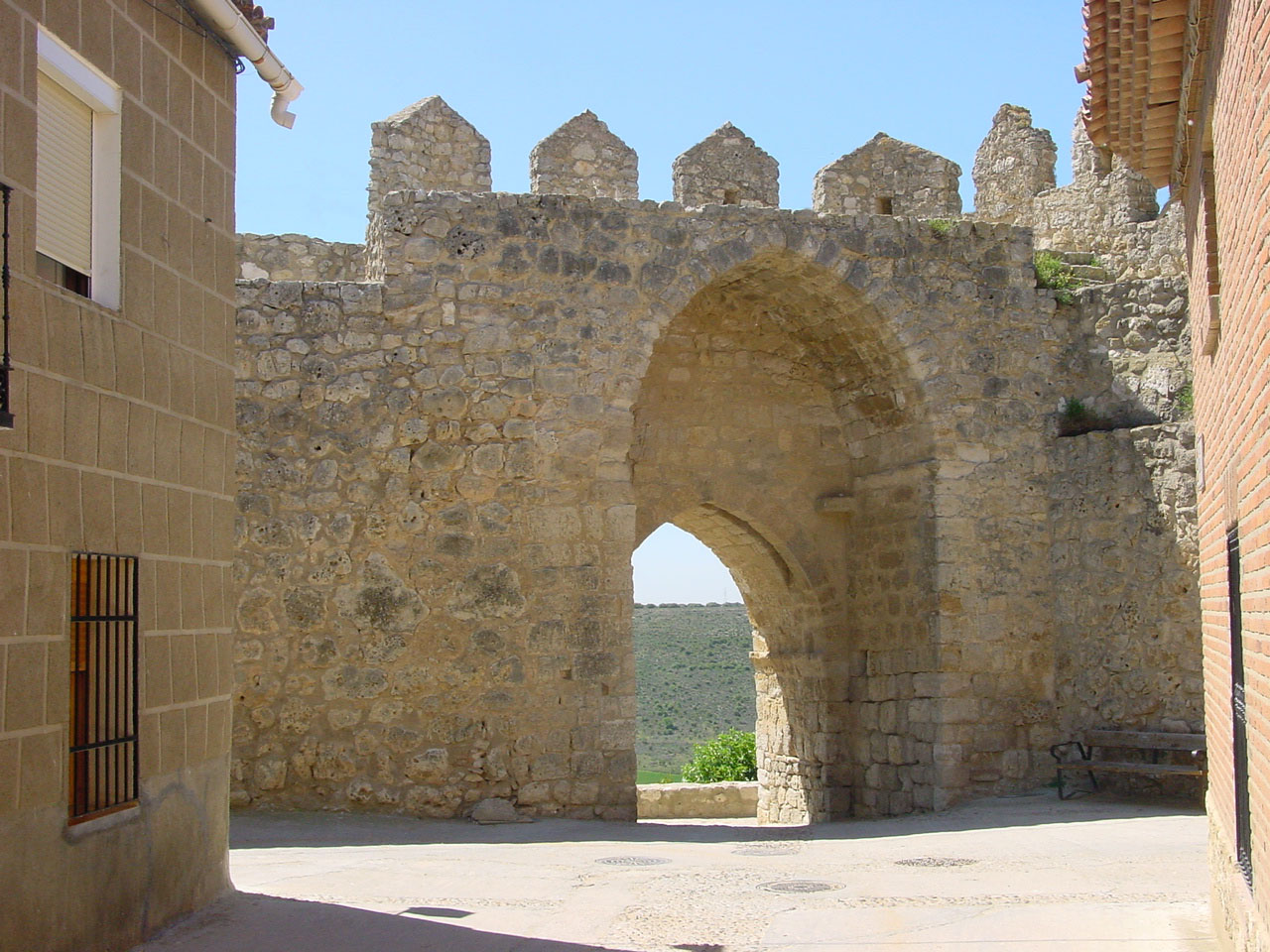
urueña walls

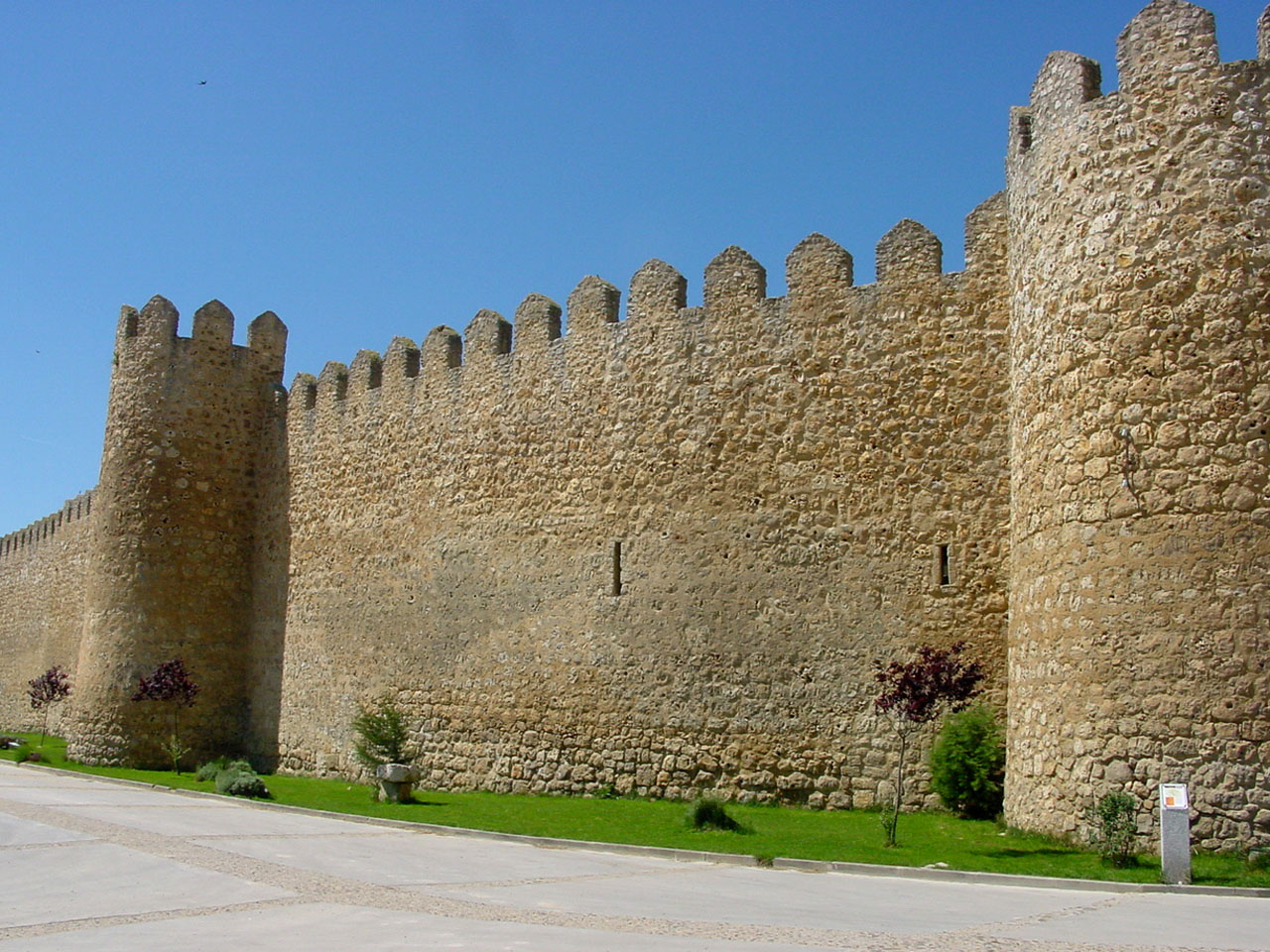
urueña walls

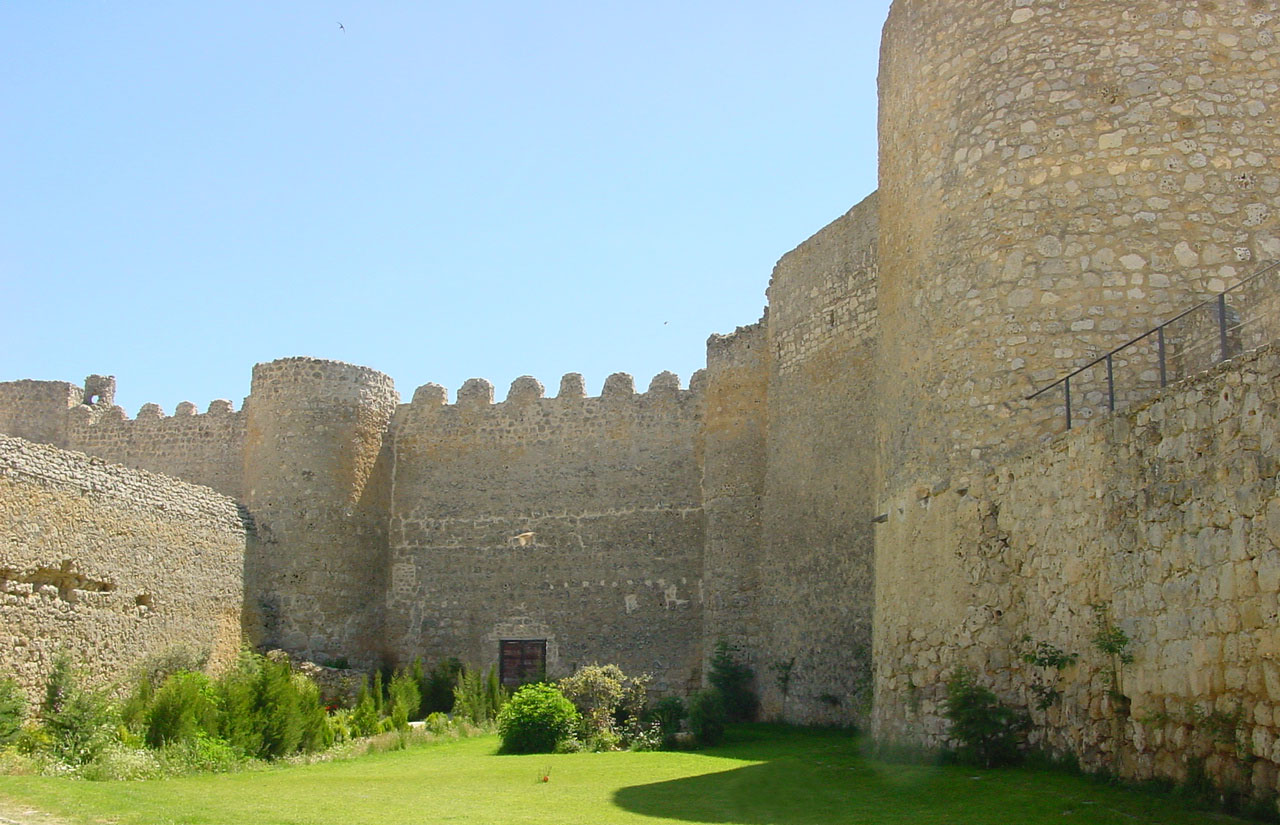
Castle of urueña

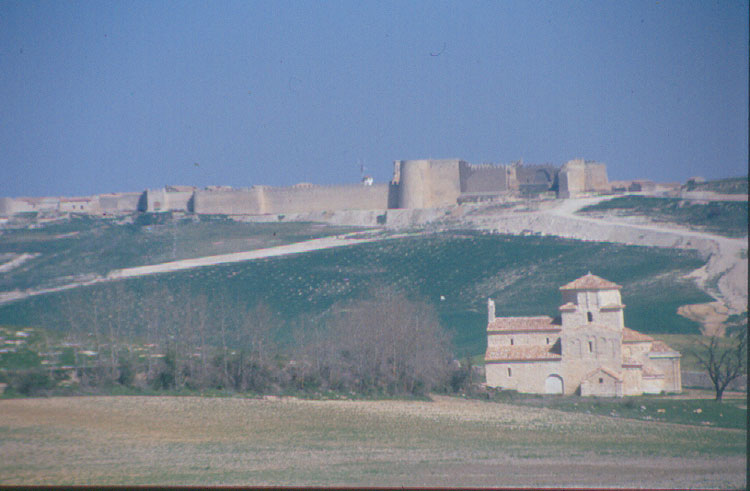
Hermitage and walls

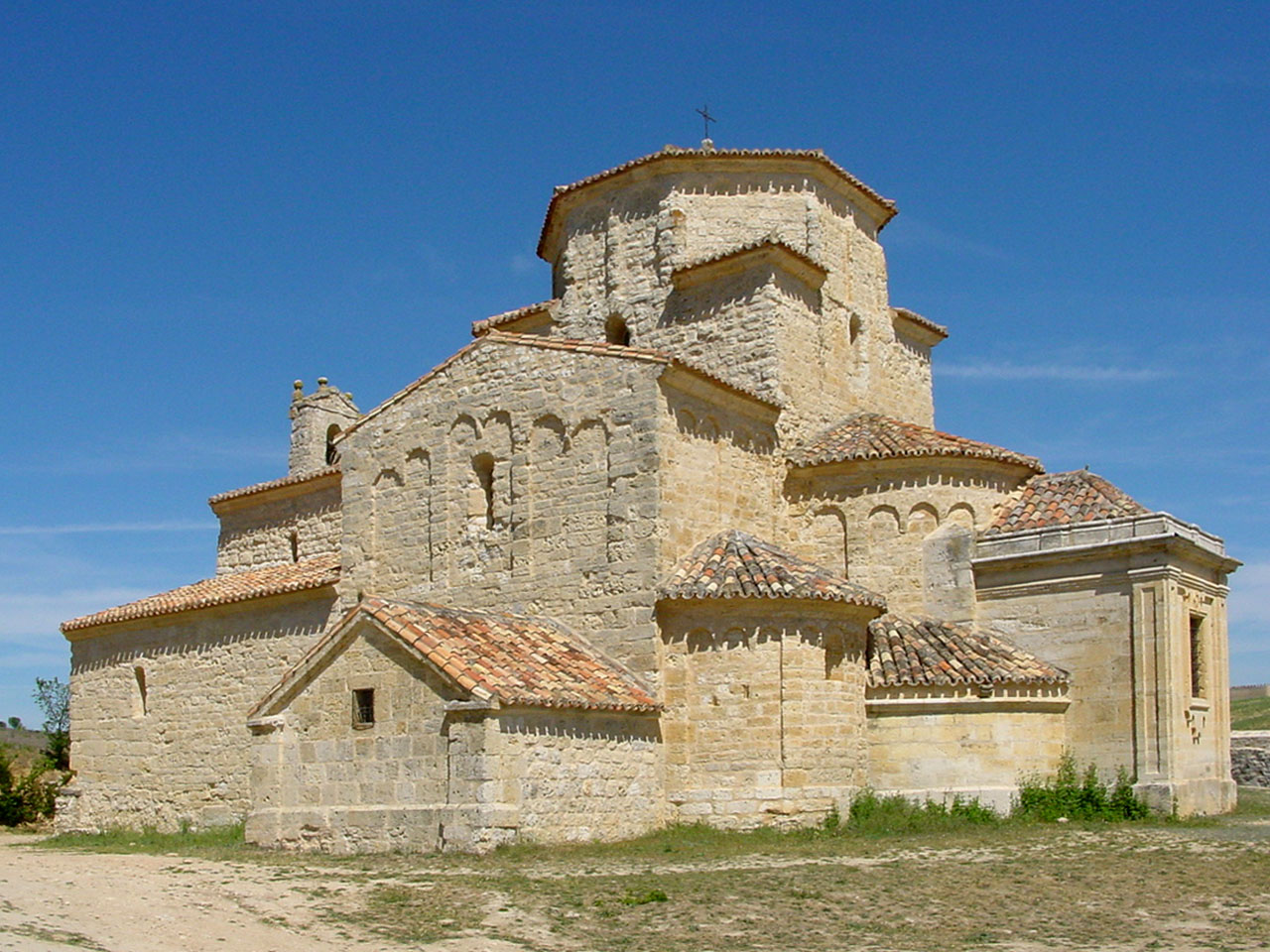
Hermitage

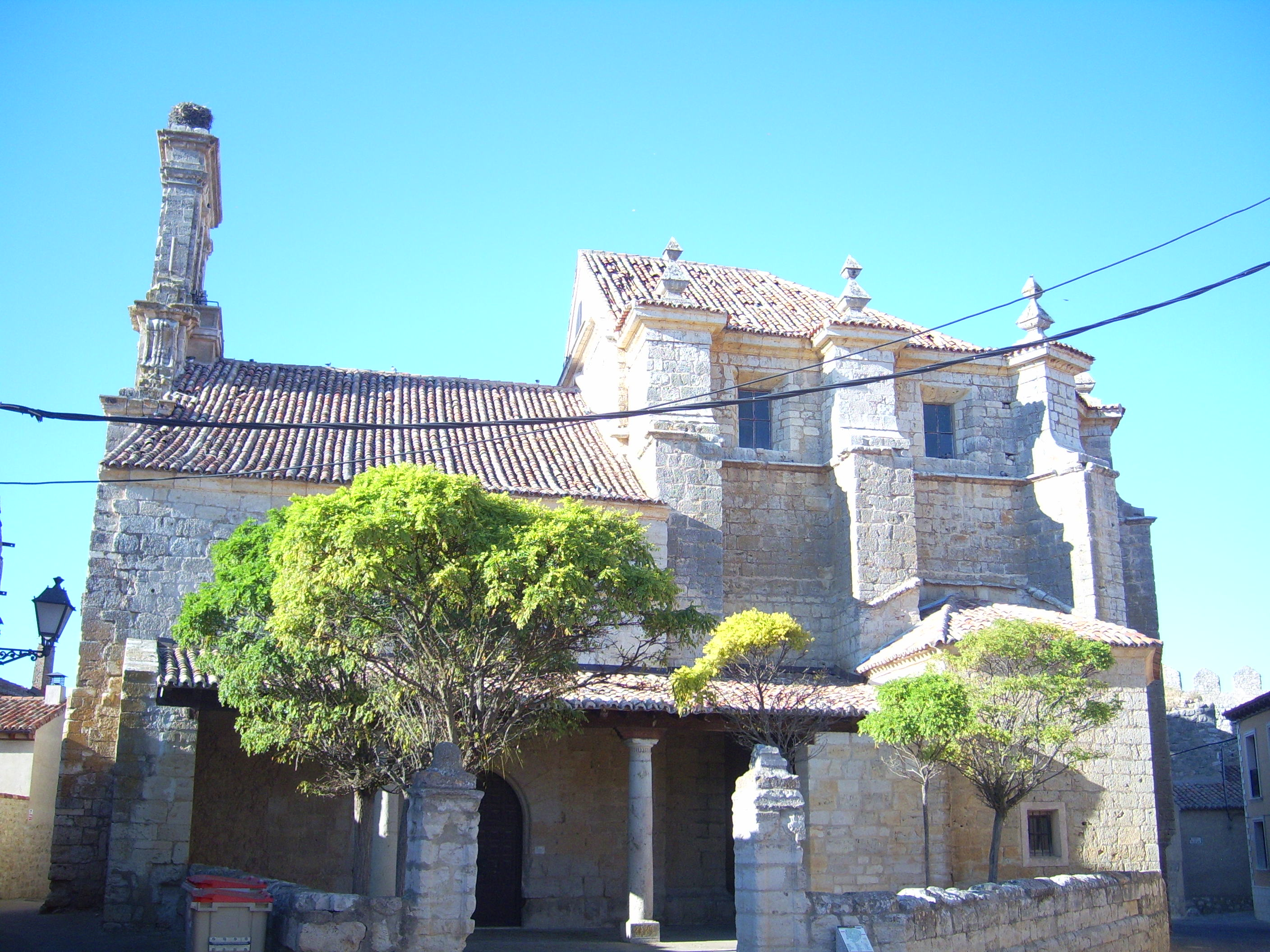
Church of Saint Mary of Azogue

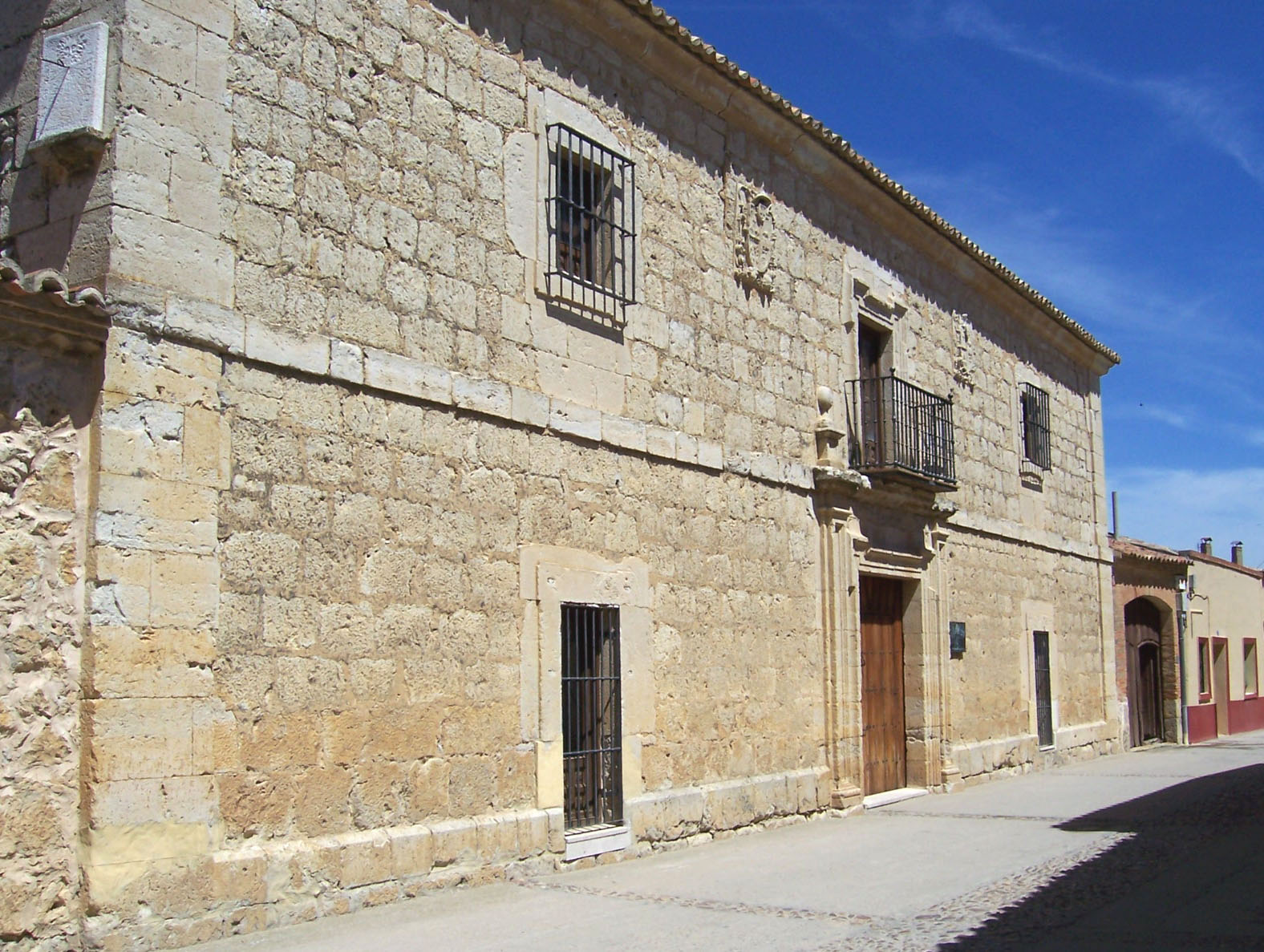
Joaquin Díaz Ethnographic Museum

== See also ==
- Cuisine of the province of Valladolid
