= María Goyri =

María Amalia Vicenta Goyri also known as María Goyri de Menéndez Pidal (29 August 1873 in Madrid –28 November 1954 in Madrid) was a Spanish Hispanist, literary critic, researcher, educator and advocate for women's rights. In 1896 she became the first Spanish woman to earn a degree in Philosophy and Letters and the first to earn her doctorate, in 1909, at a Spanish university (the Complutense University of Madrid). She was the wife of Ramón Menéndez Pidal.

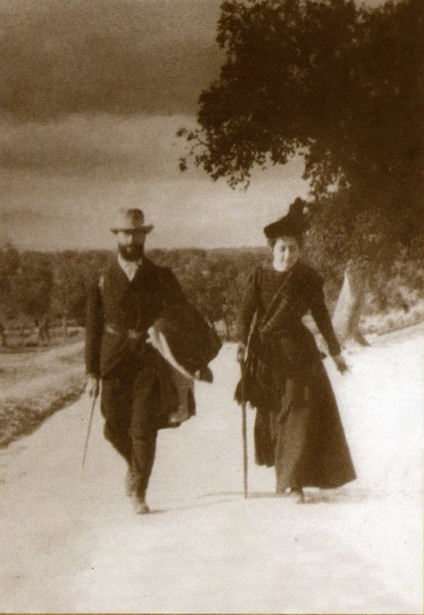
Ramón Menéndez Pidal and María Goyri in 1900. Newlyweds on the route of El Cid. Archivo Digital Menéndez Pidal.

== Biography ==
María Amalia Vicenta Goyri was born on 29 August 1873 in Madrid to a Basque family, she spent her early years in Algorta, a seaside village in the province of Biscay. She returned to Madrid with her single mother, Amalia Goyri, a seamstress of great character and culture. Due to her delicate health she was educated at home by her mother, who frequently gave her lessons outdoors in the Buen Retiro Park to help combat her tubercular arthritis. Ignoring the conventions of the time she enrolled María in a gym and when she was twelve she began business courses at the Association for the Education of Women. There she discovered she enjoyed the study of grammar and in 1887 she enrolled in the School for Governesses to become a teacher. In 1890 she and another young student, Carmen Gallardo, audited classes in the School of Philosophy and Letters at the University of Madrid. In 1892 she received permission from the General Secretary of Public Instruction to register officially as a female student in order to attend classes on the condition that her presence not distract male students. Prior to each class she was not permitted to wait in the corridor and had to wait in an office adjacent to her classroom. Her professor would then escort her to her own individual desk near his. At the end of class she would be escorted out the same way. One of her professors was the foremost academic of the day, the Spanish scholar and historian, Marcelino Menéndez Pelayo. In her first year she heard Emilia Pardo Bazán's presentation of "The Education of Men & Women" in which she attacked Rousseau and François Fénelon as anti-feminist and defended John Stuart Mill and Gottfried Leibniz for their progressive advocacy of educational reforms for women. When Concepción Arenal's presentation of her views on women's duties and rights provoked violent attacks, María stood up and vehemently defended the elderly activist. María Goyri obtained the titles of normal school professor (1893), licentiate in philosophy and letters (1896), and Doctor of Philosophy and letters (1909).

== Marriage ==
María met Ramón Menéndez Pidal when Menéndez Pelayo took her to hear his former student give a lecture at the Graduate School of the University. Ramón was now a university professor and had obtained the chair in Romance Philology. Finding they shared the same interests she became his student and then his assistant. They were married in 1900 and for their honeymoon they retraced the geographic locales of the Poem of the Cid (Poema de mío Cid), the oldest preserved Spanish epic poem.

They had three children: Ramón, who died in childhood, Jimena and Gonzalo.

María and Ramón devoted their lives to research on everything related to philology and the preservation of ancient Spanish history and ballads. She also collaborated with the Protectorado del Niño Delincuente (Child Delinquent Protectorate), an organization founded in 1916 to help prevent the incarceration of youths under the age of 16. When the Instituto Escuela de segunda enseñanza (High School Institute) was established in 1918 she taught language and literature. On October 23, 1933 she was elected board member of the Patronato del Centro para Ampliación de Estudios (Board for Advanced Studies) and worked along with Blas Cabrera, Luis Calandre, María de Maeztu and Luis de Zulueta. She taught at the Institute of Free Education (Junta para Ampliación de Estudios) until the outbreak of the Spanish Civil War combining physical exercise along with intellectual studies.

== Spanish Civil War ==
The war was a catastrophe for Goyri. María and Ramón were at their country house at San Rafael, a town nestled on the royal road linking Madrid to the Royal Palace of La Granja de San Ildefonso, when the Civil war broke out taking them completely by surprise. They were with their daughter Jimena, her husband, Miguel Catalán Sañudo and their son Diego Catalán in an area controlled by military who had risen against the Second Spanish Republic. After bombardment by planes from the Cuatro Vientos Airport they were forced to flee to El Espinar and later to Segovia for safety.

The couple was sympathetic to the Nationalist cause, but managed to alienate both supporters of Francisco Franco and the Republican faction. Goyri still defended her liberal views including equal rights for women in all areas, especially education. In the Archivo General de la Guerra Civil Española (General Archive of the Spanish Civil War) is a report that was made up by the National Defense Council led by Franco. It reveals that the family members of Menéndez Pidal-Catalán and their circle of friends were being discreetly watched and their correspondence checked. The report sent to Burgos, the base of the Nationalist government, said that "Ramón Menéndez Pidal, Director of the Royal Spanish Academy, was weak of character and totally dominated by his wife, María Goyri, a cultured woman of great talent and extraordinary energy who has perverted her husband and children. She is very persuasive and one of the most dangerous people in Spain. Without doubt one of the more robust roots of the revolution." The couple went abroad until the end of the war when, having come under pressure, Ramón resigned from the directorship of the Royal Spanish Academy in 1939.

== Later years ==
Ramón was rehabilitated and reelected director of the Royal Spanish Academy in 1947. However, after the war the Free Institute of Education and all schools under the auspices of the Board for Advanced Studies were banned and teachers forbidden to promote women's equality in education and other liberal causes. In addition to teaching María devoted her later years to research, gathering and archiving different versions of ancient oral ballads that are now kept in the Fundación Ramón Menéndez Pidal, a non-profit center dedicated to developing historical and philogical studies and humanistic research. Located at the olive grove garden of Olivar de Chamartin in the north of Madrid it is an indispensable source for scholars and is today considered part of the "National Treasure" of Spain.

She died 28 November 1954 in her native Madrid.

Her niece was the writer and activist María Teresa León (daughter of her sister Oliva) and her grandson was the Spanish philologist Diego Catalán who presided over the "Fundación Ramón Menéndez Pidal". There are streets in Alicante, Cordoba, Granada and Guadalajara named after her (Calle María Goyri).

== Publications ==
- "Romance de la muerte del Principe D. Juan," in the Bulletin Hispanique, volume iv, (1902)
- "Romances que deben buscarse en la tradición oral," in Revista de Archivos, Bibliotecas, y Museos, (1907)
- various articles on "El Conde Lucano," in Revue Hispanique (1899)
- Romania (1900)
- Revista de Archivos, etc, (1902)
- La difunta pleiteada en la literatura española: estudio de literatura comparada, in Revista de Archivos, (1909)
- Fábulas y cuentos en verso, Madrid: Sucesores de Hernando, (1933)
- Don Juan Manuel y los cuentos medievales, Madrid: Instituto Escuela, (1936)
- De Lope de Vega y del Romancero, Zaragoza: Librería General, (1953)
- Romancero tradicional de los lenguas hispánicas, 7 vols. Madrid: Gredos, (1957–1970)
