= Graff (lunar crater) =

Lunar surface depression

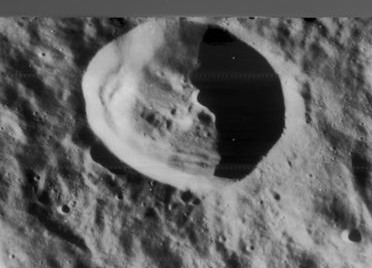
- Lunar Orbiter 4 image
- Coordinates: 42.4°S 88.6°W
- Diameter: 36 km
- Depth: Unknown
- Colongitude: 89° at sunrise
- Eponym: Kasimir R. Graff

Graff is a small lunar impact crater that lies along the southwestern limb of the Moon. It is located to the west of the Vallis Bouvard depression in the southern part of the ejecta blanket that surrounds the Mare Orientale impact basin. To the south-southwest is the smaller crater Catalán.

The outer rim of this crater is roughly circular, with a slight outward protrusion along the southern side. The rim and inner walls are not significantly eroded, and slope downward to a ring of accumulated debris surrounding the interior floor. The bottom is somewhat irregular, with a tiny crater near the midpoint and another to the northeast.

Because of its location, this crater is viewed obliquely by observers on the Earth, and its visibility can be affected by libration.

This crater lies within the Mendel-Rydberg Basin, a 630 km wide impact basin of Nectarian age.

== Satellite craters ==
By convention these features are identified on lunar maps by placing the letter on the side of the crater midpoint that is closest to Graff.

Graff	Latitude	Longitude	Diameter
A	41.2° S	86.1° W	21 km
U	42.1° S	90.7° W	20 km
