= IC 4756 =

Open cluster in the constellation Serpens

- Image of star clusters IC 4756

Observation data (J2000 epoch)
- Right ascension: 18^{h} 38^{m} 31.2^{s}
- Declination: +05° 29′ 24″
- Distance: 1.3 kly (400 pc)
- Apparent magnitude (V): 4.6

Physical characteristics
- Other designations: Cr 386, Mel 210

Associations
- Constellation: Serpens

IC 4756 is a large bright open cluster in the constellation Serpens. Also known as Graff's Cluster, it is bright enough to be seen with the naked eye and considered a fine cluster for binoculars or small telescopes.

IC 4756 is also known as the Tweedledee Cluster (paired with NGC 6633 as Tweedledum), also as the Secret Garden Cluster.

Metallicity of IC 4756 is similar to the Sun, at −0.02±0.01 dex.

It was discovered by Solon Bailey, and independently by Kasimir Graff in 1922.

== Stars ==
There are some noteworthy stars in the cluster. HD 172365 is a likely post-blue straggler in the IC 4756 that contains a large excess of lithium. HD 172189, also in IC 4756, is an Algol variable eclipsing binary with a 5.70 day period. The primary star in the system is also a Delta Scuti variable, undergoing multiple pulsation frequencies, which, combined with the eclipses, causes the system to vary by around a tenth of a magnitude.

== See also ==
- Kasimir Graff
