= Catalán (crater) =

Lunar surface depression

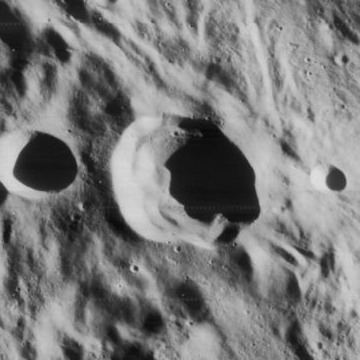
- Lunar Orbiter 4 image
- Coordinates: 45.7°S 87.3°W
- Diameter: 26.77 km (16.63 mi)
- Depth: Unknown
- Colongitude: 88° at sunrise
- Eponym: Miguel A. Catalán

Catalán is a small lunar impact crater that lies along the southwest limb of the Moon. At this position the crater is ill-suited for observation from the Earth as it is viewed almost from the side, and visibility is subject to libration effects. It lies to the west of the somewhat larger crater Baade, and south-southeast of Graff. This region is located in the outer southeastern part of the skirt of ejecta that surrounds the Mare Orientale impact basin, and the nearby surface is rugged and streaky.

This is a somewhat irregular crater, although in general form it is circular. The rim is sharp-edged and displays little appearance of erosion. Sections of the inner wall appear to have slumped along the north and southeast, forming notches in the rim. The interior floor is rough and irregular, with no central peak of note.

Due west of Catalán, the satellite craters Catalán A and the smaller Catalán B form a joined pair, with each having a sharp rim and a bowl-shaped interior. To the northwest of Catalán A is the nearly symmetrical, bowl-shaped Catalán U.

This crater is named after the Spanish scientist Miguel Antonio Catalán Sañudo (1894–1957) for his contributions to spectroscopy, an important instrument in astronomy. This designation was officially adopted by the International Astronomical Union in 1970.

== Satellite craters ==
By convention these features are identified on lunar maps by placing the letter on the side of the crater midpoint that is closest to Catalán.

Catalán	Latitude	Longitude	Diameter
A	45.7° S	89.2° W	21 km
B	45.6° S	88.4° W	14 km
U	45.1° S	90.6° W	20 km
