= Gonzalo Menéndez-Pidal =

Spanish historian, cartographer, and photographer (1911–2008)

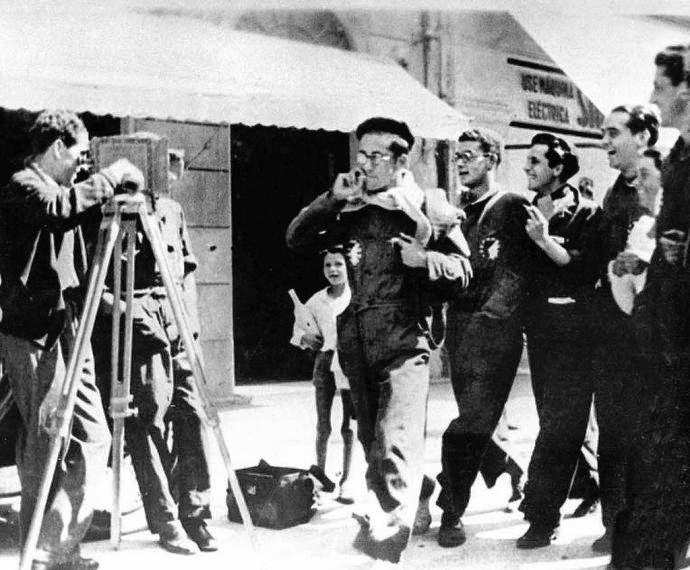
Gonzalo Menéndez Pidal records Lorca and other members of La Barraca in Calle Capitán Galán (Calle Príncipe) in Vigo, August 1932.

Gonzalo Menéndez-Pidal (April 12, 1911 – December 11, 2008) was a Spanish historian, cartographer, cinematographer, photographer, and archivist. He was the youngest historian to ever be admitted to the Royal Academy of History.

== Family ==
He was the son of Ramon Menendez Pidal and Maria Goyri de Menendez Pidal, who was the first woman to officially graduate from a Spanish university, the Universidad de Madrid.

== Education and career ==
Gonzalo Menéndez Pidal travelled to Munich at the age of seventeen to study Vulgar Latin with Karl Vossler and Philosophy of History with Pinder. Gonzalo Menendez-Pidal combined his family's fascination with the history of the Iberian Peninsula with an interest in the latest technologies. Gonzalo Menendez-Pidal studied cinematography at the Film und Bildamt der Stadt Berlin. He filmed his experiences as he travelled through Spain in the time leading up to the Spanish Civil War. Most of his films were anthropological documentaries; one set chronicles such as “La Barraca”, which he created with Federico García Lorca and others. His other works are Dieciocho de julio, número 2 - Madrid (1936), Guerra en el campo (1936) and Ávila, ayer y hoy (1943).

Gonzalo Menendez-Pidal is also known for photography. He catalogued Spanish tools and hardware, among other objects. He lived in the mountains outside of Madrid and maintained a photographic archive of the history of Spain that showed how the country was built, a tribute to the ingenuity of the Spaniards.

In the last years of his life, Menéndez-Pidal wrote and published: "Towards a New Image of the World". In this book, he laid out the essentials of human evolution from antiquity to modern times.
