= 1611 Beyer =

Asteroid

Discovery
- Discovered by: K. Reinmuth
- Discovery site: Heidelberg Obs.
- Discovery date: 17 February 1950

Designations
- Named after: Max Beyer (astronomer)
- Alternative designations: 1950 DJ · 1958 RE
- Minor planet category: main-belt · (outer); Hygiea

Orbital characteristics
- Epoch 4 September 2017 (JD 2458000.5)
- Uncertainty parameter 0
- Observation arc: 67.10 yr (24,510 days)
- Aphelion: 3.6837 AU
- Perihelion: 2.6637 AU
- Semi-major axis: 3.1737 AU
- Eccentricity: 0.1607
- Orbital period (sidereal): 5.65 yr (2,065 days)
- Mean anomaly: 150.69°
- Mean motion: 0° 10^{m} 27.48^{s} / day
- Inclination: 4.2818°
- Longitude of ascending node: 237.54°
- Argument of perihelion: 75.717°

Physical characteristics
- Mean diameter: 15.46±4.34 km 23.25±1.77 km 24.30 km (calculated); 24.444±0.192 km
- Synodic rotation period: 13.2608±0.0113 h 13.29 h
- Geometric albedo: 0.057 (assumed); 0.062±0.014; 0.10±0.08; 0.101±0.017
- Spectral type: C (assumed)
- Absolute magnitude (H): 11.30 · 11.538±0.001 (R) · 11.70 · 11.8 · 11.93±0.21 · 12.08

1611 Beyer, provisional designation 1950 DJ, is a carbonaceous Hygiean asteroid from the outer region of the asteroid belt, approximately 20 kilometers in diameter. It was discovered on 17 February 1950, by German astronomer Karl Reinmuth at Heidelberg Observatory in southern Germany. It was named after astronomer Max Beyer.

== Classification and orbit ==
Beyer is a member of the Hygiea family (601), a very large family of carbonaceous outer-belt asteroids, named after the fourth-largest asteroid, 10 Hygiea. It orbits the Sun in the outer main-belt at a distance of 2.7–3.7 AU once every 5 years and 8 months (2,065 days). Its orbit has an eccentricity of 0.16 and an inclination of 4° with respect to the ecliptic. Its observation arc begins with its official discovery observation, as no precoveries were taken, and no prior identifications were made.

== Physical characteristics ==
Beyer is a carbonaceous C-type asteroid.

=== Rotation period ===
Astronomers Pierre Antonini and Silvano Casulli obtained a rotational light-curve of Beyer from photometric observations taken in July 2009. It gave a rotation period of 13.29 hours with a brightness variation of 0.35 magnitude (U=2+). In October 2010, observations in the R-band at the Palomar Transient Factory gave a similar period of 13.2608 hours and an amplitude of 0.12 magnitude (U=2).

=== Diameter and albedo ===
According to the surveys carried out by the Japanese Akari satellite and NASA's Wide-field Infrared Survey Explorer with its subsequent NEOWISE mission, Beyer measures between 15.46 and 24.44 kilometers in diameter, and its surface has an albedo between 0.062 and 0.101. The Collaborative Asteroid Lightcurve Link assumes a standard albedo for carbonaceous asteroids of 0.057 and calculates a diameter of 24.30 kilometers with an absolute magnitude of 11.8.

== Naming ==
This minor planet was named by the discoverer for Max Beyer (1894–1982), German astronomer at the Bergedorf Observatory in Hamburg. Beyer was also on the post-war editorial board of the Astronomische Gesellschaft. The official naming citation was published by the Minor Planet Center in December 1959 (M.P.C. 1948).
