= NGC 6633 =

Open cluster in the constellation of Ophiuchus

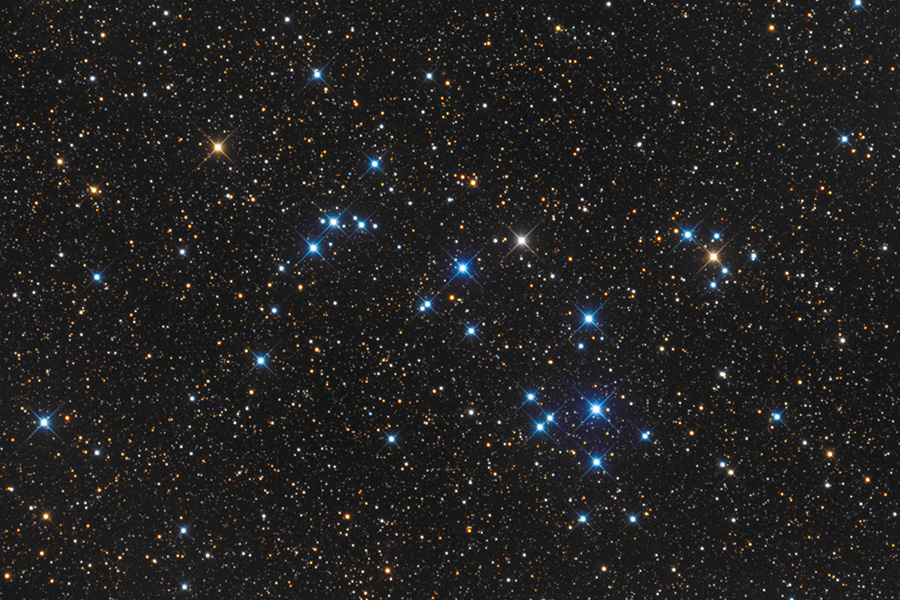
- Open cluster NGC 6633

Observation data (J2000.0 epoch)
- Right ascension: 18^{h} 27.7^{m}
- Declination: 6° 34′
- Distance: 1.04 kly
- Apparent magnitude (V): 4.6
- Apparent dimensions (V): 27′

Physical characteristics
- Estimated age: 550 million years
- Other designations: NGC 6633, De Cheseaux No. 3 H VIII.72, Cr 380, Mel 201

Associations
- Constellation: Ophiuchus

NGC 6633, also known as the Captain Hook Cluster or Wasp-Waist Cluster, is a large bright open cluster in the constellation Ophiuchus. Discovered in 1745-46 by Philippe Loys de Chéseaux, it was independently rediscovered by Caroline Herschel in 1783 and included in her brother William's catalog as H VIII.72. Bright enough to be seen with the naked eye, the cluster is considered a fine object for binoculars or small telescopes.

NGC 6633 is also known as the Tweedledum Cluster (paired with IC 4756 as Tweedledee), also as the Captain Hook Cluster and the Wasp Cluster. It is also designated Collinder 380 or Melotte 201. Nearly as large as the full moon, the cluster contains 38 known stars and shines with a total magnitude of 4.6; the brightest star is of mag 7.6. Its age has been estimated at 550 million years.

The cluster contains at least one chemically peculiar star - NGC 6633 48 (BD+06 3755).

The 8th-magnitude binary star HD 169959 (NGC 6633 58) is within the line-of-sight of the open cluster but is not physically associated with it.

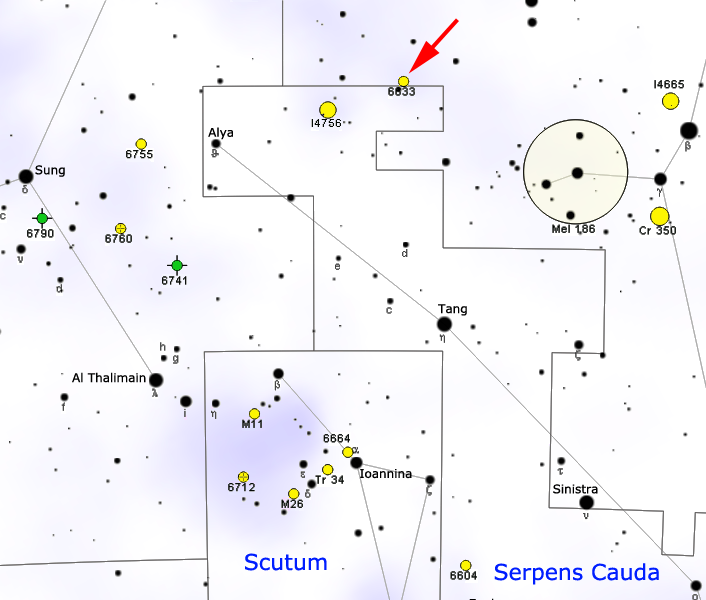
Map showing location of NGC 6633 (Roberto Mura)

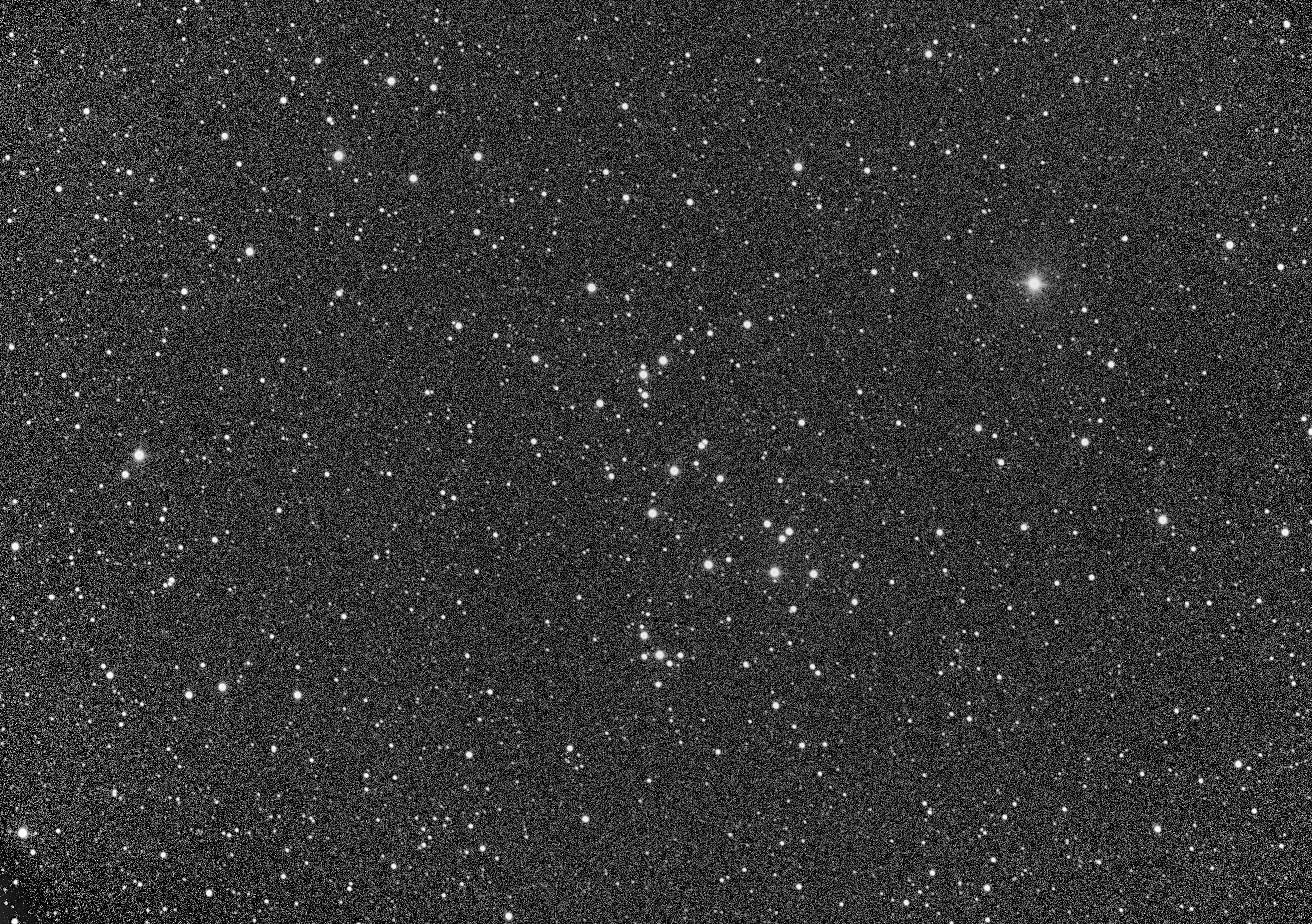
Image of the open cluster NGC 6633
