= Max Beyer =

German astronomer (1894–1982)

- Born: 22 October 1894; Hamburg
- Died: 14 November 1982 (aged 88); Hamburg
- Education: University of Hamburg
- Occupations: Teacher, Amateur Astronomer
- Years active: 1919 – 1977

Max Beyer (22 October 1894 – 14 November 1982) was a German amateur astronomer.

While attending the University of Hamburg, he became friends with Kasimir Graff. In the 1920s, Graff began inviting Beyer to monthly meetings at the Hamburg Observatory. Along with Graff, he worked to create the Beyer-Graff Star Atlas in the mid-1920s, published in 1925. In 1930, he discovered the comet C/1930 E1, also known as Beyer's Comet. He moved onto the grounds of the Hamburg Observatory in 1946. In 1951, the University of Hamburg awarded him an honorary doctorate. For multiple decades, he was the only person observing changes in cometary brightness over time, making him an invaluable source of data for the study of comets.

The asteroid 1611 Beyer is named after him.
