= Miguel A. Catalán =

Spanish spectroscopist

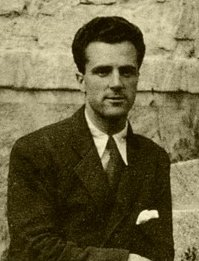
Miguel Antonio Catalán Sañudo (1920)

Miguel Antonio Catalán y Sañudo (1894–1957) was a Spanish spectroscopist.

== Biography ==
Miguel Antonio Catalán y Sañudo was born in Zaragoza, he obtained his degree in chemistry from the University of Zaragoza and received his doctorate in Madrid in 1917 for his thesis about spectrochemistry. In 1920, he began work as a researcher at Imperial College London. Examining the spectrum of the arc of manganese, he determined that the optical spectra of complex atoms consisted of groups of lines –which he called "multipletes"- between which existed certain characteristic regularities. Catalán demonstrated that study of the multipletes led to further understanding of the states of energy of atomic electrons.

On the invitation of Arnold Sommerfeld, he worked at the Ludwig-Maximilians-Universität München, and on the creation by the Rockefeller Foundation of the Institute of Physics and Chemistry (Madrid), in 1930 he was named head of the Spectroscopy Section. He was invited numerous times to work in the laboratories of the National Bureau of Standards (Washington, D.C.), Princeton University, and MIT.

He published more than 70 scientific articles in specialized journals. In 1926, he received a prize from the Real Academia de Ciencias (Spain) and in 1930, the international Pelfort prize.

From 1950 onwards, he served as director of the Departamento de Espectros del Instituto de Óptica de Madrid (C.S.I.C.). In 1952, he served as advisor to the Joint Commission for Spectroscopy, the head body for this field. In 1954, he became a member of the Real Academia de Ciencias (Madrid).

== Personal life ==
He married Jimena Menéndez-Pidal, the daughter of Royal Spanish Academy director Ramón Menéndez Pidal and María Goyri. Because of the military coup by General Francisco Franco in July 1936, he and his father-in-law were the subject of numerous misdemeanours.

Catalán died in Madrid in 1957.

== Legacy ==
The lunar crater Catalán is named after him.

Based on certain conjectures of Miguel Catalan about rotational dynamics, his disciple and biographer Gabriel Barceló, years later, developed the Theory of Dynamic Interactions.

=== The Miguel Catalán Investigation Award ===
The Government of the Comunidad de Madrid (Autonomous Region of Madrid) awards the Miguel Catalán Investigation Award in Science since 2005, to honor Catalán's memory. The award recognizes outstanding life accomplishments in research and science. The award winners each receive a medal, a citation and 42,000 Euros. Winners of this award are:

- José Elguero Bertolini (2005, chemist)
- Antonio Hernando Grande (2006, physicist)
- Amable Liñán Martínez (2007, aeronautical engineer)
- José Luis García Fierro (2008, chemist)
- Miguel Francisco Sánchez Madrid (2009, biologist)

Since 2008, a Miguel Catalán Investigation Award in Science for researchers under forty has also been awarded. The awards winners also receive a medal, a citation and 21,000 Euros. 50,000 Euros are also given to their institutions to fund their future work. Winners are:

- Oscar Fernández Carpetillo (2008, oncologist)
- Luis Raúl Sánchez Fernández (2009, physicist)
