= Kasimir Graff =

Polish-German astronomer

Kasimir Romuald Graff
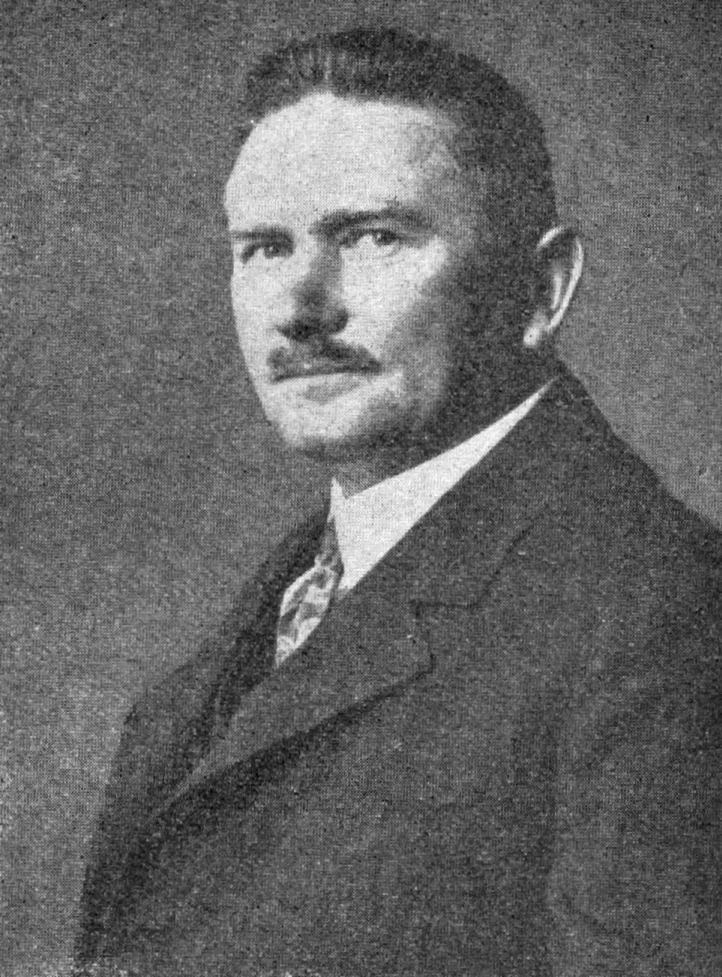
- Born: February 15, 1878; Próchnowo
- Died: February 7, 1950 (aged 71); Breitenfurt bei Wien
- Education: University of Berlin
- Spouses: Frida Hoffmann (m. 1905), Maria Frank (m. 1943)
- Parent(s): Stanislaus Graff, Valentina Graff

Kasimir Romuald Graff (7 February 1878 – 15 February 1950) was a Polish-German astronomer.

He began studies in astronomy and physics at the University of Berlin in 1897 and graduated in 1901. He began working at the Bergedorf Observatory in 1909. He then worked as an assistant at the Hamburg Observatory and became a professor at the University of Hamburg in 1917. In 1928 he became director of the Vienna Observatory, Austria. Along with astronomer Max Beyer, he worked to create the Beyer-Graff Star Atlas.

Using a 60 cm telescope, he was very adept in creating planetary maps from visual observations. He also worked on measuring radiation emitted from stars, and invented and built new instrumentation for this purpose. This included new types of calorimeter and photometer detectors.

When the Nazi government took over in Austria in 1938, he was forced to retire. It is likely that his family background and his rejection of the Nazi-supported philosophy of "Welteislehre" was the reason, although he officially was removed because of unproven charges of embezzlement. He was reinstated in 1945, and he retired in 1949.

== Honors ==
- The lunar crater Graff, as well as Martian crater Graff, are named after Graff.
- IC 4756, Also known as Graff's Cluster, is named for him.
