= Álvaro Galmés de Fuentes =

Spanish philologist

- Born: 11 November 1924; Madrid, Spain
- Died: 5 February 2003 (aged 78)
- Education: Complutense University of Madrid; University of Zurich
- Occupations: Arabist, professor and linguist
- Family: Ramón Menéndez Pidal (great uncle)
- Awards: Premio Nacional de Investigación "Ramón Menéndez Pidal" (2002)

Álvaro Galmés de Fuentes (11 November 1924 – 5 February 2003) was a Spanish philologist, dialectologist, and arabist. He was considered one of the leading authorities in romance and Arabic philology both nationally and internationally.

== Early life and education ==
Galmés was born on 11 November 1924 in Madrid, and was the great nephew and pupil of Spanish philologist and historian, Ramón Menéndez Pidal. He studied Romance Philology at the University of Madrid where he graduated in 1947. Whilst a student at the university, he also completed a course in Arabic between 1943 and 1947, and later studied Arabic at the University of Zurich between 1947 and 1949. He was awarded the Premio Extraordinario in 1954 for his doctoral thesis on the stylistic and syntactic influences of Arabic on medieval Spanish prose.

== Career ==
Galmés held positions in several institutions in both Spain and abroad during his career in academia. In 1957, he became a professor in Romance Philology at the University of La Laguna, a position that he held for five years before moving to the Ludwig-Maximilians-Universität München as a visiting professor until 1964. While at the university, he was also the director of the Instituto Español de Cultura (Spanish Institute of Culture).

Galmés returned to Spain in 1964 to assume a post as professor in Arabic Language and Literature at the University of Oviedo. While at Oviedo, he not only held the position as head of department and dean of the faculty, but was also responsible for the formation of a group of researchers that published numerous studies on romance, Arabic, and Moorish dialectology and literature.

During his career, Galmés had the opportunity to work as a visiting professor in the US at both the University of Wisconsin in 1969 and Princeton University between 1975 and 1976. In 1987, he assumed the role of professor of Romance Philology at the Complutense University of Madrid.

== Notable achievements ==
- In 1989, Galmés sponsored the foundation of the annual publication Aljamía, which provided bibliographical information on Mudéjars, Moors, Arabic texts, and Arab-romance philology.
- He was elected a permanent member of the Real Academia de la Historia in 1996 and was inaugurated that same year.
- Galmés was an honorary member of the Academia de la Lengua Asturiana (Academy of the Asturian Language), and a board member of the Comité Internacional de Estudios Moriscos (International Committee of Moorish Studies).
- He became an emeritus professor in Romance Philology in 2001.
- He was awarded the Premio Nacional de Investigación "Ramón Menéndez Pidal" de Humanidades in 2002 by King Juan Carlos I of Spain for upholding the tradition of Hispanic philology and his innovative contributions to the field from romance and semitic perspectives.

== Published works ==
- Influencias sintácticas y estilísticas del árabe en la prosa medieval castellana (1955, 1996)
- Las sibilantes en la Romania (1962)
- Épica árabe y épica castellana (1978)
- El libro de las batallas, narraciones caballerescas aljamiado-moriscas (1975)
- Historia de los amores de París y Viena (1970)
- Dialectología mozárabe (1983)
- Los moriscos (desde su misma orilla) (1993)
- Las jarchas mozárabes. Forma y significado (1994)
- El amor cortés en la lírica árabe y en la lírica provenzal (1996)
