= Catalán (surname) =

Catalán (pronounced [kataˈlan]) is a Spanish surname, literally meaning 'Catalan, from Catalonia'. Notable people with the surname include:

- Aarón Romero Catalán (born 1999), Spanish footballer
- Antonia Nava de Catalán (1779–1843), Mexican Independence fighter
- Alex Catalán (born 1968), Spanish filmmaker
- Alfredo Catalán (born 1968), Venezuelan politician
- Andrés Catalán (born 2000), Mexican professional footballer
- Blanca Catalán de Ocón (1860–1904), Spanish botanist
- Clotilde Catalán de Ocón (1863–1946), Spanish entomologist and poet
- Diego Catalán (1928–2008), Spanish philologist
- Emilio Arenales Catalán (1922–1969), Guatemalan politician
- Francesc Josep Catalán de Ocón, Spanish Roman Catholic prelate, Co-Prince of Andorra from 1757 to 1762
- Juan Francisco Marco y Catalán (1771–1828), Spanish Roman Catholic prelate
- Matías Catalán (born 1992), Argentine-born Chilean footballer
- Miguel A. Catalán (1894–1957), Spanish spectroscopist
- Nicolás Catalán (1780–1838), Mexican Independence fighter
- Rodrigo González Catalán (born 1995), Chilean footballer
- Sergio Catalán (born 1991), Chilean footballer
- Silvia Catalán, Spanish photographer
- Zaida Catalán (1980–2017), Swedish politician

== See also ==
- Catalán (crater), a lunar crater named for Miguel A. Catalán
- Catalan (disambiguation) § People
- Catalá
- Català (surname)
- Cathalán
- Amor a la Catalán, Chilean telenovela
- Liceo Mirella Catalán Urzúa, high school in Paredones, Cardenal Caro, Chile
