= Cathala =

Cathala (pronounced [katala]) is a French surname from Languedoc, chiefly Tarn, Aude and Hérault. It is derived from the Occitan word catalan (pronounced [kataˈla]), designating a person from Catalonia, Spain. Notable people with the surname include:

- Bruno Cathala (born 1955), French judge
- Frédéric Cathala (born 1962), French author
- Gabrielle Cathala (born 1992), French politician
- Jean Cathala (fl. 1645–1680), French singer, composer and cornettist
- Laurent Cathala (born 1945), French politician
- Pierre Cathala (1888–1947), French Minister of Finance from 1942 to 1944

== See also ==
- Catalá
- Català (surname)
- Cathalán
