= Catalá =

Catalá (pronounced [kataˈla]) is a Spanish surname of Catalan origin, literally meaning 'Catalan, from Catalonia'. Notable people with the surname include:

- Ana María Catalá (born 1993), Spanish footballer
- Concha Catalá (1881–1968), Spanish actress
- Héctor Catalá Laparra (born 1988), Spanish paraathlete
- José Catalá (born 1985), Spanish footballer
- José Agustín Catalá (1915–2011), Venezuelan journalist
- Luis Álvarez Catalá (1836–1901), Spanish painter
- Magín Catalá (1761–1830), Spanish Catholic missionary
- María José Catalá (born 1981), Spanish politician
- Rafael Catalá (born 1961), Spanish politician
- Ricardo Catalá (born 1982), Brazilian football coach
- Sebastià Sastre Catalá (born 1994), Spanish footballer

== See also ==
- SS Catala
- Català FC
- Català (surname)
- Catalán (surname)
- Cathala
