= Cathalán =

Cathalán (pronounced [ˈkahəlˠaːnˠ]) is an Old Irish male given name, a diminutive of Cathal. Notable people with the name include:

- Cathalán mac Indrechtaig (died 871), king of Ulaid
- Cathalán ua Corcráin (died 1001), Irish abbot

== See also ==
- Cahalan and Cahalane
- Cahillane
- Callan
- Cathala
- Catalán (surname)
- List of Irish-language given names
