= Català (surname) =

Català (pronounced [kətəˈla]) is a Catalan surname, literally meaning 'Catalan, from Catalonia'. Notable people with the surname include:

- David Català (born 1980), Spanish football manager and former player
- Enric Morera Català (born 1964), Spanish politician
- Maria Assumpció Català i Poch (1925–2009), Spanish mathematician and astronomer
- Víctor Català, pen name of Caterina Albert (1869–1966), Spanish writer

== See also ==
- SS Catala
- Català FC
- Catalá
- Catalán (surname)
- Cathala
