= Cahalan =

Cahalan is an Anglicized Irish surname derived from the given name Cathalán. Notable people with the surname include:

- Adrienne Cahalan (born 1964), Australian sailor
- Cissie Cahalan (1876–1948), Irish suffragette
- Robert Cahalan (born 1946), American atmospheric scientist
- Sinéad Cahalan, Irish camogie player
- Susannah Cahalan (born 1985), American journalist and author
- Vera Cahalan Bushfield (1889–1976), American politician

== See also ==
- Cahalane, surname
- Cahillane, a surname
