= Cahalane =

Cahalane is an Anglicized Irish surname derived from the given name Cathalán. Notable people with the surname include:

- Conor Cahalane (born 1997), Irish hurler and Gaelic footballer
- Damien Cahalane (born 1992), Irish hurler and Gaelic footballer
- Jack Cahalane (born 2002), Irish hurler and Gaelic footballer
- Michael Cahalane (born 1995), Irish hurler
- Niall Cahalane (born 1963), Irish Gaelic footballer

== See also ==
- Cahalan, a surname
- Cahillane, a surname
