= Chilpancingo National Airport =

Airfield in Chilpancingo, Guerrero, Mexico

Chilpancingo Airfield Aeropuerto de Chilpancingo
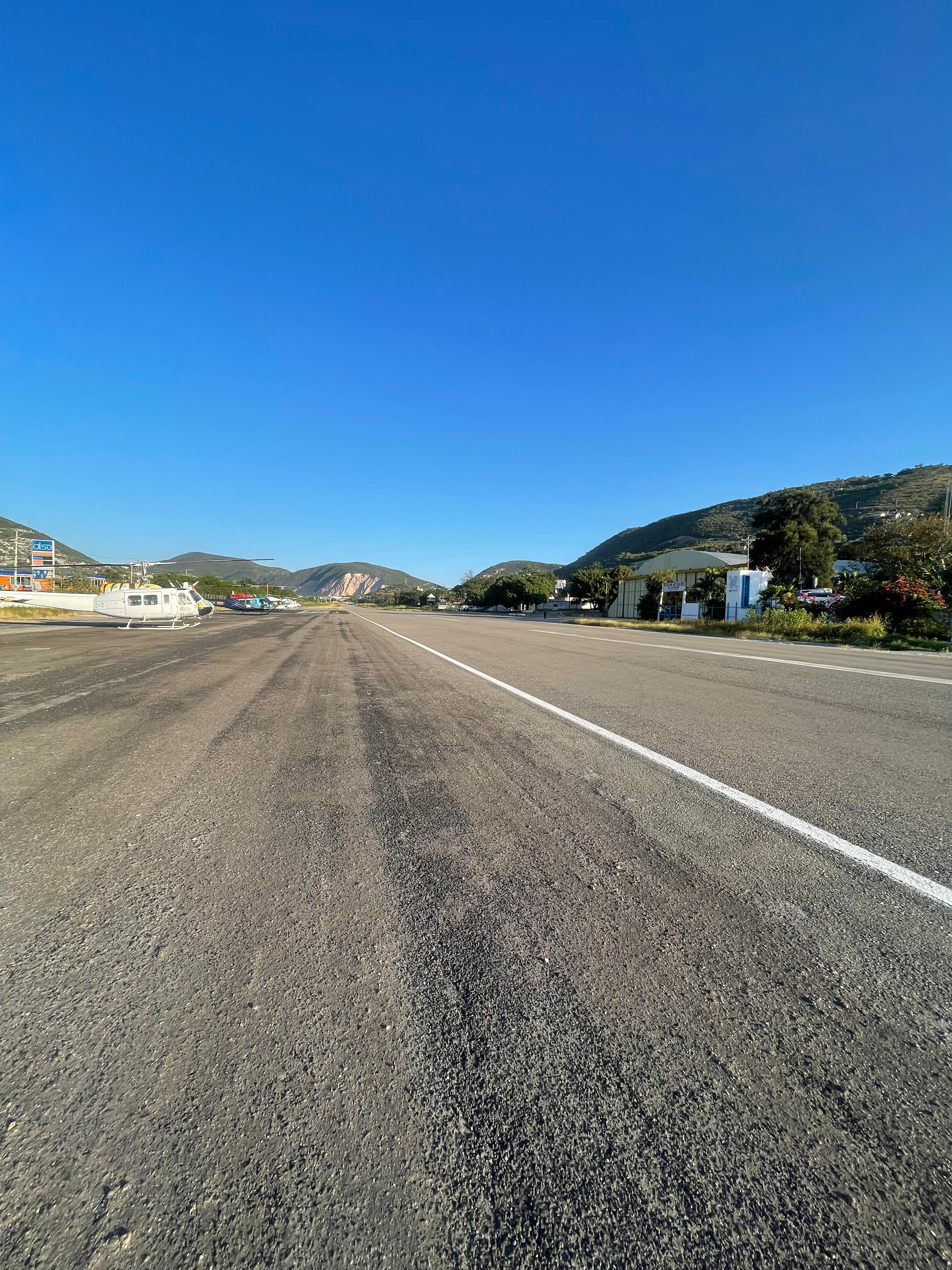
- IATA: none; ICAO: MMCH; LID: CHG

Summary
- Airport type: Public
- Serves: Chilpancingo, Guerrero, Mexico
- Time zone: CST (UTC-06:00)
- Elevation AMSL: 1,279 m / 4,196 ft
- Coordinates: 17°34′26″N 99°30′52″W

Map
- Location of airport in Guerrero MMCH (Mexico)

Runways
Direction	Length		Surface
Direction	m	ft	Surface
33/15	1,406	4,613	Asphalt

Statistics (2023)
- Total passengers: N/A
- Source: Agencia Federal de Aviación Civil

Chilpancingo Airfield (Spanish: Aeropuerto de Chilpancingo); officially Aeródromo Nicolás Bravo (Nicolás Bravo Aerodrome) (ICAO: MMCH, FAA LID: CHG) is a small airfield located in Chilpancingo, Guerrero, Mexico. It handles domestic air traffic and supports flight training and general aviation activities. The airfield is named in honor of the Mexican President Nicolás Bravo. It does not provide scheduled passenger public services. The nearest airport that serves commercial flights is Acapulco International Airport.

In the early 1960s, the regional airline Aerolíneas del Sur operated a route between Chilpancingo and Puebla with stopovers at the now defunct Tlapa Airfield, Huamuxtitlán, Olinalá, Alcozauca, Tlalixtaquilla, and Malinaltepec.

Situated at an elevation of 1,279 metres (4,196 ft) above mean sea level, it features a single asphalt runway, designated as 15/33, measuring 1,406 by 20 metres (4,613 by 66 ft). Adjacent facilities include small hangars, heliports, and unpaved parking positions for aircraft. The airfield is constrained by its location in a densely populated area of the city.

== Gallery ==
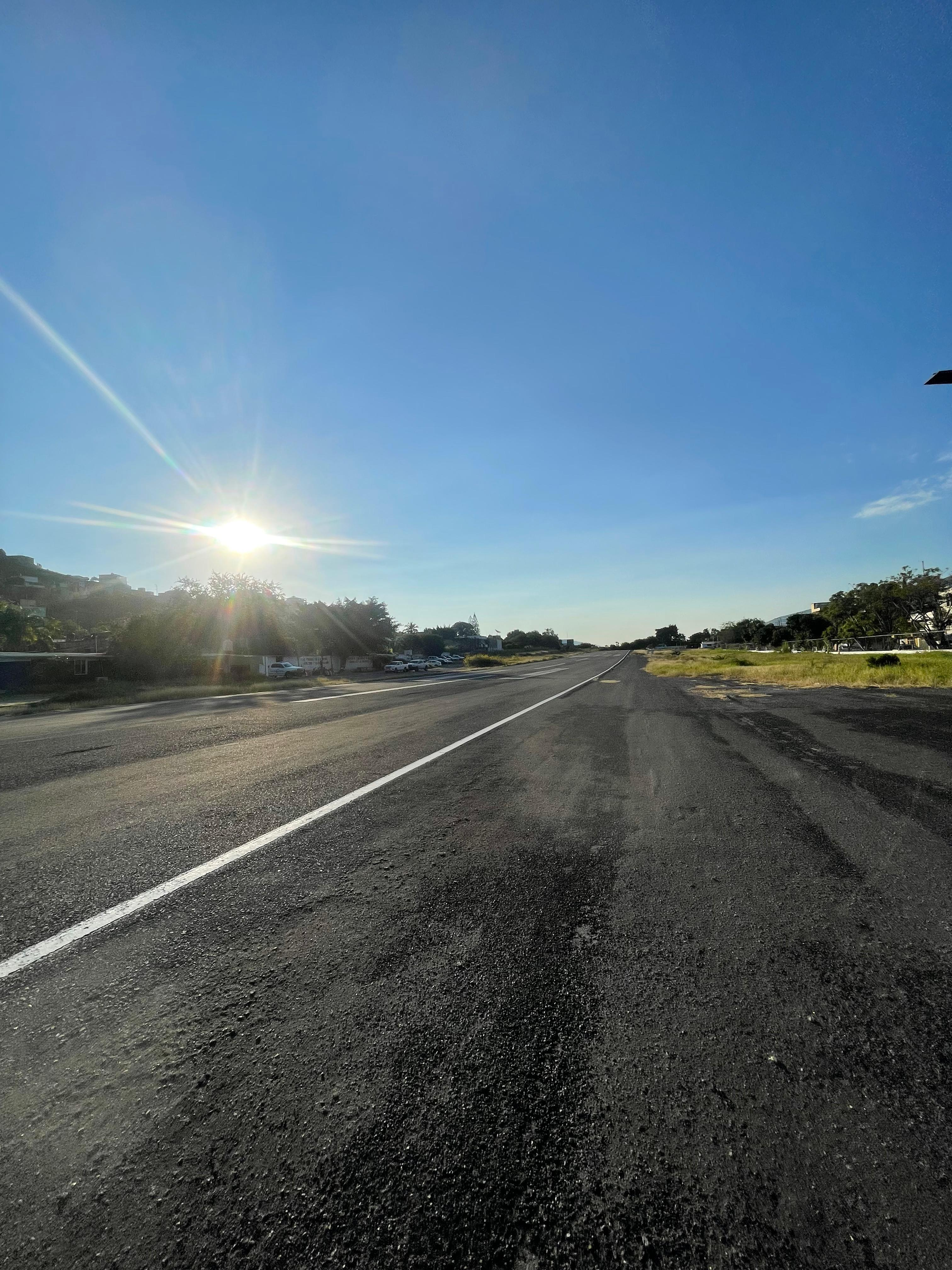

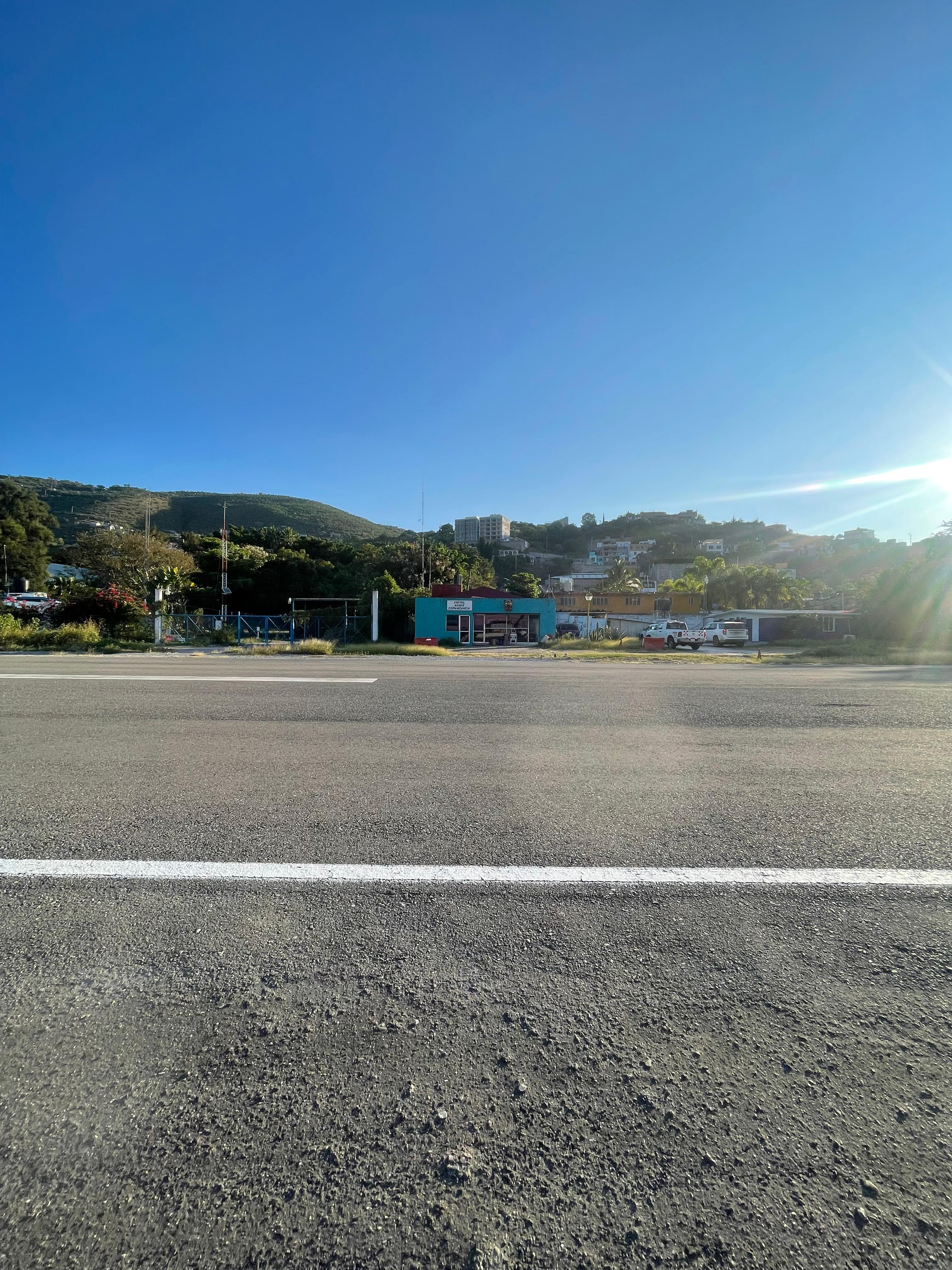

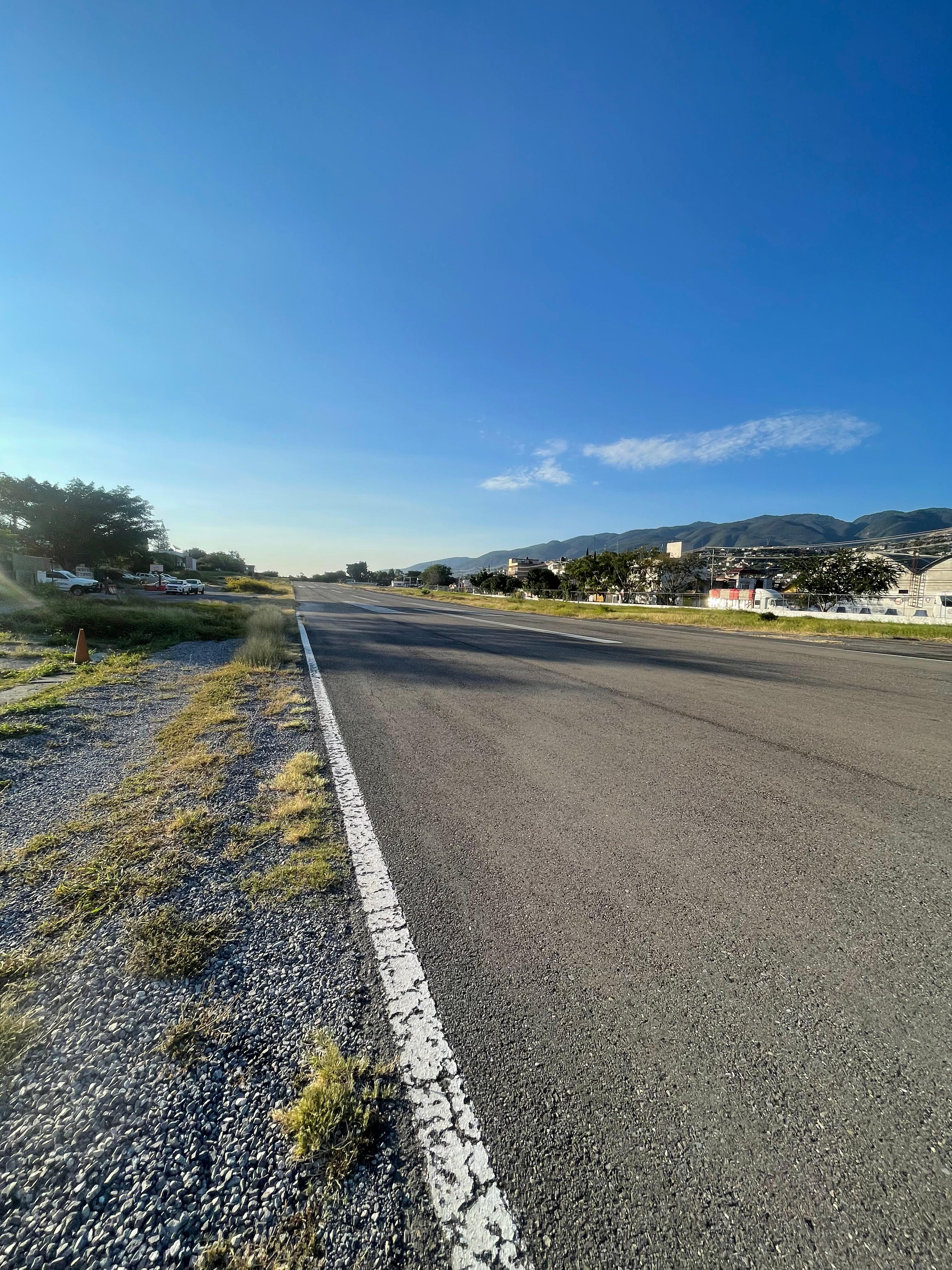

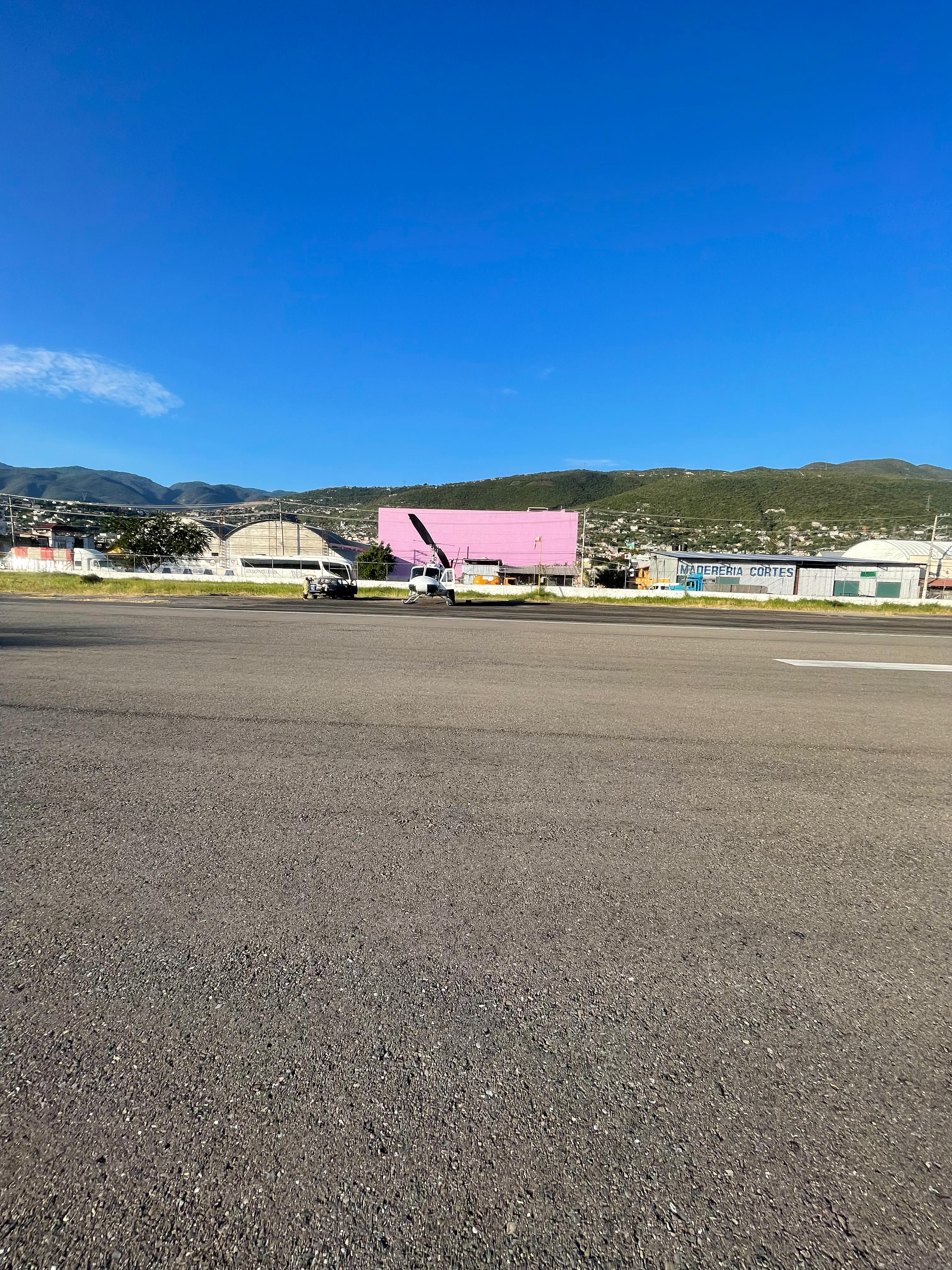

== See also ==
- List of the busiest airports in Mexico
- List of airports in Mexico
- List of airports by ICAO code: M
- List of busiest airports in North America
- List of the busiest airports in Latin America
- Transportation in Mexico
