= Tià Sastre =

Spanish footballer

Personal information
- Full name: Sebastià Sastre Catalá
- Date of birth: 21 June 1994 (age 32)
- Place of birth: Vilafranca de Bonany, Spain
- Height: 1.72 m (5 ft 7 1/2 in)
- Position: Attacking midfielder

Team information
- Current team: Manacor

Youth career
- Mallorca

Senior career*
Years	Team	Apps	(Gls)
2011–2017	Mallorca B	104	(3)
2011–2016	Mallorca	4	(0)
2016	→ Hospitalet (loan)	14	(1)
2017–2018	Celta B	12	(0)
2018–2019	Alcúdia	33	(17)
2019–2020	Poblense	22	(10)
2020–2023	Manacor	69	(11)
2024–	Manacor	2	(0)

International career
2012	Spain U18	1	(0)
- * Club domestic league appearances and goals as of 14 September 2024

Sebastià "Tià" Sastre Catalá (born 21 June 1994) is a Spanish footballer who plays as an attacking midfielder for Manacor.

== Football career ==
Born in Vilafranca de Bonany, Balearic Islands, Sastre grew in the youth ranks of local giants RCD Mallorca. On 14 December 2011, whilst still a junior, he made his official debut with the first team, playing 31 minutes in a 0–1 home loss against Sporting de Gijón for the season's Copa del Rey.

Sastre subsequently spent the following campaigns appearing mainly for the reserves in Segunda División B. On 7 June 2015 he made his Segunda División debut, coming on as a late substitute for fellow youth graduate Damià Sabater in a 0–2 away loss against CD Mirandés.

On 29 January 2016, Sastre was loaned to CE L'Hospitalet in the third division, until June. On 28 August of the following year he moved to another reserve team, Celta de Vigo B in the same category.
