= Maria Assumpció Català i Poch =

Spanish mathematician and astronomer

Professor Maria Assumpció Català i Poch
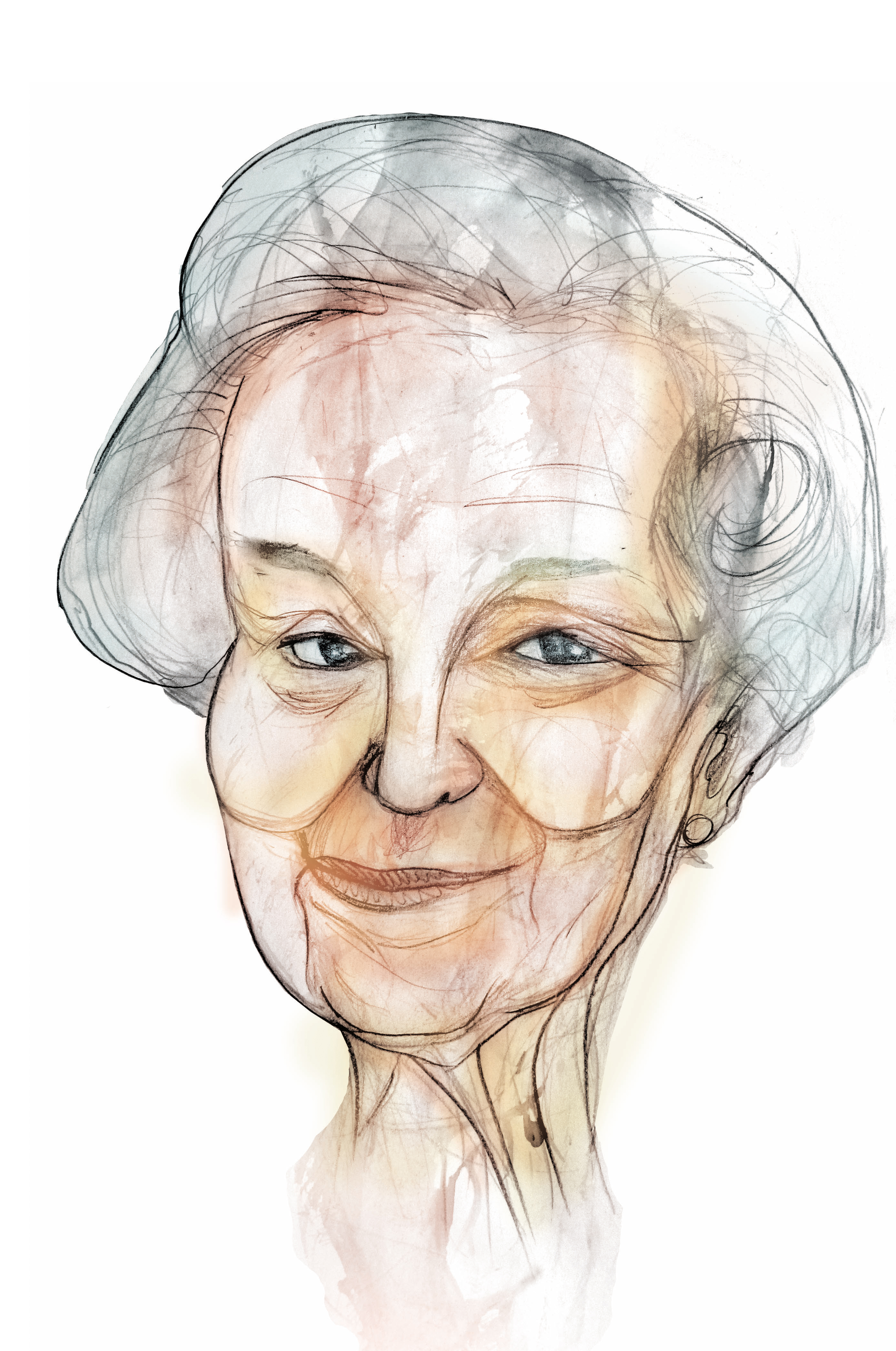
- Born: July 14, 1925; Barcelona, Spain
- Died: July 3, 2009 (aged 83)
- Scientific career
- Fields: Astronomy; Mathematics

María Assumpció Català i Poch (Barcelona, 14 July 1925 – ib. 3 July 2009) was a Spanish professor, mathematician, and astronomer. She taught from 1952 to 1991. She started as an assistant in the Astronomy Section of the Seminar on Mathematics in Barcelona, related to the Spanish National Research Council (in Spanish, Consejo Superior de Investigaciones Científicas, from this point forward abbreviated to, CSIC). Later, she worked in the Henri Poincaré Institute and she also cooperated in some projects with the special chair of Technology in the Polytechnic University of Catalonia.

In 1970, she was the first woman to earn a science PhD in the Mathematics Section of the University of Barcelona (UB). Her thesis's name was: Contribución al estudio de la dinámica de los sistemas estelares de simetría cilíndrica (in English, Contribution to the study of the dynamics of stellar systems with cylindrical symmetry). She performed systematic monitorings of sunspots and calculations of orbits and eclipses for more than thirty years.

She directed eleven degree theses and seven doctoral theses. In addition, she represented Spain in the Commission 46 on the Education of the Astronomy of the International Astronomical Union for 15 years and she worked as the scientific consultant for the Astronomy section of the Spanish version of National Geographic magazine.

She retired in 1984, but she continued contact with the astronomy and university communities, attending events such as the biannual meetings of the Spanish Society of Astronomy.

== Biography ==
=== Early years ===
Her father, Albert Català, worked in banking, and her mother, Assumpció Poch, was a teacher who stopped working when they got married. Such situation of a woman quitting her job after marrying was typical during that time. Català i Poch was the oldest of five children: four daughters and a son.

Due to Català's father's work, the family moved to Montblanc when she was a child. Poch began school there but they quickly returned, so she continued with her primary studies in Escuelas Católicas del Sagrado Corazón and María Inmaculada of Barcelona.

=== Higher education ===
When the Spanish Civil War ended, she studied Bachillerato, which is the stage of education for people over the age of 16 in Spain, at the high school Instituto Maragall. In 1947 she started studying at the UB. At that time, it was rare for a woman to study, however, her father wanted all his children to have the opportunity for education if they wanted to.

In spite of the support of Català's father, it was their uncle, Jaume Poch i Garí, who taught them the interesting facts of the universe. Poch i Garí was a professor of Geography, but he had such a passion for Astronomy that he added it as a subject in the teaching diploma study plan during the post-Spanish-Civil-war era. Poch i Garí carried their nephew and nieces to a mountain and he taught them to search the cardinal points or to figure out the time of day observing the shadow of the branches. When it got dark, he showed them the secrets of the universe, instilling Català his passion for Astronomy. Then, when she was in high school, Poch i Garí gave her astronomical and philosophical problems to solve for practice.

At that time at the UB, Astronomy could only be studied in the degree of Mathematics. When Català started, only four more women were studying there, but that number actually decreased. By the time she began in the third course, she ended up as the only woman in the faculty. In 1953 she obtained the degree and continued studying to earn the PHD. Following in the family tradition, and also because of the precarious economic situation of the post-Spanish-Civil-war era, she sat for the public official exam to qualify for secondary school teaching in Mathematics. She taught from 1963 until 1975 in the high school Instituto Infanta Isabel of Barcelona.

In 1971 she passed her doctoral thesis, which made her the first woman with a Ph.D. in Mathematics in the UB, and she started working as professor in the Department of Astronomy of the UB.

=== Professional career ===
She started working while she attended courses that she needed to obtain the doctorate. From 1952 to 1970 she worked as an assistant of practical lessons of the subjects General Astronomy and Topography, Spherical Astronomy and Geodesy, Mathematics, Special Mathematics, Mathematics enlargement for chemists and Rational Mechanics and Topic in Celestial Mechanics in the Department of Sciences of the UB.

In the academic year 1957–1958, however, the tables turned, and she took charge of the Department of Sciences of the UB. She also headed the department from 1968 to 1971. Between 1960 and 1974 she worked as associate professor in that department and from 1965 to 1967, she was professor of mathematics in the Department of Pharmacy.

From 1971 until the beginning of the 80s, she cooperated with the Special Chair of Space Technologies in the Polytechnic University of Catalonia giving classes of Astrodynamics and Celestial Mechanics.

In 1975 she started working as assistant professor in the Department of Physics of the UB after passing the public exams to become a teacher of Astronomy. Such a position made her the first woman astronomer who worked as professor at a Spanish university. Between 1982 and 1984, she worked as associate professor teaching Astronomy, Astrophysics, Geophysics and Geodesy; the last of which she taught when it was reestablished in the Department of Astronomy and Meteorology of the UB. For that reason, she scientifically cooperated with the Cartographic Institute of Catalonia.

At the same time, the doctor spoke at specific seminars and specialized courses about astronomy. Furthermore, she worked in order to ensure the visibility of women in the field of astronomy, taking part in Ella es astrónoma (in English, She is astronomer), a group which aims to defend the role of women in this discipline. She also participated in Mujeres en las estrellas (in English, Women in the stars) which was a TV channel of the National University of Distance Education.

As well as having been a teacher and a professor, she also held position in some important international and national organizations. For example, she has been a member of the International Astronomical Union since 1976 and, for 15 years, represented Spain in the Commission 46 of this union on the topic Education About Astronomy. Additionally, she was a member of the European Astronomical Society, the Spanish Society of Astronomy, the Catalan Society of History of Science and Technology and the Catalan Society of Mathematics. Since 1978 she also took part in the History of Science Studies Research Group and, since 1997, she was the scientific advisor of the Astronomy Section of the Spanish version of the magazine of National Geographic.

Moreover, she was a member of the Astronomy Teaching Commission created by the Direcció General de Batxillerat and sponsored by the Department of Earth and Cosmological Physics of the UB in 1983.

Apart from that, she wrote several books and notes as study material, for example, she wrote a book with astronomy notes which has been, and already is, used among the astronomy community.

She retired in 1990.

=== Research career ===
In 1954, Català obtained a scholarship from the CSIC to investigate Spherical Astronomy through calculations and rectification of orbits of comets. Additionally, in the International Geophysical Year (1957–1958), she worked on observational astronomy, calculation and rectification of orbits of comets, and daily observation of sunspots and prominences in the Observatory of the Chair of Astronomy of the UB in cooperation with the Spanish National Observatory. This collaboration had important results as the discovery of Van Allen radiation belt and the launch of the first satellite Sputnik 1.

Between 1974 and 1990 she also worked on the study of stellar systems dynamics. In 1978, the possession of a Catalan grant to promote the research in the university funded her research in spherical astronomy, eclipse, occultations, and transit calculations, stellar systems dynamics and galactic dynamics.

Between 1976 and 1979, she worked at the Henri Poincaré Institute because of a program of Spanish-French scientific cooperation and the University of Paris VI. On the other hand, she researched the structure of the Oort cloud at the Observatorie de Meudon.

Català had also the opportunity to take part in different financed projects such as that of the European Space Agency which aimed to select and determine the stellar and planetary positions using Hipparcos satellite.

Besides her research works, she also studied the Arab science and left works such as Las obras matemáticas de Maslama de Madrid (1965), Arquímedes árabe: el tratado de los círculos tangentes (1968) and Dos tratados del Arquímedes árabe: tratado de los círculos tangentes y el libro de los triángulos (1971).

== Awards and honors ==
- Professor Emeritus as an honorary by the UB in 2004.
- Creu de Sant Jordi in 2009.

=== Eponymous ===
- Name of the reflecting telescope Dall-Kirham in the observatory of Centre d'Observació de L'Univer in LLeida.
