= Concha Catalá =

Spanish actress

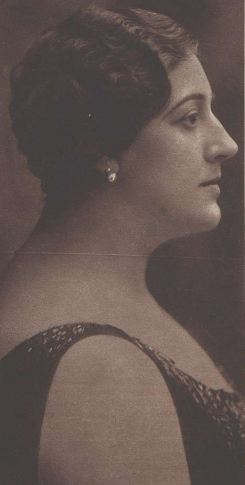
Concha Catalá

Concha Catalá (1881-1968) was a Spanish actress of Basque heritage and a pioneer of early Spanish theater in the early twentieth century.

== Early life ==
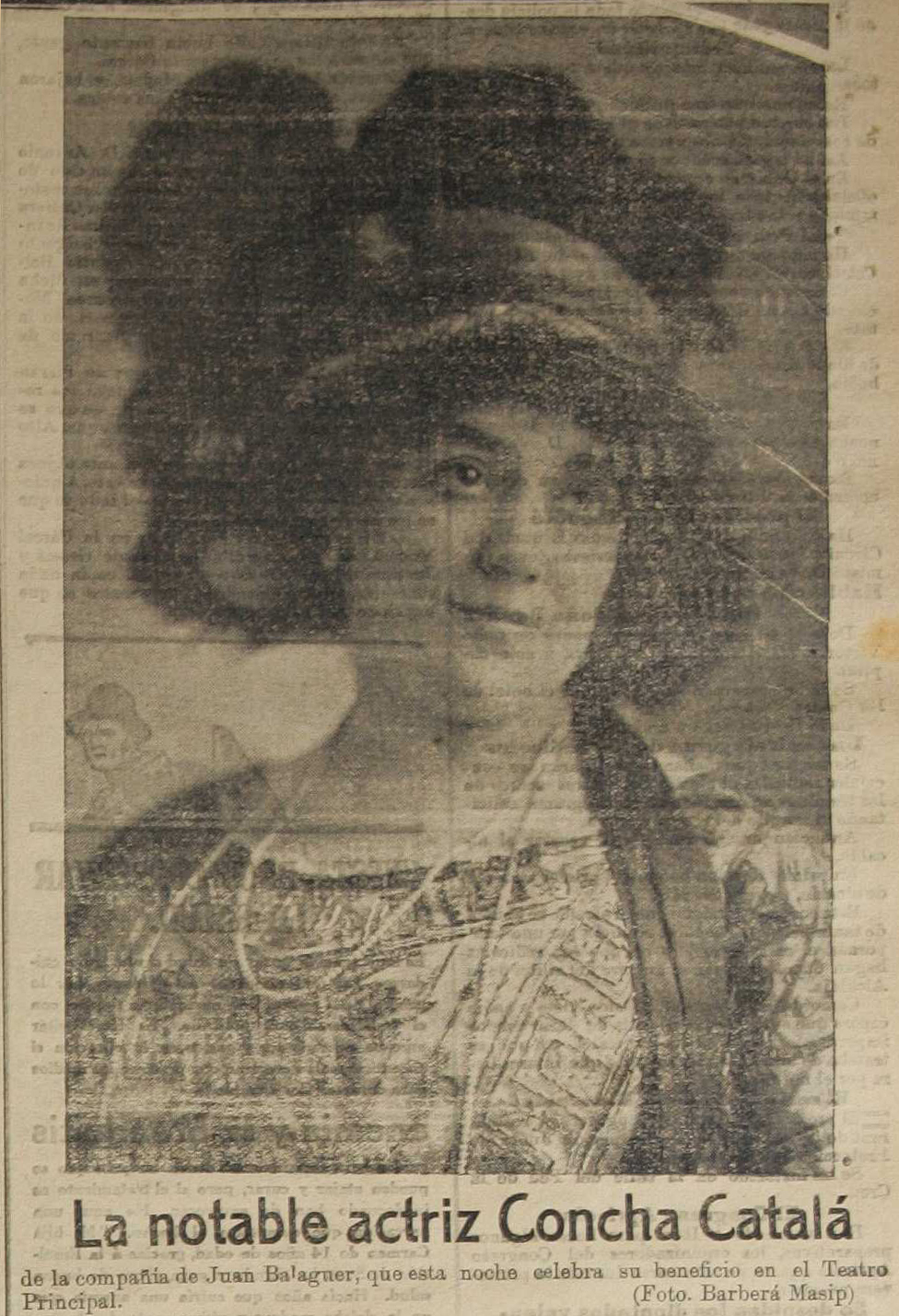
La notable actriz Concha Catalá, de Barberá Masip

Concepción García Paz Catalá was born on 11 February 1880 in Bilbao, Spain. Her father was a band leader and as a child, she moved with her family to Madrid. She studied at the French school of San Luis in Madrid and then moved to the Conservatory to study piano. She began studying theater under the teaching of Teodora Lamadrid.

== Career ==
Her professional debut occurred in 1900, in the play Los Galeotes at the Teatro de la Comedia in Madrid in the theater troupe of actress Rosario Pino. The following year, she performed in Las flores with the Quintero brothers.

In 1908, she appeared in La Corte de Napoleón with Ceferino Palencia and María Tubau. She worked with some of the most prestigious actors of the era including Enrique Borrás, María Guerrero and Fernando Díaz de Mendoza y Aguado, Francisco Morano, José Tallaví and José Vico, as well as writers and authors, including Jacinto Benavente, Henrik Ibsen and José María Pemán.

Though she made a few films, Una morena y una rubia (1933), Suspiros de España (1939) and Su hermano y él (1941), Catalá was primarily a stage actress. In 1940 she formed her own company with Manuel González, Carmen Carbonell and Antonio Vico, that they called Los Cuatro Ases (the Four Aces), and performed together for ten years.

== Recognition ==
In 1948, she received the Medal of Order of Alfonso X the Wise. Her last performance was of Pemán's play Doña Clarines in the 1962–1963 season at the Teatro Recoletos in Madrid.

Catalá died in Madrid on 3 July 1968.
