= Frédéric Cathala =

French writer

Frédéric Cathala (born 29 May 1962) is a French author.

== Bibliography ==
- L'Arbalète, La vraie vie commence, Grand Livre du Mois, 2003
- Le Théorème de Roitelet, Albin Michel, 2004
- Les Mille mots du citoyen Morille Marmouset, Albin Michel, 2006
- Grammaire : pour l'amour des mots, Enjeux-Les Echos, septembre 2006
- L'aigle et le phénix, Albin Michel, 2008
- Le Synode du cadavre, Les Indes savantes, 2012.
- 1857, KDP, 2017

== Critical reviews ==
- Alistair Rolls, « Fetishising the Parisian Text-Scape in Frédéric Cathala’s L’Arbalète : La vraie vie commence », AUMLA : Journal of the Australasian Universities Language & Literature Association, n° 108, pp. 111–29. Encyclopædia Britannica :(Read)
- Ian Dallas, Time of the Bedouin, Budgate Press, 2006, pages 59–60
- Valerio Cordiner, « Le théorème de Marmouset, ou la langue (peu) tranchante du Léviathan », in Présences du passé dans le roman français contemporain. Actes du colloque "Présences du passé dans la littérature française contemporaine", Roma, Bulzoni, collection Studi e testi 6, 2007, 244 p. ISBN 9788878702677
- Stéphane Corcuff, « L'aigle et le phénix, lecture du roman de Frédéric Cathala », in Sens public, revue internationale des politistes, 18 septembre 2008 (Read)
- Valerio Cordiner, Recensione di l’Aigle et le Phénix ou l’Innombrable et invincible armée du dissident Wu, Università di Roma Sapienza (Read), 2008
- Alistair Rolls, Paris and the Fetish: Primal Crime Scenes, Rodopi, 2014
- Olivier Barrot, «Les Mille Mots du citoyen Morille Marmouset», in Un livre, un jour, INA,31 janvier 2006 (View podcast)
- Astrid Eliard, «Les Mille Mots du citoyen Morille Marmouset», in Le Figaro, 18 février 2006 (Read)
- Claude Mourthé, «Le Théorème de Roitelet», in Le Magazine littéraire, décembre 2006 (Read)
- Anne Logeay, « L'aigle et le phénix», in Historia, août 2008 (Read)
- Marianne Payot, « Les Mots à la guillotine », in L’Express, 12 janvier 2006 (Read)
- Marie-Hélène Fraïssé, «Un Enpereur bien gardé», in Tout un monde, France Culture, 4 mai 2008 (Read)
- Marie-Françoise Leclère, «La guerre de 14 en équations», in Le Point, 17 janvier 2007 (Read)
- Yves Bruley, «Les Mille Mots du citoyen Morille Marmouset», in Historia, avril 2006 (Read)
- Delphine Peras, «Le Lavoisier de la grammaire», in Lire et L’Express, 1 février 2006 (Read)
