= Alfredo Catalán =

Venezuelan politician (born 1968)

Alfredo Catalán Schick (born November 12, 1968), is a Venezuelan politician. He is affiliated with Project Venezuela. He was elected mayor of El Hatillo from July 30, 2000 until December 1, 2008. He was reelected once in 2004.

== Career as a mayor ==
In 2001 the mayor stated that his main goal for the municipality was to promote it as a touristic destination. In fact, Catalán's first year in office was focused on improving the appearance of the municipality, and the El Hatillo Independent Institute of Tourism and Recreation was created. Operation Joy (Spanish: Operación Alegría), a project that attempted to make the municipality cleaner and nicer, was in action during Catalán's government.

According to the municipality website, Catalán's government made improvements to the educational facilities of the area, including the repair of five state-owned schools that support 1,400 students. Special programs were implemented for students, such as drug prevention, water conservation, the Francisco de Miranda Project, which focused on the use of technology to improve children's education, and other programs that also benefited the municipality by getting citizens more involved in the community activities. As of 2008 public schools conditions are worse than they were before the arrival of Catalan into office. Also, crime and heavy traffic problems caused by an irresponsible residential policy implemented by Catalan are impacting negatively in a municipality that was once considered "the safest municipality of Caracas". Catalan's approval ratings dropped towards the end of his term and most of the inhabitants of El Hatillo blamed him for the problems of the municipality.

=== Criticism ===
Some individuals, such as the journalist Nelson Bocaranda, have criticized Catalán's administration regarding the municipality's insecurity. Bocaranda himself was a victim of death threats after criticizing Catalán's government in his radio emission Los Run Runes de Nelson. According to the IFEX, the mayor's father Norberto Catalán, went to Bocaranda's office in La Lagunita with his bodyguard. Bocaranda was not in his office at the time, but his secretary was told that Norberto was armed and he would shoot the journalist if he did not take his comments back within 24 hours. The mayor's father also left threatening notes. A security video camera recorded the incident.

Catalan dedicated his second term to the issuing of residential construction permits all over the municipality without stopping to consider how this would affect traffic in the municipality. There are few avenues and roads that connect El Hatillo to the rest of Caracas and, during Catalan's government, there was a substantial amount of new residential developments in the zone that have resulted in the collapse of El Hatillo infrastructure such as roads and public services.

=== Government bankruptcy ===
In 2001, Alfredo Catalán mentioned in several occasions that the municipality was bankrupted. He said to the media that a lot had been done for El Hatillo for a first year in office, and since the beginning of his first term, Catalán had given priority to tourism. Between the five municipalities of Caracas, El Hatillo receives the least income from taxes, but he believed that Operation Joy would give the residents trust in the mayor, and more investments have been done in culture and tourism than in a new local government headquarters for example. Catalán denounced that Flora Aranguren, the previous mayor, had left a deficit of almost US$500,000 between budget and treasury.
