= Nicolás Catalán =

Nicolás Catalán (1780 in Chilpancingo – 17 March 1838 in Chilpancingo) was a leader of the resistance in the Mexican War of Independence, active in the current state of Guerrero. He was promoted to the rank of general on 22 February 1823. He was married to Antonia Nava de Catalán.
