= Jean Cathala =

French singer (1645 – 1680)

Jean Cathala was a French singer, composer and cornettist, active in the years (1645 – 1680).

== Biography ==
His career began and ended in Paris, but also took place in Amiens and Auxerre.

=== Paris ===
A mention on 17 February 1646, followed by a reference on 28 May 1650, indicates that he was a clerk and a singer (middle register voice) in the Sainte Chapelle of the Palace and that he also played the cornett. As he appears also in the registers of Notre-Dame at such a time (employed at 16 sous per day according to an act of 2 July 1649, and in 1652).

=== Amiens ===
He then appeared as maître de chapelle of the Amiens Cathedral and, on 2 October 1656, the chapter of the cathedral conferred on him the vicarial chapel of Saint-Quentin, which before him had been given to Jean Patte, then Valentin de Bournonville. He resigned from his post of Amiens on 13 November 1658, probably because of a disagreement with the Chapter, and the Chapter instructed him a few days later to vacate the position before the next Saint-André (30 November). His successor was François Cosset, like him, a composer of masses.

=== Auxerre ===
In Auxerre, Cathala succeeded Annibal Gantez as maître de chapelle of the Cathedral. He was there in August 1663, when he gave the chapter of the Troyes Cathedral a copy of his mass Inclina cor meum in recognition of the donation to him made by the chapter for playing the cornett at the feast of St. Peter at the Troyes Cathedral.:

A esté agréé une messe en musicque composée par Maistre Jean Cathala Maistre de musicque en l'Eglise d'Auxerre et excellant joueur de cornet à bouquin intitulée Inclina cor meum deus, présentée de sa part en recognoissance du don qui lui fust faict par ce chapitre le trente juin dernier à cause de son assistance à la feste de Sainct Pierre à laquelle il joua dudict cornet. Laquelle messe a esté remise es mains de Me Jacques Michel Maistre de musique de ceste eglise pour la faire chanter au premier jour.

=== Paris ===
Cathala seems to have returned to Paris on an unknown date: probably he was the "Cathalas", an ordinary singer of the Paris church, who attended the funeral of Louis Gingart's son, ordinary musician of the king and queen, on 27 February 1673, and who resided in the Rue des Marmousets-en-la-Cité (La Madeleine parish). On 31 December 1679, he is said to be teaching music in Paris while witnessing the wedding of an officer of the archbishop of Paris.

== Works ==
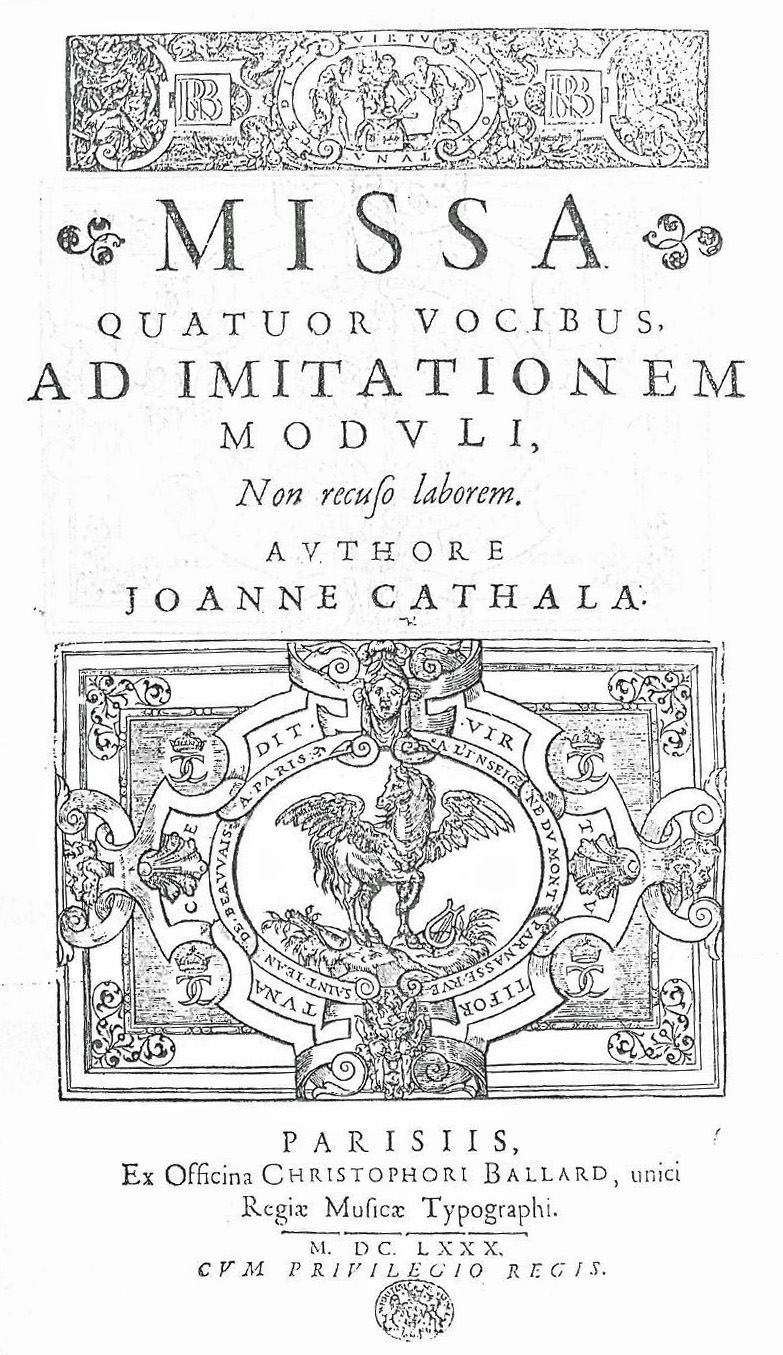
Title page of the Non recuso laborem mass by Jean Cathala (Paris: 1680). (c) London BL.

Cathala's only known works are seven Masses, all published in Paris by Robert III Ballard, then Christophe Ballard. Only two of them were found. Their writing is interesting, with quite developed melodies and a rather elaborate counterpoint: Cathala can be considered as one of the composers of the most interesting masses of his period.

- Missa Inclina cor meum Deus, 4 v. Paris : Robert III Ballard, 1663 or end of 1662. Guillo 2003 n° 1663-F.

This is a lost edition, the existence of which is revealed by the chapter records of the cathedral church of Troyes.
The second edition was published by Christophe Ballard in 1678 but was also lost. It is revealed by the catalogues of the Ballard company and Sébastien de Brossard's notes.

- Missa Laetare Jerusalem, 5 v. Paris: Robert III Ballard, 1666. Guillo 2003 n° 1666-H.

Lost edition, whose existence is revealed by Sébastien de Brossard's notes and Ballard's catalogues.

- Missa In luce stellarum, 5 v. Paris: Robert III Ballard, 1670. Guillo 2003 n° 1670-B.

Lost edition, whose existence is revealed by Sébastien de Brossard's notes and Ballard's catalogues..

- Missa Ecce quam bonum, 4 v. Paris : Robert III Ballard, c. 1660-1670 ? Guillo 2003 n° ND-23.

Lost edition, the existence of which is revealed by Ballard's catalogues. It could also have appeared at the beginning of Christophe Ballard's career.

- Missa Nigra sum, sed formosa, 5 v. Paris: Christophe Ballard, 1678. 2°, 20 f. RISM C 1522.

This Mass is entirely composed (and printed) in black notes, alluding to its title (taken from the beginning of the Song of Songs).

- Missa Non recuso laborem, 4 v. Paris: Christophe Ballard, 1680. 2°, 18 f. RISM C 1523.
- Missa sillabica pleno-cantu quatuor vocum ad imitationem moduli. Paris: Christophe Ballard, 1683.

A lost edition, known by Sébastien de Brossard's notes and Ballard's catalogues.

== Sources ==
- Michel Brenet (pseud. of Marie Bobillier). Les musiciens de la Sainte-Chapelle du Palais : documents inédits, recueillis et annotés par Michel Brenet. Paris : A. Picard, 1910. read on IMSLP.
- Yolande de Brossard. Musiciens de Paris 1535-1792 d’après le fichier Laborde. Paris : Picard, 1965.
- Aimé Cherest, Notice sur les musiciens qui ont illustré le departement de l'Yonne, Bulletin de la Société des sciences historiques et naturelles de l'Yonne 4 (1850), p. 29–53. read on Gallica, see p. 43-44.
- Georges Durand, La musique de la cathédrale d'Amiens avant la Révolution, Bulletin trimestriel de la Société des antiquaires de Picardie (1922), p. 329–457; repr. in La vie musicale dans les provinces françaises, I (Geneva, 1972).
- Françoise Gaussen, Actes d'état-civil de musiciens français 1651–1681, Recherches sur la Musique Française Classique 1 (1960), p. 153–203.
- Laurent Guillo, Pierre I Ballard et Robert III Ballard, imprimeurs du roy pour la musique (1599-1673). Sprimont and Versailles: 2003. 2 vol.
- William Hays, "Cathala, Jean - composer, singer, cornettist", Grove’s Dictionary online, read online.
- Arthur Émile Prévost. Instruments de musique usitéz dans nos églises depuis le trezième siècle, Mémoires de la Société d'agriculture, des sciences, arts et belles-lettres du département de l'Aube 68 (1904), p. 43–223.
- Jean-Paul Montagnier, The Polyphonic Mass in France, 1600-1780: The Evidence of the Printed Choirbooks, Cambridge: Cambridge University Press, 2017.
