= Silvia Catalán =

Spanish photographer

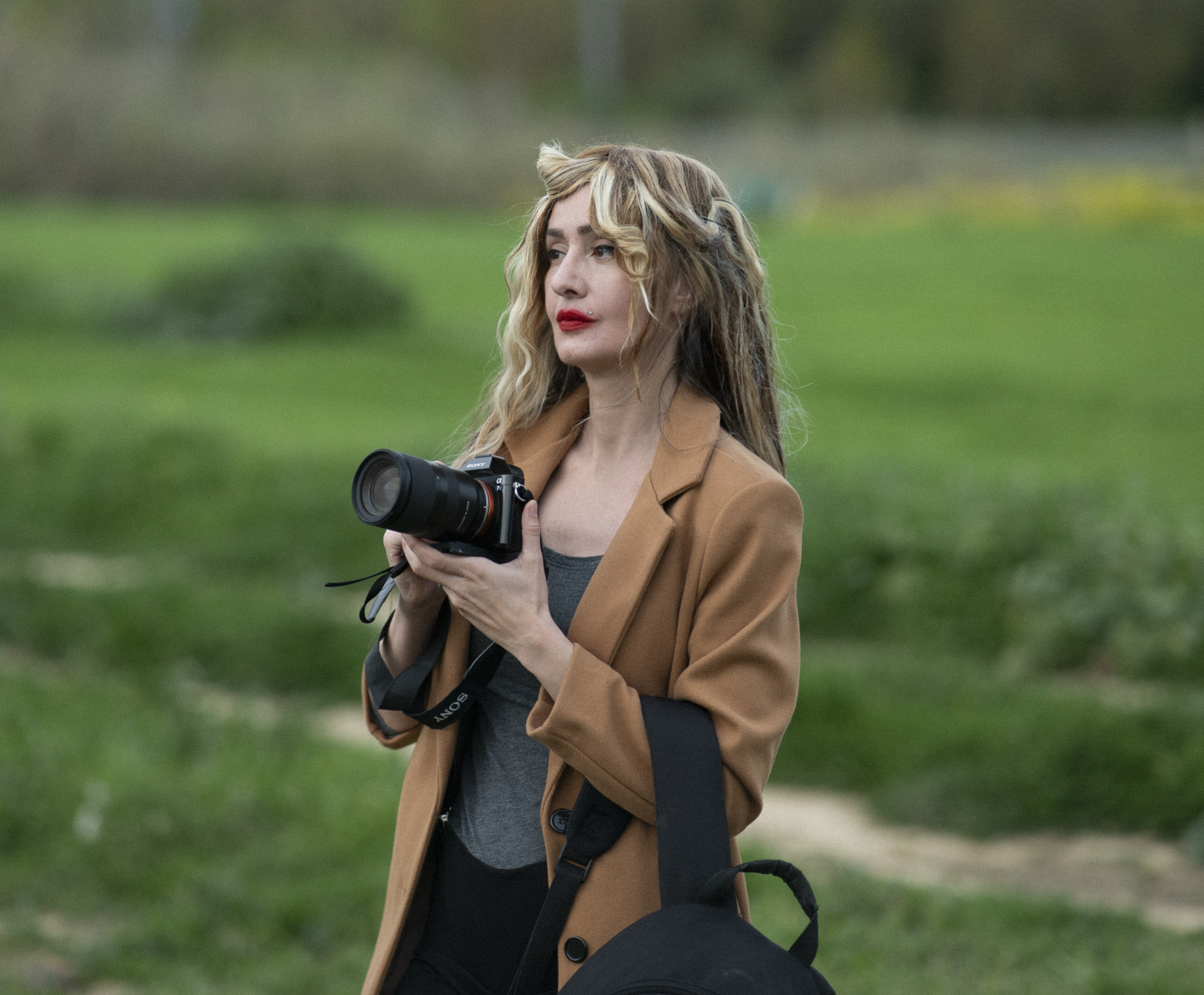
- Born: Pamplona
- Occupation: Photographer
- Movement: Fine art
- Website: https://www.silviacatalanphoto.com/

Silvia Catalán (Pamplona, Navarre) is a Spanish photographer specialising in fantasy or fine art photography. She has held several exhibitions and portrayed celebrities from the world of show business. In 2023 she received the Navarre Government's award for recognition of self-employment in the category of artistic recreation.

== Professional development ==
She began her career in the modelling and beauty industry. Her chance to become a photographer came when she stood in for an absent photographer at a model shoot. After the shoot, she bought her first camera and started practicing both photography and editing on her own.

After the photo session, she adapts the images to a creative idea by editing them. She provides the setting, clothing and accessories that transform the original photograph. Her creations include fine art photography that reflects a dreamy and magical world, fashion photography for catalogues, magazines and advertisements, and creative advertising photography. She also photographed a number of other works, such as Carlos Baute, Manu Tenorio, Carlos Escobedo and Razkin. She has also photographed actor and comedian Alex O'Dogherty, actresses Laura Galán, Mari Cielo Pajares and Nerea Garmendia, Journalists Beatriz Solano, Maria Relaño, Miguel Temprano, Amaia Madinabeitia and Yohanna Alonso (world champion in martial art), etc.

Catalán has collaborated with other creative artists and her photographic work has been included in various exhibitions. She has exhibited her photographs at the XXXI Muestra Internacional de Zarauz, at the Centro Cultural Tafalla Kulturgunea in 2023, and at the Ayuntamiento de Ujué with the exhibition "Dark Romantic". She has been published in the international magazines Eclair, Fiji, and Fetén, as well as in the magazine "La Heavy", where she did the cover of the band Sôber.

Silvia Catalán was portrayed in the book "Antes de que llegaras" by Toni Sasal. She has collaborated with the Mexican singer Laura Arza and the French portraitist Aurelie Ferrara. She is also the photographer of Sôber's album.

She was awarded the Comunidad Foral de Navarra's Recognition in the category of "Artistic creations" in 2023.
