= Antonia Nava de Catalán =

Mexican revolutionary (1779–1843)

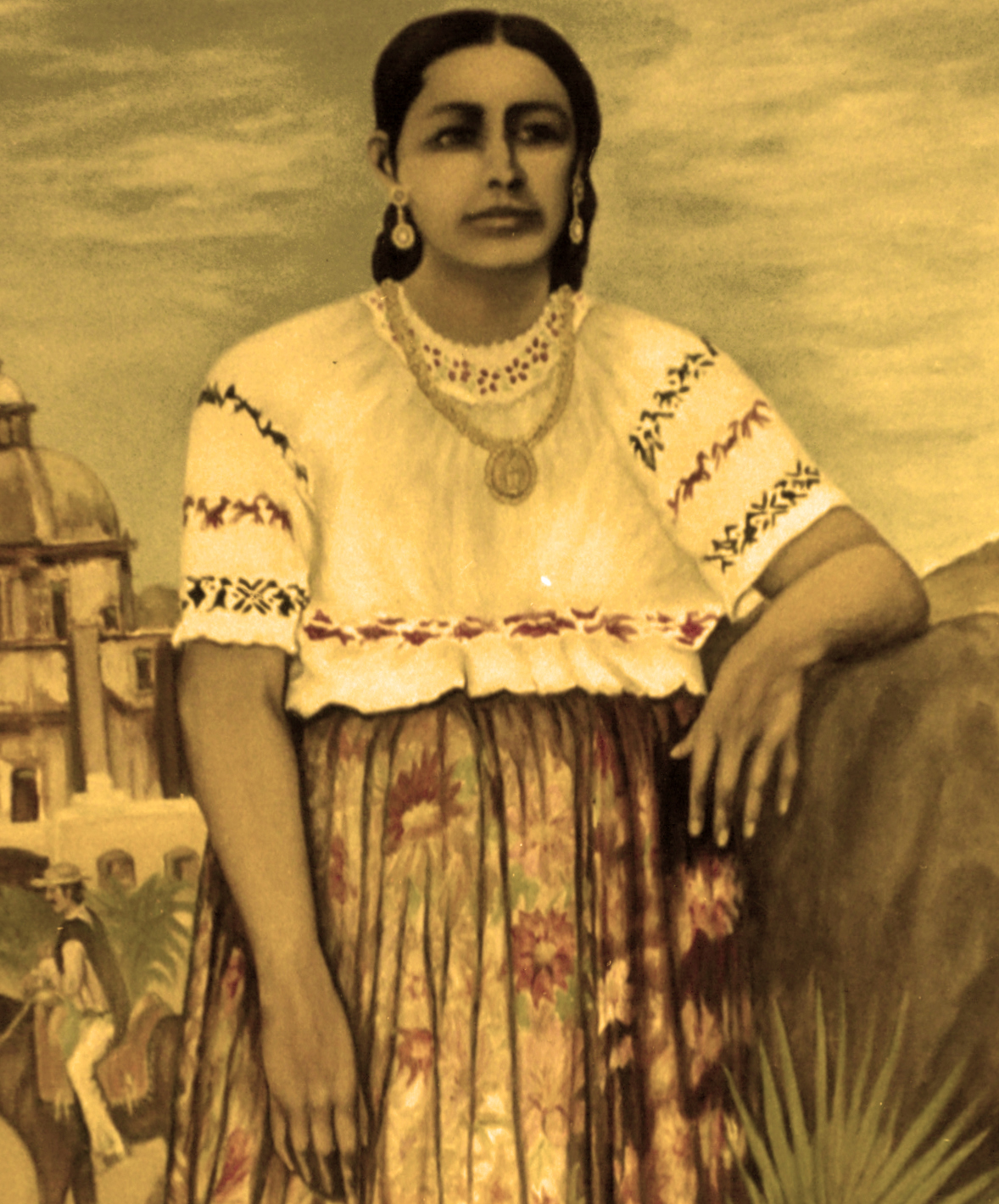
- Born: Antonia Nava Celestina; 17 November 1779; Tixtla, New Spain
- Died: 19 March 1843 (aged 63); Chilpancingo, Mexico
- Occupation: Freedom fighter
- Spouse: Nicolás Catalán

Antonia Nava de Catalán (née Nava Celestina; 17 November 1779 – 19 March 1843) was a woman involved in the Mexican War of Independence. She accompanied her husband, a volunteer who rose to the rank of colonel, throughout the war. Three of her sons were killed in the struggle. She is remembered for her willingness to sacrifice her family and herself to achieve independence from Spain, and came to be known as La Generala. She fought alongside José María Morelos until her death.

In more urban areas, women worked as servants or street vendors, selling from food to clothes. If these women were not in the market place, they were back in their homes doing domestic housework, as in cooking and cleaning. In Spain women who did this work were considered honorable, and if women were seen as homeless or "unworthy", they would be placed into homes in order to be re-educated or work as prostitutes. Women who fought in the war were battling against times of oppression brought on by Spaniards, but they also fought to help the soldiers who were usually loved ones.

== Early years (1779–1810) ==
Antonia Nava de Catalán was born in Tixtla on 17 November 1779. Her parents were Nicolás Nava and María Celestina. She married Nicolás Catalán, the oldest son of Nicolasa Catalán, born in Chilpancingo in 1780. They had five sons, Nicolás, Manuel, Antonio, Pedro and one whose name is unknown, and three daughters, Teresa, María and Margarita. After their marriage, they moved from Tixtla to Chilpancingo, where they settled for a short time, until Nicolás Catalán had an argument with his father, and then moved to Jaleaca. The family was living in Jaleaca when the war of independence broke out in September 1810. The war of independence put their marriage to the test until they found General José María Morelos, who gave them security as to what would be the outcomes of the war.

== Acapulco (1810–1811) ==
Nicolás Catalán joined General José María Morelos at the end of 1810. Antonia Nava accompanied him throughout the war. She persuaded many poor women to help the insurgents by acting as cooks and porters, and started a women's battalion. They found Morelos in the Cerro El Veladero mountains above Acapulco. Morelos had received orders from Miguel Hidalgo y Costilla to raise a rebellion in the south and take the port of Acapulco. On 4 January 1811 Morelos successfully attacked Tres Palos, taking many prisoners and much booty. Nicolás Catalán fought with distinction in this action. Nicolás Catalán became a corporal in February 1811.

On 8 February 1811 Morelos advanced on Acapulco. He thought the Spanish sergeant José Gago had agreed to give up the place for money, but Gago broke his word and when they reached the Fort of San Diego they came under heavy fire. Morelos retreated. He thought Nicolás Catalán, who was at the head of the column, had been killed, but later he showed up unharmed. One of the Catalán sons died in El Fortín in the port of Acapulco. It is said that Morelos called Antonia Nava to him so he could console her after her son had been killed by the royalists. She replied "I do not come to mourn. I do not regret the death of my son. I know he did his duty. I come to bring you my other four sons. Three can serve as soldiers and one, who is small, will be a drummer."

== Ongoing struggle (1811–1817) ==
After this, on 3 May 1811 the revolutionaries left for Chilpancingo, where Morelos prepared for the capture of Tixtla, which fell at noon on 26 May 1811. On 13 September 1813, to celebrate the Congress of Chilpancingo in which Mexico formally declared itself to be independent of Spain, Antonia Nava and María de Jesús de Nava prepared food for the revolutionaries and the people. By 1813 Nicolás Catalán was a captain. Their son Manuel Catalán died in Tixtla, in the Paso de Mezcala, on 21 January 1814. Nicolás Catalán was assigned to the command of Nicolás Bravo and in September 1816 was made Lieutenant Colonel. Along with other women, Gertrudis Bocanegra and Leona Vicario, who also fought during the Mexican War of Independence, Antonia Nava de Catalán, demonstrated that women were able to take part in combat rather than just do the traditional cooking, cleaning, and providing health care.

== Cerro del Campo (February 1817) ==
In February 1817 the army of General Nicolás Bravo and his lieutenant, Don Nicolás Catalán, took refuge in a strong point in the Cerro del Campo within sight of Jaleaca. They were surrounded by the royalist forces of José Gabriel de Armijo for 50 days and suffered unbearable hunger. They agreed to sacrifice one soldier out of every ten to serve as food for the troops. The women led by Antonia Nava, with her sister-in-law María Catalán and Catalina González, the wife of Nicolás Bautista, offered to sacrifice themselves. Catalina González offered herself as the first woman to be sacrificed instead. This was refused, but the offer had roused the fighting spirit of the revolutionaries. When asked what they should do, Antonia Nava said it was better to die fighting than to sacrifice themselves, it was 11:00 at night and the enemy was sleeping. She said, "Give us women weapons and together we will break the siege". The women armed themselves with machetes and clubs and went out to fight the enemy. They escaped on 14 March 1817. After this Antonia Nava was called "La Generala". A 1910 account of the incident ends with "Blessed are you, O Mexican land, in whose bosom such wonderful daughters sleep!".

== Later events (1817–43) ==
In November 1818 troops led by Pedro Ascencio and Antonia's son Nicolás Catalán, attacked Coyuca. Nicolás, a First Sergeant (Sargento primero), died in November 1818 at Coyuca, now called Coyuca de Catalán. In the last part of the war Nicolás Catalán senior was under Vicente Guerrero. He was promoted to colonel on 19 April 1820. Antonia and two of her children were present at the signing of the Plan of Iguala on 24 February 1821 and at the entrance of the Army of the Three Guarantees into Mexico City on 27 September 1821, riding next to her husband, Nicolás Catalán.

Nicolás Catalán was promoted to brigadier general in 1823, and on 24 January 1828 was made commander of the state of Guerrero. The family settled in Chilpancingo. Nicolás Catalán the elder died in 1838. Antonia Nava de Catalán died in Chilpancingo on 19 March 1843, aged 63. The three children she had lost during the struggle are considered young heroes by the people of Guerrero. Jaleaca became Jaleaca de Catalán by decree 15 of 3 June 1889.

== Impact on Soldaderas ==
After the Mexican War of Independence women were seen as indispensable and continued to contribute to the wars after the War of Independence, like the soldaderas that fought during the Mexican Revolution. Many male generals did not believe that women should be used in battle to the belief that they would be more useful in cooking and providing healthcare to their wounded male soldiers. The women helped keep many of the soldiers well and alive. The roles of women were less of fighting on the battlefield and more domestic work, even so, women were seen as one of the most important fighters of these battles. Antonia Nava de Catalán along with other women involved in the war was seen as a heroic figure that encouraged other women to join the war and bring courage to other soldiers throughout the years even during the Mexican Revolution.

== Public recognition ==
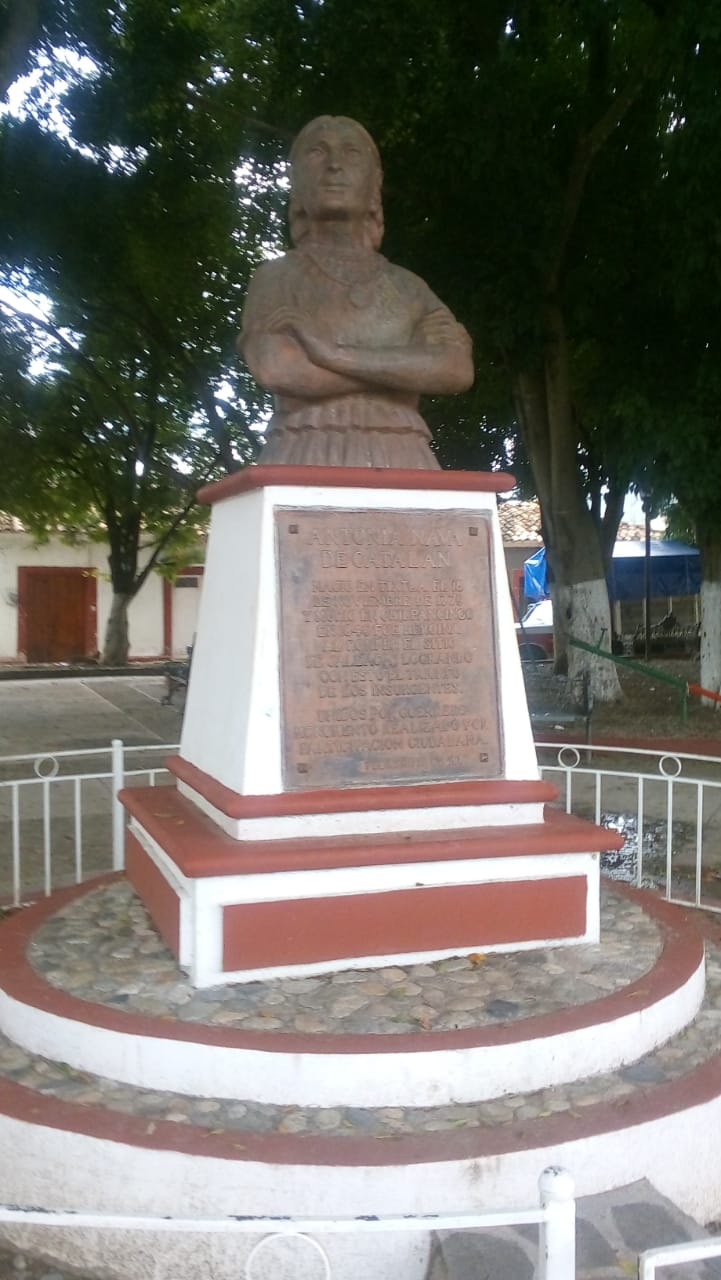
Statue of Antonia Nava de Catalán in Tixtla de Guerrero.

In honor of her heroism, Tixtla De Guerrero placed a statue of her on February 15, 1987. In the Municipal Presidency of Tixtla, there is a painting where she is seen holding her son in her arms. In Chilpancingo, the capital of Guerrero, three schools were named after her.

== Sources ==
- Acuña Cepeda, Mirtea Elizabeth (19 November 2017). "Antonia Nava de Catalán, la Generala". Ecos de la Costa (in Spanish). Archived from the original on 1 December 2017.
- Baltazar, María (16 September 2013). "Las Mujeres en el Movimiento de Independencia". Origen (in Spanish).
- JSA/JOSR. Nava de Catalán, Antonia (in Spanish). Guerrero Cultural Siglo XXI.
- Robinson, Barry M (2010). "La Reclusión de Mujeres Rebeldes: El Recogimiento en la Guerra de Independencia Mexicana, 1810-1819" (PDF). redalyc.org.
- Salas, Elizabeth (2010-07-04). Soldaderas in the Mexican Military: Myth and History. University of Texas Press. ISBN 978-0-292-78766-7.
- Stern, Steve J. (1997). The Secret History of Gender: Women, Men, and Power in Late Colonial Mexico. University of North Carolina Press.
- Wright de Kleinhans, Laureana (1910). "Doña Antonía Nava de Catalán heroína de la índependencía 1781 (?) - 1822 (?)". Mujeres notables mexicanas (PDF) (in Spanish). México: Tipografía Económica.
- Salas, Elizabeth (1987). Soldaderas in the Mexican military. University of Texas Press.
