= Cahillane =

Cahillane is a surname. Notable people with the surname include:

- Paul Cahillane (born 1989), Irish Gaelic footballer
- Steve Cahillane (born 1965), American business executive
