= ISO 639:n =

List of ISO 639-3 language codes starting with N

This is a list of ISO 639-3 language codes starting with N.

Index | a | b | c | d | e | f | g | h | i | j | k | l | m | n | o | p | q | r | s | t | u | v | w | x | y | z

Abbreviations are used in the table as follows:

- Scope: I = individual language, M = macrolanguage, S = special code
- Type: C = constructed, E = extinct (in recent times), H = historical (distinct from its modern form), L = living, S = special code

Deprecated codes are enclosed in (parentheses).

The column Family contains the generic English name of the language's family or macrolanguage.

ISO 639 codes			Scope/Type	Family	Language names	
639-3	639-1	639-2/B	Scope/Type	Family	Native	ISO name
naa			I/L			Namla
nab			I/L			Southern Nambikuára
nac			I/L			Narak
(nad)			I/L			Nijadali
nae			I/E			Naka'ela
naf			I/L			Nabak
nag			I/L			Naga Pidgin
naj			I/L			Nalu
nak			I/L			Nakanai
nal			I/L			Nalik
nam			I/L			Ngan'gityemerri
nan			I/L	Sino-Tibetan	閩南語/闽南语	Min Nan Chinese
nao			I/L			Naaba
nap		nap	I/L		nnapulitano	Neapolitan
naq			I/L		Khoekhoegowab	Khoekhoe; Nama (Namibia)
nar			I/L			Iguta
nas			I/L			Naasioi
nat			I/L			Ca̱hungwa̱rya̱; Hungworo
nau	na	nau	I/L	Austronesian	ekakairũ naoero	Nauru
nav	nv	nav	I/L	Dené–Yeniseian	Diné bizaad	Navaho; Navajo
naw			I/L			Nawuri
nax			I/L			Nakwi
nay			I/E			Ngarrindjeri
naz			I/L			Coatepec Nahuatl
nba			I/L			Nyemba
nbb			I/L			Ndoe
nbc			I/L			Chang Naga
nbd			I/L			Ngbinda
nbe			I/L			Konyak Naga
(nbf)			I/L			Naxi
nbg			I/L	Dravidian?		Nagarchal
nbh			I/L			Ngamo
nbi			I/L			Mao Naga
nbj			I/L			Ngarinyman
nbk			I/L			Nake
nbl	nr	nbl	I/L	Niger–Congo	Ndébélé	South Ndebele
nbm			I/L			Ngbaka Ma'bo
nbn			I/L			Kuri
nbo			I/L			Nkukoli
nbp			I/L			Nnam
nbq			I/L			Nggem
nbr			I/L			Numana
nbs			I/L			Namibian Sign Language
nbt			I/L	Sino-Tibetan	Bangni	Na
nbu			I/L			Rongmei Naga
nbv			I/L			Ngamambo
nbw			I/L			Southern Ngbandi
(nbx)			I/E	Pama–Nyungan, Karnic, Maric		Ngura
nby			I/L			Ningera
nca			I/L			Iyo
ncb			I/L			Central Nicobarese
ncc			I/L			Ponam
ncd			I/L			Nachering
nce			I/L			Yale
ncf			I/L			Notsi
ncg			I/L		Nisǥa’a	Nisga'a
nch			I/L			Central Huasteca Nahuatl
nci			I/H			Classical Nahuatl
ncj			I/L			Northern Puebla Nahuatl
nck			I/L			Na-kara
ncl			I/L			Michoacán Nahuatl
ncm			I/L			Nambo
ncn			I/L			Nauna
nco			I/L			Sibe
(ncp)			I/L			Ndaktup
ncq			I/L	Austroasiatic		Northern Katang
ncr			I/L			Ncane
ncs			I/L			Nicaraguan Sign Language
nct			I/L			Chothe Naga
ncu			I/L			Chumburung
ncx			I/L			Central Puebla Nahuatl
ncz			I/E			Natchez
nda			I/L			Ndasa
ndb			I/L			Kenswei Nsei
ndc			I/L			Ndau
ndd			I/L			Nde-Nsele-Nta
nde	nd	nde	I/L	Niger–Congo	isiNdebele	North Ndebele
ndf			I/H			Nadruvian
ndg			I/L			Ndengereko
ndh			I/L			Ndali
ndi			I/L			Samba Leko
ndj			I/L			Ndamba
ndk			I/L			Ndaka
ndl			I/L			Ndolo
ndm			I/L			Ndam
ndn			I/L			Ngundi
ndo	ng	ndo	I/L	Niger–Congo	O(shi)wambo	Ndonga
ndp			I/L			Ndo
ndq			I/L			Ndombe
ndr			I/L			Ndoola
nds		nds	I/L		Plattdüütsch; Neddersass'sch	Low German; Low Saxon
ndt			I/L			Ndunga
ndu			I/L			Dugun
ndv			I/L			Ndut
ndw			I/L			Ndobo
ndx			I/L			Nduga
ndy			I/L			Lutos
ndz			I/L			Ndogo
nea			I/L			Eastern Ngad'a
neb			I/L			Toura (Côte d'Ivoire)
nec			I/L			Nedebang
ned			I/L			Nde-Gbite
nee			I/L			Nêlêmwa-Nixumwak
nef			I/L			Nefamese
neg			I/L			Negidal
neh			I/L			Nyenkha
nei			I/H			Neo-Hittite
nej			I/L			Neko
nek			I/L			Neku
nem			I/L			Nemi
nen			I/L			Nengone
neo			I/L			Ná-Meo
nep	ne	nep	M/L	Indo-European	नेपाली	Nepali (macrolanguage)
neq			I/L			North Central Mixe
ner			I/L			Yahadian
nes			I/L			Bhoti Kinnauri
net			I/L	Engan	Nete	Nete
neu			I/C			Neo
nev			I/L			Nyaheun
new		new	I/L	Sino-Tibetan	नेपाल भाषा	Nepal Bhasa; Newar; Newari
nex			I/L			Neme
ney			I/L			Neyo
nez			I/L			Nez Perce
nfa			I/L			Dhao
nfd			I/L			Ahwai
(nfg)			I/L			Nyeng
(nfk)			I/L			Shakara
nfl			I/L			Äiwoo; Ayiwo
nfr			I/L			Nafaanra
nfu			I/L			Mfumte
nga			I/L			Ngbaka
ngb			I/L			Northern Ngbandi
ngc			I/L			Ngombe (Democratic Republic of Congo)
ngd			I/L			Ngando (Central African Republic)
nge			I/L			Ngemba
ngg			I/L			Ngbaka Manza
ngh			I/L			Nǁng
ngi			I/L			Ngizim
ngj			I/L			Ngie
ngk			I/L			Dalabon
ngl			I/L			Lomwe
ngm			I/L			Ngatik Men's Creole
ngn			I/L			Ngwo
(ngo)			I/L			Ngoni
ngp			I/L			Ngulu
ngq			I/L			Ngoreme; Ngurimi
ngr			I/L			Engdewu
ngs			I/L			Gvoko
ngt			I/L	Austroasiatic		Kriang; Ngeq
ngu			I/L			Guerrero Nahuatl
ngv			I/E			Nagumi
ngw			I/L			Ngwaba
ngx			I/L			Nggwahyi
ngy			I/L			Tibea
ngz			I/L			Ngungwel
nha			I/L	Pama–Nyungan	Nanda	Nhanda
nhb			I/L			Beng
nhc			I/E			Tabasco Nahuatl
nhd			I/L			Ava Guaraní; Chiripá
nhe			I/L			Eastern Huasteca Nahuatl
nhf			I/L			Nhuwala
nhg			I/L			Tetelcingo Nahuatl
nhh			I/L			Nahari
nhi			I/L	Uto-Aztecan		Zacatlán-Ahuacatlán-Tepetzintla Nahuatl
(nhj)			I/L			Tlalitzlipa Nahuatl
nhk			I/L			Isthmus-Cosoleacaque Nahuatl
nhm			I/L			Morelos Nahuatl
nhn			I/L			Central Nahuatl
nho			I/L			Takuu
nhp			I/L			Isthmus-Pajapan Nahuatl
nhq			I/L	Uto-Aztecan		Huaxcaleca Nahuatl
nhr			I/L			Naro
(nhs)			I/L			Southeastern Puebla Nahuatl
nht			I/L			Ometepec Nahuatl
nhu			I/L			Noone
nhv			I/L			Temascaltepec Nahuatl
nhw			I/L			Western Huasteca Nahuatl
nhx			I/L			Isthmus-Mecayapan Nahuatl
nhy			I/L	Uto-Aztecan		Northern Oaxaca Nahuatl
nhz			I/L	Uto-Aztecan		Santa María La Alta Nahuatl
nia		nia	I/L			Nias
nib			I/L			Nakame
nid			I/E			Ngandi
nie			I/L			Niellim
nif			I/L			Nek
nig			I/E			Ngalakgan
nih			I/L			Nyiha (Tanzania)
nii			I/L			Nii
nij			I/L			Ngaju
nik			I/L			Southern Nicobarese
nil			I/L			Nila
nim			I/L			Nilamba
nin			I/L			Ninzo
nio			I/L		нганасаны	Nganasan
niq			I/L			Nandi
nir			I/L			Nimboran
nis			I/L			Nimi
nit			I/L			Southeastern Kolami
niu		niu	I/L		ko e vagahau Niuē	Niuean
niv			I/L		нивхгу	Gilyak
niw			I/L			Nimo
nix			I/L			Hema
niy			I/L			Ngiti
niz			I/L			Ningil
nja			I/L			Nzanyi
njb			I/L	Naga		Nocte Naga
njd			I/L			Ndonde Hamba
njh			I/L	Naga		Lotha Naga
nji			I/L			Gudanji
njj			I/L			Njen
njl			I/L			Njalgulgule
njm			I/L	Naga		Angami Naga
njn			I/L	Naga		Liangmai Naga
njo			I/L	Naga		Ao Naga
njr			I/L			Njerep
njs			I/L			Nisa
njt			I/L			Ndyuka-Trio Pidgin
nju			I/L			Ngadjunmaya
njx			I/L			Kunyi
njy			I/L			Njyem
njz			I/L			Nyishi
nka			I/L			Nkoya
nkb			I/L			Khoibu Naga
nkc			I/L			Nkongho
nkd			I/L			Koireng
nke			I/L			Duke
nkf			I/L			Inpui Naga
nkg			I/L			Nekgini
nkh			I/L			Khezha Naga
nki			I/L			Thangal Naga
nkj			I/L			Nakai
nkk			I/L			Nokuku
nkm			I/L			Namat
nkn			I/L			Nkangala
nko			I/L			Nkonya
nkp			I/E			Niuatoputapu
nkq			I/L			Nkami
nkr			I/L			Nukuoro
nks			I/L			North Asmat
nkt			I/L			Nyika (Tanzania)
nku			I/L			Bouna Kulango
nkv			I/L			Nyika (Malawi and Zambia)
nkw			I/L			Nkutu
nkx			I/L			Nkoroo
(nky)			I/L			Khiamniungan Naga
nkz			I/L			Nkari
nla			I/L			Ngombale
nlc			I/L			Nalca
nld	nl	dut	I/L	Indo-European	Nederlands	Dutch; Flemish
nle			I/L			East Nyala
nlg			I/L			Gela
nli			I/L			Grangali
nlj			I/L			Nyali
nlk			I/L			Ninia Yali
nll			I/L			Nihali
nlm			I/L	Indo-European		Mankiyali
(nln)			I/L			Durango Nahuatl
nlo			I/L			Ngul
nlq			I/L			Lao Naga
(nlr)			I/L			Ngarla
nlu			I/L			Nchumbulu
nlv			I/L	Uto-Aztecan		Orizaba Nahuatl
nlw			I/E			Walangama
nlx			I/L			Nahali
nly			I/L			Nyamal
nlz			I/L			Nalögo
nma			I/L			Maram Naga
nmb			I/L			Big Nambas; V'ënen Taut
nmc			I/L			Ngam
nmd			I/L			Ndumu
nme			I/L			Mzieme Naga
nmf			I/L			Tangkhul Naga (India)
nmg			I/L			Kwasio
nmh			I/L			Monsang Naga
nmi			I/L			Nyam
nmj			I/L			Ngombe (Central African Republic)
nmk			I/L			Namakura
nml			I/L			Ndemli
nmm			I/L			Manangba
nmn			I/L			ǃXóõ
nmo			I/L			Moyon Naga
nmp			I/E			Nimanbur
nmq			I/L			Nambya
nmr			I/E			Nimbari
nms			I/L			Letemboi
nmt			I/L			Namonuito
nmu			I/L			Northeast Maidu
nmv			I/E			Ngamini
nmw			I/L			Nimoa; Rifao
nmx			I/L			Nama (Papua New Guinea)
nmy			I/L			Namuyi
nmz			I/L			Nawdm
nna			I/L			Nyangumarta
nnb			I/L			Nande
nnc			I/L			Nancere
nnd			I/L			West Ambae
nne			I/L			Ngandyera
nnf			I/L			Ngaing
nng			I/L			Maring Naga
nnh			I/L			Ngiemboon
nni			I/L			North Nuaulu
nnj			I/L			Nyangatom
nnk			I/L			Nankina
nnl			I/L			Northern Rengma Naga
nnm			I/L			Namia
nnn			I/L			Ngete
nno	nn	nno	I/L	Indo-European	Nynorsk	Norwegian Nynorsk
nnp			I/L			Wancho Naga
nnq			I/L			Ngindo
nnr			I/E			Narungga
(nns)			I/L			Ningye
nnt			I/E			Nanticoke
nnu			I/L			Dwang
nnv			I/E			Nugunu (Australia)
nnw			I/L			Southern Nuni
(nnx)			I/L			Ngong
nny			I/E			Nyangga
nnz			I/L			Nda'nda'
noa			I/L			Woun Meu
nob	nb	nob	I/L	Indo-European	Bokmål	Norwegian Bokmål
noc			I/L			Nuk
nod			I/L		ล้านนา	Northern Thai
noe			I/L			Nimadi
nof			I/L			Nomane
nog		nog	I/L		Ногай	Nogai
noh			I/L			Nomu
noi			I/L			Noiri
noj			I/L			Nonuya
nok			I/E	Salish	Lhéchelesem	Nooksack
nol			I/E			Nomlaki
(nom)			I/E			Nocamán
non		non	I/H	Indo-European	norrǿna	Old Norse
(noo)			I/L		Nuučaan̓uł	Nootka
nop			I/L			Numanggang
noq			I/L			Ngongo
nor	no	nor	M/L	Indo-European	norsk	Norwegian
nos			I/L			Eastern Nisu
not			I/L			Nomatsiguenga
nou			I/L			Ewage-Notu
nov			I/C		novial	Novial
now			I/L			Nyambo
noy			I/L			Noy
noz			I/L			Nayi
npa			I/L			Nar Phu
npb			I/L			Nupbikha
npg			I/L			Ponyo-Gongwang Naga
nph			I/L			Phom Naga
npi			I/L			Nepali (individual language)
npl			I/L	Uto-Aztecan	nawatlajtole	Southeastern Puebla Nahuatl
npn			I/L			Mondropolon
npo			I/L			Pochuri Naga
nps			I/L			Nipsan
npu			I/L			Puimei Naga
npx			I/L	Austronesian		Noipx
npy			I/L			Napu
nqg			I/L			Southern Nago
nqk			I/L			Kura Ede Nago
nql			I/L	Niger–Congo		Ngendelengo
nqm			I/L			Ndom
nqn			I/L			Nen
nqo		nqo	I/L	Niger–Congo	ߒߞߏ	N'Ko
nqq			I/L			Kyan-Karyaw Naga
nqt			I/L	Afro-Asiatic		Nteng
nqy			I/L			Akyaung Ari Naga
nra			I/L			Ngom
nrb			I/L			Nara
nrc			I/H			Noric
nre			I/L			Southern Rengma Naga
nrf			I/L	Indo-European		Guernésiais; Jèrriais
nrg			I/L			Narango
nri			I/L			Chokri Naga
nrk			I/L			Ngarla
nrl			I/L			Ngarluma
nrm			I/L			Narom
nrn			I/E			Norn
nrp			I/H	unclassified		North Picene
nrr			I/E			Nora; Norra
nrt			I/E			Northern Kalapuya
nru			I/L	Sino-Tibetan		Narua
nrx			I/E			Ngurmbur
nrz			I/L			Lala
nsa			I/L			Sangtam Naga
nsb			I/E			Lower Nossob
nsc			I/L			Nshi
nsd			I/L			Southern Nisu
nse			I/L			Nsenga
nsf			I/L			Northwestern Nisu
nsg			I/L			Ngasa
nsh			I/L			Ngoshie
nsi			I/L			Nigerian Sign Language
nsk			I/L		ᓇᔅᑲᐱ	Naskapi
nsl			I/L			Norwegian Sign Language
nsm			I/L			Sumi Naga
nsn			I/L			Nehan
nso		nso	I/L		sePêdi	Northern Sotho; Pedi; Sepedi
nsp			I/L			Nepalese Sign Language
nsq			I/L			Northern Sierra Miwok
nsr			I/L			Maritime Sign Language
nss			I/L			Nali
nst			I/L			Tase Naga
nsu			I/L	Uto-Aztecan		Sierra Negra Nahuatl
nsv			I/L			Southwestern Nisu
nsw			I/L			Navut
nsx			I/L			Nsongo
nsy			I/L			Nasal
nsz			I/L			Nisenan
ntd			I/L	Austronesian		Northern Tidung
(nte)			I/L			Nathembo
ntg			I/E			Ngantangarra
nti			I/L			Natioro
ntj			I/L			Ngaanyatjarra
ntk			I/L			Ikoma-Nata-Isenye
ntm			I/L			Nateni
nto			I/L			Ntomba
ntp			I/L			Northern Tepehuan
ntr			I/L			Delo
(nts)			I/E			Natagaimas
ntu			I/L			Natügu
ntw			I/E			Nottoway
ntx			I/L			Tangkhul Naga (Myanmar)
nty			I/L			Mantsi
ntz			I/L			Natanzi
nua			I/L			Yuanga
nuc			I/E			Nukuini
nud			I/L			Ngala
nue			I/L			Ngundu
nuf			I/L	Sino-Tibetan		Nusu
nug			I/E			Nungali
nuh			I/L			Ndunda
nui			I/L			Ngumbi
nuj			I/L			Nyole
nuk			I/L			Nuuchahnulth; Nuu-chah-nulth
nul			I/E			Nusa Laut
num			I/L			Niuafo'ou
nun			I/L	Sino-Tibetan		Anong
nuo			I/L			Nguôn
nup			I/L			Nupe-Nupe-Tako
nuq			I/L			Nukumanu
nur			I/L			Nukuria
nus			I/L			Nuer
nut			I/L			Nung (Viet Nam)
nuu			I/L			Ngbundu
nuv			I/L			Northern Nuni
nuw			I/L			Nguluwan
nux			I/L			Mehek
nuy			I/L			Nunggubuyu
nuz			I/L			Tlamacazapa Nahuatl
nvh			I/L			Nasarian
nvm			I/L			Namiae
nvo			I/L			Nyokon
nwa			I/E			Nawathinehena
nwb			I/L			Nyabwa
nwc		nwc	I/H	Sino-Tibetan	पुलाङु नेपाल भास	Classical Nepal Bhasa; Classical Newari; Old Newari
nwe			I/L			Ngwe
nwg			I/E			Ngayawung
nwi			I/L			Southwest Tanna
nwm			I/L			Nyamusa-Molo
nwo			I/E	Pama–Nyungan		Nauo
nwr			I/L			Nawaru
nww			I/L	Niger–Congo		Ndwewe
nwx			I/H	Sino-Tibetan		Middle Newar
nwy			I/E			Nottoway-Meherrin
nxa			I/L			Nauete
nxd			I/L			Ngando (Democratic Republic of Congo)
nxe			I/L			Nage
nxg			I/L			Ngad'a
nxi			I/L			Nindi
(nxj)			I/L			Nyadu
nxk			I/L			Koki Naga
nxl			I/L			South Nuaulu
nxm			I/H			Numidian
nxn			I/E			Ngawun
nxo			I/L	Niger–Congo		Ndambomo
nxq			I/L	Sino-Tibetan	Naqxi geezheeq	Naxi
nxr			I/L			Ninggerum
(nxu)			I/E			Narau
nxx			I/L			Nafri
nya	ny	nya	I/L	Niger–Congo?	chiCheŵa	Chichewa; Chewa; Nyanja
nyb			I/L			Nyangbo
nyc			I/L			Nyanga-li
nyd			I/L			Nyore; Olunyole
nye			I/L			Nyengo
nyf			I/L			Giryama; Kigiryama
nyg			I/L			Nyindu
nyh			I/L			Nyikina
nyi			I/L			Ama (Sudan)
nyj			I/L			Nyanga
nyk			I/L			Nyaneka
nyl			I/L			Nyeu
nym		nym	I/L		Kinyamwezi	Nyamwezi
nyn		nyn	I/L			Nyankole
nyo		nyo	I/L		Orunyoro	Nyoro
nyp			I/E			Nyang'i
nyq			I/L			Nayini
nyr			I/L			Nyiha (Malawi)
nys			I/L	Pama–Nyungan	Noongar	Nyungar
nyt			I/E			Nyawaygi
nyu			I/L			Nyungwe
nyv			I/E			Nyulnyul
nyw			I/L			Nyaw
nyx			I/E			Nganyaywana
nyy			I/L			Nyakyusa-Ngonde
nza			I/L			Tigon Mbembe
nzb			I/L			Njebi
nzd			I/L	Niger–Congo		Nzadi
nzi		nzi	I/L			Nzima
nzk			I/L			Nzakara
nzm			I/L			Zeme Naga
nzr			I/L	Afro-Asiatic		Dir-Nyamzak-Mbarimi
nzs			I/L			New Zealand Sign Language
nzu			I/L			Teke-Nzikou
nzy			I/L			Nzakambay
nzz			I/L			Nanga Dama Dogon

== Sources ==
- "ISO 639-2 Registration Authority". Library of Congress.
- "ISO 639-3 Registration Authority". SIL International.
- Lewis, M. Paul; Simons, Gary F.; Fennig, Charles D., eds. (2016). "Ethnologue: Languages of the World" (19th ed.). Dallas, Texas: SIL International.
