= Southern Coahuila Nahuatl =

Dialect of Nahuatl spoken in northeast Mexico

- Native to: Mexico
- Region: Coahuila, Nuevo Leon
- Extinct: 20th century
- Language family: Uto-Aztecan: Aztecan (Nahuan); Nahuatl; Central Nahuatl; Nuclear; Southern Coahuila Nahuatl

Language codes
- ISO 639-3: –
- Glottolog: None

Southern Coahuila Nahuatl, or Neotlaxcaltec Nahuatl, is a variety of Nahuatl that was spoken in the northeast of Mexico, mainly in the municipalities of San Esteban and Parras de la Fuente in Coahuila, and Guadalupe and Bustamante in Nuevo León. A related variety was spoken in the west and central-north zones of the country, in the municipalities of Mexquitic, Teúl, Lagos de Moreno and Colotlán.

During the colonial era, the Tlaxcaltec colonization of the northeast of New Spain led to the foundation of new settlements and cities. San Esteban de Nueva Tlaxcala, in the south of Coahuila, was the most influential, and from here families of Tlaxcaltec colonists dispersed to found new cities like San Miguel de Aguayo (today Bustamante, Nuevo León), San Francisco de Coahuila (today Monclova, Coahuila) and Santa María de las Parras (today Parras de la Fuente, Coahuila). The latter, in turn, was a point of dispersion for families to found Viesca.

This northern variety, derived from 16th-century Tlaxcala Nahuatl, developed certain innovations which can be observed in documents written in it, primarily proceeding from the south of Coahuila and the north of Nuevo León, as the region was essentially devoid of other Nahua settlements. There is a short vocabulary list of this variety, which was published in the 20th century.

== History ==
There is an extensive record of documents written in this variety of Nahuatl from the beginning of Nahua settlement in northern New Spain. Over the following centuries, Coahuila Nahuatl evolved independently from Tlaxcala Nahuatl.

The Neotlaxcaltecs were concerned with preserving their language, playing an important role as a symbol of their own identity, thus distinguishing them from the Spanish and the Chichimecas. Captain Alonso Pérez de León, in his Historia de Nuevo León written in the 17th century, documented that in the New Kingdom of León the teaching of Nahuatl and Spanish was promoted to the detriment of the other languages of the region. In the second half of the 18th century, the Neotlaxcaltecs explained to the viceroy of New Spain that they themselves gave the Christian doctrine in Nahuatl, claiming that the minister father on duty did not preach in their language.

The last stronghold of this variety of Nahuatl may have been Saltillo, Coahuila, until the mid-20th century. However, censuses from the last years of the 19th century indicated that the number of speakers was already very small. In the case of Nuevo León, its use is also documented until the end of the same century in at least two municipalities. In his 1897 book Nomenclatura geográfica de México, Antonio Peñafiel catalogued Coahuila Nahuatl as being in danger of extinction.

One of the last speakers of Nahuatl in Nueva Tlaxcala was Don Cesáreo Reyes, a native Nahuatl speaker from Saltillo who was interviewed in 1949 by the magazine Tlalocan. He explained the linguistic situation of his time and some reasons why the language fell into disuse, such as the imposition of the Spanish language in the schools of his community, since at that time, San Esteban de Nueva Tlaxcala had already been completely annexed to the city of Saltillo.

This variant of Nahuatl has greatly influenced the speech of Comarca Lagunera, where many words of Nahuatl origin remain in use in local Spanish, which are known as lagunerismos. In several municipalities of Nuevo León, words of Nahuatl origin are also preserved in the local language. Currently, a language revitalization project has been developed for the Neotlaxcaltec variant in the municipality of Bustamante, Nuevo León.

== Literature ==
Although they wrote a huge amount of legal documents in Nahuatl, little is known about the literature of the Neotlaxcalans. Only one short poem written in this variant is known, registered and published by the magazine Tlalocan and given by Don Cesáreo Reyes.

Onpa tsintlan tepetl
xochitl mowiwilana,
monextia se konetsintli
ke noyollo kitihtilana.

— Tlaxcaltec poetry of Saltillo

This translates as: There, under that mountain, a virgin appears, my heart calls her.

== See also ==
- Classical Nahuatl
- Huasteca Nahuatl
- Guerrero Nahuatl
- Orizaba Nahuatl
- Isthmus Nahuatl
- Tetelcingo Nahuatl
- Tabasco Nahuatl
- Tehuacan-Zongolica Nahuatl
- Sierra Puebla Nahuatl
- Michoacan Nahuatl
- Morelos Nahuatl
- Mexicanero language
- Classical Nahuatl grammar
- History of Nahuatl
