= Nahuan languages =

Uto-Aztecan language

Nahuan
- Aztecan
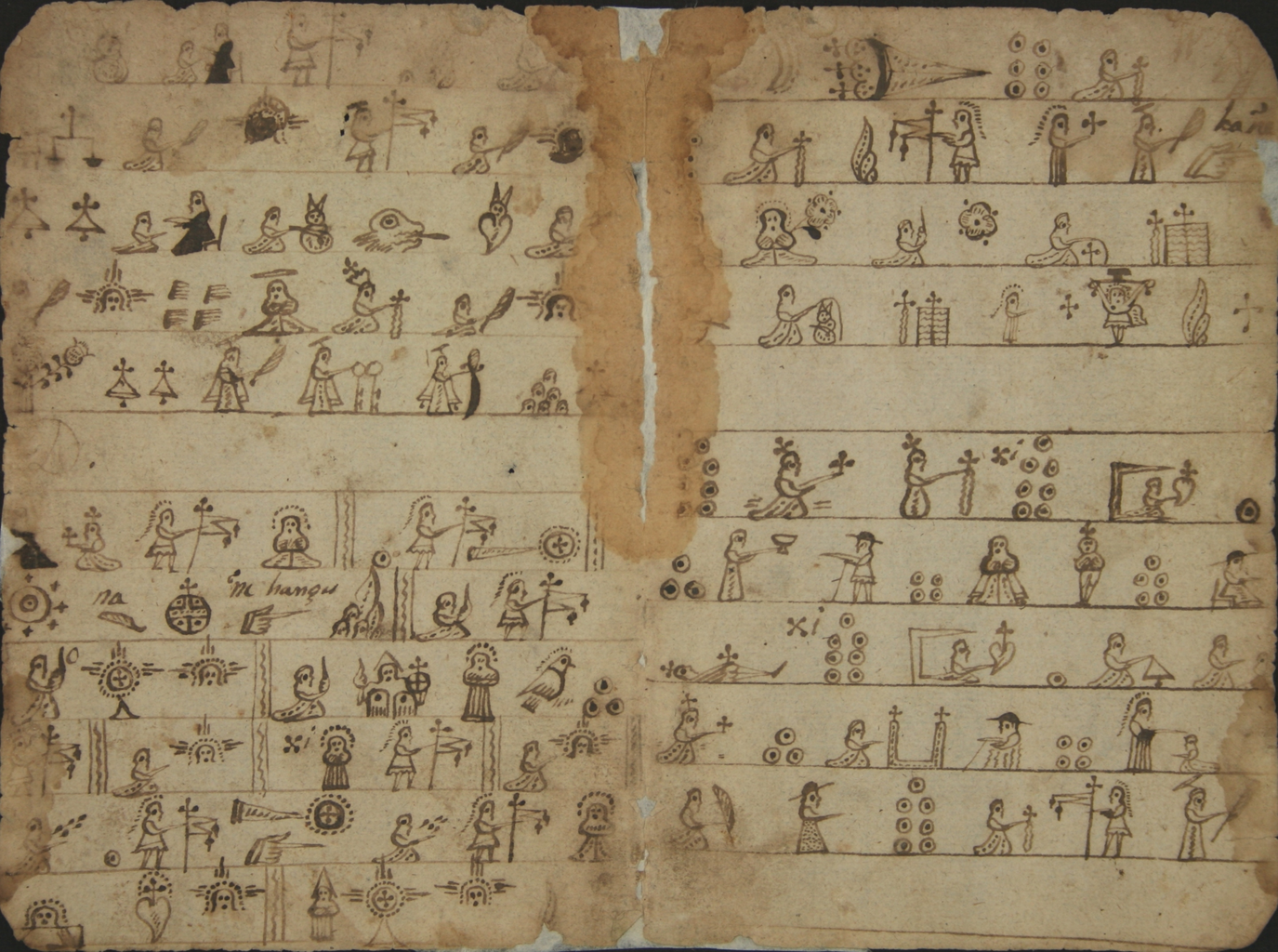
- Region: El Salvador Nicaragua and Mexico: México (state), Distrito Federal, Puebla, Veracruz, Hidalgo, Guerrero, Morelos, San Luis Potosi, Oaxaca, Michoacán and Durango
- Language family: Uto-Aztecan: Nahuan

Official status
- Regulated by: Instituto Nacional de Lenguas Indígenas

Language codes
- ISO 639-2: nah
- ISO 639-3: Variously: nhn – Central Nahuatl nch – Central Huasteca Nahuatl ncx – Central Puebla Nahuatl nci – Classical Nahuatl naz – Coatepec Nahuatl azd – Eastern Durango Nahuatl nhe – Eastern Huasteca Nahuatl ngu – Guerrero Nahuatl azz – Highland Puebla Nahuatl nhq – Huaxcaleca Nahuatl nhk – Isthmus-Cosoleacaque Nahuatl nhx – Isthmus-Mecayapan Nahuatl nhp – Isthmus-Pajapan Nahuatl ncl – Michoacán Nahuatl nhm – Morelos Nahuatl nhy – Northern Oaxaca Nahuatl ncj – Northern Puebla Nahuatl nht – Ometepec Nahuatl nlv – Orizaba Nahuatl ppl – Pipil xpo – Pochutec nhz – Santa María la Alta Nahuatl nsu – Sierra Negra Nahuatl npl – Southeastern Puebla Nahuatl nhc – Tabasco Nahuatl nhv – Temascaltepec Nahuatl nhi – Tenango Nahuatl nhg – Tetelcingo Nahuatl nuz – Tlamacazapa Nahuatl azn – Western Durango Nahuatl nhw – Western Huasteca Nahuatl
- Glottolog: azte1234
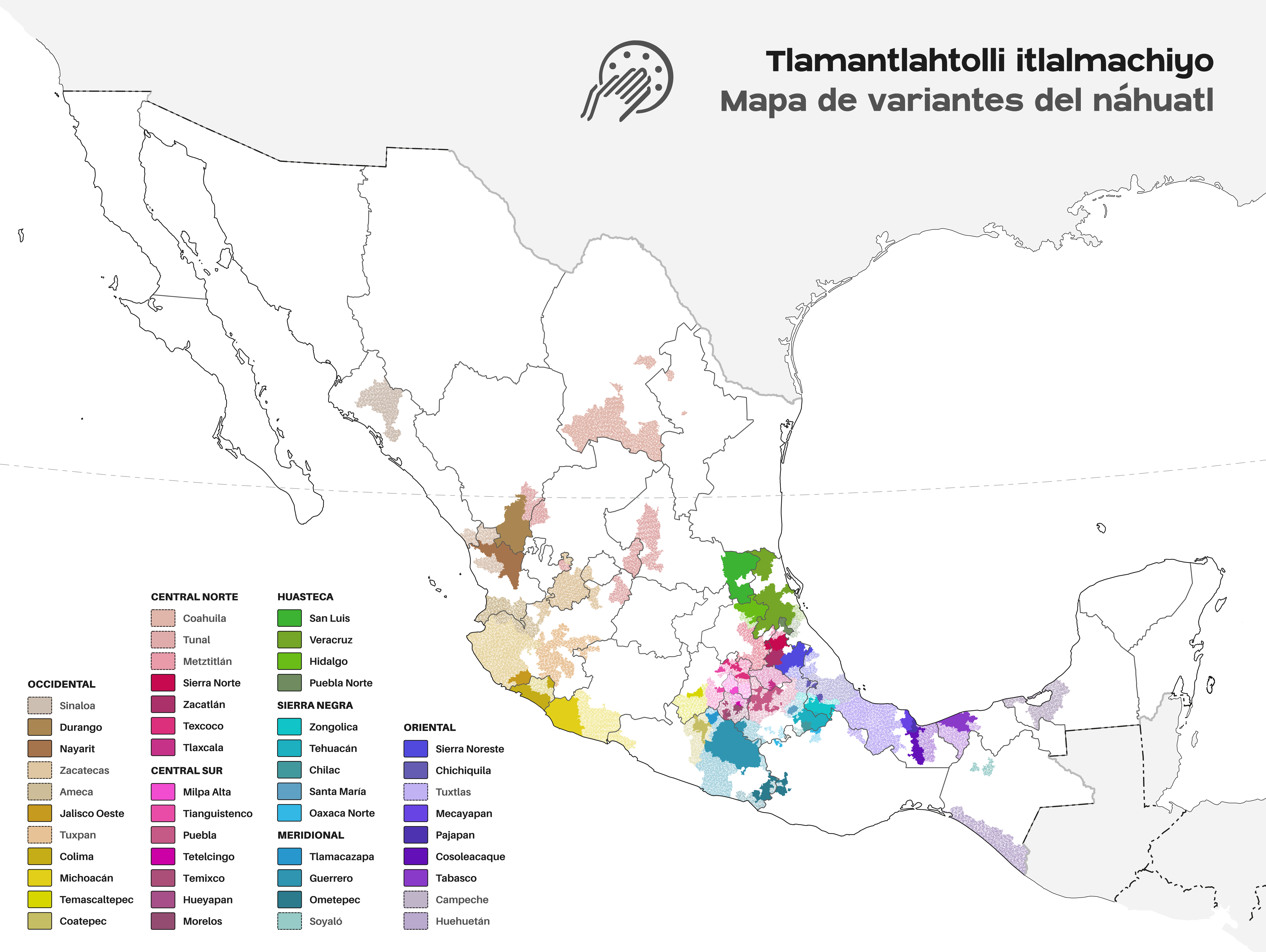
- Map of the main historical and living Nahuatl dialects in Mexico grouped by language branches

The Nahuan or Aztecan languages are those languages of the Uto-Aztecan language family that have undergone a sound change, known as Whorf's law, that changed an original *t to /tɬ/ before *a. Subsequently, some Nahuan languages have changed this /tɬ/ to /l/ or back to /t/, but it can still be seen that the language went through a /tɬ/ stage. The most spoken Nahuatl variant is Huasteca Nahuatl. As a whole, Nahuatl is spoken by about 1.7 million Nahua peoples.

Some authorities, such as the Mexican government, Ethnologue, and Glottolog, consider the varieties of modern Nahuatl to be distinct languages, because they are often mutually unintelligible, their grammars differ and their speakers have distinct ethnic identities. As of 2008, the Mexican government recognizes thirty varieties that are spoken in Mexico as languages (see the list below).

Researchers distinguish between several dialect areas that each have a number of shared features: One classification scheme distinguishes innovative central dialects, spoken around Mexico City, from conservative peripheral ones spoken north, south and east of the central area, while another scheme distinguishes a basic split between western and eastern dialects. Nahuan languages include not just varieties known as Nahuatl, but also Pipil and the extinct Pochutec language.

== Intelligibility ==
The differences among the varieties of Nahuatl are not trivial, and in many cases result in low or no mutual intelligibility: people who speak one variety cannot understand or be understood by those from another. Thus, by that criterion, they could be considered different languages. The ISO divisions referenced below respond to intelligibility more than to historical or reconstructional considerations. Like the higher-level groupings, they also are not self-evident and are subject to considerable controversy.

Nevertheless, the variants all are clearly related and more closely related to each other than to Pochutec, and they and Pochutec are more closely related to each other than to any other Uto-Aztecan languages (such as Cora or Huichol, Tepehuán and Tarahumara, Yaqui or Mayo, etc.)

== Historical linguistic research ==
Little work has been done in the way of the historical linguistics of Nahuatl proper or the Aztecan (nowadays often renamed Nahuan) branch of Uto-Aztecan.

Lyle Campbell and Ronald W. Langacker, in a paper whose focus was the internal reconstruction of the vowels of Proto-Aztecan (or Proto-Nahuan), made two proposals of lasting impact regarding the internal classification of the Aztecan branch. They introduced the claim, which would quickly be received as proven beyond virtually any doubt, that the well known change of Proto-Uto-Aztecan */ta-/ to */t͡ɬa-/ was a development in Proto-Aztecan (Proto-Nahuan), not a later development in some dialects descended from Proto-Aztecan.

Second, they adduced new arguments for dividing the branch in two subdivisions: Pochutec, whose sole member is the Pochutec language, which became extinct sometime in the 20th century, and General Aztec, which includes the Pipil language and all dialects spoken in Mexico which are clearly closely related to the extinct literary language, Classical Nahuatl. This binary division of Aztecan (Nahuan) was already the majority opinion among specialists, but Campbell and Langacker's new arguments were received as being compelling. (Canger 1988:42-44) Furthermore, in "adopt[ing] the term 'General Aztec'", they may in fact have been the ones to introduce this designation. Part of their reconstruction of the Proto-Aztecan vowels was disputed by Dakin.

The most comprehensive study of the history of Nahuan languages is Una Canger's "Five Studies inspired by Nahuatl verbs in -oa" (Canger 1980), in which she explores the historical development of grammar of the verbs ending in -oa and -ia. Canger shows that verbs in -oa and -ia are historically and grammatically distinct from verbs in -iya and -owa, although they are not distinguished in pronunciation in any modern dialects. She shows the historical basis for the five verb classes, based on how they form the perfect tense-aspect, and she shows that all of the different forms of the perfect tense-aspect derives from a single -ki morpheme that has developed differently depending on the phonological shape of the verb to which it was suffixed. She also explains the historical development of the applicative suffix with the shape -lia and -lwia as coming from a single suffix of the shape -liwa.

In 1984 Canger and Dakin published an article in which they showed that Proto-Nahuan *ɨ had become /e/ in some Nahuan dialects and /i/ in others, and they proposed that this split was among the oldest splits of the Nahuan group.

Dakin has proposed a historical internal classification of Nahuan. She asserts two groups of migrations in central Mexico and eventually southwards to Central America. The first produced Eastern dialects. Centuries later, the second group of migrations produced Western dialects. But many modern dialects are the result of blending between particular Eastern dialects and particular Western dialects.

Campbell in his grammar of Pipil discussed the problem of classifying Pipil. Pipil is either a descendant of Nahuatl (in his estimation) or still to this day a variety of Nahuatl (in the estimation of, for example, Lastra de Suárez and Dakin).

Dakin (1982) is a book-length study (in Spanish) of the phonological evolution of Proto-Nahuatl. She earlier suggested that irregularities in the modern Nahuatl system of possessive prefixes might be due to the presence in Proto-Nahuan of distinct grammatical marking for two types of possession.

In the 1990s, two papers appeared addressing the old research problem of the "saltillo" in Nahuatl: a rediscovered paper by Whorf (1993), and a paper by Manaster Ramer.

== Modern classification ==
A Center-Periphery scheme was introduced by Canger in 1978, and supported by comparative historical data in 1980. Lastra de Suarez's dialect atlas divided dialects into center and peripheral areas based on strictly synchronic evidence. The subsequent 1988 article by Canger adduced further historical evidence for this division.

=== Studies of individual dialects ===
Until the middle of the 20th century, scholarship on Nahuan languages was limited almost entirely to the literary language that existed approximately 1540–1770 (which is now known as Classical Nahuatl, although the descriptor "classical" was never used until the 20th century). Since the 1930s, there have appeared several grammars of individual modern dialects (in either article or book form), in addition to articles of narrower scope.

=== Classification ===
The history of research into Nahuan dialect classification in the 20th century up to 1988 has been reviewed by Canger (1988). Before 1978, classification proposals had relied to a greater or lesser degree on the three way interdialectal sound correspondence /t͡ɬ ~ t ~ l/ (the lateral affricate /t͡ɬ/ of Classical Nahuatl and many other dialects corresponds to /t/ in some eastern and southern dialects and to /l/ in yet other dialects). Benjamin Lee Whorf (1937) had performed an analysis and concluded that /t͡ɬ/ was the reflex of Proto-Uto-Aztecan */t/ before /a/ (a conclusion which has been borne out). But in 1978 Campbell and Langacker made the novel proposal—which met with immediate universal acceptance—that this sound change had occurred back in Proto-Aztecan (the ancestor dialect of Pochutec and General Aztec) and that therefore the corresponding /t/ or /l/ in Nahuatl dialects were innovations.

As a geographical note: the northern part of the State of Puebla is universally recognized as having two subgroupings. The northern part of the State of Puebla is a long north to south lobe. In the middle of it from east-northeast to west-southwest runs the Sierra de Puebla (as Nahuanist linguists call it) or Sierra Norte de Puebla (as geographers call it). The "Sierra de Puebla" dialects are quite distinct from the "northern Puebla" dialects, which are spoken in northernmost Puebla State and very small parts of neighboring states.

==== Eastern–Western division ====
Dakin (2003:261) gives the following classification of Nahuatl dialects (in which the word "north" has been replaced by "northern"), based on her earlier publications, e.g., Dakin (2000).

- Nahuatl
  - Eastern Nahuatl
    - Huastec
    - Guerrero
    - Sierra Puebla
    - Tehuacán–Zongolica
    - Isthmus
    - Pipil
  - Western Nahuatl
    - Central Nahuatl
      - Classical Nahuatl
      - Tlaxcala–Puebla
      - Central Puebla
      - Ometepec
      - Northern Puebla
    - Western Peripheral
      - Mexicanero
      - Coatepec
      - Temascaltepec
      - Michoacán
      - Pochutec

Most specialists in Pipil (El Salvador) consider it to have diverged from Nahuatl to the point it should no longer be considered a variety of Nahuatl. Most specialists in Nahuan do not consider Pochutec to have ever been a variety of Nahuatl.

==== Center–Periphery division ====
Canger (1978; 1980) and Lastra de Suarez (1986) have made classification schemes based on data and methodology which each investigator has well documented. Canger proposed a single Central grouping and several Peripheral groupings. The Center grouping is hypothesized to have arisen during the Aztec Empire by diffusion of the defining feature (an innovative verb form) and other features from the prestigious dialect of the capital. The dialects which adopted it could be from multiple genetic divisions of General Aztec. As for the various Peripheral groupings, their identity as Peripheral is defined negatively, i.e., by their lack the grammatical feature which, it is proposed, defines the Central grouping. Canger recognized the possibility that centuries of population migrations and other grammatical feature diffusions may have combined to obscure the genetic relationships (the branching evolution) among the dialects of Nahuatl.

Some of the isoglosses used by Canger to establish the Peripheral vs. Central dialectal dichotomy are these:

| Central | Peripheral |
|---|---|
| #e- initial vowel e | #ye- epenthetic y before initial e |
| mochi "all" | nochi "all" |
| totoltetl "egg" | teksistli "egg" |
| tesi "to grind" | tisi "to grind" |
| -h/ʔ plural subject suffix | -lo plural subject suffix |
| -tin preferred noun plural | -meh preferred noun plural |
| o- past augment | – absence of augment |
| -nki/-wki perfect participle forms | -nik/-wik perfect participle forms |
| tliltik "black" | yayawik "black" |
| -ki agentive suffix | -ketl/-katl agentive suffix |

Lastra de Suárez in her Nahuatl dialect atlas affirmed the concept of the Center/Periphery geographic dichotomy, but amended Canger's assignment of some subgroupings to the Center or the Periphery. The three most important divergences are probably those involving Huastec dialects, Sierra de Zongolica dialects, and northwestern Guerrero dialects. Lastra classifies these as Peripheral, Central, and Central, respectively, while in each case Canger does the opposite.

The dialectal situation is very complex and most categorizations, including the one presented above, are, in the nature of things, controversial. Lastra wrote, "The isoglosses rarely coincide. As a result, one can give greater or lesser importance to a feature and make the [dialectal] division that one judges appropriate/convenient". And she warned: "We insist that this classification is not [entirely] satisfactory". Both researchers emphasized the need for more data in order for there to be advances in the field of Nahuatl dialectology. Since the 1970s, there has been an increase in research whose immediate aim is the production of grammars and dictionaries of individual dialects. But there is also a detailed study of dialect variation in the dialect subgroup sometimes known as the Zongolica (Andrés Hasler 1996). A. Hasler sums up the difficulty of classifying Zongolica thus (1996:164): "Juan Hasler (1958:338) interprets the presence in the region of [a mix of] eastern dialect features and central dialect features as an indication of a substratum of eastern Nahuatl and a superstratum of central Nahuatl. Una Canger (1980:15–20) classifies the region as part of the eastern area, while Yolanda Lastra (1986:189–190) classifies it as part of the central area."

As already alluded to, the nucleus of the Central dialect territory is the Valley of Mexico. The extinct Classical Nahuatl, the enormously influential language spoken by the people of Tenochtitlan, the Aztec capital, is one of the Central dialects. Lastra in her dialect atlas proposed three Peripheral groupings: eastern, western, and Huasteca. She included Pipil in Nahuatl, assigning it to the Eastern Periphery grouping. Lastra's classification of dialects of modern Nahuatl is as follows (many of the labels refer to Mexican states):

- modern Nahuatl
  - Western Periphery
    - West coast
    - Western México State
    - Durango–Nayarit
  - Eastern Periphery
    - Sierra de Puebla
    - Isthmus
    - Pipil
  - Huasteca
  - Center
    - Nuclear subarea (in and near Mexico, D.F.)
    - Puebla–Tlaxcala (areas by the border between the states of Puebla and Tlaxcala)
    - Xochiltepec–Huatlatlauca (south of the city of Puebla)
    - Southeastern Puebla (this grouping extends over the Sierra de Zongolica located in the neighboring state of Veracruz)
    - Central Guerrero (so called; actually northern Guerrero, specifically the region of the Balsas River)
    - Southern Guerrero

=== List of Nahuatl dialects recognized by the Mexican government ===
This list is taken from the Instituto Nacional de Lenguas Indígenas (INALI)'s Catálogo de Lenguas Indígenas Nacionales. The full document has variations on the names especially "autodenominaciones" ("self designations", the names these dialect communities use for their language), along with lists of towns where each variant is spoken.

- Náhuatl de la Sierra, noreste de Puebla
- Náhuatl del noroeste central
- Náhuatl del Istmo
- Mexicano de la Huasteca veracruzana
- Náhuatl de la Huasteca potosina
- Náhuatl de Oaxaca
- Náhuatl de la Sierra negra, sur
- Náhuatl de la Sierra negra, norte
- Náhuatl central de Veracruz
- Náhuatl de la Sierra oeste
- Náhuatl alto del norte de Puebla
- Náhuatl del Istmo bajo
- Náhuatl del centro de Puebla
- Mexicano bajo de occidente
- Mexicano del noroeste (spoken by Mexicaneros)
- Mexicano de Guerrero
- Mexicano de occidente
- Mexicano central de occidente
- Mexicano central bajo
- Mexicano de Temixco
- Mexicano de Puente de Ixtla
- Mexicano de Tetela del Volcán
- Mexicano alto de occidente (spoken by Mexicaneros)
- Mexicano del oriente
- Mexicano del oriente central
- Mexicano del centro bajo
- Mexicano del centro alto
- Mexicano del centro
- Mexicano del oriente de Puebla
- Mexicano de la Huasteca Hidalguense

=== List of Nahuatl dialects recognized in ISO 639-3, ordered by number of speakers ===
(name [ISO subgroup code] – location(s) ~approx. number of speakers)

- Eastern Huasteca [nhe] – Hidalgo, Western Veracruz, Northern Puebla ~450,000
- Western Huasteca [nhw] – San Luis Potosí, Western Hidalgo ~450,000
- Guerrero [ngu] – Guerrero ~200,000
- Orizaba [nlv] – Central Veracruz ~140,000
- Southeastern Puebla [nhs] – Southeast Puebla ~135,000
- Highland Puebla [azz] – Puebla Highlands ~125,000
- Northern Puebla [ncj] – Northern Puebla ~66,000
- Central [nhn] – Tlaxcala, Puebla ~50,000
- Isthmus-Mecayapan [nhx] – Southern Veracruz ~20,000
- Central Puebla [ncx] – Central Puebla ~18,000
- Morelos [nhm] – Morelos ~15,000
- Northern Oaxaca [nhy] – Northwestern Oaxaca, Southeastern Puebla ~10,000
- Huaxcaleca [nhq] – Puebla ~7,000
- Isthmus-Pajapan [nhp] – Southern Veracruz ~7,000
- Isthmus-Cosoleacaque [nhk] – Northwestern Coastal Chiapas, Southern Veracruz ~5,500
- Tetelcingo [nhg] – Morelos ~3,500
- Michoacán [ncl] – Michoacán ~3,000
- Santa María de la Alta [nhz] – Northwest Puebla ~3,000
- Tenango [nhi] – Northern Puebla ~2,000
- Tlamacazapa [nuz] – Morelos ~1,500
- Coatepec [naz] – Southwestern México State, Northwestern Guerrero ~1,500
- Durango [nln] – Southern Durango ~1,000
- Ometepec [nht] – Southern Guerrero, Western Oaxaca ~500
- Temascaltepec [nhv] – Southwestern México State ~300
- Tlalitzlipa [nhj] – Puebla ~100
- Pipil [ppl] – El Salvador ~500
- Tabasco [nhc] – Tabasco ~30

Geographical distributions of Nahuan languages by ISO code:

| Language | ISO 639-3 code | State(s) | Municipalities and towns |
|---|---|---|---|
| Nahuatl, Morelos | nhm | Morelos and Puebla | Morelos state: Miacatlán municipality, Coatetelco; Puente de Ixtla municipality, Xoxocotla; Temixco municipality, Cuentepec; Tepoztlán municipality, Santa Catarina; Tetela del Volcán municipality, Hueyapan, Alpanocan; Puebla state: Acteopan municipality, San Marcos Acteopan and San Felipe Toctla |
| Nahuatl, Santa María la Alta | nhz | Puebla | Atenayuca, Santa María la Alta; a few northwest of Tehuacán |
| Nahuatl, Zacatlán-Ahuacatlán-Tepetzintla | nhi | Puebla | Ahuacatlán, Chachayohquila, Cuacuila, Cuacuilco, Cualtepec Ixquihuacán, San Miguel Tenango, Santa Catarina Omitlán, Tenantitla, Tepetzintla, Tetelatzingo, Tlalitzlipa, Xochitlasco, Xonotla, Yehuala, Zacatlán north of Puebla City, Zoquitla |
| Nahuatl, Coatepec | naz | México | Acapetlahuaya, Chilacachapa, Coatepec Costales, Guerrero, Los Sabinos, Machito de las Flores, Maxela, Miacacsingo, Texcalco, Tlacultlapa, Tonalapa |
| Nahuatl, Isthmus-Cosoleacaque | nhk | Veracruz | Veracruz-Llave, from Jáltipan de Morelos southeast to Rio Chiquito, north bank; other communities: Cosoleacaque, Oteapan, Hidalgotitlán, and Soconusco |
| Nahuatl, Isthmus-Mecayapan | nhx | Veracruz | Mecayapan municipality, Mecayapan and Tatahuicapan towns |
| Nahuatl, Orizaba | nlv | Veracruz, Puebla, and Oaxaca | Veracruz state: Orizaba; Puebla state: north of Lake Miguel Alemán; Oaxaca state: small area northwest of Acatlán |
| Nahuatl, Sierra Negra | nsu | Puebla | 13 towns in south |
| Nahuatl, Western Huasteca | nhw | San Luis Potosí | Tamazunchale center, Xilitla; Hidalgo state: Chapulhuacan, Lolotla, Pisaflores, portions of San Felipe Orizatlán, Tepehuacán de Guerrero, and Tlanchinol municipalities. 1,500 villages. |
| Nahuatl, Central | nhn | Tlaxcala and Puebla | San Miguel Canoa, Huejotzingo, San Andrés Cholula, San Pedro Cholula, Puebla City, Zitlaltepec, Tlaxcala City, Santa Ana Chauhtempan and Amecameca. |
| Nahuatl, Central Huasteca | nch | Hidalgo | Huejutla, Xochiatipan, Huauhtla, Atlapexco, Jaltocán, Calnali, Chalma, Platon Sanchez border area west of Cototlán and Veracruz-Llave; possibly San Luis Potosí |
| Nahuatl, Central Puebla | ncx | Puebla | Atoyatempan, Huatlathauca, and Huehuetlán near Molcaxac, south of Puebla city, Teopantlán, Tepatlaxco de Hidalgo, Tochimilco |
| Nahuatl, Eastern Durango | azd | Durango and Nayarit | Durango state: Mezquital municipality, Agua Caliente, Agua Fria, La Tinaja, and San Pedro Jicora; Nayarit state: Del Nayer municipality |
| Nahuatl, Eastern Huasteca | nhe | Hidalgo and Puebla | Francisco Z. Mena municipality; Veracruz state: interior west of Tuxpan. 1500 villages. |
| Nahuatl, Guerrero | ngu | Guerrero | Ahuacuotzingo, Alcozauca de Guerrero, Alpoyeca, Atenango del Río, Atlixtac, Ayutla de los Libres, Chiulapa de Álvarez, Comonfort, Copalillo, Cualac, Huamuxtitlán, Huitzuco de los Figueroa, Mártir de Cuilapan, Mochitlán, Olinalá, Quechultenango, Tepecoacuilco de Trujano, Tixtla de Guerrero, Tlapa de Xalpatláhuac, Xochihuehuetlán, Zapotitlan Tablas, and Zitlala municipalities, Balsas River area |
| Nahuatl, Highland Puebla | azz | Puebla | near Jopala; Veracruz state: south of Entabladero |
| Nahuatl, Huaxcaleca | nhq | Veracruz | inland area surrounding Córdoba |
| Nahuatl, Isthmus-Pajapan | nhp | Veracruz | Pajapan municipality on Gulf of Mexico, Jicacal, San Juan Volador, Santanón, and Sayultepec towns |
| Nahuatl, Michoacán | ncl | Michoacán | Maruata Pómaro on Pacific Ocean coast |
| Nahuatl, Northern Oaxaca | nhy | Oaxaca | Apixtepec, Cosolapa, El Manzano de Mazatlán, San Antonio Nanahuatipan, San Gabriel Casa Blanca, San Martín Toxpalan, Santa María Teopoxco, Teotitlán del Camino; Ignacio Zaragosa, and Tesonapa (1 of the last 2 towns in Veracruz); Puebla state: Coxcatlán |
| Nahuatl, Northern Puebla | ncj | Puebla | Naupan and Acaxochitlán. |
| Nahuatl, Ometepec | nht | Guerrero | Acatepec, Arcelia, El Carmen, Quetzalapa de Azoyú, and Rancho de Cuananchinicha; Oaxaca state: Juxtlahuaca District, Cruz Alta, and San Vicente Piñas; Putla District, Concepción Guerrero |
| Nahuatl, Southeastern Puebla | npl | Puebla | Tehuacán region: Chilac and San Sebastián Zinacatepec areas |
| Nahuatl, Tabasco | nhc | Tabasco | Comalcalco municipality, La Lagartera and Paso de Cupilco |
| Nahuatl, Temascaltepec | nhv | México | La Comunidad, Potrero de San José, San Mateo Almomoloa, and Santa Ana, southwest of Toluca |
| Nahuatl, Tetelcingo | nhg | Morelos | Tetelcingo |
| Nahuatl, Tlamacazapa | nuz | Guerrero and Morelos | Guerrero state: border area northeast of Taxco; Morelos state: west of Tequesquitengo Lake |
| Nahuatl, Western Durango | azn | Durango and Nayarit | Durango State: Mezquital municipality, Alacranes, Curachitos de Buenavista, San Agustin de Buenaventura, San Diego, Tepalcates, and Tepetates II (Berenjenas); Nayarit state: Acaponeta municipality, El Duraznito, La Laguna, Mesa de las Arpas, and Santa Cruz |

== See also ==
- Nahuatl
- Pochutec
- Pipil language
- Nahuatl transcription

== Bibliography ==
- Campbell, Lyle (1985). The Pipil Language of El Salvador. Mouton Grammar Library, no. 1. Berlin: Mouton de Gruyter. ISBN 978-3-11-010344-1. OCLC 13433705.
- Campbell, Lyle; Ronald Langacker (1978). "Proto-Aztecan vowels: Part I". International Journal of American Linguistics. 44 (2). Chicago: University of Chicago Press: 85–102. doi:10.1086/465526. OCLC 1753556. S2CID 143091460.
- Canger, Una (1980). Five Studies Inspired by Náhuatl Verbs in -oa. Travaux du Cercle Linguistique de Copenhague, Vol. XIX. Copenhagen: The Linguistic Circle of Copenhagen; distributed by C.A. Reitzels Boghandel. ISBN 87-7421-254-0. OCLC 7276374.
- Canger, Una (1988). "Nahuatl dialectology: A survey and some suggestions". International Journal of American Linguistics. 54 (1). Chicago: University of Chicago Press: 28–72. doi:10.1086/466074. OCLC 1753556. S2CID 144210796.
- Canger, Una; Karen Dakin (1985). "An inconspicuous basic split in Nahuatl". International Journal of American Linguistics. 51 (4): 358–361. doi:10.1086/465892. S2CID 143084964.
- Canger, Una (1988). "Subgrupos de los dialectos nahuas". In J. Kathryn Josserand; Karen Dakin (eds.). Smoke and Mist: Mesoamerican Studies in Memory of Thelma D. Sullivan. British Archaeological Reports (BAR). BAR International Series. Vol. 2. Oxford. pp. 473–498.
- Dakin, Karen (1974). "Dialectología náhuatl de Morelos: Un estudio preliminar". Estudios de Cultura Náhuatl. 11: 227–234.
- Dakin, Karen (1982). La evolución fonológica del Protonáhuatl (in Spanish). México D.F.: Universidad Nacional Autónoma de México, Instituto de Investigaciones Filológicas. ISBN 968-5802-92-0. OCLC 10216962.
- Dakin, Karen (1994). "El náhuatl en el yutoazteca sureño: algunas isoglosas gramaticales y fonológicas". In Carolyn MacKay; Verónica Vázquez (eds.). Investigaciones lingüísticas en Mesoamérica. Estudios sobre Lenguas Americanas, no. 1 (in Spanish). México D.F.: Universidad Nacional Autónoma de México, Instituto de Investigaciones Filológicas, Seminario de Lenguas Indígenas. pp. 3–86. ISBN 968-36-4055-9. OCLC 34716589.
- Dakin, Karen (1983). "Proto-Aztecan vowels and Pochutec: an alternative analysis". International Journal of American Linguistics. 49 (2): 196–203. doi:10.1086/465782. S2CID 143920332.
- Dakin, Karen (1991). "Nahuatl Direct and Mediated Possession: A Historical Explanation for Irregularities". International Journal of American Linguistics. 57 (3): 298–329. doi:10.1086/ijal.57.3.3519722. JSTOR 3519722. S2CID 151441318.
- Dakin, Karen (2000). "Proto-Uto-Aztecan *p and the e-/ye- isogloss in Nahuatl dialectology". In Eugene Casad; Thomas Willett (eds.). Uto-Aztecan : structural, temporal, and geographic perspectives: papers in memory of Wick R. Miller by the Friends of Uto-Aztecan. Hermosillo, Sonora: UniSon (Universidad de Sonora, División de Humanidades y Bellas Artes).
- Dakin, Karen (2003). "Uto-Aztecan in the Linguistic Stratigraphy of Mesoamerican Prehistory". In Henning Andersen (ed.). Language contacts in prehistory: studies in stratigraphy. John Benjamins. pp. 259–288. ISBN 1588113795.
- Dakin, Karen, ed. (2001). "Estudios sobre el náhuatl". Avances y balances de lenguas yutoaztecas. Mexico: Instituto Nacional de Antropología e Historia, UNAM. ISBN 970-18-6966-4.
- Sullivan, Thelma D. (1979). Dakin, Karen (ed.). Dialectología del náhuatl de los siglos XVI y XVI. Rutas de intercambio en Mesoamérica y el Norte de Mexico, XVI. Round Table. Vol. II. Saltillo, September 9–15. pp. 291–297.
- Hasler, Andrés (1996). El náhuatl de Tehuacan-Zongolica. Mexico: CIESAS.
- Kaufman, Terrence (2001). The history of the Nawa language group from the earliest times to the sixteenth century: some initial results (PDF).
- Lastra de Suárez, Yolanda (1986). Las áreas dialectales del náhuatl moderno. Serie antropológica, no. 62 (in Spanish). Ciudad Universitaria, México, D.F.: Universidad Nacional Autónoma de México, Instituto de Investigaciones Antropológicas. ISBN 968-837-744-9. OCLC 19632019.
- Lastra de Suárez, Yolanda (1981). "Stress in modern Nahuatl dialects". Nahuatl Studies in Memory of Fernando Horcasitas. Texas Linguistic Forum. Vol. 18. Austin: The University of Texas, Department of Linguistics. pp. 19–128.
- Manaster Ramer, Alexis (1995). "The Search for the Sources of the Nahuatl Saltillo". Anthropological Linguistics. 37 (1): 1–15.
- Whorf, Benjamin Lee (1937). "The origin of Aztec tl". American Anthropologist. 39 (2): 265–274. doi:10.1525/aa.1937.39.2.02a00070.
- Whorf, Benjamin Lee; Frances Karttunen; Lyle Campbell (1993). "Pitch Tone and the "Saltillo" in Modern and Ancient Nahuatl". International Journal of American Linguistics. 59 (2). Chicago: University of Chicago Press: 165–223. doi:10.1086/466194. OCLC 1753556. S2CID 144639961.
