= Western Peripheral Nahuatl =

Aztecan language group of Mexico

- Geographic distribution: Puebla, Isthmus of Tehuantepec, El Salvador
- Linguistic classification: Uto-Aztecan: Aztecan (Nahuan); Nahuatl; Western Peripheral Nahuatl
- Subdivisions: Durango–Nayarit; West Coast; Western Mexico State; Pochutec

Language codes
- Glottolog: west2814 (mostly a match)

Western Peripheral Nahuatl is a group of Nahuatl languages of Western Mexico. They are:

- Michoacán a.k.a. Pómaro Nahuatl on the west coast
- Coatepec and Temascaltepec Nahuatl of western México State and northwestern Guerrero
- Colima–Durango: Mexicanero and extinct dialects of Colima
- Jalisco-Nayarit: extinct, formerly spoken in Cuautitlán de García Barragán

Pochutec may belong here.
