= NUZ =

NUZ can refer to:

- Umlazi, South Africa, a township with license plate code "NUZ"
- The ISO code for Guerrero Nahuatl, a language spoken in Mexico

== See also ==
- Big Nuz
- News
- Nuzzle
