= NHY =

NHY may refer to:

- New Hey railway station, England (National Rail station code)
- New York and Oslo Stock Exchange symbols for Norsk Hydro
- Northern Oaxaca, a dialect of Tehuacan–Zongolica Nahuatl language, ISO 639-3 code nhy
