= Jalisco Nahuatl =

Aztecan language spoken in Mexico

- Native to: Mexico
- Region: Jalisco
- Native speakers: ± 150
- Language family: Uto-Aztecan: Aztecan (Nahuan); Nahuatl (dialects); Western Peripheral Nahuatl; Jalisco-Nayarit; Jalisco Nahuatl

Language codes
- ISO 639-3: ?

Jalisco Nahuatl, also known as Western Nahuatl or Western Mexican Nahuatl, is a variety of Nahuatl historically spoken in the Mexican state of Jalisco. Its endangerment status is unknown; INALI considered that there were still speakers in the municipality of Cuautitlán de García Barragán in 2008, although there is no modern linguistic study that describes it as spoken there. Bibliographic references commonly describe the variant as it was spoken in the municipality of Tuxpan, south of Zapotlán el Grande (formerly Ciudad Guzmán). In 2008, it was reportedly still spoken in Colima, which INALI calls "Western Low Mexicano". Valiñas Coalla (1979) had predicted its extinction before the year 2020. Ethnologue does not consider it in its general scheme, nor does Glottolog classify it in its descriptive scheme.

== Documentation ==
A grammar titled Arte de la lengua mexicana. Que fue usual entre los indios del obispado de Guadalajara y de parte de los de Durango y Michoacán was compiled in 1692 by Friar Juan Guerra. This is considered the first printed grammar to describe a variety besides Classical Nahuatl. In 1765 another friar, Jerónimo Tomás de Aquino Cortés y Zedeño, developed another, more detailed grammar that included a vocabulary and a confessional.

At the beginning of the 20th century, several scholars described ethnographic aspects of the indigenous people of the region and thus modern descriptions of the speech were gradually compiled, such as the studies of José María Arreola and the parish priest Melquiades Ruvalcaba, who also developed, although simple, another grammar of this variant. The most important studies took place in the late sixties and during the seventies, when the language was already in danger of extinction.

== Phonology ==
Leopoldo Valiñas provided a phonemic inventory of the dialect of Tuxpan.

=== Vowels ===
	Front	Central	Back
Close	i		u
Mid	e		o
Open		a	

There is no distinction in length, unlike many other Nahuatl varieties.

=== Consonants ===
	Bilabial	Dental	Alveolar	Postalveolar	Velar	Glottal
Plosive	p	t			k, kʷ	
Fricative			s	ʃ		h
Affricate			ts	tʃ		
Lateral			l ~ ɬ			
Nasal	m		n			
Semivowel	w			j		

Language Revitalization Efforts in the 2020s

This work has been undertaken by the Nahua communities themselves, community-centered language revitalization efforts by the Jalisco diaspora, academics from Universidad de Guadalajara like Dr. Rosa Yañez and the state government. In fact, the Speaknahuatl Collective started teaching Mexicano in the Spring of 2023 and continues year-round with 4 semesters each year. Additionally, they were part of the colloquium El náhuatl de y en el Occidente de México (Nahuatl of and in Western Mexico) that took place on September 19–20, 2024. The colloquium was organized by Dr. Rosa Yañez, Saïd Barguigue, Chris Cuauhtli, Ricardo M. García, and others, and after that, a book was created as a result. The book is titled the same but with the word Cihuatlampa (West) added in front. Additionally, on October 3, 2023, the Primer Encuentro de Pueblos Nahuas de Jalisco (First Gathering of Nahua Peoples of Jalisco) brought Nahua communities together to celebrate and strengthen their language and culture. The Primer Encuentro Estatal de Lenguas y Literaturas Indígenas ELLI (First State Gathering of Indigenous Languages and Literatures) followed on August 13–15, 2025, and the gathering took place again on August 18–21, 2026. These linguistic and cultural gatherings and educational initiatives show ongoing efforts to preserve and promote Indigenous languages, literature, traditions, and cultural identity in Jalisco and for the Jalisco diaspora.
