= NCX =

NCX or ncx may refer to:

- Sodium-calcium exchanger, or NCX, a transport protein
- Nanchang West railway station, Jiangxi, China, Pinyin station code NCX
- Central Puebla Nahuatl language, ISO 639-3 language code ncx
- .ncx, a file extension
