= NHG =

NHG may refer to:

- The New Hampshire Gazette
- New High German
- the ISO 639-3 code for the Tetelcingo Nahuatl language
- National Healthcare Group, a group of healthcare institutions in Singapore
- London Underground station code for Notting Hill Gate tube station
- Neue Haas Grotesk, the former name of Helvetica
- New Hope Group, Australian mining company
