= Isthmus Nahuatl =

Nahuatl dialect cluster of Veracruz, Mexico

- melaꞌtájto̱l
- Native to: Mexico
- Region: Veracruz, Tabasco
- Native speakers: (39,000 cited 1990–2000)
- Language family: Uto-Aztecan: Aztecan (Nahuan); Nahuatl; Eastern Peripheral Nahuatl; Isthmus Nahuatl
- Writing system: Latin

Language codes
- ISO 639-3: Variously: nhk – Cosoleacaque nhx – Mecayapan nhp – Pajapan
- Glottolog: isth1245

Isthmus Nahuatl (Isthmus Nahuat; native name: melaꞌtájto̱l) is a Nahuatl dialect cluster spoken by about 30,000 people in Veracruz, Mexico. According to Ethnologue 16, the Cosoleacaque dialect is 84% intelligible with Pajapan, and 83% intelligible with Mecayapan.

== Communities ==
It is spoken in the following Veracruzan communities:

- Municipality of Cosoleacaque (settlements of Arroyo el Limón, Bajo Grande, Barrancas (Buenos Aires), Cajiapan, Calzadas (Kilómetro Catorce), Canticas, Cascajal II, Cerro Blanco, Coacotla, Cocal, Colonia Luis Donaldo Colosio, Cosoleacaque, Desviación a San Antonio, Ejido la Bomba, Ejido la Colmena, El Rincón de la Colmena (Sección Carrizal), El Arenal, El Bejarito, El Cascajal, El Colorado, El Conejo, El Coyote, El Gavilán, El Kilómetro Diecisiete, El Limón, El Manguito, El Nacaste, El Nanchital, El Naranjito, El Naranjo, El Oasis, El Palmar, El Piñal, El Potrerillo, El Soriano, El Zapote, Entrada a Zapotal, Estero del Pantano, Fernando Gutiérrez Barrios, Fortín de las Flores, Hermenegildo J. Aldana, José F. Gutiérrez, La Capilla, La Ceiba, La Colmena, La Encantada, La Esperanza, La Lagunita, La Magdalena, Las Carmelitas, Las Palmas, Las Palomas, Lázaro Cárdenas, Loma Bella, Loma de Achota, Lomas de Camalotal, Los Dos Hermanos, Los Mangos, Martín Lancero, Mata las Cañas, Minatitlán, Monte Alto, Monte Grande, Mozapan, Mulato, Nacaste (Las Trancas), Nuevo Cantica (Los Cocos), Ojo de Agua, Paso la Lajilla, Potrero Hermoso, Progreso, Quinta Santa Teresita (Sector Flor de Mayo), Rancho Alegre, Rancho las 3 M, Rincón Sabroso, Rincón de las Palmas, San Antonio, San Judas Tadeo, San Pedro Mártir, Santuario, Tacojalpa, Temoloapan, Tlalixcoya, Tulapan, Zacatal Victoria, and Zapote Negro)
- Municipality of Mecayapan (settlements of Arroyo Texizapan, Cerro de la Palma, El Chaparral, El Diamante (Francisco Méndez Vázquez), El Naranjo, El Palmar (Antonio Sánchez Zarate), El Rubí, Encino Amarillo, Guasinapa, Huazuntlán, Ixhuapan, Juan Morales, La Bocana (Dos Bocas), La Ceiba, La Curva, La Lajilla, La Línea, La Perla del Golfo, Los Arrecifes, Los Cedros, Los Tulipanes, Mario Bautista Luis, Mecayapan, Mecayapan Dos, Omar, Plan Agrario, Rancho Ihueras, San Andrés Chamilpa, and Tonalapa)
- Municipality of Pajapan (settlements of 2 Huasteca, Batajapan, Benito Juárez, El Crucero, El Escobar, El Guayabal (Clara Olivera Cruz), El Manantial, El Mangal, El Paraíso (Luis Alberto Yañez), El Pescador (El Moral), El Tulipán (Vicente Matías), El Venado, Familia Cruz, Gustavo Pineda Romero, Jicacal, José María Morelos (Morelos), Las Mangas, Lázaro Cárdenas del Río (Lázaro Cárdenas), Lorenzo Azua Torres, Los Bencomo (San Miguel), Los Martínez, Minzapan, Nanchital, Nancinta, Nuevo Mangal, Pajapan, Palma Real, Playa Linda, San Juan Volador, San Miguel Temoloapan (Nuevo San Miguel), Santa Úrsula (Cesar Ocaña Rueda), Sayultepec, Tecolapa, and Toronjal)
- Municipality of Zaragoza (settlements of Bajo Grande, Campo Nuevo, Carrizal, Cascajal, Colonia Marco Antonio Muñoz, El Laurel, El Roble, El Trébol, Mango Jumuapan, Mangos Salinas, Mangotal, Predio Tapalam, San Martín (Estribillal), San Miguel, Rancho Viejo, Tarcoalolla, Zaragoza)

== Phonology ==
The following description is of the Mecayapan dialect.

=== Vowels ===
	Front	back
Close	i iː	o oː
Mid	e eː	o oː
Open	a aː	

=== Consonants ===
		Labial	Dental	Palatal	Velar	Glottal
Nasal		m	n	ɲ		
Plosive	voiceless	p	t		k	ʔ
Plosive	voiced	b	d		ɡ	
Affricate	voiceless		ts	tʃ		
Affricate	voiced		(dz (Note: Occur only as allophones.))	(dʒ)		
Fricative	voiceless		s	ʃ		h
Fricative	voiced		z	(ʒ)		
Approximant			l	j	w	
Rhotic			r			

== Writing system ==
A a	B b	C c	Ch ch	D d	E e	F f	G g	H h	I i	J j	K k	L l	
/a/	/b/	/k/	/tʃ/	/d/	/e/		/ɡ/		/i j/	/h/	/k/	/l/	
M m	N n	O o	P p	Q q	R r	S s	T t	U u	V v	X x	Y y	Z z	ꞌ
/m/	/n/	/o/	/p/	/k/	/r/	/s/	/t/	/w/		/ʃ/	/j/		/ʔ/

H is used at the beginnings of words before u, and has no value of its own. C is used to represent /k/ before the vowels a and o, while qu is used before i and e.

A macron under the letter (a̱, e̱, i̱, o̱) is used to mark long vowels.

Stress on the second-last syllable of a word that does not end in l or r, and stress on the last syllable of a word that does end in l or r, is unmarked. All other stress patterns are marked with an acute accent on the stressed vowel (á, é, í, ó).

The letters f, k, v and z occur only in loanwords.

== Grammar ==
This variety of Nahuatl has developed a distinction between inclusive and exclusive "we", which Classical Nahuatl and other modern forms of Nahuatl lack. The exclusive form is regularly derived from the first person singular ("I"), while the inclusive continues the suppletive first person plural of Classical Nahuatl.

Classical		Isthmus-Mecayapan	
1st person singular	niquīsa "I leave"	niqui̱sa "I leave"	1st person singular
		niqui̱saj "We (not you) leave"	1st person plural exclusive
1st person plural	tiquīsaj "We leave"	tiqui̱saj "We (including you) leave"	1st person plural inclusive

== Bibliography ==
- Wolgemuth, et al. 2000. Diccionario Náhuatl de los municipios Mecayapan y Tatahuicapan de Juárez, Veracruz.
- Wolgemuth, Carl. 2002. Gramática Náhuatl (melaʼtájto̱l) de los municipios de Mecayapan y tatahuicapan de Juárez, Veracruz (Segunda edición).
- Wolgemuth, Carl. 2007. Nahuatl grammar of the townships of Mecayapan and Tatahuicapan de Juárez, Veracruz. SIL International.
- García de León, Antonio (1976). Pajapan, un dialecto mexicano del Golfo (in Spanish). México, D.F.: INAH.
- Ando Koji. 2007. Gramática náhuatl de Pajapan, Universidad Veracruzana, Xalapa.
