= Morelos Nahuatl =

Nahuatl varieties of Mexico

- Native to: Mexico
- Region: Morelos
- Native speakers: (19,000 cited 2000 census)
- Language family: Uto-Aztecan: Aztecan (Nahuan); Nahuatl; Central Nahuatl; Nuclear; Morelos Nahuatl

Language codes
- ISO 639-3: nhm
- Glottolog: more1259

Morelos Nahuatl includes varieties of the Nahuatl language that are spoken in the state of Morelos, Mexico. In Morelos, Nahuatl is spoken in the communities of Cuentepec, Hueyapan, Santa Catarina, Xoxocotla, Atlacholoayan and Tetelcingo. But Tetelcingo Nahuatl is usually considered a separate variety due to its highly innovative phonology, and has very low mutual intelligibility with the other Morelos variants. Ethnologue also considers the varieties of San Felipe Tocla and Alpanocan to belong to the Morelos Nahuatl group of dialects although they are located in the state of Puebla. The dialects belong to the Central dialects closely related to Classical Nahuatl.

== Phonology ==
The following description is that of the Santa Catarina Morelos dialect:

=== Consonants ===
	Labial	Alveolar		Palatal	Velar		Glottal
	Labial	median	lateral	Palatal	plain	labial	Glottal
Nasal	m	n					
Plosive	p	t			k	kʷ	
Affricate		ts	tɬ	tʃ			
Fricative		s		ʃ			h
Approximant			l	j		w	

/n/ can be heard as [ŋ] when before velar consonants.

=== Vowels ===
	Front	Back
High	i iː	
Mid	e eː	o oː
Low	a aː	
