= Coatepec Nahuatl =

Nahuatl variety of central Mexico

- Region: central Mexico
- Native speakers: (1,400 cited 1990 census)
- Language family: Uto-Aztecan: Aztecan (Nahuan); Nahuatl; Western Peripheral Nahuatl; Western Mexico State; Coatepec Nahuatl
- Writing system: Latin

Language codes
- ISO 639-3: naz
- Glottolog: coat1240

Coatepec Nahuatl is a variety of Nahuatl of southwestern Mexico State and Guerrero spoken by 1,400 people.

== Language ==
It is also known as Coatepec Aztec and Náhuatl de Coatepec. The language is spoken in central Mexico along the border of Mexico and Guerrero states, west of Iguala, Guerrero. It is especially strong in Coatepec Costales and Chilacachapa, and is spoken as far west as Acapetlahuaya and Sultepec. It is written in the Latin script and is predominantly spoken by older adults with 15 monolinguals.

The General History of the Things of New Spain in the Florentine Codex, by Fray Bernardino de Sahagún was written in Coatepec Nahuatl and Spanish.

Una Canger, analyzing some divergent features of Coatepec Nahuatl, suggests that the variety originates from a historical process of imperfect second language acquisition and has a Guerrero Chontal substrate.
