= Tetelcingo =

Coordinates: 18°52′08″N 98°55′58″W

Tetelcingo is a town in Cuautla, Morelos, Mexico. Located about 6 kilometers north of the city of Cuautla, Tetelcingo and the neighborhoods Colonia Cuauhtémoc and Colonia Lázaro Cárdenas are practically swallowed up in the urban area.

Tetelcingo is the homeland of a variant of the Nahuatl language, Tetelcingo Nahuatl, which is called Mösiehuali by its speakers. There are still (as of 2008) a number of speakers in Tetelcingo and the two colonies, but the language is under intense pressure from the urbanization, and highly endangered.

Tetelcingo was designated to become one of four communities set to become independent municipalities starting January 1, 2019, but authorities of Cuautla objected. The others are Xoxocotla; Coatetelco, and Hueyapan. In an explanatory statement, the state government refers to the Constitution of Mexico, which declares: "Indigenous peoples will be granted identity when dealing with a social, economic and cultural units, settled in a territory and that they recognize their own authorities according to their uses and customs ".

== Customs ==
mosiehuali (in Spanish)

The Mösiehuali language has been conserved in Tetelcingo, and there are many monolingual individuals, even though the language has been lost in many other communities. Some of the women still use the traditional cuieyitl or chincuete (traditional garment).

Other customs and practices are preserved, including the construction of the bescomatl or coscomate (silo) designed to keep rats and squirrels from getting in to eat the stored corn.

== History ==
In 1935, Guillermo C. Townsend of the Instituto Lingüístico de Verano met President Lázaro Cárdenas in Tetelcingo. Dr. Ricardo Pittman began his linguistic studies in Tetelcingo and he wrote several works about Mösiehuali̱, including A Grammar of Tetelcingo (Morelos) Nahuatl, (Pittman, 1954).

An illegal, secret graveyard used by the government was discovered in Tetelcingo December 9, 2014. When the government was compelled to exhume the bodies in 2016, 117 bodies were discovered. Of these, 84 demonstrated signs of violence, including amputations and the removal of internal organs. 34 bodies involved cases that the police had not even bothered to investigate. A similar mass graveyard was later discovered in Jojutla. 30,000 people have "disappeared" in Mexico in the years up to February, 2018.
