= Eastern Peripheral Nahuatl =

- Geographic distribution: Puebla, Isthmus of Tehuantepec, El Salvador
- Linguistic classification: Uto-Aztecan: Aztecan (Nahuan); Nahuatl; Eastern Peripheral Nahuatl
- Subdivisions: Sierra Puebla Nahuatl; ? Tehuacan-Zongolica Nahuatl; Isthmus Nahuatl; Pipil–Tabasco

Language codes
- Glottolog: None

Eastern Peripheral Nahuatl is a group of Nahuatl languages, including the Pipil language of El Salvador and the Nahuatl dialects of the Sierra Norte de Puebla, southern Veracruz, and Tabasco (Isthmus dialects):

- Sierra Puebla Nahuatl
- ?Southeastern Puebla Nahuatl (Tehuacan–Zongolica)
- Isthmus Nahuatl
- Pipil and Tabasco Nahuatl (incl. extinct Northern Chiapas Nahuatl?)

The boundaries of Eastern Nahuatl are not clear. Southeastern Puebla (Tehuacan-Zongolica) is particularly ambiguous. Hasler (1996:164) summarizes the situation,

"Juan Hasler (1958:338) interprets the presence in the region of [a mix of] eastern dialect features and central dialect features as an indication of a substratum of eastern Nahuatl and a superstratum of central Nahuatl. Una Canger (1980:15–20) classifies the region as part of the eastern area, while Yolanda Lastra (1986:189–190) classifies it as part of the central area."
