= Central Nahuatl languages =

Varieties of Nahuatl spoken in central Mexico

Central Nahuatl
- Geographic distribution: Mexico State, Puebla, Guerrero
- Linguistic classification: Uto-Aztecan: Aztecan (Nahuan); Nahuatl; Central Nahuatl
- Subdivisions: Nuclear Nahuatl; Puebla–Tlaxcala; Xochiltepec–Huatlatlauca; ? Southeastern Puebla; Northern Guerrero; Southern Guerrero

Language codes
- Glottolog: None cent2258 (partial match)

Central Nahuatl is a group of Nahuatl languages of central Mexico, in the regions of central Puebla, Tlaxcala, central Veracruz, Morelos, Mexico State, and Guerrero.

- Nuclear: Classical Nahuatl, Morelos Nahuatl, Tetelcingo Nahuatl
- Tlaxcala-Puebla Nahuatl (border of Puebla and Tlaxcala) and its descendant Southern Coahuila Nahuatl
- Central Puebla Nahuatl (Xochiltepec–Huatlatlauca, south of the city of Puebla)
- ? Southeastern Puebla (see for classification)
- Guerrero Nahuatl (Northern/Central Guerrero, Balsas River region)
- Ometepec Nahuatl (Southern Guerrero)
