= Mfumte language =

Eastern Grassfields language of Cameroon

Mfumte
- Region: Cameroon
- Ethnicity: Mfumte
- Native speakers: (24,700 Mfumte dialect cited 1982); 6,000 Kwaja and Ndaktup (2000), unknown number Fum
- Language family: Niger–Congo?: Atlantic–Congo; Benue–Congo; Southern Bantoid; Grassfields; Eastern; Nkambe; Mfumte

Language codes
- ISO 639-3: Variously: nfu – Mfumte fum – Fum kdz – Kwaja (East Mfumte)
- Glottolog: mfum1239 Mfumteic fumm1238 Fum

Mfumte (Nfumte) is a Grassfields Bantu language of Cameroon. It is not clear if the four varieties spoken by ethnic Mfumte—Ndaktup, Kwaja, Fum and Mfumte proper—are mutually intelligible or distinct languages; ability to communicate may be either due to inherent intelligibility or to bilingualism, while Fum and Mfumte may simply be the Nigerian and Cameroonian names for the same language.

== Orthography ==
The Mfumte alphabet has 40 letters, with 30 consonants and 10 vowels.

=== Alphabet ===
Mfumte alphabet
Capital	Lowercase	IPA	
Capital	Lowercase	Phoneme	Allophones
A	a	/a/	[a]
B	b	/b/	[b]
Ch	ch	/t͡ʃ/	[t͡ʃ]
D	d	/d/	[d]
Dz	dz	/d͡z/	[d͡z]
E	e	/e/	[e], [ɛ]
Ə	ə	/ə/	[ə]
F	f	/f/	[f]
G	g	/ɡ/	[ɡ]
Gb	gb	/ɡb/	[ɡb]
Gh	gh	/ɣ/	[ɣ]
H	h	/h/	[h]
’	’	/h/	[ʔ]
I	i	/i/	[i]
Ɨ	ɨ	/ɯ/	[ɯ]
J	j	/d͡ʒ/	[d͡ʒ]
K	k	/k/	[k]
Kp	kp	/kp/	[kp]
L	l	/l/	[l]
M	m	/m/	[m]
N	n	/n/	[n]
Ny	ny	/ɲ/	[ɲ]
Ŋ	ŋ	/ŋ/	[ŋ]
O	o	/o/	[o]
Ɔ	ɔ	/ɔ/	[ɔ]
Ø	ø	/ø/	[ø]
P	p	/p/	[p]
R	r	/ɾ/	[ɾ]
S	s	/s/	[s]
Sh	sh	/ʃ/	[ʃ]
T	t	/t/	[t]
Ts	ts	/t͡s/	[t͡s]
U	u	/u/	[u]
Ʉ	ʉ	/y/	[y]
V	v	/v/	[v]
W	w	/w/	[w]
Wy	wy	/ɥ/	[ɥ]
Y	y	/j/	[j]
Z	z	/z/	[z]
Zh	zh	/ʒ/	[ʒ]

=== Multigraphs ===
In addition to the single phonemes, Mfumte has prenasalized, palatalized, labio-palatalized, labialized, and velarized consonants.

Mfumte multigraphs
Capital	Lowercase	IPA
Mp	mp	/ᵐp/
Mb	mb	/ᵐb/
Nt	nt	/ⁿt/
Nd	nd	/ⁿd/
Nk	nk	/ᵑk/
Ng	ng	/ᵑɡ/
Nkp	nkp	/ᵑᵐkp/
Ngb	ngb	/ᵑᵐɡb/
Nts	nts	/ⁿt͡s/
Ndz	ndz	/ⁿd͡z/
Nj	nj	/ⁿd͡ʒ/
Mf	mf	/ᶬf/
Mv	mv	/ᶬv/
Ns	ns	/ⁿs/
Nsh	nsh	/ⁿʃ/
Ngh	ngh	/ᵑɣ/
Nh	nh	/ᵑh/
Py	py	/pʲ/
By	by	/bʲ/
Ky	ky	/kʲ/
Gy	gy	/ɡʲ/
Hy	hy	/hʲ/
Mpy	mpy	/ᵐpʲ/
Mby	mby	/ᵐbʲ/
Nky	nky	/ᵑkʲ/
Ngy	ngy	/ᵑɡʲ/
Mfy	mfy	/ᶬfʲ/
Nghy	nghy	/ᵑɣʲ/
Nhy	nhy	/ᵑhʲ/
Hwy	hwy	/hᶣ/
Nhwy	nhwy	/ᵑhᶣ/
Nghwy	nghwy	/ᵑɣᶣ/
Pw	pw	/pʷ/
Bw	bw	/bʷ/
Kw	kw	/kʷ/
Gw	gw	/ɡʷ/
Fw	fw	/fʷ/
Hw	hw	/hʷ/
Nyw	nyw	/ɲʷ/
Nw	nw	/nʷ/
Mpw	mpw	/ᵐpʷ/
Mbw	mbw	/ᵐbʷ/
Nkw	nkw	/ᵑkʷ/
Ngw	ngw	/ᵑɡʷ/
Nghw	nghw	/ᵑɣʷ/
Nhw	nhw	/ᵑhʷ/
