= Nyika language =

Bantu language spoken in Tanzania and Zambia

Nyika
- Kinyika, Kinyiha
- Native to: Tanzania, Zambia, Malawi
- Native speakers: 35,000 (2007)
- Language family: Niger–Congo?: Atlantic–Congo; Benue–Congo; Bantoid; Bantu; Rukwa; Mbozi; Mwika; Nyika

Language codes
- ISO 639-3: Either: nkt – (Tanzania) nkv – (Malawi, Zambia)
- Glottolog: nyik1247 Tanzania nyik1246 Malawi & Zambia

Nyika (Nyiha) is a Bantu language of Tanzania and Zambia.
