= Pochutec language =

Extinct Nahuan language

Pochutec
- Pochutla
- Naguál, nawal
- Native to: Mexico
- Region: Pochutla, Oaxaca
- Extinct: late 20th century
- Language family: Uto-Aztecan: Southern Uto-Aztecan; Nahuan; Pochutec
- Writing system: Latin

Language codes
- ISO 639-3: xpo
- Glottolog: poch1244

Pochutec is an extinct Uto-Aztecan language of the Nahuan (or Aztecan) branch which was spoken in and around the town of Pochutla on the Pacific coast of Oaxaca, Mexico. In the era of the Spanish conquest, it was also spoken in Tonameca and Huatulco. In 1917, it was documented in a monograph by Franz Boas, who considered the language nearly extinct. In the 1970s, another investigator found two speakers around Pochutla who still remembered a few of the words recorded by Boas.

== Classification ==
In the early 20th century, scholars disagreed as to the origin of the language within the Nahuan family. Most thought Pochutec was distinct from Nahuatl, and this was proven in 1978, when Campbell and Langacker gave new arguments from Boas' data. Their conclusion was quickly accepted. Nahuan thus consists of Pochutec and "General Aztec", which consists of Nahuatl and Pipil.

Bartholomew (1980) suggests that some of the divergent traits, for example last syllable stress, are due to influence from Chatino, an Oto-Manguean language. She argues that at the time of the 16th century Spanish conquest of the Aztec Empire the settlement of Pochutla did not fall under the Aztec Empire's domain, but instead was part of the Mixtec state centered at Tututepec. Thus, the Chatino linguistic influences stemmed from the trade and communication routes between Pochutla and Tututepec passing through Chatino territory.

Dakin (1983) argues that the key correspondence sets used by Campbell and Langacker as evidence for the existence of a separate fifth vowel *ï evolving from pUA *u, their main basis for separating Pochutec from their "General Aztec", were actually later developments within Pochutec by which proto-Aztec *i and *e > o in closed syllables, and that the supposed contrast in final position in imperatives originally had had a following clitic. In a later article, Canger and Dakin (1985) identify a different, very systematic isogloss for the development of pUA *u that shows a basic split between Eastern Nahuatl dialects and the Central and Western periphery, including Pochutec, as exemplified in at least eight different cognate sets. This proposal is incompatible with Campbell and Langacker's proposal for the development of pUA *u. Dakin thus classifies Pochutec as belonging to the Western branch of the Nahuan languages, rather than having split off from Nahuan before the basic East-West split.

== Morphology ==
Pochutec is an agglutinative language, where words use suffix complexes for a variety of purposes with several morphemes strung together.

== Example phrases ==
The following are sample phrases in Pochutec, accompanied by Spanish and English translations:

Sample phrases with Spanish and English translations
Original phrase	Spanish translation	English translation
Nen ca igüén natacoztúc.	"Estoy platicando con él."	"I am talking with him."
Quet túchi nochán.	"Mi casa es pequeña."	"My house is small."
Açóc tachóm unyóc nebá.	"Aquí hay muchos perros."	"There are many dogs here."
Ma quet iténc apázt.	"Está debajo de la olla."	"It is under the pot."
¿Quem tpenúc na atén?	"¿Cómo pasaste el río?"	"How did you cross the river?"
Az nuí Uetúl ámpa ayagó tumín.	"No me voy a Huatulco porque no hay dinero."	"I'm not going to Huatulco because there's no money."
Iná coneból quixíc itecú.	"Este muchacho es parecido a su padre."	"This boy looks like his father."

== Bibliography ==
IJAL = International Journal of American Linguistics

- Bartholomew, Doris. 1980. Otomanguean influence on Pochutla Aztec. IJAL 46.2
- Boas, Franz. 1917. El dialecto mexicano de Pochutla, Oaxaca. IJAL, 1:9-44.
- Campbell, Lyle, and Ronald W. Langacker. 1978. Proto-Aztecan vowels: Part I. IJAL, April 1978, 44(2):85-102.
- Canger, Una. 1980. Five Studies Inspired by Nahuatl Verbs in -oa. Travaux du Cercle Linguistique de Copenhague no. 11. Copenhagen.
- Canger, Una. 1988. Nahuatl Dialectology: A Survey and Some Suggestions. IJAL, January 1988, 54(1):28-72.
- Canger, Una. 2000. Stress in Nahuatl of Durango: whose stress?. In Eugene H. Casad and Thomas L. Willett, eds. Uto-Aztecan: structural, temporal, and geographic perspectives: papers in memory of Wick R. Miller. Hermosillo, Mexico: UniSon (Universidad de Sonora, División de Humanidades y Bellas Artes). pp. 373–386.
- Canger, Una, and Karen Dakin. 1985. "An inconspicuous basic split in Nahuatl". International Journal of American Linguistics. 54. 258-261.
- Dakin, Karen. 1983. Proto-Aztecan Vowels and Pochutec: An Alternative Analysis. International Journal of American Linguistics 49.2.196-203.
- Hasler, Juan. 1976. “La situación dialectológica del pochuteco", International Journal of American Linguistics 42. 3. 268-273.
- Hasler, Juan. 1977. “El pochuteco en la dialectología nahua", Amerindia. 2. 47-70.
- Instituto Nacional de Lenguas Indigenas (INALI) [National Institute of Indigenous Languages, Mexico]. 14 January 2008. Catálogo de las Lenguas Indígenas Nacionales: Variantes Lingüísticas de México con sus autodenominaciones y referencias geoestadísticas. [Catalog of the Indigenous Languages: Language variants of Mexico with their self-designations and geostatistical references]
- Knab, Tim. 1980. When Is a Language Really Dead: The Case of Pochutec. IJAL, July 1980, 46(3):230-233
- Lastra, Yolanda. 1992. The present-day indigenous languages of Mexico: an overview. International journal of the sociology of language, 96:35-43 (available through a subscription database).
- Peralta Ramírez, Valentín. 2005. El Nawat de la Costa del Golfo. Algunas Semejanzas y Diferencias Estructurales con el Náhuatl Central.
