= Temascaltepec Nahuatl =

Endangered Aztecan language of Mexico

- San Mateo Almomoloa; Temazcaltepēc nāhuatlahtōlli
- Native to: central Mexico
- Region: Temascaltepec
- Native speakers: (310 cited 1990 census)
- Language family: Uto-Aztecan: Aztecan (Nahuan); Nahuatl; Western Peripheral Nahuatl; Western Mexico State; Temascaltepec Nahuatl

Language codes
- ISO 639-3: nhv
- Glottolog: tema1239

Temascaltepec Nahuatl (a.k.a. Almomoloa Nahuatl) is an endangered variety of Nahuatl of western Mexico State spoken by 300 people. It is about 50% intelligible with its closest relatives.
