= Mecayapan =

Municipality and city in the Mexican state of Veracruz

- City and municipality
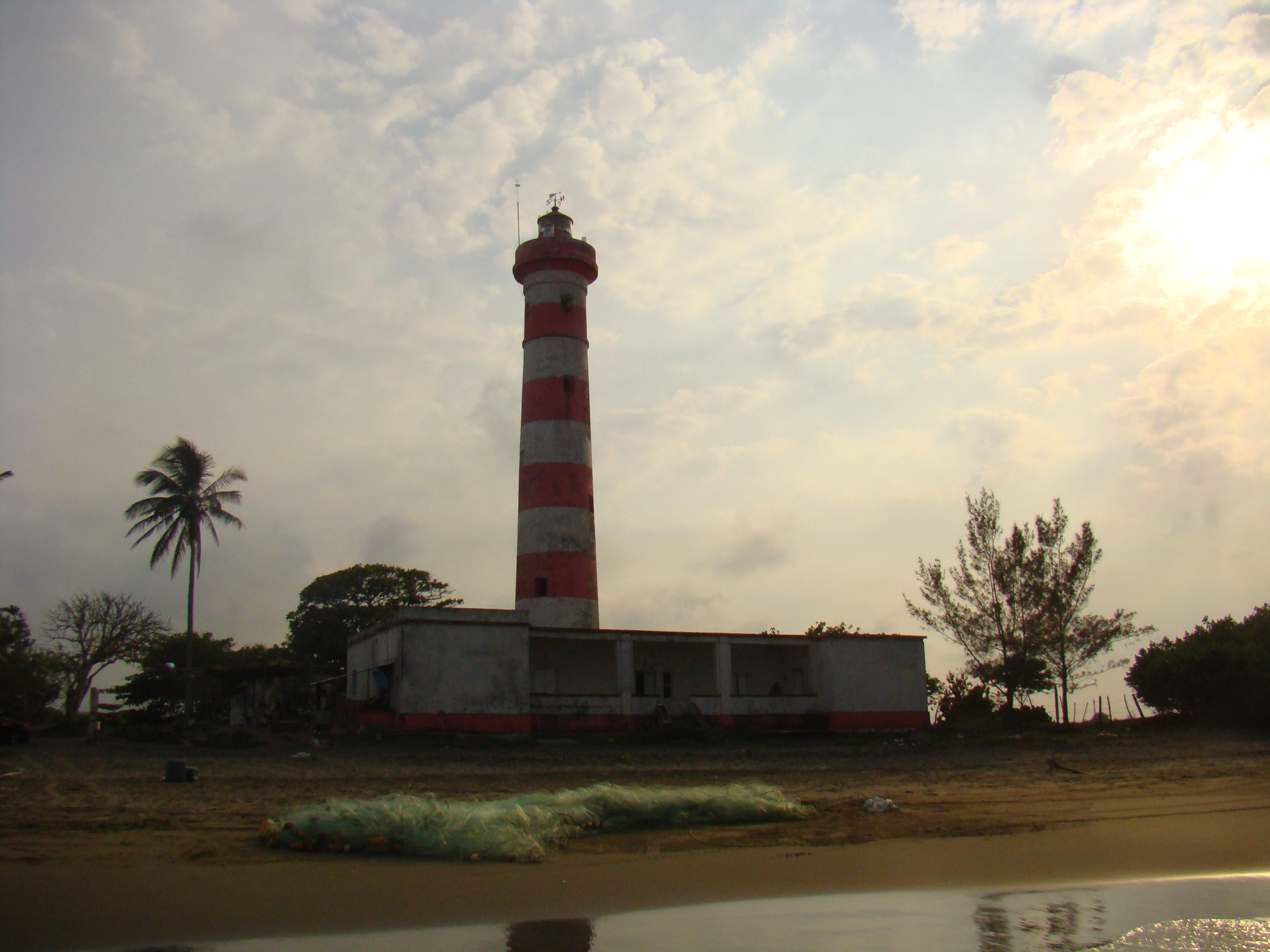
- Lighthouse in Mecayapan

- Location in Veracruz Mecayapan (Mexico)
- Coordinates: 18°13′N 94°50′W
- Country: Mexico
- State: Veracruz
- Region: Olmeca Region

Area
  - Total: 315 km^{2} (122 sq mi)
- Elevation: 1,230 m (4,040 ft)

Population (2020)
  - Total: 13,633
  - Seat: 5,770

Mecayapan is a municipality and city in the Mexican state of Veracruz. It is located in the south-east zone of the State, about 428 km from the state capital Xalapa. It has a surface of 523.96 km^{2}. It is located at 18°13′N 94°50′W.

== Geography ==
The municipality of Mecayapan is delimited to the north by Gulf of Mexico to the east by Pajapan, to the south by Chinameca and to the west by Soteapan State.

=== Climate ===
The weather in Mecayapan is warm all year with rains in summer and autumn.

== Economy ==
It produces principally maize, beans and green chile.

== Culture ==
In Mecayapan, the celebration in honor to Santo Santiago Jacobo, the patron saint of the town, is held every May.
