= Ngoni language =

Ngoni language may refer to any language spoken by the Ngoni people.

Principally, these are:

- Ngoni language (Tanzania)
- Ngoni language (Mozambique)
- Ngoni dialect of Zulu (Zambia and Malawi)
- Ngoni dialect of Nyanja (Malawi)
- Ngoni dialect of Tumbuka
