= Nauna language =

Oceanic language

Nauna
- Naune
- Native to: Papua New Guinea
- Region: Nauna Island, Manus Province
- Native speakers: (420 cited 2000)
- Language family: Austronesian: Malayo-Polynesian; Oceanic; Admiralty Islands; Eastern Admiralty Islands; Southeastern islands; Nauna

Language codes
- ISO 639-3: ncn
- Glottolog: naun1237
- ELP: Nauna
- Nauna is classified as Severely Endangered by the UNESCO Atlas of the World's Languages in Danger.
- Coordinates: 2.211239°S 148.198706°E

Nauna, or Naune, is an Oceanic language spoken in the single village of Nauna (2.211239°S 148.198706°E) on Nauna Island in Rapatona Rural LLG, Manus Province, Papua New Guinea.
