= Mexicaneros =

Ethnic group in Mexico

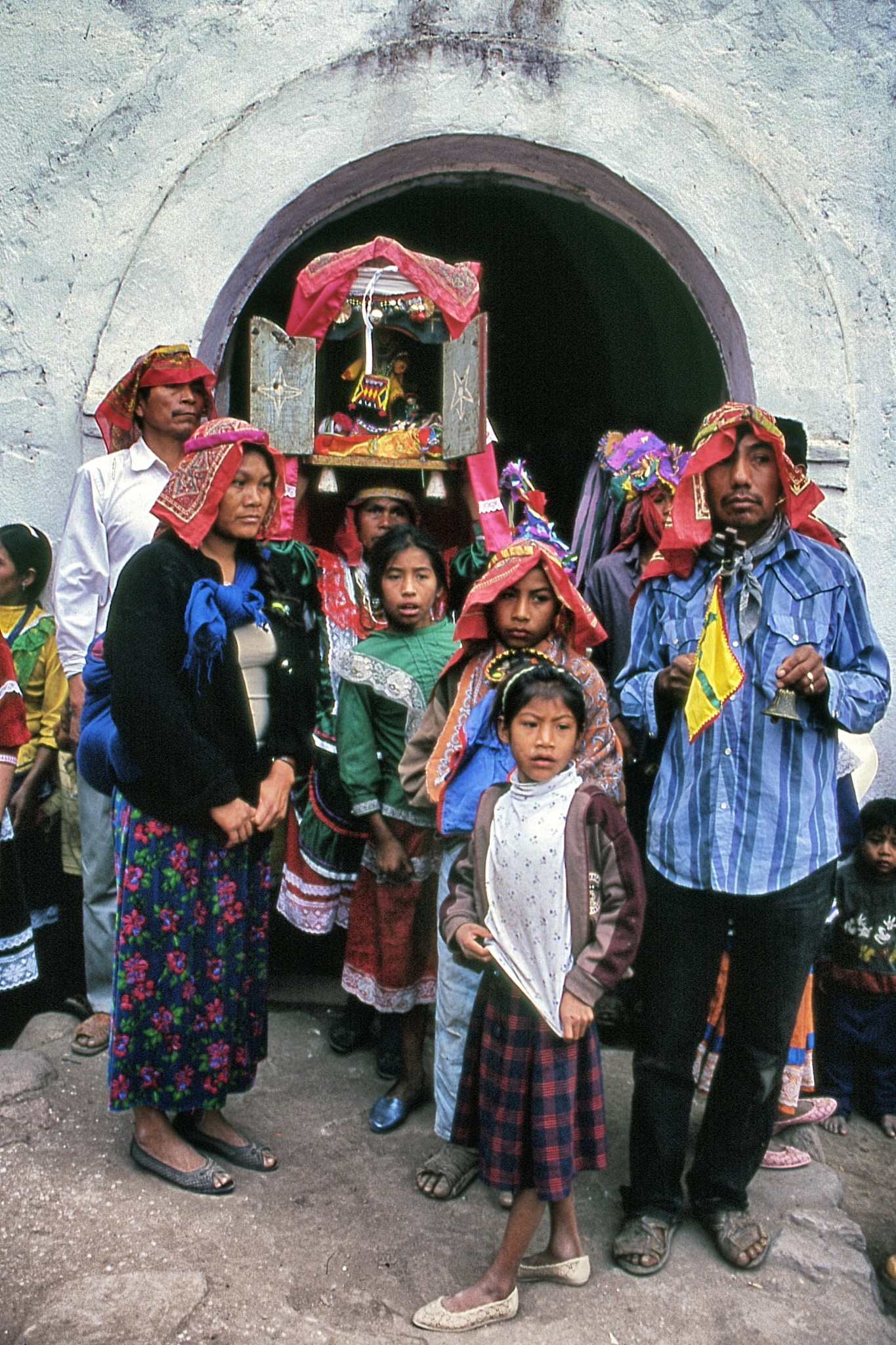
Procession on Roman Catholic Candlemas of self-identify as Mexicaneros people in San Pedro Xícoras town, Durango, northern Mexico

Mexicaneros are an Indigenous people from between west and northern Mexico, in the Durango and Nayarit borders. They are one of 62 indigenous cultures of Mexico. They speak the eponymous Mexicanero language, which is related to Nahuatl. They lived far from the Aztec Empire. Some 1,300 individuals spoke the Mexicanero language as of 2011.

== Distribution ==
They live in Mezquital Municipality, Durango (settlements of Agua Caliente, Agua Fría, Bancos de Calitique, Berenjén (Tepetates II), Combustita, Curachitos (Buena Vista), Chalatita, Chalchihuites, El Catorce, El Durazno (Duraznitos), El Rincón, El Toro, Escalera, Guajolote, Huazamotita, La Cañada, La Estancia, La Guajolota, La Tinaja, Las Campanas, Las Cruces, Las Norias, Las Pilas, Llano de Jacalitos (Jacalitos), Los Alacranes, Los Arquitos, Los Charcos, Los Crucitos, Los Espejos, Los Gavilanes, Los Leones, Mesa de los Lobos (Lobitos), Metatita, Nuevo León, Pino Real, San Antonio de Padua, San Bernabé, San Buenaventura, San Diego, San Francisco del Mezquital (El Mezquital), San Pedro Xícoras [San Pedro Jícoras], Santa María de Ocotán, Techalote (Buenavista), Tepalcates, Tortillas, and Yerbaniz) and Acaponeta (settlements of Acaponeta, Agua Tendida, Buenavista (Las Paredes), El Duraznito, El Naranjo, El Resbalón, Huanacaxtle, La Guásima, La Laguna (La Lagunita), La Paloma Nueva Reforma, Mesa las Arpas, Paredes, Rancho los López, Rancho de Ernesto Aguilar, San Diego de Alcalá, San Diego el Naranjo, San Dieguito de Abajo, San José de Gracia, Santa Cruz, Saycota, Sayulilla, Unidad Habitacional, and Zacatecas) and El Nayar (settlements of Dolores, Los Chapiles, Santa Teresa, and Tierras Cuevas) municipalities in Nayarit.

== History ==
No ancient documents nor codex describe them. Hypotheses claim that they lived in the region in the pre-Columbian era. Other hypothesis state that the Spanish settled Nahua people there to support colonization, and that they were a wandering Aztec people, or that they were Caxcans who were settled in their regions by the Spanish and that their Nahuan dialect mixed with Spanish language was the Caxcan language and that they adopted Nahuatl during the Spanish colonial era. Mexicanero people have their own religion related to Aztec religion. Few syncretized this culture with Roman Catholicism.
