= Cosoleacaque =

Municipality in Veracruz, Mexico

- Municipality
- Coat of arms

- Location in Mexico Cosoleacaque (Mexico)
- Country: Mexico
- State: Veracruz

Government
  - Federal electoral district: Veracruz's 3rd
- Demonym: (in Spanish)
- Time zone: UTC-6 (Zona Centro)

Cosoleacaque is a municipality in the Mexican state of Veracruz. It is located in the south-east zone of the state, about 300 km (190 mi) from the state capital Xalapa. It has a surface of 234.42 km^{2} (90.51 sq mi). It is located at 18°00′N 94°38′W.

== Geography ==
Cosoleacaque borders to the north on Coatzacoalcos and Pajapan, to the south on Minatitlán, to the east on Ixhuatlán del Sureste and Nanchital and to the west on Chinameca.

The weather is warm all year with rains in summer and autumn. Cosoleacaque's main products are maize and rice.

== Culture ==
Cosoleacaque has a celebration in honor of Santa Cruz, patron of the town.

== Transportation ==
Minatitlán/Coatzacoalcos International Airport is located in Cosoleacaque.

== History ==
=== Recent events ===
Former mayor Gladys Merlín Castro (PRI, 2008-2010) and her daughter, Carla Enríquez Merlín, were shot and killed outside their home in Barrio Segundo on February 16, 2021.

As of March 5, 2021, 577 confirmed cases and 130 deaths associated with the COVID-19 pandemic in Mexico had been reported.
