= Sierra Negra =

Extinct volcano located in the Mexican state of Puebla

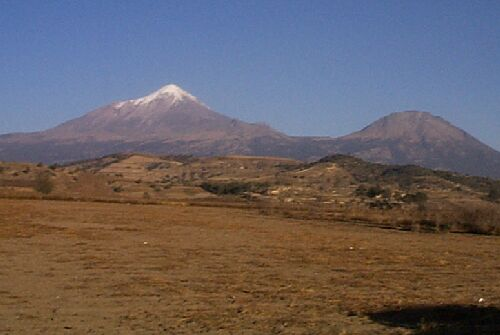
- Pico de Orizaba and Sierra Negra viewed from the west, near Ciudad Serdán

Highest point
- Elevation: 4,580 m (15,030 ft)
- Prominence: 540 m (1,770 ft)
- Coordinates: 18°59′N 97°19′W

Geography
- Location within Puebla (state) Location within Mexico
- Location: Chalchicomula de Sesma, Puebla, Mexico

Geology
- Mountain type: Stratovolcano
- Volcanic belt: Trans-Mexican Volcanic Belt

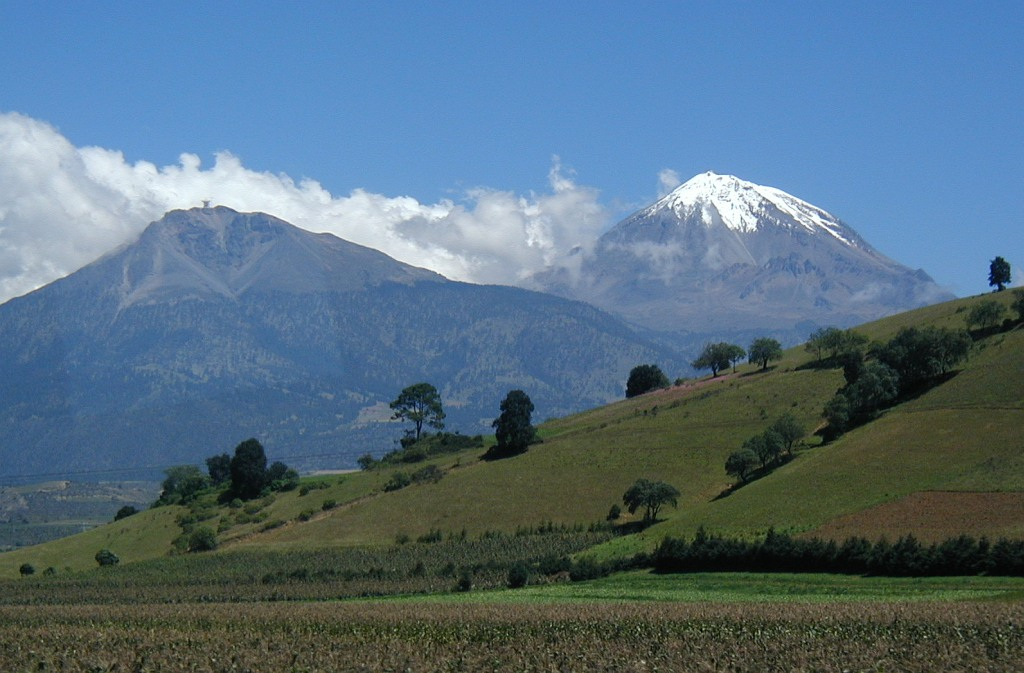
Sierra Negra and Pico de Orizaba (viewed from the south)

Sierra Negra (also, and perhaps more properly, Cerro La Negra) is an extinct volcano located in the Mexican state of Puebla, close to the border with Veracruz. At officially 4,580 metres (15,030 ft) above sea level, it is the fifth-highest peak in Mexico. Sierra Negra is overshadowed by nearby Pico de Orizaba (5,610 m/18,406 ft).

== Overview ==
Sierra Negra is located within the Pico de Orizaba National Park. The mountain is the site for two of the world's premier astronomical instruments, the Large Millimeter Telescope and the High Altitude Water Cherenkov Observatory. Therefore, the access to the mountain is restricted and has to be applied for at least a week in advance. The service road for this facility is claimed to be the highest road in North America. A part of the telescope facility is visible as a white dot in the first picture below and more clearly in the second picture.

The Spanish word sierra is usually applied to mountain ranges or ridges. However, a few mountains were given the name sierra after the Conquest, like Sierra de Tlaxcala or Sierra de Tolocan (now outdated names for Malinche and Nevado de Toluca, respectively). As listed by the Mexican geographical institute INEGI, the official name for the Sierra Negra ("Black Mountains") is Cerro La Negra ("Black Lady Hill"), although the latter is largely unused in common speech. The Nahuatl names Tliltépetl ("Black Mountain") or Atlitzin ("Our Lord (or Lady) of the Waters") are sometimes attached. Speakers of Orizaba Nahuatl call the mountain Iztactepetl Icni ("Sibling of the White Mountain"; the "White Mountain" being the Pico de Orizaba).

The mountain range to the east of the city of Tehuacán (south of but still in sight of the Pico de Orizaba), with such principal towns as Zoquitlán and Coyomeapan, is also known as the "Sierra Negra", which (unsurprisingly) can cause confusion.

== See also ==
- List of mountain peaks of Mexico
- List of the highest major summits of North America
- Trans-Mexican Volcanic Belt
- National Institute of Astrophysics, Optics and Electronics
- List of national parks of Mexico
