= Pajapan =

Municipality and city in the Mexican state of Veracruz

- City and municipality
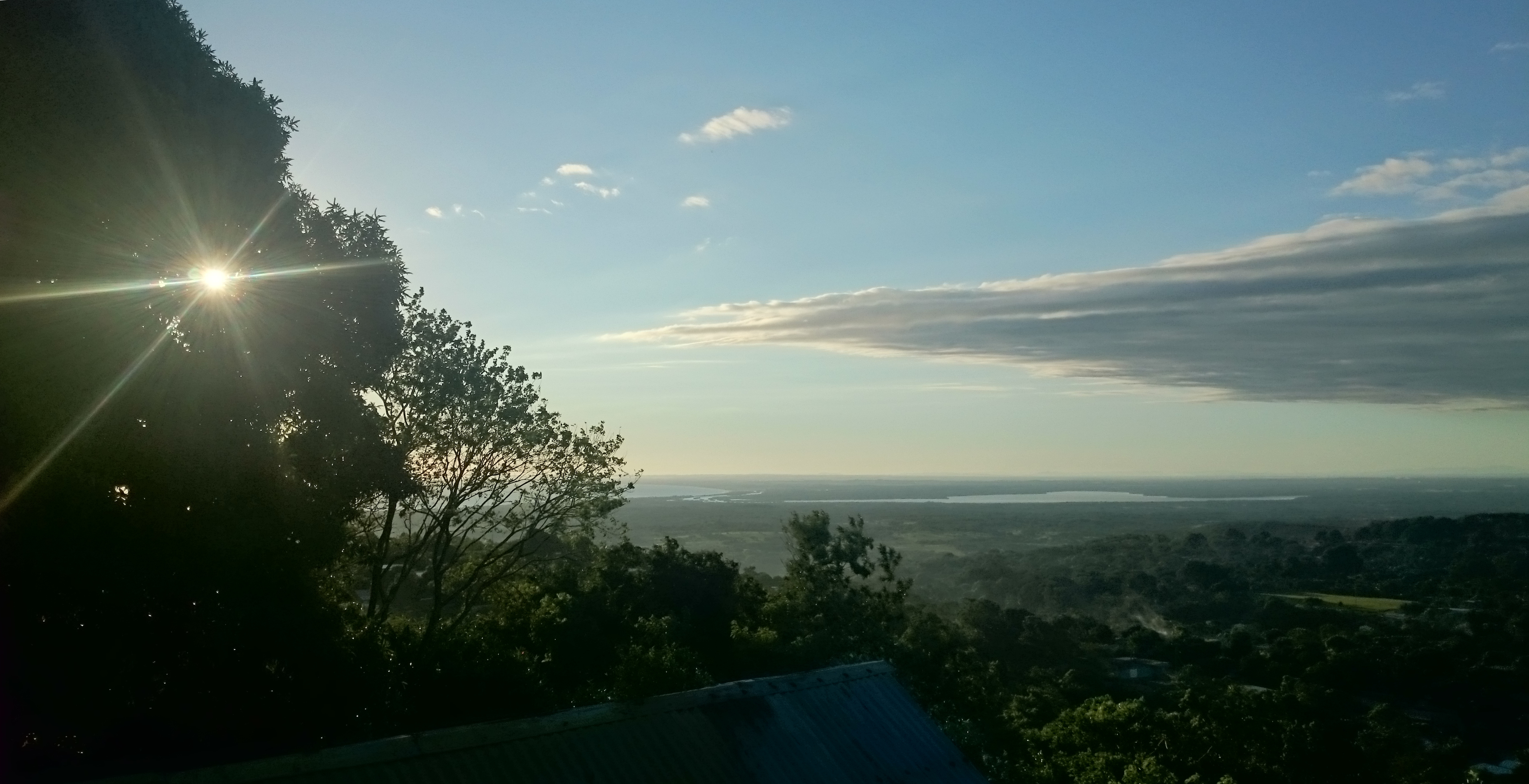
- Amanecer en Pajapan

- Location in Veracruz Pajapan (Mexico)
- Coordinates: 18°15′46″N 94°41′30″W
- Country: Mexico
- State: Veracruz
- Region: Olmeca Region

Area
  - Total: 311 km^{2} (120 sq mi)
- Elevation: 185 m (607 ft)

Population (2020)
  - Total: 18,051
  - Seat: 10,156

Pajapan is a municipality and city in the Mexican state of Veracruz. It is located in the south zone of the state of Veracruz, about 496 km (308 mi) from the state capital of Xalapa. It has a surface of 305.98 km^{2} (118.14 sq mi), and is located at 18°16′N 94°41′W.

== Geography ==
The municipality of Pajapan is delimited to the north by Mecayapan to the east by the Gulf of Mexico and Coatzacoalcos, to the south by Chinameca and Cosoleacaque and to the west by Mecayapan. By decree of June 22, 1889, the limits were established between the municipalities of Mecayapan and Pajapan. By a decree of October 6, 1898, Pajapan was annexed as a community within the municipality of Minzapan.

The weather in Pajapan is warm all year with rains in summer and autumn.

== Agriculture ==
It produces principally maize, beans, rice, watermelon, mango and orange fruit.

== Celebrations ==
In May a celebration takes place in honor of San Juan de Dios, patron of the town.
