= Ometepec Náhuatl =

Central Nahuatl language of Mexico

Ometepec Nahuatl
- Southern Guerrero Nahuatl
- Native to: Mexico
- Region: Guerrero, Oaxaca
- Native speakers: (430 cited 1990 census)
- Language family: Uto-Aztecan: Aztecan (Nahuan); Nahuatl; Central Nahuatl; Ometepec Nahuatl
- Dialects: 3 divergent dialects

Language codes
- ISO 639-3: nht
- Glottolog: omet1237

Ometepec Nahuatl, also known as Southern Guerrero Nahuatl, is one of the Central Nahuatl languages of south-central Mexico. The dialects of the three areas where Ometepec Nahuatl is spoken are distinct enough to potentially be considered separate languages.
