= Una Canger =

Danish linguist

Una Canger (née Una Rasmussen; born May 14, 1938) is a Danish linguist specializing in languages of Mesoamerica. She has published mostly about the Nahuatl language with a particular focus on the dialectology of Modern Nahuatl, and is considered among the world's leading specialists in this area. She held tenure at the University of Copenhagen, leading the department for Native American Languages and Cultures until she reached the age of 70 in 2008 and was forced into retirement. In 2012 she was awarded the Order of the Aztec Eagle for her contributions to the study of Mexican culture. In 2005 she received the teaching prize of Copenhagen University, the Harald.

Daughter of the famous Danish architect Steen Eiler Rasmussen, she was admitted as the first female student in the department of Linguistics at the University of Copenhagen, where she became interested the theories of Louis Hjelmslev. She received her PhD from Berkeley in 1968, her thesis being a glossematic grammar of the Mayan language Mam. She worked with Mayan languages for a while, particularly Mam, Teco, and Lacandón. After being offered a position at the University of Copenhagen, she began studying Classical Nahuatl, leading to her later descriptive and dialectological work on modern Nahuatl. She also has 4 children, and several grandchildren, one of whom is the Danish actor “Sylvester Canger”.

== Bibliography ==
- 1980. Five Studies inspired by nahuatl Verbs in -oa. Travaux du Cercle Linguistique de Copenhague 19. Copenhagen: .
- 1985. w. Dakin, Karen. An inconspicuous basic split in Nahuatl. International Journal of American Linguistics [IJAL] 51. 358–361.
- 1988. Another look at Nahuatl -āškā ‘possession’. IJAL 54.2. 232–235.
- 1988. Nahuatl dialectology: A survey and some suggestions. IJAL 54.1. 28–72.
- 1988. Subgrupos de los dialectos nahuas. Smoke and Mist: Mesoamerican Studies in Memory of Thelma D. Sullivan. Ed. by J. Kathryn Josserand and Karen Dakin, eds.. 473–498. Oxford: BAR International Series 402. Part ii.
- 1992. Copenhagen Nahuatl Dictionary Project. Description and Manual. 85s. Inst. for Religionshistorie, København
- 1993. In tequil de morrales. El trabajo de morrales. 135 s. C.A. Reitzels Boghandel A/S, København.
- 1994. Fieldwork and Field Methods. in: The Encyclopedia of Language and Linguistics s. 1219–1221. R.E. Asher. Pergamon Press, Oxford-New York-Seoul-Tokyo
- 1996. Is there a passive in nahuatl. in: Content, expression and structure: studies in Danish functional grammar s. 1–15. Engberg-Pedersen, Elisabeth, et al. John Benjamin's Publishing Co., Amsterdam
- 2000. Review: J. Lockhart, C.M. Stafford Poole & Lisa Sousa (eds. and translators): The Story of Guadalupe. C.M. Stafford Poole: Our Lady of Guadalupe. Tidsskriftet Antropologi 41, s. 122–123.
- 2000. Stress in Nahuatl of Durango. Whose Stress? in: Uto-Aztecan: Structural, Temporal, and Geographic Perspectives s. 373–386. E.H. Casad & T.L. Willett. Universidad de Sonora, Hermosillo, Sonora, Mexico
- 2001. Mexicanero de la Sierra Madre Occidental. Archivo de Lenguas Indígenas de México 180 s. El Colegio de México, Mexico
- 2001. Le rôle de Francis Whitfield. in: Louis Hjelmslev a cent´anni dalla nascita s. 229–243. Romeo Galassi & Margherita De Michiel. Imprimitur, Padova, Italien
- In Tequil de Morrales. Working with maguey., C.A. Reitzels Boghandel A/S, København 1993.
- 2002. An Interactive Dictionary and Text Corpus for Seventeenth-Century Nahuatl. in: Making Dictionaries. Preserving Indigenous Languages of the Americas s. 195–218. William Frawley, Kenneth C. Hill, Pamela Munro. University of California Press, Berkeley, Los Angeles, London
