= Tabasco Nahuatl =

Nahuan language spoken in Tabasco

- Nawat
- Native to: Mexico
- Region: Tabasco
- Native speakers: 30 (2014)
- Language family: Uto-Aztecan: Aztecan (Nahuan); Nahuatl; Eastern Nahuatl; Pipil–Tabasco; Tabasco Nahuatl

Language codes
- ISO 639-3: nhc
- Glottolog: taba1265

Tabasco Nahuatl or Nawat of Tabasco is a moribund Nahuan language spoken in Cupilco in the Mexican state of Tabasco.

The language belongs to the eastern branch of the Nahuan language family, and exhibits a number of divergent features.

== Phonology ==
=== Consonants ===
Consonant phonemes
		Labial	Dental/ Alveolar	Alveopalatal	Velar	Glottal
Plosive	Voiceless	p	t		k	
Plosive	Voiced	bʷ				
Affricate			ts	tɕ		
Fricative			s	ɕ		h
Nasal		m	n	ɲ		
Tap			ɾ			
Approximant		w	l	j		

- /p/ becomes [b] between two i's, e.g., suwapipil [suwapibil] 'girls'.
- /t/ is dental [t̪]. It becomes [d̪] between vowels in rapid speech, e.g., nitati [nid̪at̪i] 'I burn'.
- /k/ becomes [g] initially, between vowels, and after nasals, e.g., kahli [gahli] 'house'
- /ts/ is dental [t̪s̪].
- /s/ is alveolar.
- /n/ is alveolar but becomes [ŋ] word-finally and before /k/.
- /ɲ/ is alveopalatal [n̠ʲ].
- Spanish loanwords include sounds such as [b], [g], [f], [r].

=== Vowels ===
Vowel phonemes
	Front	Central	Back
Close	i		u
Mid	e		o
Open		a	

- /o/ is not common but contasts with /u/, e.g., koit 'stick', xuit 'year'. It also appears in loans from Ayapa Zoque, e.g., ooyo 'shrimp' from óʼyok 'shrimp'.

Vowel length is contrastive, e.g., istat 'salt', istaat 'cotton'.

== Orthography ==
García de León G. uses the following orthography in his 1967 work.

Orthography
Grapheme	IPA
p	/p/
t	/t/
ts	/ts/
ch	/tɕ/
k	/k/
bw	/bʷ/
s	/s/
x	/ɕ/
h	/h/
m	/m/
n	/n/
ñ	/ɲ/
l	/l/
r	/ɾ/
w	/w/
y	/j/
i	/i/
e	/e/
a	/a/
o	/o/
u	/u/

== Sample text ==
Tabasco Nahuatl text
Tabasco Nahuatl	Literal translation	Spanish	English
en akél tiempo ibwak neemía nii chi tiopan tuguhkulwan... ginei pixtiwapa ienemigo tiopan... te ginei pa chichti pa unu tiopan iwaan tuguhkulwan yaha neeha pa teiti...	En aquel tiempo cuando andaban haciendo iglesia nuestros-abuelos... lo querían destruir su-enemigo iglesia... no lo-quería brujo que hay iglesia y nuestros-abuelos andar trabajando	En aquel tiempo, cuando andaban haciendo la iglesia nuestros abuelos, sus enemigos querían destruirla. Los brujos no querían que hubiera iglesia y nuestros abuelos seguían trabajando.	At that time, when our grandparents were building the church, their enemies wanted to destroy it. The sorcerers didn't want a church, but our grandparents kept working.
