= Tehuacan–Zongolica Nahuatl =

Nahuatl variety of Mexico

- Southeastern Puebla Nahuatl
- nawatlajtoli
- Native to: Mexico
- Region: Puebla, Veracruz
- Native speakers: (260,000 cited 1991–2006)
- Language family: Uto-Aztecan: Aztecan (Nahuan); Nahuatl; Central or Eastern Nahuatl; Tehuacan–Zongolica Nahuatl

Language codes
- ISO 639-3: Variously: nhq – Huaxcaleca npl – Southeastern Puebla nsu – Sierra Negra nlv – Orizaba Nahuatl (Zongolica) nhz – Santa María la Alta nhy – Northern Oaxaca
- Glottolog: huax1236 Huaxcaleca nort2958 N. Oaxaca

Tehuacan–Zongolica a.k.a. Southeastern Puebla Nahuatl is a variety of Nahuatl spoken by ethnic Nahua people in southeastern Puebla state (Tehuacan) and southern Veracruz (Zongolica) in Mexico.

Tehuacan–Zongolica has characteristics of both Central Nahuatl and Eastern Peripheral Nahuatl. Hasler (1996:164) summarizes the situation,

Juan Hasler (1958:338) interprets the presence in the region of [a mix of] eastern dialect features and central dialect features as an indication of a substratum of eastern Nahuatl and a superstratum of central Nahuatl. Una Canger (1980:15–20) classifies the region as part of the eastern area, while Yolanda Lastra (1986:189–190) classifies it as part of the central area.
