= Orizaba Nahuatl =

Nahuatl language of Mexico

- Āwilisāpan Nāwatl
- Native to: Mexico
- Region: Veracruz
- Native speakers: (120,000 cited 1991)
- Language family: Uto-Aztecan: Aztecan (Nahuan); Nahuatl; Central Nahuatl; Tehuacan–Zongolica Nahuatl; Orizaba Nahuatl
- Writing system: Latin

Language codes
- ISO 639-3: nlv
- Glottolog: oriz1235

Orizaba Nahuatl is a native American language spoken in the southeastern Mexican state of Veracruz mostly in the area to the south of the city of Orizaba. It is also known as Orizaba Aztec and Náhuatl de la Sierra de Zongolica. It has 79 percent intelligibility with Morelos Nahuatl. There is a dialect called Ixhuatlancillo Nahuatl which is spoken in a town to the north of Orizaba. There is one secondary school which uses this language.

== Phonology ==
=== Vowels ===
Short
	Front	Back
High	i	
Mid	e	o
Low	a	

Long
	Front	Back
High	iː ⟨ī⟩	
Mid	eː ⟨ē⟩	oː ⟨ō⟩
Low	aː ⟨ā⟩	

=== Consonants ===
Consonants
	Labial	Apical		Post- alveolar	Velar		Glottal
	Labial	Central	Lateral	Post- alveolar	Unrounded	Rounded	Glottal
Nasal	m ⟨m⟩	n ~ ŋ ⟨n⟩					
Plosive	p ⟨p⟩	t ⟨t⟩			k ⟨k⟩	kʷ ⟨kw⟩	h ⟨h⟩
Affricate		ts ⟨ts⟩	tɬ ⟨tl⟩	tʃ ⟨ch⟩			
Fricative	w ~ β ~ ɸ ⟨w⟩	s ⟨s⟩	l ⟨l⟩	ʃ ⟨x⟩	ɣ ⟨g⟩		
Semivowel	w ~ β ~ ɸ ⟨w⟩			j ⟨y⟩			

== Writing ==
The orthography of Orizaba Nahuatl (nlv) is similar to that of Classical Nahuatl (nah), though it features the consonants of this modern variety internationally rather than on the basis of Castilian (Spanish) orthography:

- "I will enter his/her house."

"Nicalaquīz īcal." [nah]
"Nikalakīs īkal." [nlv]

This corresponds to a more phonetic translation while still making use of macrons to mark long vowels. In this orthography the name of the language is Nawatl (as capitalized for English speakers), rather than Nahuatl. Most grammar and vocabulary changes are minor, most of them corresponding to neologisms and loan words from Spanish. Example:

- "Now/At this moment/Today."

"Āxcān." [nah]
"Axan." [nlv]

(In this case both long vowels and intermediate consonant are lost.)

Some loanwords from Spanish:

"Kahwen" (from café, coffee; also used in Classical Nahuatl as cafetzin).
"Kawayoh" (from caballo, horse; also used in Classical Nahuatl as cahuayoh).
"Kochih" (from coche, car).
"Refreskoh" (from refresco, soft drink or soda).
