= Mexicanero language =

Aztecan language spoken in Mexico

Mexicanero
- Durango Nahuatl
- Náhuat de Durango
- Native to: Mexico
- Region: South Durango, Nayarit
- Native speakers: 1,300 (2011)
- Language family: Uto-Aztecan: Aztecan (Nahuan); Nahuatl (dialects); Western Peripheral Nahuatl; Colima–Durango; Mexicanero

Language codes
- ISO 639-3: Either: azd – Eastern Durango Nahuatl azn – Western Durango Nahuatl
- Glottolog: dura1246

Mexicanero is the Nahuan language spoken by the Mexicanero people of southern Durango and northern Nayarit. It has around 1000 speakers in the remote towns of San Pedro Jícora and San Juan Buenaventura in the Mezquital municipality, Durango, where they coexist with speakers of Low Southern Tepehuán, and some 300 speakers in the Acaponeta municipality of Nayarit. There are significant differences between the varieties of San Pedro Jícora on the one hand and San Agustín Buenaventura and Nayarit on the other. The language is vibrant and spoken by adults and children.

Mexicanero is one of the peripheral Nahuatl languages. It uses the -lo suffix to express plurality of subject. Due to the loss of certain syllables it has acquired phonemic stress.
