= Tlaxcala–Puebla Nahuatl =

Nahuan language of Mexico

Tlaxcala-Puebla Nahuatl
- Central Nahuatl
- Native to: Tlaxcala, Puebla
- Region: western central Mexico
- Ethnicity: Tlaxcaltec
- Native speakers: (40,000 cited 1980 census)
- Language family: Uto-Aztecan: Aztecan (Nahuan); Nahuatl; Central Nahuatl; Tlaxcala-Puebla Nahuatl
- Writing system: Latin

Language codes
- ISO 639-3: nhn
- Glottolog: cent2132

The Tlaxcala-Puebla Nahuatl language, also known as Central Nahuatl, is a Nahuan language spoken by 40,000 people in central Mexico.

== Name ==
It is variously known as Central Aztec, Náhuatl del Centro, and Puebla-Tlaxcala Nahuatl. In 1990, there were 1,000 Tlaxcala-Puebla Nahuatl monolinguals.

== Phonology ==
The following description is that of the Tlaxcala dialect:

=== Vowels ===
	Front	Central	Back
High	i iː		
Mid	e eː		o oː
Low		a aː	

=== Consonants ===
	Labial	Alveolar		Palatal	Velar		Glottal
	Labial	median	lateral	Palatal	plain	labial	Glottal
Nasal	m	n					
Plosive	p	t			k	kʷ	
Affricate		ts	tɬ	tʃ			
Fricative		s		ʃ			h
Approximant			l	j		w	
