= Sierra Puebla Nahuatl =

Eastern Peripheral variety of the Nahuatl language group

- masehual tla’tol (ncj)
- Native to: Mexico
- Region: Puebla
- Native speakers: (200,000 cited 1983–2007)
- Language family: Uto-Aztecan: Aztecan (Nahuan); Nahuatl; Eastern Peripheral Nahuatl; Sierra Puebla Nahuatl
- Writing system: Latin

Language codes
- ISO 639-3: Variously: azz – Highland Puebla Nahuatl (Zacapoaxtla) ncj – Northern Puebla Nahuatl (Naupan) nhi – Tenango Nahuatl (Zacatlán–Ahuacatlán–Tepetzintla)
- Glottolog: high1278 Highland Puebla nort2957 Northern Puebla zaca1241 Zacatlan–Ahuacatlan–Tepetzintla
- ELP: Eastern Nahua ([azz)]

Sierra Puebla Nahuatl is one of the Eastern Peripheral varieties of Nahuatl, spoken by ethnic Nahua people in northwestern Puebla state in Mexico.

== Phonology ==
The following description is that of the Sierra Puebla dialects:

=== Consonants ===
		Labial	Dental/Alveolar		Palatal	Velar		Glottal
		Labial	median	lateral	Palatal	plain	labial	Glottal
Nasal		m	n			(ŋ)		
Plosive	voiceless	p	t			k	kʷ	ʔ
Plosive	voiced					g		
Affricate			ts	tɬ	tʃ			
Fricative			s		ʃ			h
Approximant	voiced			l	j		w	
Approximant	voiceless						(w̥)	

- /t, n, l/ may also freely be heard as dental [t̪, n̪, l̪] among dialects.
- /n/ can be heard as [ŋ] when before velar consonants.
- /w̥/ is of limited distribution.

=== Vowels ===
	Front		Central		Back	
	short	long	short	long	short	long
Close	i	iː			o ~ u	oː ~ uː
Mid	e	eː			o ~ u	oː ~ uː
Open			a	aː		

- Short /i e/ may be realized as [ɪ ɛ] in free variation.
- /aw/ may be realized as [ɔw].
