= Central Puebla Nahuatl =

Nahuan language of Puebla, Mexico

- Xochiltepec–Huatlatlauca Nahuatl
- Native to: Puebla
- Native speakers: (16,000 cited 1998)
- Language family: Uto-Aztecan: Aztecan (Nahuan); Nahuatl; Central Nahuatl; Central Puebla Nahuatl
- Writing system: Latin

Language codes
- ISO 639-3: ncx
- Glottolog: cent2133

The Central Puebla Nahuatl language is a Nahuan language spoken by 16,000 people in Mexico with 1,430 monolinguals. It is also known as Central Puebla Aztec, Náhuatl del Suroeste de Puebla, and Southwestern Puebla Nahuatl. The language is spoken in the area south of the city of Puebla in the towns of Teopantlán, Tepatlaxco de Hidalgo, La Magdalena Yancuitlalpan, Atoyatempan, Huatlatlauca, and Huehuetlán near Molcaxac. It is written in the Latin script and is taught in most grammar schools of the area.
