= Xoxocotla, Morelos =

Xoxocotla
- Municipality and town
- Location within Morelos Location within Mexico
- Coordinates: 18°41′06″N 99°14′38″W
- Country: Mexico
- State: Morelos

Population (2010)
  - Total: 21,074
- Time zone: UTC-6 (Central Standard Time)

Xoxocotla (modern Nahuatl pronunciation) is a town located in the southern part of the state of Morelos, about 30 km south of the state capital Cuernavaca. The name comes from the Nahuatl language, Xoxo-oco-tlan: “place where there are green pines". Formerly part of Puente de Ixtla, it became its own indigenous municipality on 1 January 2019. It recorded a population of 21,074 inhabitants in the 2010 Mexican census.

The new municipality is formed by the colonies: Cerrado del Venado, Hermosa, Loma Linda, Arboledas del Sur, La Toma, Palo Prieto, Campo Corbeta, Shaya Michan, Tierra Alta, Campo Xolistlán and Palo Prieto Fraccionamiento. It also includes the Xoxocotla Ejido fields. Zacatepec challenged the inclusion of the 200 hectares (490 acres) of Shaya Michan.

According to the agreement, the people of the new municipality will be ruled according to traditional usos y costumbres (uses and customs), and they will be required to assume part of the public debt of Puente de Ixtla. Eight months after its formation, the municipality is still struggling to resolve its differences with Puente de Ixtla.

Other Indigenous communities that were granted autonomy are Coatetelco and Hueyapan.

== History ==
Puente de Ixtla was established as a municipality in 1869, and on July 12, 1871, it annexed Xoxocotla, Tehuixtla, and the hacienda of San José. Later Xoxocotla became part of the municipality of Jojutla.

Xoxocotla had to be evacuated in 1913–1914 due to fighting during the Mexican Revolution.

In 2010 the Pueblos Mágicos ("Magical Towns") program was created to promote tourism in certain states and municipalities of the country. Puente de Ixtla did not qualify for the program, but in 2018 Morelos set up its own promotional program called Pueblos con Encanto ("Charmed Towns") including Puente de Ixtla (and by extension, Xococotla).

The Third Indigenous Book Fair took place in Xoxocotla on February 18, 2016. Poet Arnulfo Soriano of Xoxocotla presented a book of poems. Xoxocotla and Santa Ana Tlacotenco, Milpa Alta, were declared Sister Cities.

Members of the National Guard were sent to Xoxocotla during the COVID-19 pandemic in Mexico to help enforce lockdown orders and social distancing. As of May 4, 2020, there were 505 infections and 59 deaths in the state of Morelos and nine confirmed infections from coronavirus in Xoxocatla. Rumors of hundreds of cases in three days caused residents in Alpuyeca and other nearby communities to block the entrance of Xoxos (as the people are called). The state health department (Coprisem) closed a clandestine crematorium in Xoxocotla on June 2 as the state reached 1,477 cases and 290 deaths. Xoxocoatla reported 100 cases, 62 recuperations, and 38 deaths from the virus as of August 31. One hundred eighteen cases were reported on December 27, 2020.

== Notable people ==
- Lucio Carpanta, writer and teacher of Nauhtl language
- Ricardo Alberto Castañeda, traditional healer and author
- Sergio Jimenez Bénitez, novelist, La Huella de Tata (Great-grandfather's footprint)

== Points of interest ==
- Acuaski Action Park is a club for extreme sports, including water skiing, Kneeboard, and Wakeboard, as well as land sports such as BMX, Trial, and Enduro.
