= Michoacán Nahuatl =

Nahuatl variety of Mexico

- Pómaro Nahuatl
- Native to: Mexico
- Region: Pómaro and Maruata, Aquila municipality, Michoacán
- Native speakers: (3,000 cited 1990 census)
- Language family: Uto-Aztecan: Aztecan (Nahuan); Nahuatl; Western Peripheral Nahuatl; Michoacán Nahuatl

Language codes
- ISO 639-3: ncl
- Glottolog: mich1245

Michoacán Nahuatl is the name given to a variety of Nahuatl language spoken by the Nahua Michoacan on the Pacific Coast of Mexico in Michoacán. It is a dialect of Nahuatl, a language of the Uto-Aztecan family. It is the westernmost extant variant of this language, although the Uto-Aztecan family is spread further north, central, south and east. It has around 9,000 speakers which mainly reside in rural communities in the municipality of Aquila, primarily Pómaro and Maruata, in Michoacán de Ocampo,^{[a]} which coexist with the Purepecha language speakers. The Michoacan Nahuatl is one of many Nahua dialects, notably with regard to the central dialects which include tl in certain words, usually Michoacan. For example, the word for "man" in Central Nahuatl is tlacatl, whereas in Michoacan Nahuatl it is lacal.

== Phonology ==
William Sischo provides the following set of phonemes for Michoacán Nahuatl, with the dialect of Pómaro as exemplar. Marginal phonemes are in parentheses.

=== Vowels ===
	Front	Central	Back
Close	i		u
Mid	e		o
Open		a	

=== Consonants ===
	Bilabial	Dental	Alveolar	Postalveolar	Velar	Glottal
Plosive	p (b)	t (d)			k, kʷ (g)	ʔ
Fricative			s	ʃ		h
Affricate			ts	tʃ		
Lateral			l			
Nasal	m		n	(ɲ)		
Semivowel	w			j		

== Morphology ==
Michoacán Nahuatl exhibits a robust system of affixes on its nouns and verbs, including mixed forms that reflect contact with Spanish.

=== Nouns ===
The derivative suffix -ero, a borrowing from Spanish, indicates someone who is associated with a thing:

masal-ero
deer-ASSOC
'deer hunter'

mič-ero
fish-ASSOC
'fisherman'

== Syntax ==
Basic constituent order of the sentence tends to be subject - verb - object if the verb is transitive, and verb - subject if intransitive.

Sischo proposes a neutral (i.e., non-emphatic) constituent order template supporting ditransitive sentences as in the table below. Of these, only the verb is required in a sentence.

	Introducer	Temporal	Particle	Subject	Particle	Verb	Adverb	Direct Object	Indirect Object
Details	conjunctions, subordinators		pues 'so, then'		amo 'not', ayamo 'not yet', yahmo 'no more', ma 'hortatory'		manner, location adverbial		

== Notes ==
1. ^{a} Sischo names four villages where the Michoacán Nahuatl was spoken as of 1979: Ostula, Coire, Pómaro, and San Pedro Naranjestil. In 2015, Sischo named Pómaro and "its rural nuclei" Maruata and Cachán as the only remaining locales where the variety was being learned by children.
