= Guerrero Nahuatl =

Nahuan language of Mexico

- Nawatlajtoli
- Native to: Guerrero
- Region: Western Central Mexico
- Native speakers: (125,000 cited 2000)
- Language family: Uto-Aztecan: Aztecan (Nahuan); Nahuatl; Central Nahuatl; Guerrero Nahuatl
- Writing system: Latin

Language codes
- ISO 639-3: Either: ngu – Guerrero Nahuatl nuz – Tlamacazapa Nahuatl
- Glottolog: guer1241 Guerrero tlam1239 Tlamacazapa

The Guerrero Nahuatl language is a Nahuan language spoken by about 125,000 people in the Mexican state of Guerrero.

== Language ==
It is also known as Guerrero Aztec and Náhuatl de Guerrero. It is spoken in various municipalities of Guerrero along the Balsas River, including Tepecoacuilco de Trujano, Huitzuco de los Figueroa, Atenango del Río, Copalillo, Mártir de Cuilapán, Zitlala, Tixtla de Guerrero, Mochitlán, Quechultenango, Chilapa de Álvarez, Ahuacuotzingo, Olinalá, Atlixtac, Zapotitlán Tablas, Ayutla de los Libres, Cualác, Huamuxtitlán, Xochihuehuetlán, Tlapa de Comonfort, Alpoyeca, Xalpatláhuac, and Alcozauca de Guerrero. It is written in the Latin script. There is some video material in addition to a dictionary in this language. It is a subject–verb–object ordered language. The words tend to be long with affixes and clitics. Guerrero Nahuatl is not tonal.

"A long 'l' for other variants is pronounced 'j'l (hl) so the word for 'house', which is 'calli' elsewhere in Nahuatl, is pronounced 'cajli' or 'káhli' in Guerrero."

== Sources ==
- Bartholomew, Doris A.; David Mason (1980). "The registration of transitivity in the Guerrero Aztec verb". International Journal of American Linguistics. 46 (3): 197–204. doi:10.1086/465654.
- Mason, David (2011). "Vocabulario comparativo del náhuatl: Guerrero Nahuatl, Tlamacazapa Nahuatl. Computer printout of vocabulary items in two dialects of Náhuatl with translation in Spanish, introductory materials and grammatical notes".
