= Chinameca, Veracruz =

Municipality in the Mexican state of Veracruz

- City and municipality
- Location in Veracruz Chinameca, Veracruz (Mexico)
- Coordinates: 18°01′06″N 94°40′43″W
- Country: Mexico
- State: Veracruz
- Region: Olmeca Region

Government
  - Federal electoral district: Veracruz's 3rd

Area
  - Total: 157 km^{2} (61 sq mi)
- Elevation: 10 m (33 ft)

Population (2020 census)
  - Total: 22,638
  - Seat: 13,974
- Time zone: UTC-6 (Zona Centro)

Chinameca is a municipality in the Mexican state of Veracruz.

== Geography ==
It is located in the south-east zone of the state, about 290 km from state capital Xalapa. It has a surface of 157.10 km^{2} (60.66 sq mi). It is located at 18°01′N 94°41′W.

Chinameca is delimited to the north by the municipalities of Mecayapan and Pajapan, to the east by Cosoleacaque, to the south by Oteapan, Jaltipan de Morelos and Soconusco and to the west by Soteapan.

=== Weather ===
The weather in Chinameca is warm all year with rains in summer and autumn.

== Products ==
It produces principally maize, beans and oranges.

== Events ==
In Chinameca, the celebration in honor to Purísima Concepción, Patron of the town, takes place in December.
