= Tetelcingo Nahuatl =

Nahuatl variety of central Mexico

- Mösiehuali̱
- Pronunciation: [mɔa̯si̯eˈwalɪ]
- Native to: Mexico
- Region: Morelos
- Native speakers: (3,500 cited 1990 census)
- Language family: Uto-Aztecan: Aztecan (Nahuan); Nahuatl; Central Nahuatl; Nuclear; Tetelcingo Nahuatl

Language codes
- ISO 639-3: nhg
- Glottolog: tete1251

Tetelcingo Nahuatl (Tetelcingo Nahuatl: Mösiehuali̱) is a Nahuatl variety of central Mexico. It is one of the core varieties closely related to Classical Nahuatl. It is spoken in the town of Tetelcingo, Morelos, and the adjacent Colonia Cuauhtémoc and Colonia Lázaro Cárdenas. These three population centers lie to the north of Cuautla, Morelos and have been largely absorbed into its urban area; as a result the Tetelcingo language and culture are under intense pressure.

In 1935 William Cameron Townsend published a study of Mösiehuali̱, and a number of other studies have been published since then.

== Phonology ==
=== Vowels ===
Tetelcingo Nahuatl has converted the distinction of vowel quantity found in more conservative varieties into one of vowel quality. The short vowels /i e a o/ are reflected as [ɪ e a o] (orthographically ⟨i̱ e a o⟩) in Tetelcingo, while the long vowels /iː eː aː oː/ become [i i̯e ɔa̯ u] (orthographically ⟨i, ie, ö, u⟩).

“Short” Vowels
| | Front | Central | Back |
|---|---|---|---|
| Close | ɪ ⟨i̱⟩ | | |
| Mid | e ⟨e⟩ | | o ⟨o⟩ |
| Open | | a ⟨a⟩ | |

“Long” Vowels
| | Front | Central | Back |
|---|---|---|---|
| Close | i ⟨i⟩ | | u ⟨u⟩ |
| Mid | i̯e ⟨ie⟩ | | |
| Open | | | ɔa̯ ⟨ö⟩ |

=== Consonants ===
| | Labial | Apical | | Palato- alveolar | Velar | | Glottal |
| | Labial | Median | Lateral | Palato- alveolar | Unrounded | Rounded | Glottal |
|---|---|---|---|---|---|---|---|
| Nasal | m ⟨m⟩ | n ~ ŋ ⟨n⟩ | | | | | |
| Plosive | p ⟨p⟩ | t ⟨t⟩ | | | k ⟨c ~ qu⟩ | kʷ ⟨cu⟩ | |
| Affricate | | ts ⟨tz⟩ | tɬ ⟨tl⟩ | tʃ ⟨ch⟩ | | | |
| Fricative | w ~ ʋ ~ β ~ v ~ ɸ ~ w̥ ⟨hu/u/b/f⟩ | s ⟨s⟩ | | ʃ ⟨x⟩ | | | h ~ χ ⟨j⟩ |
| Approximant | w ~ ʋ ~ β ~ v ~ ɸ ~ w̥ ⟨hu/u/b/f⟩ | ɾ ⟨r⟩ | l ~ ɬ ⟨l⟩ | j ⟨y⟩ | | | |

Tetelcingo Nahuatl, like many dialects of Nahuatl, does not have voiced obstruent consonants (with one clear exception: the stem /maga/, meaning 'fight' is derived from /maka/ 'give, hit'). Voiced obstruents and other non-native consonants do occur in loanwords from Spanish, however, and there are many such words in the language.

=== Honorifics ===
Another striking characteristic of Tetelcingo Nahuatl is the pervasiveness and complexity of its honorifics. Generally every 2nd or 3rd person verb, pronoun, postposition or possessed noun must be marked honorifically if its subject or object, designatum, object or possessor (respectively) is a living adult (the speaker's wife or adult children being exceptions). Extra-honorific forms of several kinds exist, especially for addressing or referring to godparental relations, high officials or God. Many third person honorifics use morphemes that in Classical Nahuatl were used to mark non-active (passive) verbs or unspecified or plural participants. Not infrequently a different (suppletive) stem is used for honorifics, or the honorific form is in some other way irregular.

A few examples are given below, using the orthography of Brewer and Brewer 1962. Where more than one form is listed, the second is more highly honorific.

| Stem Meaning | 2nd person sg | 2nd person sg honorific | 3rd person sg | 3rd person sg honorific |
|---|---|---|---|---|
| pronoun | taja | tejuatzi | yaja | yejuatzi |
| one's house | mocal | mocaltzi | ical | tiecal, tiecaltzi |
| before | mixpa | mixpantzinco | ixpa | tieixpa, tieixpantzinco |
| go | ti̱ya | tomobica | yabi̱ | biloa, mobica |
| come | ti̱bitz | ti̱mobicatz, ti̱hualmobica | i̱bitz | biloatz, hualmobica |
| notice it, get it (a point) | ti̱qui̱jti̱li̱a | tomojti̱li̱li̱a | qui̱jti̱li̱a | qui̱jti̱lilo |
| say it | ti̱qui̱jtoa | tomojtalfi̱a | qui̱jtoa | qui̱jtulo |

== Literature ==
- Brewer, Forrest; Brewer, Jean G. (1962). Vocabulario mexicano de Tetelcingo. Serie de vocabularios y diccionarios indígenas "Mariano Silva y Aceves" (in Spanish). Vol. 8. México: Instituto Lingüístico de Verano.
- Pittman, Richard S. (1948). "Nahuatl honorifics". International Journal of American Linguistics. 14 (4): 236–239. doi:10.1086/464010.
- Pittman, Richard S. (1954). "A grammar of Tetelcingo (Morelos) Nahuatl". Language. 30 (1, Part 2: Language Dissertation No. 50): 5–67. doi:10.2307/522207. JSTOR 522207.
- Tuggy, David (1979). "Tetelcingo Nahuatl". In Langacker, Ronald W. (ed.). Modern Aztec Grammatical Sketches. Studies in Uto-Aztecan Grammar. Vol. 2. Arlington, TX: Summer Institute of Linguistics and University of Texas at Arlington. pp. 1–140.
- Tuggy, David (2008) [1981]. The transitivity-related verbal morphology of Tetelcingo Nahuatl: an exploration in Space [Cognitive] grammar (PhD thesis). UC San Diego.
