= Betanzos (surname) =

Betanzos is a surname.

== Notable people with this name include ==
- Domingo Betanzos, (?-1549) was a Spanish Dominican missionary to Central America
- Juan de Betanzos (1510–1576), wrote one of the most important sources on the conquest of the Incan civilization, Narrative of the Incas
- Miguel Betanzos (1962-), an Argentine novelist
- Odón Betanzos (1925–2007), a Spanish poet, novelist, literary critic and professor
- Pedro de Betanzos (?-1570), a Spanish Franciscan missionary and linguist.
- Yoandri Betanzos (1982-), a Cuban athlete competing in the triple jump.
