= Superocheros =

The Superocheros (The Super-eighters) were a group of political film makers in Mexico. In the late 1960s, Mexico experienced an intense conflict of ideologies between state officials and university students. In the spirit of left wing politics and democracy, students organized and protested in order to promote social change. When the state responded by coordinating a military assault that ended up killing hundreds of unarmed students, students resorted to 8mm Super 8 film to express their grievances with the state and evade state censorship. This group of mostly male college students identified as the Superocheros, adopting the name of the type of film with which they shot films.

== History ==
This social movement led by the radical youth became popular and eventually gained the attention of the Institutional Revolutionary Party (PRI). Because of the youth counterculture's rapid spreading influence, President Gustavo Díaz Ordaz ordered for the formation of a special military unit designed specifically to infiltrate and disrupt student protests. This military unit was named Los Halcones (The Falcons) and commanded by President Díaz Ordaz’ Interior Secretary, Luis Echeverría. On October 2, 1968, Echeverría coordinated a military level strike on unarmed student protestors gathered in the Plaza de las Tres Culturas in the Tlatelolco section of Mexico City. Hundreds of university students were murdered by this assault and it became known as the Tlatelolco Massacre. Soon after, frustrated students and activists poured their time and energy into shooting Super 8 films.

The young radicals used filmmaking as a tool to express their dissatisfaction with the state and to reflect their harsh lived realities. These young organizers referred to their collective mentality for political and social change as “La Onda”. This spirit of criticizing the state through the medium of 8mm film worked to establish an identity for young artists. The Superocheros created films that defied the traditional sense of Mexican national cinema. In their attempt to specifically oppose Golden Age Mexican Cinema, the Superocheros were influence from European new-wave cinema and also adopted the ideology of the auteur. The Superocheros created critical and conceptual low budget films that were privately exhibited in underground bars, coffee shops and social hangouts. The independent film counterculture is officially stated to have begun with a festival style exhibition in 1970. The socially conscious ideologies set forth by La Onda combined with the ambitious actions of the Superocheros eventually manifested into what can be considered the earliest version of Independent Cinema in Mexico.

== State funded films ==
When Gustavo Díaz Ordaz left office and Luis Echeverría succeeded him as president, state polices changed. Echeverría implemented an initiative to recreate the notion of Mexican National Cinema by using state funding to finance new, high-quality national cinema. Ironically, the individual responsible for the murder of hundreds of unarmed students just two years before was Echeverría himself. Echeverría's brother and former actor Rodolfo Landa Echeverría, was appointed the head of the new national cinema initiative and was responsible for funding projects that would make Mexican National cinema respectable, as it was during the days of Golden Age Mexican Cinema.

Although the goal of rebuilding a national cinema was intended to reflect Mexico as a progressive society, many of the state policies remained unchanged and the same political ideals implemented by Díaz Ordaz remained intact under Echeverría. In fact, many films funded during Echeverría's presidency specifically attempted to mock youth counterculture. Despite Echeverría's efforts to make a mockery of youth counterculture, it was during his time in office that a number of independent filmmakers would emerge and advance from directing films as a part of the underground counterculture to directing state funded big-budget projects. As Felipe Cazals proved to be a standout talent, he was granted funding for a number of films during Echeverría's sexenio including Las Poquianchis, The Heist, Zapata, and eventually his most critically acclaimed and controversial film Canoa: A Shameful Memory.

== The declaration of independence - 8 millimeter vs 8 million ==
While directors such as Cazals, Arturo Ripstein and others experienced commercial success as well as critical acclaim for their state funded films, the Superocheros became vocal about their grievances with the director's claims of being independent filmmakers. In 1972, the Superocheros created a document titled 8mm vs 8million, which was a declaration of independence that directly called out Cazals and others as they believed that the directors were violating the term “independent” when they used it to categorize their work. This document not only expresses a clear disdain for state censored filmmaking, but functions as a clear guide to understanding how the counterculture ideologies of the time defined the term, independent.

According to the document, in order to be considered independent, a filmmaker must abide to the specific rules and ideologies laid out in the manifesto. Signed by forty-eight filmmakers, this manifesto serves as document of the conflicts over the meaning of the term independent in Mexico. This document would later prove to lose its conviction as Felipe Cazals demonstrated the ways in which state funded films could incorporate the major ideals of independence laid out in the manifesto even if the film did not meet certain requirements. Things would also change for the underground counterculture as commercial filmmaking began to attract Superochero filmmakers, driving them away from the counterculture and into the mainstream.
