= Domingo Betanzos =

Spanish missionary (c.1480-1549)

Domingo Betanzos (c. 1480 - 14 September 1549) was a Spanish Dominican missionary to New Spain, who participated in the "Spiritual Conquest", evangelizing the indigenous.

== Life ==
Betanzos was born around 1480 in the city of León, Spain. He graduated in civil and ecclesiastical law from the University of Salamanca. He made a pilgrimage to Rome and spent two years as a hermit on the island of Ponza, near Naples. After returning to Salamanca he joined the Dominicans and was ordained a priest in 1513. Later that year, he traveled to Hispaniola with seven other Dominican friars and worked on the island for more than twelve years as a missionary.

In 1516 he, with several other Dominicans, wrote a letter to Las Casas on the rapid disappearance of the Indians of the Antilles, concerning the numbers of the aboriginal population, and the excesses thought to have been committed by the Spaniards. In 1518 Betanzos and Pedro de Córdoba attempted to establish a mission on the island of Margarita, but extreme hostility of the indigenous people forced the Dominicans to return to Hispaniola. In 1522, Betanzos, then vicar of the Dominican friars in Hispaniola, convinced the cleric Bartolomé de las Casas to enter the Dominican novitiate.

In 1526, Betanzos went to Mexico, one of the first Dominicans; and he is considered the founder of the Dominican province of Santiago de México. According to Franciscan fray Gerónimo de Mendieta, Betanzos did not know any native language and had little to do with Indians, his time being absorbed by administrative duties.

Tomás de Berlanga almost immediately claimed that it belonged to his newly founded province of Santa Cruz with the provincial seat at Santo Domingo. Betanzos went to Spain in 1531 and obtained from the Holy See the independence of his foundation. He also established the Dominican Province of Guatemala.

As Provincial of Mexico in 1535, he organized missions among three Indigenous groups stocks: the Nahua people, the Mixtec people, and the Zapotec people. He returned to Spain in 1549, and died in September of the same year at Valladolid. The Bishopric of Guatemala was tendered to Betanzos, but he declined it.

In his classic work on the evangelization of Mexico, French scholar Robert Ricard called Betanzos zealous, "an impetuous character, not well balanced, but not without intelligence" with a passionate temper.

A portrait of Betanzos on amatl (maguey paper) was held in the church of Tlazcantla, Tepetlaostoc (Mexico).

== Views ==
In his letter of 1516, he acquiesced in the views of his brethren of the order on the question of Indian policy. In the "Opinion" (Parecer) given by him in 1541, and approximately repeated in 1542, just as the New Laws limiting the encomienda in the Indies were to be promulgated under the influence of Las Casas, he took an entirely different attitude. He quietly gave his opinion in a sense diametrically opposed to the measures Las Casas pressed upon the Government.

Betanzos was an intimate friend of distinguished Franciscans of Mexico – Archbishop of Mexico Fray Juan de Zumárraga, Fray Toribio de Benavente Motolinia, and others, who did not agree with Las Casas. When the Franciscans established the Colegio de Santa Cruz de Tlatelolco to educate elite Nahua men for the Christian priesthood, Betanzos objected to the Council of the Indies, calling into question the rationality of the Indians. Betanzos had questioned the ability of the Indians to understand doctrine sufficiently even to be baptized, which obviously would preclude their being trained for the priesthood. Betanzos argued that training an indigenous priesthood was a thoroughly bad idea because Indians would lack understanding and authority to preach and to teach and would spread heresy; and he argued that teaching Indians Latin would allow them to expose the ignorance of [European] priests.

Betanzos's theological doubt about Indians' rationality garnered the support of Spanish settlers wishing to exploit them. The Franciscan supporters of the establishment of a colegio to train Indian men for the priesthood pushed back against the Dominican's doubts.

Betanzos was in accord with the other mendicant orders (Franciscans and Augustinians) that they were not interested in reaping material benefit from the Indians, and did not require the payment of tithes (usually a ten percent tax on agriculture); Betanzos declined four Indian towns offered to the order.

He is credited with the authorship of an addition to the "Doctrina" of Fray Pedro de Córdoba which appeared in 1544, in collaboration with Franciscan Juan de Zumárraga.

== Bibliography ==
- Rodríguez, Pedro Fernández. "Domingo de Betanzos". Real Academia de la Historia.
