= Betanzos (disambiguation) =

Betanzos may refer to:

- Betanzos, a municipality in the province of A Coruña, Galicia, Spain
- Betanzos (comarca), a comarca in the Province of A Coruña, Galicia, Spain
- Betanzos (Bolivia), a municipality in Potosí Department, Bolivia
- Betanzos CF, a football team based in Betanzos in the Province of A Coruña, Galicia, Spain
- Betanzos (Vino de la Tierra), a Spanish geographical indication for Vino de la Tierra wines located in the autonomous community of Galicia

== People ==
- Betanzos (surname)
