= Augustin de Betancourt =

Augustin (Agustin) de Betancourt may refer to:

- Agustín de Vetancurt (1620–1700), Mexican Catholic historian and scholar of the Nahuatl language
- Agustín de Betancourt (1758–1825), Spanish engineer
