= Francisco Zamora (disambiguation) =

Francisco Zamora Salinas (1939–2002), football player from El Salvador.

Francisco Zamora may also refer to:

- Francisco Zamora (OFM) de Cuenca, on List of ministers general of the Order of Friars Minor
- Francisco Zamora, musician in Puerto Rican group, Los Favoritos
- Francis Zamora, Filipino politician, businessman, and basketball player
- Francisco Zamora de Orello, Roman Catholic prelate
