= Colegio de Santa Cruz de Tlatelolco =

University in Tlatelolco, Mexico City

Coordinates: 19.4509°N 99.1367°W

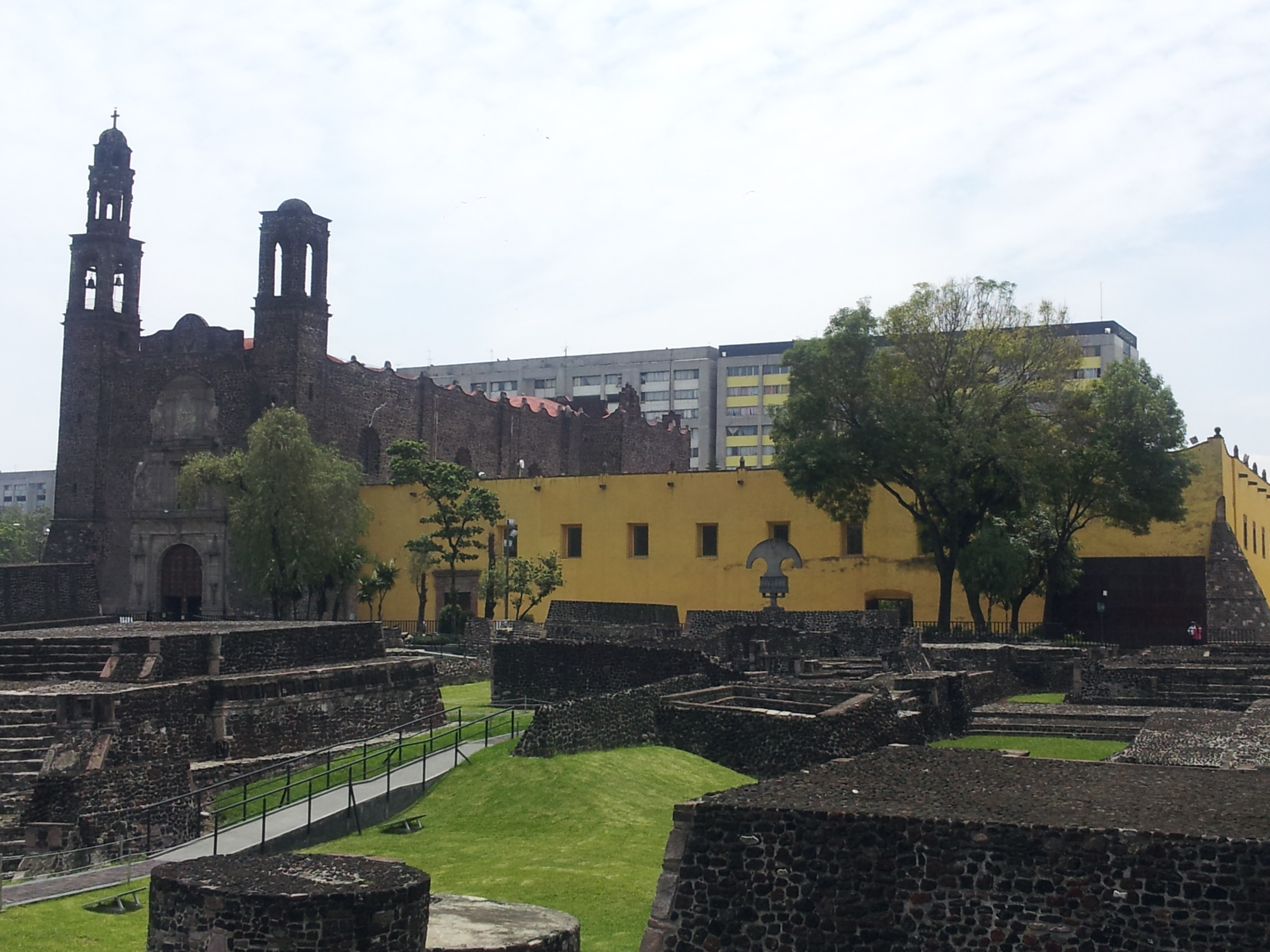
- The Colegio viewed from the Plaza de las Tres Culturas
- Type: Catholic
- Established: January 6, 1536; 490 years ago
- Location: Tlatelolco, Mexico City, Mexico
- Campus: Urban

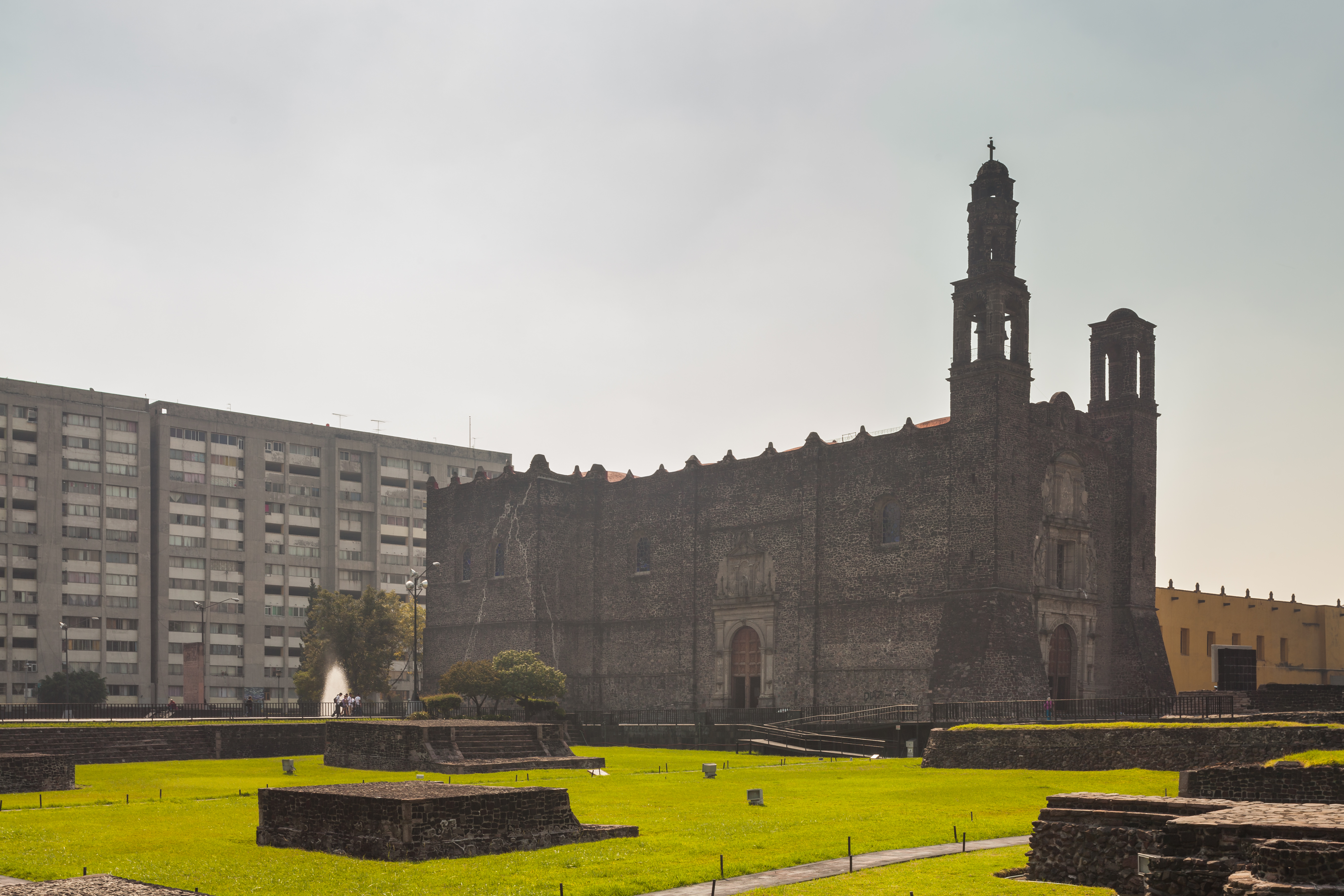
Exterior of the church

The Colegio de Santa Cruz in Tlatelolco, Mexico City, is the first and oldest European school of higher learning in the Americas and the first major school of interpreters and translators in the New World. It was established by the Franciscans on January 6, 1536, with the intention, as is generally accepted, of preparing Native American boys for eventual ordination to the Catholic priesthood. Students trained in the Colegio were important contributors to the work of Franciscan Bernardino de Sahagún in the creation of his monumental twelve-volume General History of the Things of New Spain, often referred to as the Florentine Codex. The failure of the Colegio had long-lasting consequences, with scholar Robert Ricard saying that "[had] the College of Tlatelolco given the country even one [native] bishop, the history of the Mexican Church might have been profoundly changed."

== History ==
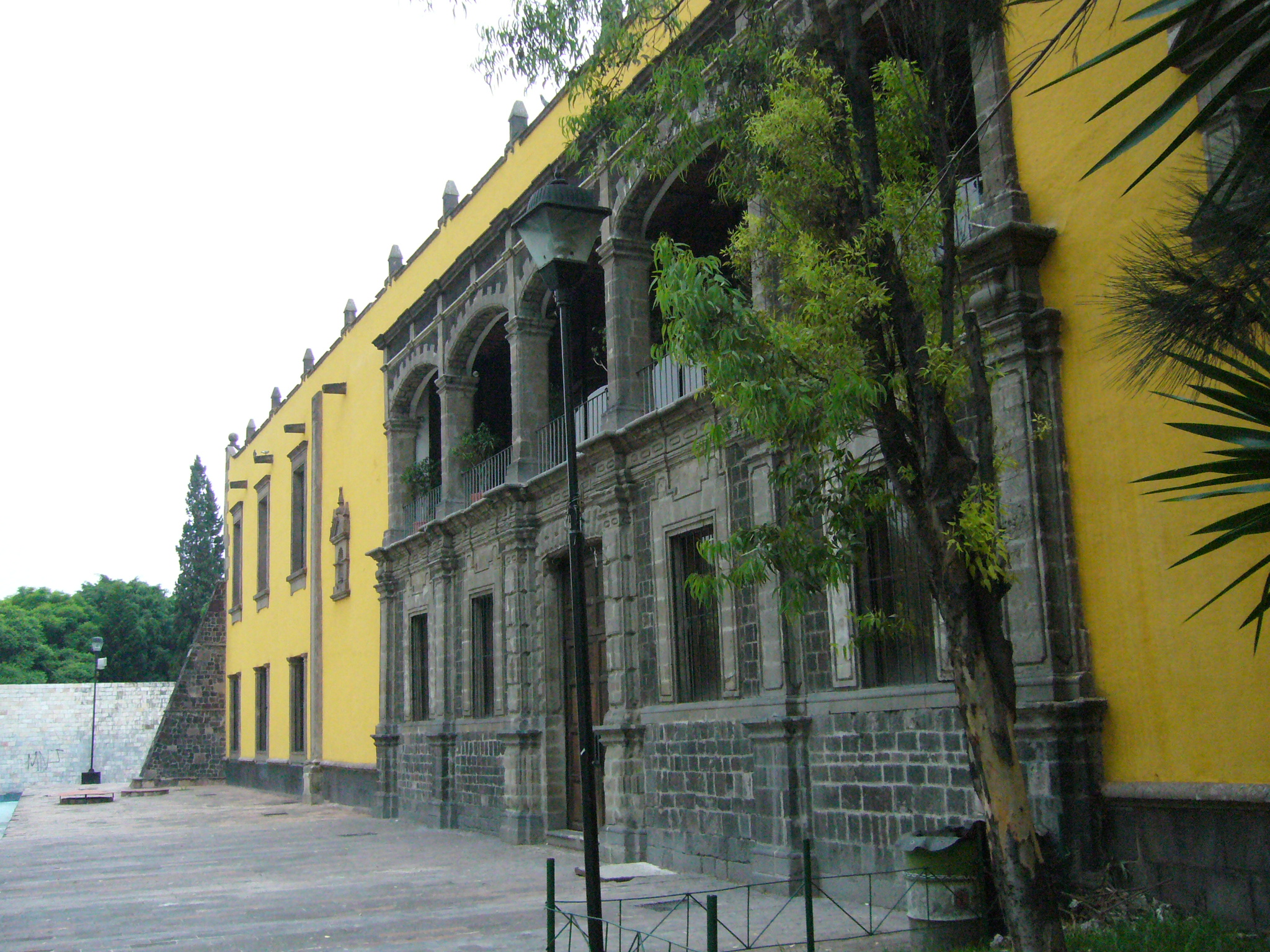
The convent of the college of Santa Cruz de Tlatelolco

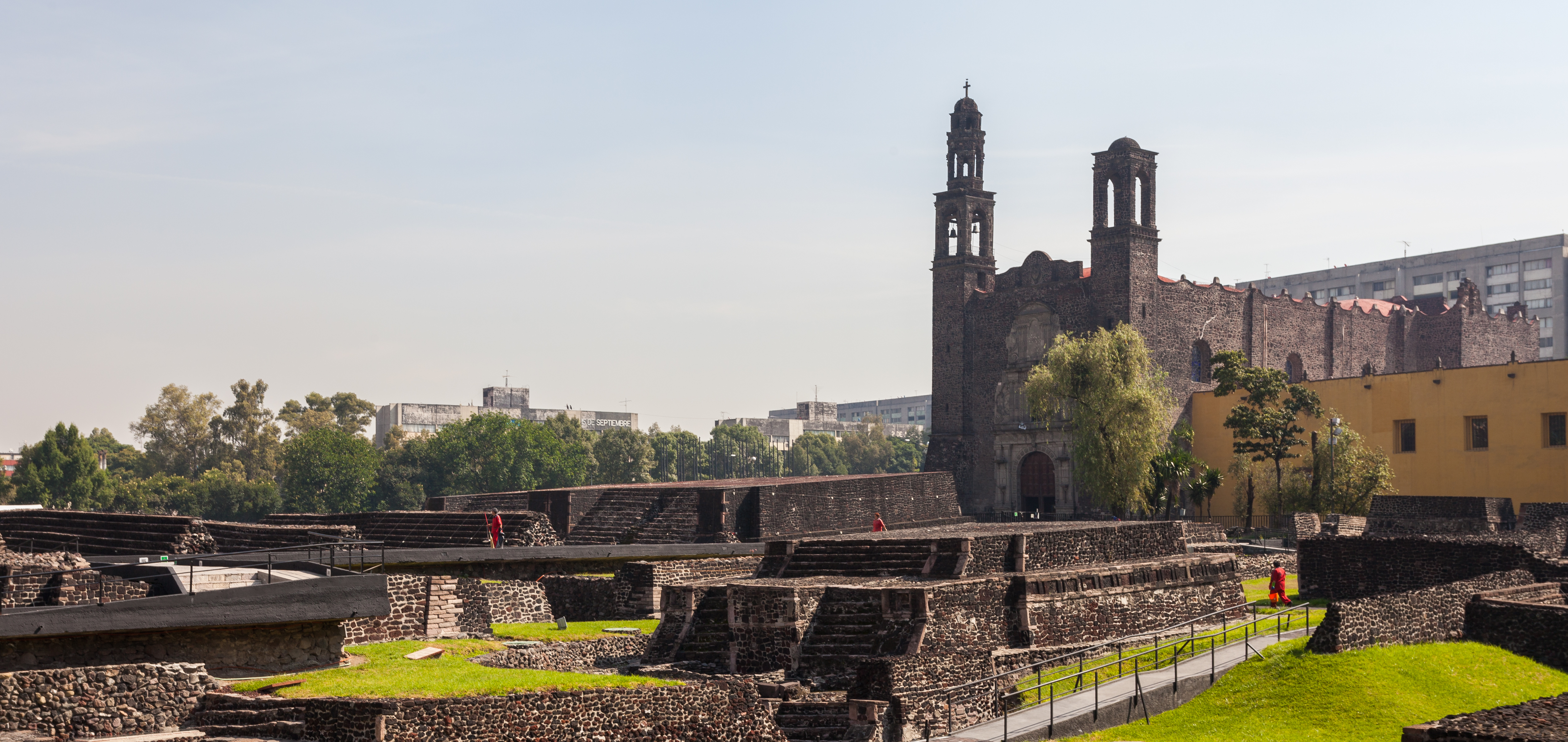
The archaeological site of Tlatelolco with the church at background

The Colegio was built by the Franciscan order on the initiative of the President of the Audiencia Sebastián Ramírez de Fuenleal, Bishop Don Juan de Zumárraga, and Viceroy Don Antonio de Mendoza on the site of an Aztec school, for the sons of nobles (Classical Nahuatl: Calmecac). It was inaugurated on January 6, 1536; however, it had been a functioning school since August 8, 1533.

While Bishop of Santo Domingo, Ramírez de Fuenleal had encouraged the Franciscans to teach the sons of Aztecs grammar in their native Nahuatl. Franciscan Arnaldo de Basccio began the task with considerable success, which gave support to the project of establishing an institute of higher learning. Ramírez de Fuenleal urged the crown to provide funds to establish and support such an institution. The Franciscans had already established primary schools prior to the Colegio: one at Texcoco, established by Fray Pedro de Gante in 1523 and the other by the leader of the First Twelve Franciscans, Martín de Valencia in Mexico-Tenochtitlan in 1525. Still others were founded by Franciscans in this early period. These schools for indigenous and mestizo boys taught basic literacy, but also singing, instruction in how to help with the mass, and sometimes manual labor. The primary education of indigenous girls was also a concern and schools were established in Mexico City, Texcoco and six other locations lasting only for a decade.

But not until the establishment of the Colegio de Santa Cruz were sons of indigenous men given higher education. Bishop Juan de Zumárraga was a supporter of the establishment of the Colegio, but credited Fuenleal and the crown for the accomplishment. The Colegio was inaugurated on January 6, 1536, the feast of the Epiphany, deliberately chosen for its symbolism of calling the gentiles to the true faith. The establishment of such a school to train young men for the priesthood was highly controversial, with opposition especially coming from Dominican friars and articulated by the head of that order, Fray Domingo Betanzos. Franciscan Bernardino de Sahagún wrote a strong defense of the capacity of the Aztec, countering the opinions of those who doubted their ability not only to learn Latin grammar, but to speak, and compose in it. He went on to refute concerns about the possibility of the indigenous Mexicans spreading heresy. Betanzos in his opposition to the Colegio said that Native Americans who knew Latin could expose the ignorance of the existing European priests, an argument that perhaps unwittingly did the same.

The original purpose of the Colegio was to educate a male indigenous priesthood, and so pupils were selected from the most prestigious families of the Aztec ruling class. These young men, often "Indio Latinos", or hispanicized native populations, were taught to be literate in Nahuatl, Spanish and Latin, and received instruction in Latin in music, rhetoric, logic, and philosophy, and indigenous medicine. One student educated at the Colegio was Nahua botanist Martín de la Cruz, who wrote the Libellus de Medicinalibus Indorum Herbis, an illustrated herbal.

Actual instruction at the Colegio was by two Franciscans at a time, aided by Aztec assistants. Among the teachers were notable scholars and grammarians such as Franciscans Andrés de Olmos, Alonso de Molina and Bernardino de Sahagún, all of whom have made important contributions to the study of both the Classical Nahuatl language and the ethnography and anthropology of Mesoamerica. Other Franciscans who taught there were Fray Juan de Goana, Fray Francisco de Bustamante, Fray García de Cisneros, Fray Arnaldo de Basaccio, and Fray Juan Focher. Fray Juan de Torquemada also served as a teacher and administrator at the Colegio. When recollecting historical and ethnographical information for the elaboration of the Florentine Codex, Sahagún used his trilingual students to elicit information from the Aztec elders and to transcribe it in Spanish and Nahuatl and to illuminate the manuscripts.

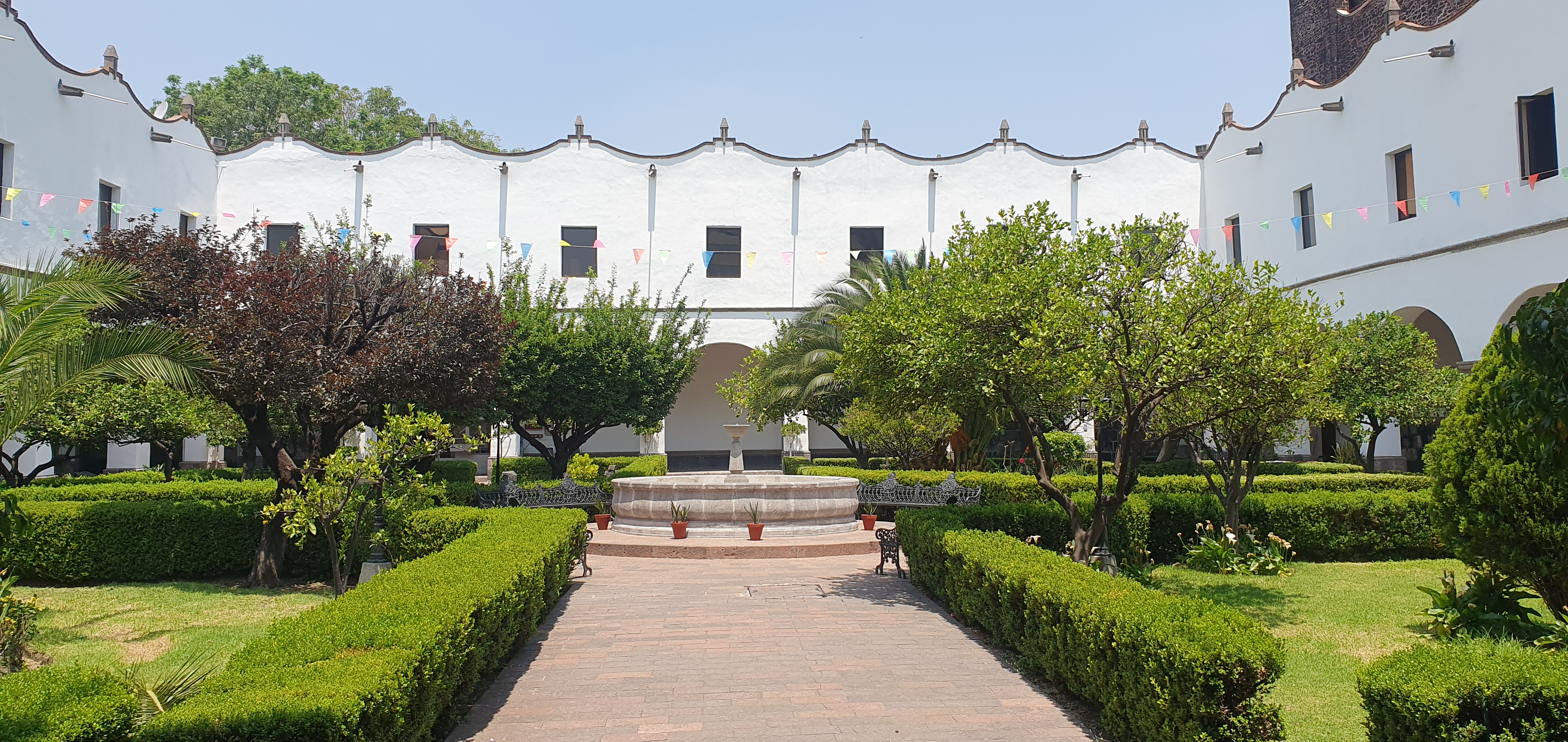
The courtyard of the convent

Opened with great fanfare, the ceremony was attended by Viceroy Mendoza, Bishop Juan de Zumárraga, and the President of the Audiencia, Sebastián Ramírez de Fuenleal with a great crowd to view the proceedings. Fray Alonso de Herrera preached the sermon at the opening Mass. Following the religious ceremony, there was a banquet hosted by Zumárraga for guests and the first pupils, chosen from the convent of San Francisco de México.

Although there was great support from many sectors (excluding the Dominicans who objected to the founding of the Colegio), the physical structure was at first quite modest for lack of funds and later a stone house was built.

The first sixty male students was a small cohort of sons of noble families; there was tremendous need for many more pupils, so the Franciscans actively recruited others from important towns in central Mexico, two or three boys 10 to 12 years of age. The pupils lived in the Colegio in very modest circumstances. A common eating area and sleeping quarters with beds being only a mat and a blanket placed on individual wooden platforms to keep pupils from the damp floor. Some important pupils trained at the school were Antonio Valeriano, who was the most prominent of those who collaborated with Sahagún. Spanish judge Alonso de Zorita, author of Life and Labor in Ancient Mexico: the Brief and Summary Relation of the Lords of New Spain was aided by the translations of Pablo Nazareno, a former pupil at the Colegio.

The Franciscans continued to teach at the Colegio, but could not afford to keep up the building or other expenses, so they turned it over to the crown shortly after the Colegio opened in 1536. In 1546 the Franciscans gave up any management of the property and it was turned over to the pupils and former pupils to run. By 1550 due to poor management, the buildings were falling down and pupils had to become day students. In 1555, Aztecs were forbidden from ordination to the priesthood, so that the original purpose of the school to train a native priesthood was ended. In the seventeenth century when Franciscan Augustín de Vetancurt was writing, the Colegio was a complete ruin.

In modern Mexico City the Plaza de las Tres Culturas, close to the location of the Colegio, commemorates this part of the cultural history of Mexico.

== Church of Santiago Tlatelolco ==
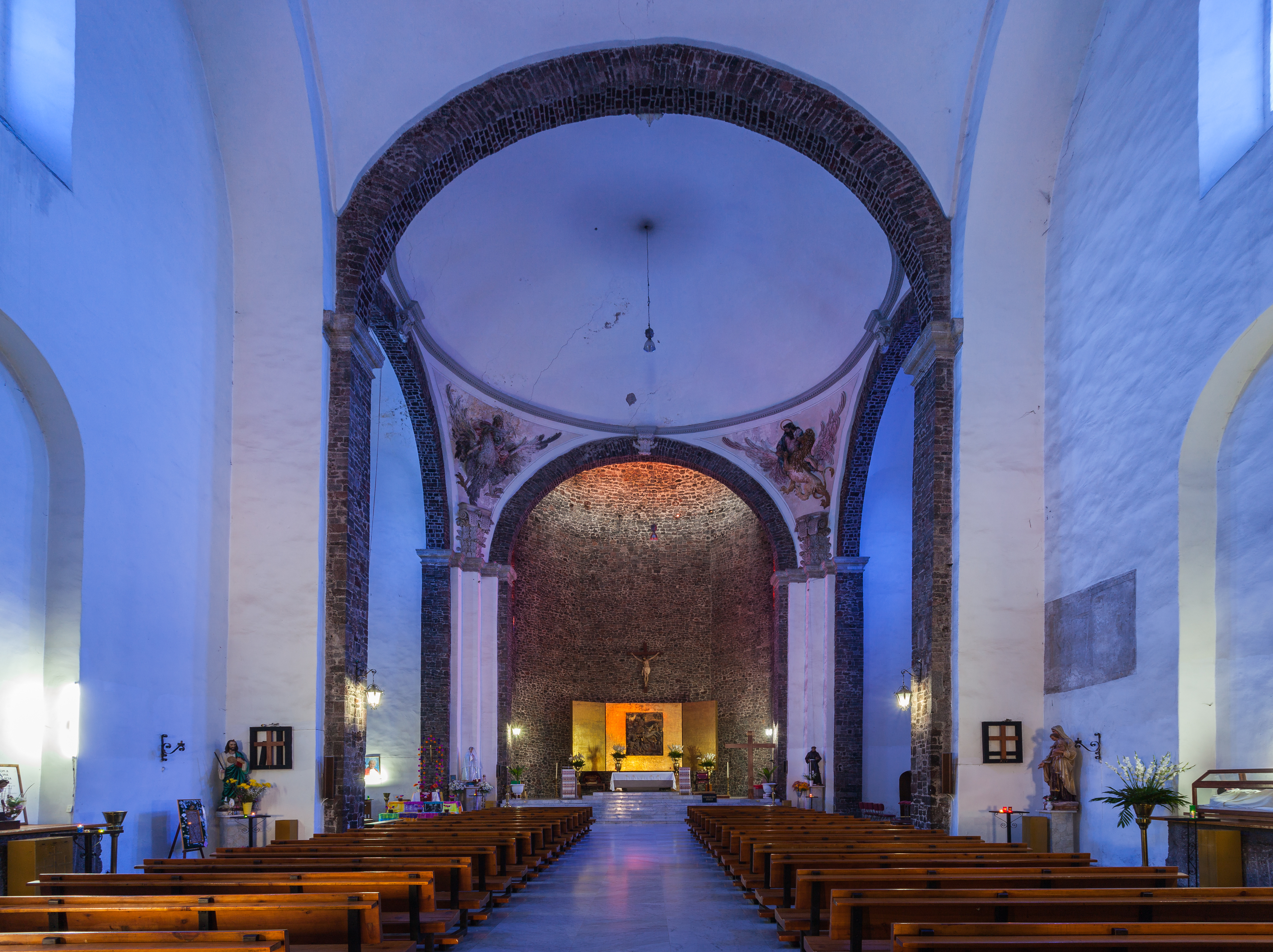
Interior of the church

The Colegio today is centered around the Church of Santiago Tlatelolco, which was completed in its present form in 1609. However, the site was first dedicated as a church in 1524 with stones reused from the demolished temple buildings of adjacent Tlateloco. Bernal Diaz, in his Conquest of New Spain, records that "After we conquered that great and strong city (Tlatelolco), we decided to build a church to our patron and guide, St. James, in place of that of Huichilobos' cue (temple)—and a great part of the site was taken for that purpose."

To this day, a recycled stone depicting the god Tlaloc can be seen at the rear of the church's apse. St. Juan Diego was baptized in the forerunner to the present structure and was, in fact, on his way to the church when he encountered his first Marian apparition. It continued functioning after the demise of the Colegio. The austere Franciscan structure was decorated with a rich collection of altarpieces in 1763, and was fully painted in frescos. In 1861, the church's use for religious purposes ended; in the next century, it would be used for a variety of purposes, including as a winery and a military prison. The church's altarpieces and most of its frescos were destroyed during this time. It was remodeled and returned to a religious purpose in 1964. Visible remnants of the building's first use as a church include paintings of the Four Evangelists on the pendentives and a large fresco of St. Christopher on the lefthand wall. Additionally, the font that Juan Diego was supposed to have been baptized in sits directly inside the front doors of the church. The church's exterior walls are damaged by bullet holes, dating to the Tlatelolco Massacre of 1968.

== Legacy ==
The Colegio was founded in the early sixteenth century in a period of great optimism about the capacity of the Indians and the prospects for their being ordained as Catholic priests. Its failure in the late sixteenth century was a serious one. According to Robert Ricard, the "error prevented the Church from striking deep roots in the nation, gave it the appearance and character of a foreign institution, and kept it dependent upon the mother country." There were some Indian men ordained in the later colonial period, but they were few and never held high posts. American-born Spaniards, criollos, were trained in Mexican seminaries, but there was no significant native clergy.

The training of elite young men at the Colegio in grammar, rhetoric, and theology did, however, enormously aid the Franciscans in their efforts to evangelize the Indians and to record indigenous history and culture in texts that remain fundamental to the understanding of Nahua culture.

The Colegio's extensive library was abandoned by the 17th century; however, a large portion of its collection survived and was sent to Convent of San Francisco in the 1830s. Upon the implementation of La Reforma in 1859, the Convent was required to integrate its collection with that of the new National Library. However, a significant part of the convent's collection was sold to the book dealer Francisco Abadiano, who in turn sold it to Adolph Sutro, who aspired to build a world-class research library for the U.S. city of San Francisco. Many of the books from the convent's collection burned in the 1906 San Francisco earthquake and fire, while others survived and remain in the Sutro Library.

== See also ==
- Harvard Indian College
- Plaza de las Tres Culturas
- Tlatelolco (archaeological site)
- List of oldest buildings in the Americas
