= Andrés González de Barcia =

Spanish historian

The Most Excellent Andrés González de Barcia
- Born: 1673; Madrid, Spain
- Died: 4 November 1743 (aged 69–70); Madrid, Spain

Seat D of the Real Academia Española
- In office 9 July 1713 – 4 November 1743
- Preceded by: Seat established
- Succeeded by: Antonio Ventura de Prado y Terrín

Andrés González de Barcia (died 4 November 1743) was a Spanish historian and one of the founders of the Royal Spanish Academy.

== Works ==
He published Ensayo cronologico para la historia general de la Florida (Madrid, 1723), and First Historians of the West Indies, issued in sections, and published collectively after his death (3 vols., folio, 1749). He also edited Herrera's Décadas (1725–30); de la Vega, La Florida (1723), Comentarios reales de los Incas (1723); and Torquemada; Gregorio García's Origen de los indios del Nuevo Mundo (1729); Antonio de Solís, Historia de la conquista de México (1732); Alonso de Ercilla, La Araucana (1733). Appearing posthumously are his Fernando de Colón, Historia del Almirante Colón (1749); Hernán Cortés, Cartas de relación (1749); Gonzalo Fernández de Oviedo y Valdés, Sumario de la natural historia de las Indias (1749); Alvar Núñez Cabeza de Vaca, Relación de la jornada que hizo a la Florida con el adelantado Pánfilo de Narvaez (1749); Francisco López de Gómara, Historia de las Indias y de la conquista de México (1749); and Francisco de Xérez, Verdadera relación de la conquista del Perú (1749).

== Sources ==
- Wilson, J. G.; Fiske, J., eds. (1900). "Barcia, Andrés González de" . Appletons' Cyclopædia of American Biography. New York: D. Appleton.
- Cañizares-Esguerra, Jorge (2007-04-30). "Andrés González de Barcia and the Creation of the Colonial Spanish American Library (review)". Libraries & the Cultural Record. 42 (1): 90–91. doi:10.1353/lac.2007.0001. ISSN 2166-3033. S2CID 161739078.
