= Gerónimo de Mendieta =

Spanish Franciscan missionary and historian

Fray Gerónimo de Mendieta (1525–1604), alternatively Jerónimo de Mendieta, was a Franciscan missionary and historian, who spent most of his life in the Spanish Empire's new possessions in Mexico and Central America.

His main work is the Historia eclesiástica indiana, written in the late sixteenth century, but not published until 1870 by Joaquín García Icazbalceta, which recounts the history of Franciscan evangelization in the colony of New Spain in the Americas and abuses of the indigenous by Spanish civil society.

== Biography ==
Gerónimo de Mendieta was born in Vitoria, Álava, in the Basque country of (Spain), in 1525. When he was twenty years old he entered the Franciscan order in Bilbao. In 1554 he traveled to New Spain to live in Tochimilco where he was taught the local Nahuatl language. He was later moved to Tlaxcala where he became a friend of fellow Franciscan Toribio de Benavente "Motolinia". "Mendieta learned Nahuatl from Motolinia," and Motolina's optimism about indigenous conversion influenced Mendieta.

He returned to the Iberian Peninsula in 1570, bringing with him the first copies of the works of Bernardino de Sahagún to the Spanish authorities. He returned to Mexico again in 1573, this time never to return to Europe. He returned under order to compose a history of the work of evangelizing the Americas. From his return to Mexico until 1597 he lived in the monastery of Tlatelolco, working on the history that would make him famous, the Historia eclesiástica indiana, a chronicle of the early evangelization history of the New World. The publication of the work was prohibited, as it was deemed to contain "unsound," millenarian, Joachimite ideas, and it was only published for the first time in 1870, when it was brought to light by Joaquín García Icazbalceta.

In his work, Mendieta espoused that Amerindians were one of the Ten Lost Tribes of Israel, stating they practiced circumcision due to their alleged Jewish ancestry, despite the evidence that no circumcision was performed among Mesoamericans, only scarification of the prepuce in some tribes. His version of story was later adopted by Juan de Torquemada.
