= Francisco Solís (bishop) =

Most Reverend Francisco Solís
- Bishop of Drivasto
- Church: Catholic Church
- Diocese: Diocese of Drivasto
- In office: 1525?–1540
- Successor: Alfonso de Sanabria

Francisco Solís was a Roman Catholic prelate who served as Bishop of Drivasto (?–1540).

== Biography ==
Francisco Solís served as Bishop of Drivasto until 1540. While bishop, he was the principal co-consecrator of Juan de Zumárraga, Bishop of México (1533).

Catholic Church titles
Preceded by	Bishop of Drivasto; 1525?–1540	Succeeded by Alfonso de Sanabria
