= Plaza de las Tres Culturas =

Plaza in Mexico City

Coordinates: 19°27′4″N 99°08′14″W

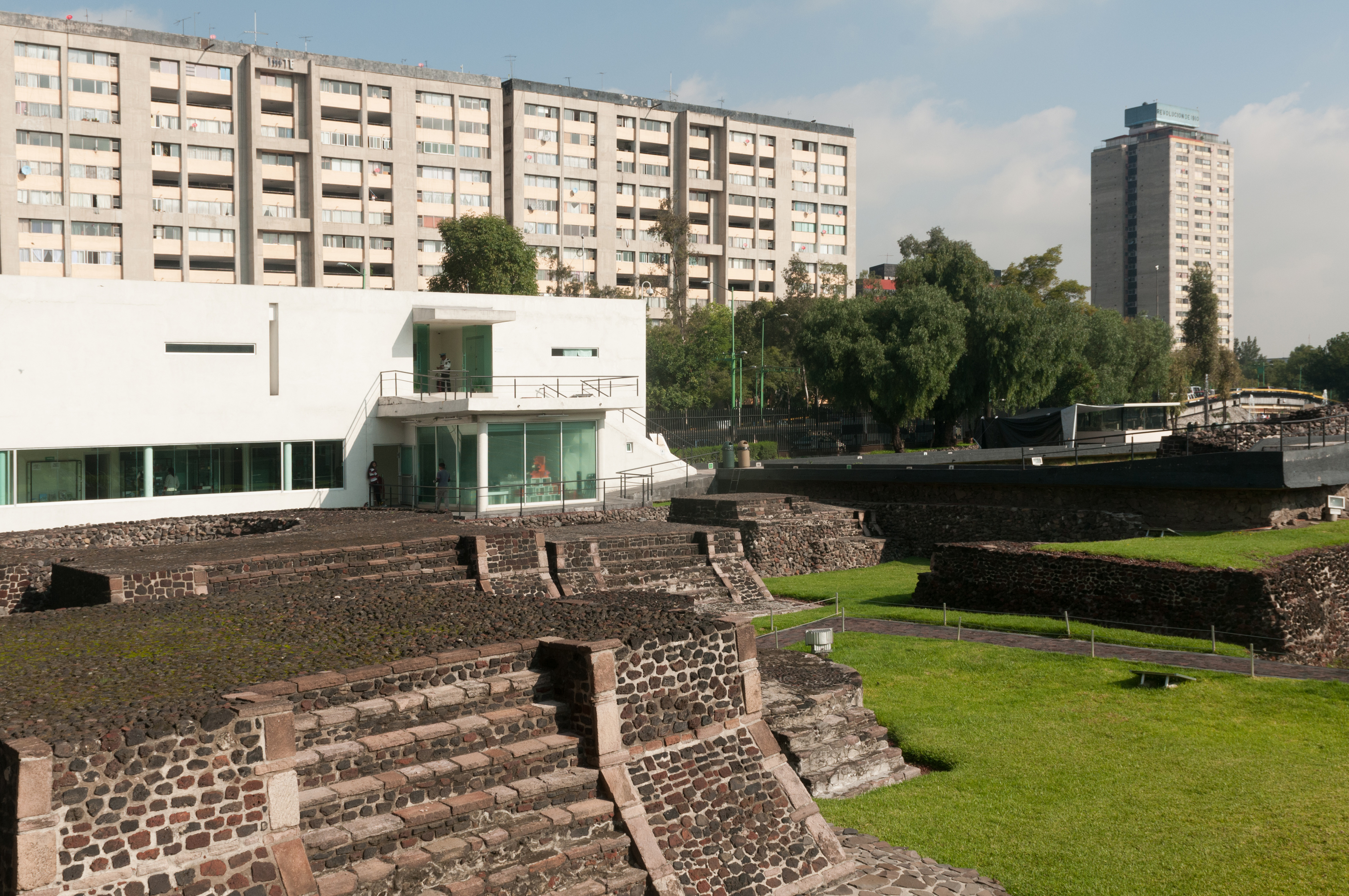
Plaza de las Tres Culturas

The Plaza de las Tres Culturas ("The Three Cultures square") is the main square within the Tlatelolco neighborhood of Mexico City. The name "Three Cultures" is in recognition of the three periods of Mexican history reflected by buildings in the square: pre-Columbian, Spanish colonial, and the independent nation. The square, designed by Mexican architect and urbanist Mario Pani, was completed in 1966.

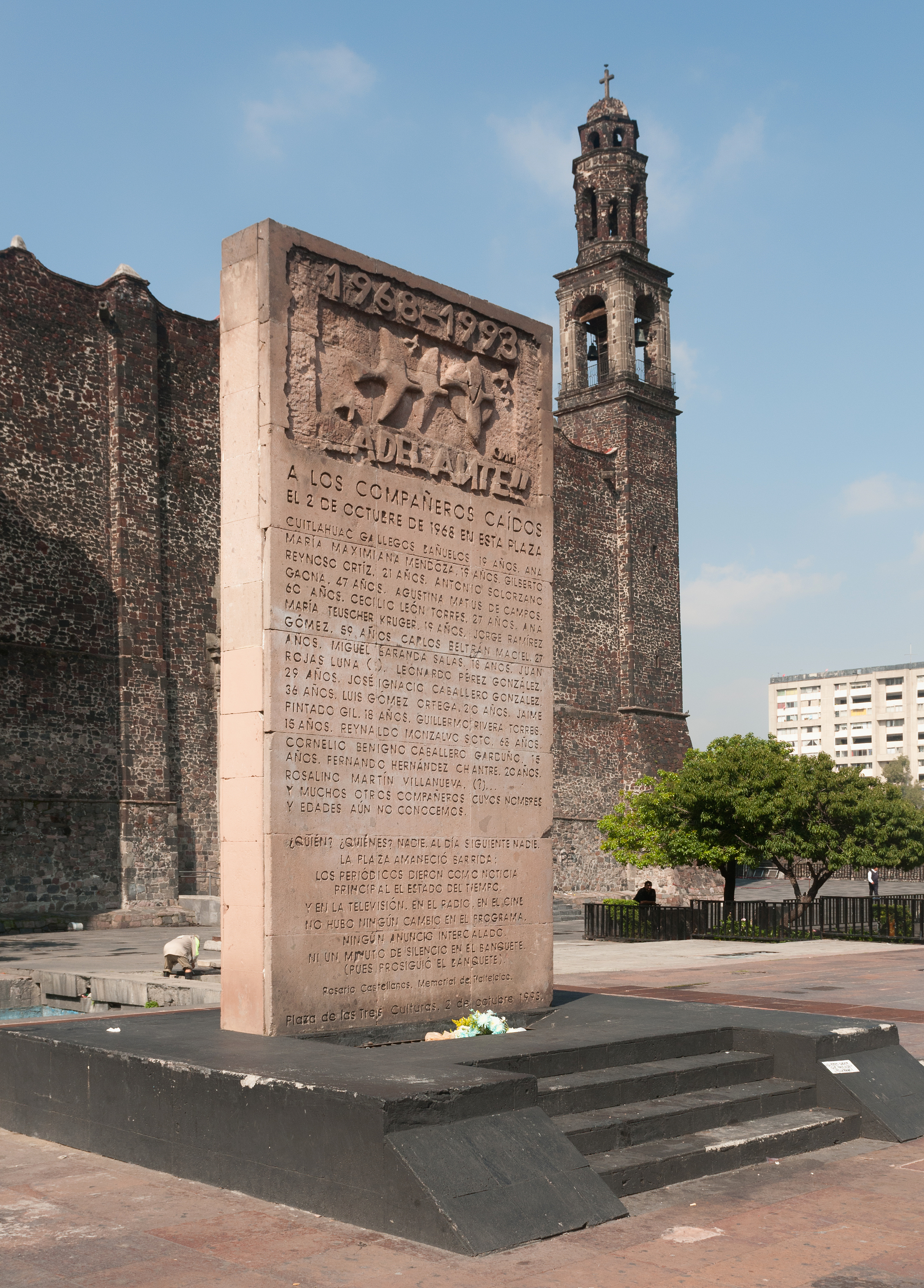
Monument to the Tlatelolco massacre in the Plaza de las Tres Culturas

The square contains the archaeological site of the city-state of Tlatelolco and is flanked by the oldest European school of higher learning in the Americas called the College of Santa Cruz de Tlatelolco (built in 1536 by friar Juan de Torquemada) and by a massive housing complex built in 1964.

The former headquarters of the Secretariat of Foreign Affairs (foreign ministry) also stands on the southern edge of the square. This headquarters now houses a memorial museum called "Memorial 68", opened by UNAM in October 2007, to remember the 1968 Mexican student demonstrations and the Tlatelolco Massacre victims and survivors. On the south side of the Plaza stands a large stone memorial erected on October 2, 1993, the 25th anniversary of the massacre, in memory of the hundreds killed.

== See also ==
- Unidad Habitacional Nonoalco-Tlatelolco
- Spanish Wikipedia: Memorial del 68−(in Spanish) — Google translation−(in English)
