= Fray Juan de Torquemada =

16/17th-century Spanish Franciscan friar and missionary in colonial Mexico

Juan de Torquemada
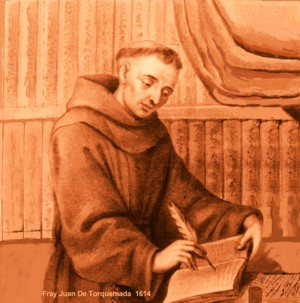
- Fray Juan de Torquemada, from Lucas Alamán's Historia de la República Mexicana (1860)
- Title: Minister Provincial, Province of Santo Evangelio, México

Personal life
- Born: Juan c. 1562 Torquemada, Palencia, Kingdom of Spain
- Died: 1624 (aged 61–62) convent of Tlatelolco, New Spain
- Notable work(s): architect, engineer, historian

Religious life
- Religion: Roman Catholic
- Order: Franciscan (1579–1624)
- Ordination: c. 1587

Senior posting
- Period in office: 1614-1617
- Successor: Juan López

Juan de Torquemada (c. 1562 – 1624) was a Franciscan friar, active as missionary in colonial Mexico and considered the "leading Franciscan chronicler of his generation." Administrator, engineer, architect and ethnographer, he is most famous for his monumental work commonly known as Monarquía indiana ("Indian Monarchy"), a survey of the history and culture of the indigenous peoples of New Spain together with an account of their conversion to Christianity, first published in Spain in 1615 and republished in 1723. Monarquia Indiana was the "prime text of Mexican history, and was destined to influence all subsequent chronicles until the twentieth century." It was used by later historians, the Franciscan Augustin de Vetancurt and most importantly by 18th-century Jesuit Francisco Javier Clavijero. No English translation of this work has ever been published.

== Life ==
=== Early years ===
There are few firm biographical details concerning Juan de Torquemada, most of which have to be deduced from his own work. Even basic information is subject to uncertainty and controversy. Born at Torquemada, Palencia, north central Spain, at an unknown date before 1566 (Miguel León-Portilla argues in detail for 1562) he was brought by his parents to New Spain probably while still a child. He took the Franciscan habit, as is generally agreed, in 1579, and pursued a course of studies in Latin, theology, philosophy and Nahuatl. Brief notices in his own works put him at the convent in Tlacopan in 1582 and (while still a youth) at the convent in Chiauhtla - the presumption being that these relate to his novitiate. It is uncertain if he began his studies at the convento mayor de San Francisco in Mexico City, but it is presumed that part at least of his studies were conducted while resident at the convent of Santiago, Tlatelolco. Among his teachers he names fray Juan Bautista (who taught him theology) and Antonio Valeriano (who taught him Nahuatl and whom he especially praised for his talents). At some time in the early 1580s he was sent by his superiors to Guatemala where he encountered the conquistador Bernal Díaz del Castillo. By 1584 he was certainly at the convent of San Francisco, where he assisted in the infirmary. The conjectured date of his priestly ordination is 1587 or 1588.

He is almost certain to have personally known other notable Franciscan friars who were his contemporaries and who were animated, as he was, by a profound interest in the pre-Hispanic life and culture of the conquered Indians in New Spain, especially Andrés de Olmos, Gerónimo de Mendieta, and Bernardino de Sahagún.

=== Missionary activity, 1588-1602 ===
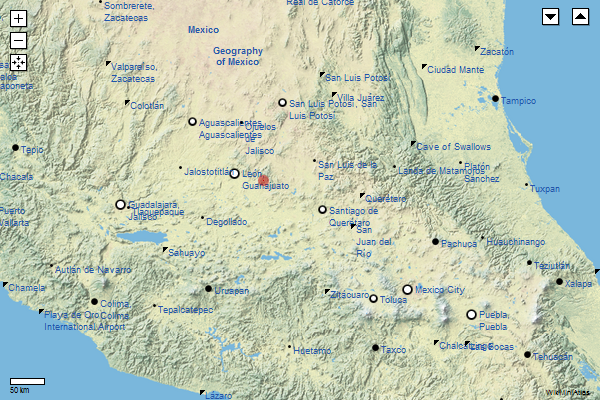
Map of central Mexico, the main area of Torquemada's activity

Shortly after ordination (which, in this period, was normally conferred on aspirant Franciscans at age 25), he was sent as a missionary to Nueva Galicia, a large territory in central western New Spain, the capital of which was Guadalajara and which extended north to Zacatecas and west to the Pacific. He is next heard of as guardian of the convent at Tlaxcala (east of Mexico City and north of Puebla), and although no dates can be assigned to his travels, at this time he is known to have been engaged in missionary work in the central region around Toluca (a town not far to the south-west of Mexico City) and at various places in Michoacán (an area west of Mexico City, extending to the Pacific).

Among his achievements during this phase of his life was his role as one of the founders of the Confraternity of Nuestra Señora de Soledad (Our Lady of Solitude), the indigenous members of which performed, on Sundays, edifying plays and scenes written in their own language by Torquemada for the purposes of inculcating in them and in spectators the Catholic faith.

In 1600 and 1601 (possibly in 1599 as well) he was guardian of the convent of Zacatlán (in the central highlands north-east of Mexico City). In 1602 he was guardian of the convent of Tulancingo. Then, in 1603, he was elected guardian of the convent of Santiago Tlatelolco, taking up his post there on 22 July; a post he held, it seems, for eight and a half years.

=== At Tlatelolco, 1603-1612 ===
While guardian of the convent at Tlatelolco, he assumed numerous heavy burdens, both intellectual and practical, not all of which related to the affairs of the Franciscans. Among those which did may be mentioned the fact that the guardian of the convent was ex officio President of the Colegio de Santa Cruz de Tlatelolco, a post which entailed general oversight of the conduct of the institution under its rector. The College had, however, so far declined from the ambitious plans which attended its ceremonial opening in 1536 that, by the end of the 16th century, it had become an elementary school where local Indian children learnt reading, writing, manners and good behaviour.

==== Administrator ====
In 1604 he visited Zacatecas to assist in the establishment of a Franciscan province to be headquartered there, and in 1606 he spent time in Michoacán and Jalisco for the same purpose - the establishment of a new province in Jalisco (headquartered in Guadalajara), carved out of the province of San Pedro y San Pablo covering Michoacán-Jalisco. A surge of vocations from among the criollos as well as a renewed influx of friars from Spain had necessitated a new alignment of responsibilities. A generation before (in 1570), numbers of friars in Nueva Galicia had fallen to 16, four of whom were elderly. In striking contrast to this long period of decline, in 1601 and 1602 alone, 14 friars had arrived from Spain destined for Nueva Galicia and 32 more for Zacatecas. Between 1610 and 1618 these numbers were augmented by another 40 arrivals.

==== Engineer ====
a contemporary painting showing Mexico City in 1628; the view east, overlooking Lake Texcoco

Abnormally high rainfall in August 1604 led to a devastating flood of Mexico City - one of several inundations from Lake Texcoco which sometimes took years to recede. The city was still virtually an island at this time. Other such inundations occurred in 1555, 1580, 1607 and 1629 resulting in the decision in 1629 (imperfectly implemented) to drain part of the lake. As an emergency measure, Viceroy Juan de Mendoza asked the Franciscan provincial to assign members of his Order to help in various urgent remedial works. Torquemada participated, specifically in the reconstruction of the calzadas (causeways) of Los Misterios (leading north-east to Guadalupe – works which took five months of continuous activity to complete, employing thousands of labourers) and of that leading west to Chapultepec. When these works were finished, the friars organised the cleaning of the main drains of the city. It was only through the friars' petitioning the Viceroy that he ordered the labourers to be paid and fed at government expense.

==== Architect ====
Commencing in 1604, Torquemada took in hand the construction of a new church of Santiago de Tlatelolco, a project which had been stalled for many years. He reported that it proceeded in great part thanks to contributions in cash and kind by local Indians, many of whom donated their labour. It is notable for the massive bases of the towers flanking the main entrance, designed to resist earthquake.

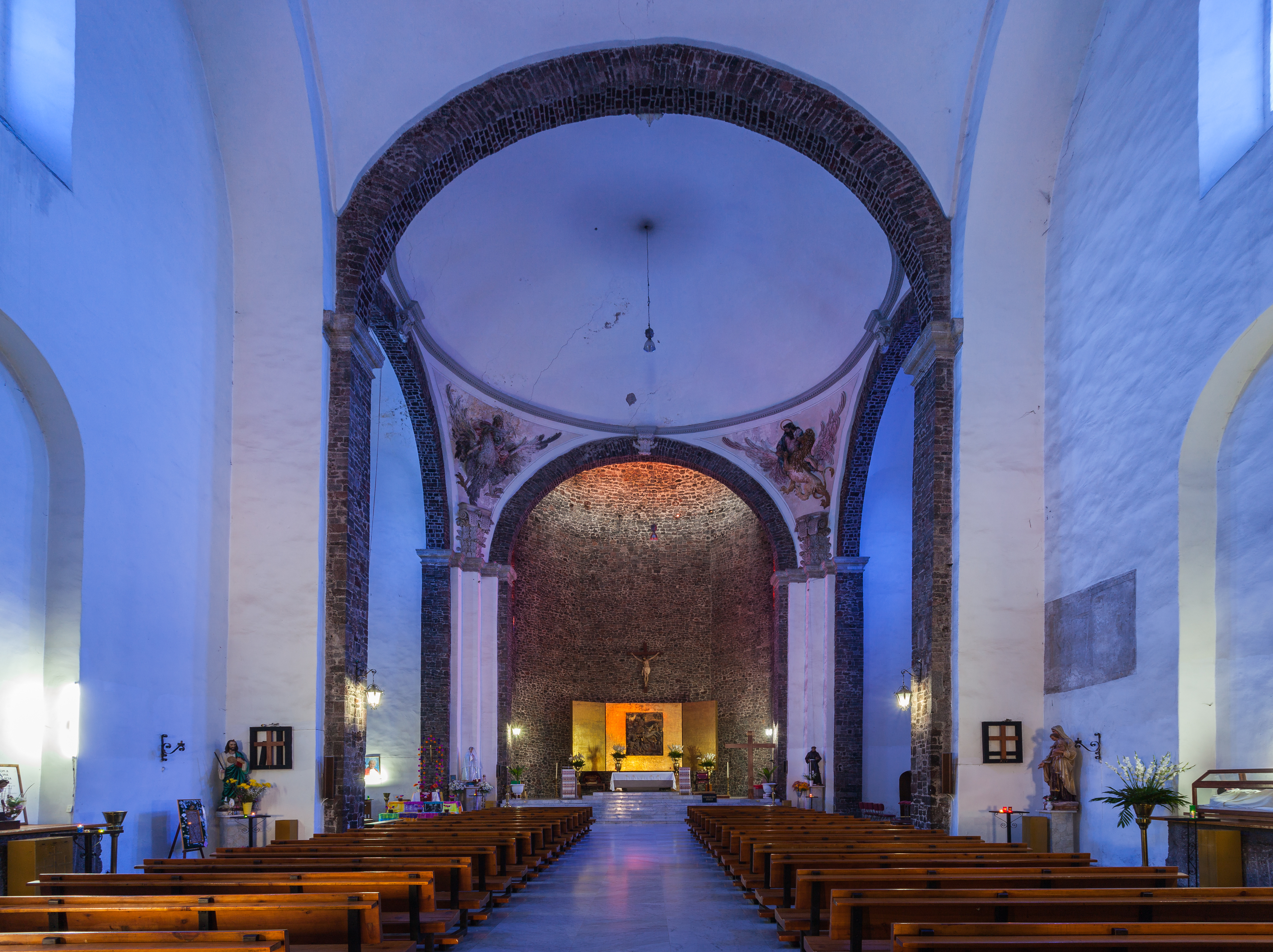
Interior of the church of Santiago de Tlatelolco

The work was completed in 1609 or 1610, and on 14 July 1610 the church was consecrated. It was built in the form of a Latin cross with a series of shallow domes in the vault over the nave and a large dome over the crossing, with a semi-dome over the apse. The following day, on Sunday 15 July 1610 (the feast of Santiago) the altarpiece or retablo behind the high altar was inaugurated. This sumptuous structure was arranged in four registers with an apex. It was decorated with 14 paintings by the celebrated Basque painter Baltasar de Echave Orio (who is also credited with designing the retablo), alternating with carved wooden statues standing in niches. At the centre of the second register, directly above the later neo-classic ciborium (presumptively installed in the first decades of the 19th century and visible in a 19th-century lithograph which shows the arrangement of the retablo), was a carved and painted panel in high relief of the patron saint of the church, Santiago Matamoros, the only part of the retablo that has survived. Torquemada applauded the skill of the Indian craftsmen and singled out for praise one of those who worked on the retablo, Miguel Mauricio, calling him an artist second to none among the Spanish.

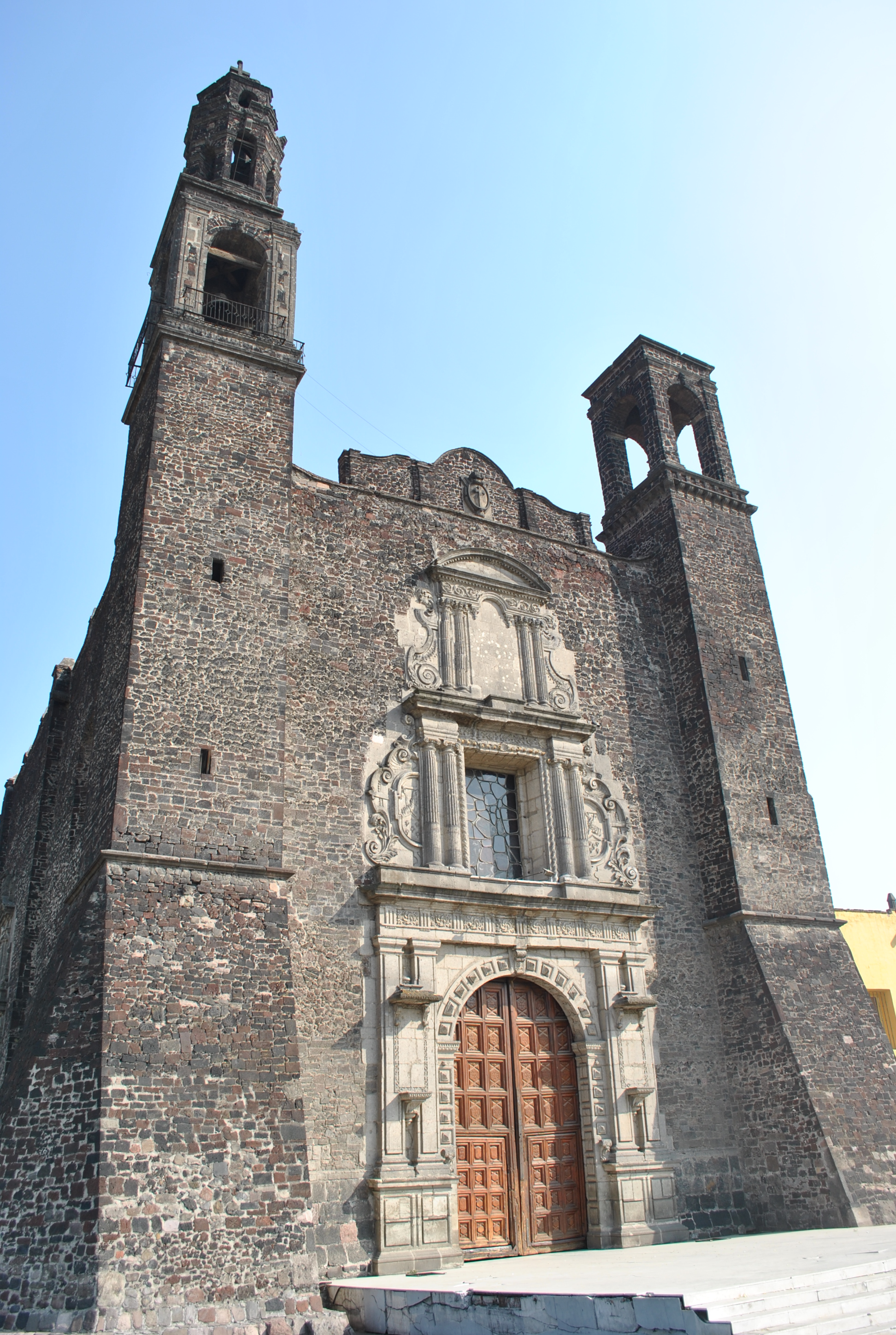
Western façade of church of Santiago de Tlatelolco

Most of the decoration of the church was either removed by the civil authorities, looted, damaged or destroyed during the turmoil of the era of La Reforma in the mid-19th century. The church then became a customs warehouse, and as late as 1944 the convent was a military gaol; but the use of the church has since been restored to the Franciscans and the Santiago panel has been returned to its original location on the wall above the altar.

A curious episode attaches to the building of the church. Allegations were made that Torquemada had exploited and abused the Indian workforce and had severely beaten one particular labourer "almost to death" (a punto de muerte). An official investigation was initiated by the Archbishop of México on 16 February 1605, but there is no record of the outcome and there was no interruption to Torquemada's work on the church.

==== Historian ====
It was while he was guardian of the convent of Tlatelolco that Torquemada also put in hand the organisation of the materials he had been gathering for many years previously, and (between 1605 and 1612) their redaction into the great work he had been projecting - the history of the aboriginal nations of New Spain, and their conquest and evangelisation by the Spanish. In addition to the voluminous unpublished writings of other Franciscans to which he had unimpeded access, Torquemada possessed many original documents acquired during his missionary work, as well as the oral testimony he had obtained from people he had encountered on his various travels. In 1609 he had been named chronicler of the Franciscan Order by Fray Bernardo de Salva, Franciscan Commissary General of the Indies. On completion of the work he took the manuscript to Spain in order to oversee its publication (as to which see below).

=== Last years, 1613-1624 ===
On 8 January 1614, in the year following his return from Spain, Torquemada was elected provincial of the province of the Holy Gospel (del Santo Evangelio de México) a post he held for the usual three-year term until the election of a successor on 14 January 1617. At that time the province of the Holy Gospel comprised México City, the modern State of México, and the State of Puebla, together with the custodia of Tampico on the Gulf Coast. In an ongoing dispute over the division of elective posts within the province conducted between the criollos (ethnic Spaniards born in New Spain) and the peninsulares (those born in Spain but who had emigrated to New Spain), Torquemada identified himself not as a peninsular (which he could justly claim to be) but as a member of an intermediate group of men who came out to New Spain in their childhood and regarded themselves as hijos de la provincia (sons of the province). The dispute became especially bitter under Torquemada's successor as provincial Juan López, a peninsular, with respect to whom Torquemada expressed deep-seated hostility, accusing him in private correspondence (two letters written in October 1620 to a former confrère of his, then resident in Spain) of being a liar and an hombre sin Dios (a man without God), and asserting that Hell held no man worse or more false (este mal hombre de fray Juan López . . digo que otro peor no lo tiene el infierno ni más falso).

At the age of 62 or thereabouts, Torquemada died suddenly on New Year's Day, 1624, in choir in the convent at Tlatelolco after having sung matins with the community at midnight. He had apparently been in good health. The cause of death was likely a heart attack, given that an indigenous witness said he said "Help me, unloose my chest where my heart is." He died in the presence of his brother friars and of the guardian of the convent of San Francisco. His body was conducted in solemn procession from Tlatelolco to Mexico City accompanied by many mourners who paused at seven places on the way in order to sing responses. On arrival at the church of San Francisco (the mother church of the province), it was interred in the sanctuary, on the right-hand side near the high altar.

== Literary works ==
=== Monarquía indiana ===
==== Introduction ====
By way of providing impetus to and official sanction for Torquemada's history, fray Bernardo Salva, the Comisario general de Indias (acting by specific direction from his immediate superior, Arcángelo de Messina, the minister general of the Order) wrote a letter dated 6 April 1609 from Madrid, in which he gave written authority and instructions to Torquemada to compile a chronicle of the life and work of the members of the Franciscan Order active in New Spain, as well as a wide-ranging account of the history and culture of the peoples they had evangelised. For that purpose, as Salva wrote, Torquemada was to utilise the voluminous historical and ethnographic writings of his fellow Franciscans (now, all of them dead) to which he had access, almost nothing of which had by then been published: works by Andrés de Olmos, Gerónimo de Mendieta, Motolinía, and Bernardino de Sahagún. Of these, only de Mendieta was mentioned by name by Salva. He also heavily excerpted the works of Carmelite friar Antonio de la Ascensión.

The work is a "remarkably dense text," because of its theological digressions, contradictions, and anachronisms, since Torquemada incorporated material without resolving contradictory and competing points of view from his sources. In addition to the texts written by Spaniards, Torquemada draws on the work of mestizo Tlaxcala patriot Diego Muñoz Camargo, and Texcoco indigenous nobility Fernando Alva Ixtlilxochitl, Juan Bautista Pomar, and Antonio de Pimentel, and the account of the conquest from the Tlatelolco point of view compiled by Bernardino de Sahagún. He incorporates a large quantity of information taken from indigenous pictographs and manuscripts. Torquemada interviewed elderly indigenous people about their ancestors and recorded their oral traditions. The Monarquía indiana is the best work on what was known of the indigenous past at the beginning of the seventeenth century. It is considered an especially important source on the Mexica, Totonac, Pipil and Nicoya cultures.

At the time of its publication, Torquemada referred to his history under the abbreviated title Libros rituales y monarquía indiana or Monarquía y historia indiana, but others were already calling it the Monarquía indiana, the name by which it has generally been known ever since.

==== Vision of history and purpose of the work ====
The leading motif of Torquemada's monumental history – elaborated by him in many places, especially in the general prologue to the entire work – can be characterised as the merciful action of Divine Providence in choosing the Spanish to liberate the Indians from their subjection to the Devil who had deceived these innocent peoples into practising a religion marred by errors and polluted by abominations such as human sacrifice. On this interpretation the fall of the Aztec monarchy was a Divine chastisement and Spain the rod. But, for all that, Torquemada was sympathetic to the positive achievements of the Indians, and, by situating their history and culture within the framework of the Old Testament and of the former glories of the empires of Egypt, Greece and Rome, he encouraged the educated elite of the Old World to recognise the indigenous nations of the New World as their peers. His history was, of set purpose, a laborious inquiry into the truth of things, requiring (as he says in his general prologue) diligence, maturation, and the exercise of prudence in adjudicating among conflicting testimonies. It was not written as an entertainment or to satisfy mere curiosity, but with a serious didactic purpose and to edify, for he believed that the record of the events of the past constitute not only an antidote to human mortality and the brevity of life, but also a hermeneutic key to understanding the present, thereby offering man an opportunity to progress.

==== Method ====
The distinguished scholar and administrator, Howard F. Cline, who, at the time of his death was Director of the Hispanic Foundation of the Library of Congress in Washington D.C. gave, in 1969, this positive assessment of Torquemada's skill as an historian :-

Historians generally see their tasks broken into three main stages: as comprehensive as possible collection of relevant documentation, followed by critical and evaluative appraisal of it, and finally, a synthesis based on verified data. Contrary to a considerable body of hostile secondary discussion, critical examination of Juan de Torquemada's Monarquía Indiana indicates a surprisingly high level of workmanship in at least the first two phases. Although what he strove for in synthesis – an accurate record that would place native Mexican cultures on a par with ancient, classical, and for him modern societies – is an early and interesting example of a comparative approach, the classical and Biblical citations he employed for such comparisons are now largely of curiosity value, except as clues to his own ambience and personal outlook.

Torquemada was a skilled and careful historian, constrained only by some obvious usages and common attitudes of his age.

Like others of his time, he puzzled over the problems of fitting native peopling of the New World and their development into a Biblical framework, and seldom doubted authenticity of miracles, or the Providential intervention which accounted for Cortes' Conquest as an expression of Divine Will. But for the most part he went at his tasks with professional coolness, and a rather high degree of historiographical craftsmanship.

==== Subject-matter ====
Salva's letter of 6 April 1609 itself expressed the full ambit of Torquemada's work as eventually written, including, as regards the converted Indians: "their rituals, ceremonies, laws, governments and governors, their mode of conservation and conversation, their kings, kingdoms, cities and domains, their origin and beginnings, their division into provinces and kingdoms [sic]; the diversity of their languages, their riches and means of sustenance, their gods and worship, and, with great particularity, the manner in which friars and ministers initially converted them and how they have followed up on those conversions . . ."

The work was published in three hefty volumes under a title which gives a precise conspectus of its subject-matter and author: LOS VEINTE IUN LIBROS RITUALES I MONARCHIA Indiana con el origen y guerras de los Indios Ocidentales, de sus Poblaçones, Descubrimiento, Conquista, Conversion y otras cosas maravillosas de la mesma [sic] tierra discribuydos en tres tomos. COMPUESTO POR F. JUAN DE TORQUEMADA Ministro Provincial de la Orden de Nuestro Serafico Padre, San Francisco En la Provincia del Santo Evangelio de Mexico en la Nueva Espana.

The first volume comprises five books which principally treat of the creation of the world and the origin of the peoples who occupied New Spain (I, II), as well as the diverse nations constituting the Aztec Empire (III), followed by its conquest by the Spanish (IV) and its subsequent re-organisation (V). To the second volume were assigned nine books which deal with the religion (VI-X), government (XI), laws (XII), institutions (XIII) and social and military life of the indigenous peoples together with remarks on various geographical features and their cultural relevance (XIV). The subject of the seven books which constitute the third volume is the evangelisation of the Indians, with particular focus (especially in the last three books) upon the life, work and fate of Franciscan missionaries.

The main focus is on the history and culture of the peoples of what is now central Mexico, with particular attention given to Texcoco, Azcapotzalco, Tlaxcala, Tlatelolco, and Tenochtitlan as well as the Totonacs living further east, towards the Gulf of Mexico. Nevertheless, the work also includes among its subjects other peoples living in Central America (Honduras and Guatemala), in the Caribbean, and in North and South America (specifically: Florida, New Mexico, Venezuela, Colombia, the Andean civilisations, and even parts of Brasil).

Torquemada describes the 1576 epidemic in New Spain in the following terms:

In the year 1576 a great mortality and pestilence that lasted for more than a year overcame the Indians. It was so big that it ruined and destroyed almost the entire land. The place we know as New Spain was left almost empty.

He reported that two million, mostly indigenous, people died, according to a survey conducted by Viceroy Don Martín Enríquez de Almanza.

==== Sources ====
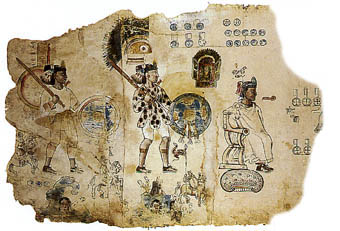
Fragment of a pictograph (known as a "codex") similar to the prehispanic historical materials utilised for the Monarquía indiana

The great diversity of sources employed by Torquemada, including precious indigenous documents now lost as well as colonial texts (published and unpublished), is fully laid out in exhaustive tables of analysis for each of the books in volume 7 of the IIH critical edition, following extensive study by the research seminar conducted under the leadership of Miguel León-Portilla between 1969 and 1971.

At the end of the 17th century a charge of plagiarism was raised by fray Agustín de Vetancur who claimed that Torquemada had published under his own name the Historia eclesiástica indiana, a history written by Jerónimo de Mendieta which had never been published, but the manuscript of which had been entrusted by Mendieta to Juan Bautista and by him to Torquemada. The accusation was rejected by Rodrígues Franco in his Proemio to the second edition of Monarquía indiana, but it was taken up by the famous Mexican historian Joaquín García Icazbalceta in the 19th century after acquiring the manuscript of Mendieta's work which he published in 1870, pointing out the areas of exact correspondence between both works. One 20th century scholar considered the charge to be:-

. . not completely justified in view of the fact that Torquemada was ordered by his superiors to use all historical works available and that politically speaking it was desirable that the Monarquía indiana should not be too closely identified with the Historia eclesiástica indiana, lest the oblivion of the latter overtake the former.

The various ways in which the accusation has been made are discussed in Gurría Lacroix' essay ("Acusación de plagiario") in volume 7 of the IIH edition. As Woodrow Borah put it in his review:-

Jorge Gurría Lacroix, who died before this volume appeared, examines at considerable length the old charge of plagiarism raised against Fray Juan in his use particularly of Mendieta's chronicle, and by doing so, of Mendieta in his use of Motoliniá's writing. The charges are disposed of, one hopes definitively, by making clear the customs of the time and the specific instructions to Torquemada from his Order. Chronicles were regarded as community property to be used as the Order decided.

The charge occasionally resurfaces, even if only obliquely and by association. Almost the entirety of Mendieta's history is reproduced throughout the course of Books 15-21 of the Monarquía indiana (where it comprises about 80% of the text), but in the general prologue Torquemada acknowledged his use of prior writings by Francisco Ximénez, Motolinía, Sahagún, and Mendieta, and 66 specific references are made to Mendieta in the course of the work (only 36 of which have been identified). Nevertheless, Torquemada indisputably used these sources far more extensively than he gave credit for.

==== Publication ====
Once the work was in its final shape, Torquemada took the manuscript to Spain personally, despite the Comisario general de Indias (Bernardo Salva) having previously invited him to send it. Precise dates for the trip are not known, but the termini within which the trip must have occurred can be stated with confidence. Among the documents Torquemada took to Spain with him were the various permits relative to the printing of the book which were issued in México, the latest of which (the licence proper) was dated 17 May 1612. Back in Mexico, he officiated at a wedding in Xochimilco (where he was now guardian) on 10 October 1613. In between, he can be presumptively placed in Madrid on and before 4 February 1613 and again, on and before 5 May of the same year, those being the dates when written approval for the printing was granted by two officials resident in that city, who stated they had read and approved the manuscript.

The first edition was printed by Mathias Clavijo in Seville in 1615; that is, two years after Torquemada had returned to Mexico, so his presence in Seville can only have been to select and arrange matters with the printer, and not to oversee the actual printing or check the galley-proofs. León-Portilla suggests these arrangements (including the choice of type and the layout) might have taken weeks at most, giving Torquemada time to visit Madrid and other places in the land of his birth. That no doubt explains how it happened that the first edition lacked two passages present in the manuscript, as well as words from some of the chapter headings, and contained countless other mistakes which the printer of the second edition noted but did not specify in his Proemio. Despite the blemishes which marred the body of the first edition, the printer of the second edition was unstinting in his praise of the analytic indices which, he said, greatly enriched the text. According to a modern commentator, expressing also the hope that similar works would not omit a scientific apparatus of this kind, "their usefulness and erudition are formidable".

==== Dedication ====
Exceptionally, in the Carta nuncupatoria Torquemada dedicated his book to God – a la Sacratísima Magestad del Rey del Cielo, Dios Nuestro Señor (to the Sacred Majesty of the King of Heaven, God Our Lord) – explaining at length why he did so. As he well knew, the normal dedication of such works was to the King of Spain, to nobles, or to ecclesiastical dignitaries (usually the patrons of the author). The title page announces the same dedication: Dico Ego Opera Mea Regi. Saeculorum Inmortali et Invisibili.

==== Diffusion ====
Although (as noted in the following sub-section) the greater part of the print-run of the first edition was said to have been lost in a shipwreck, the Monarquía indiana was known in Mexico as early as 1624 when it was first cited in a book published there in that year. Between then and 1714 (that is to say, before the second edition) it was cited, even copiously on occasion, by at least eleven authors in works published for the most part in Mexico, but also in Madrid and Guatemala.

==== Subsequent history of the text ====
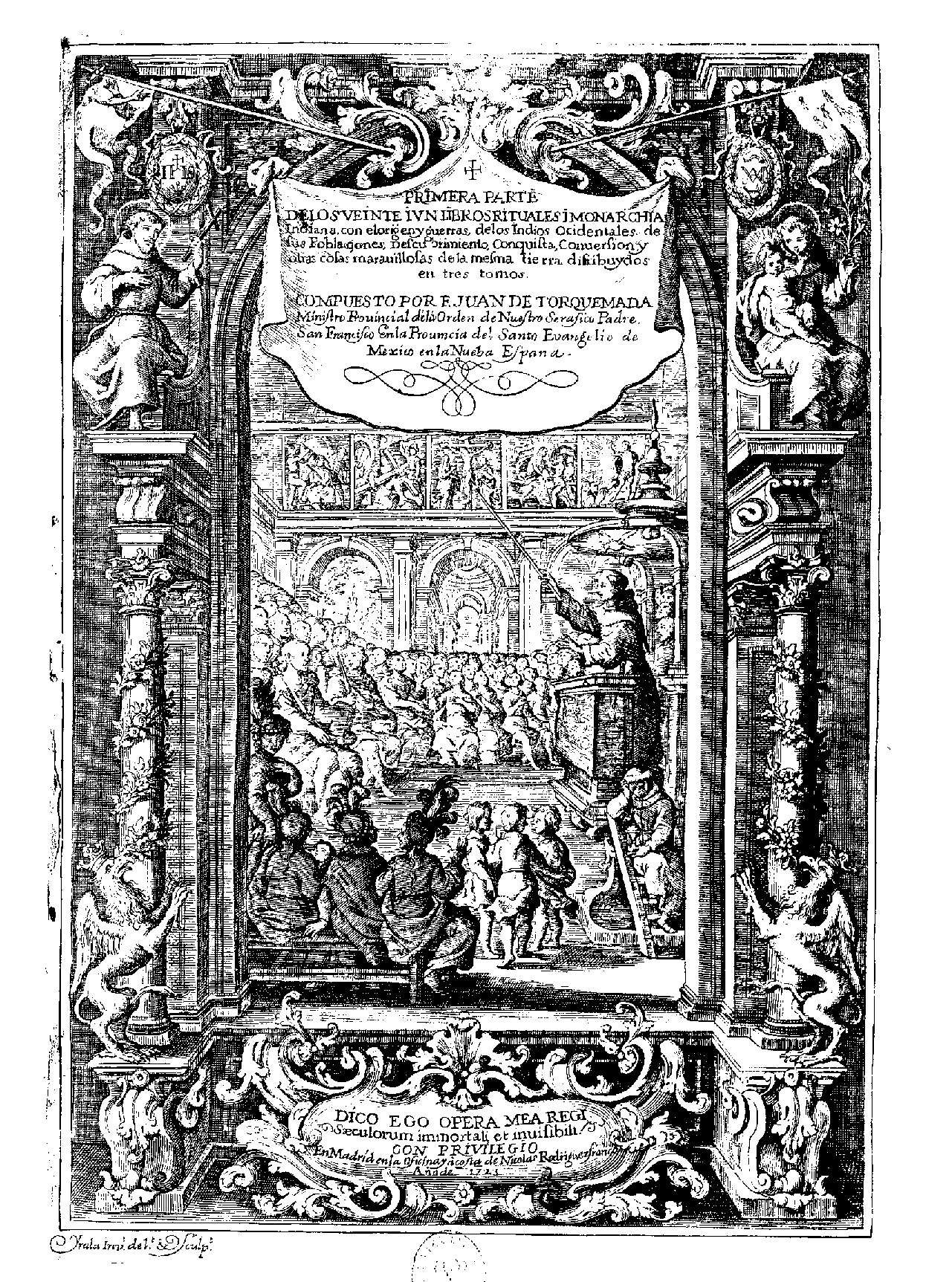
Title page of the second edition of Monarquía indiana, by Fray Juan de Torquemada, printed in three volumes in Madrid, 1723 (1725)

The fate of the first edition, and details of the two subsequent facsimile reprints, are stated here as given in the essay "Ediciones" by Jorge Gurría Lacroix in volume 7 of the IIH critical edition.

As Nicolás Rodríguez Franco, the printer of the second edition, informed his readers in his Proemio, few exemplars of the first edition survive because the greater part of the print-run was lost in a shipwreck, and only three copies were known to him. Eight copies of the first edition exist in various libraries in North America and Europe, two of which lack the original frontispiece, and the other six of which lack also the first 32 pages. A ninth copy exists in Mexico divided between one owner who possesses the first volume, and another who possesses the other two.

The errors and omissions were made good in the second edition by reference to the original manuscript which, so Franco discloses, was in the library of Don Andrés González de Barcia. The second edition has the date 1723 on the title page, but the Proemio itself is dated 20 January 1725, so the effective publication date must have been later than that.

A third edition (a new facsimile reprint rather than a new edition) was printed in Mexico in 1943 by Salvador Chávez Hayhoe. The only addition was a title-page identifying the data relevant to the reprint.

The fourth edition, published by Editorial Porrúa in Mexico in 1969 with an Introduction by Miguel León-Portilla, was another facsimile reprint of the second edition, but, this time, employing a magnificent large paper exemplar formerly owned by the Mexican historian Joaquín García Icazbalceta.

The fifth edition (substantively, the third, critical edition) was published by the Instituto de Investigaciones Históricas (IIH), a research institute of the National Autonomous University of Mexico (UNAM), in seven volumes between 1975 and 1983. A research team was assembled under the direction of Miguel León-Portilla with the task of establishing the text (without, however, the benefit of the original manuscript, which could not be located) and of publishing it in six volumes, with (among other materials) analytic indices tracking Torquemada's sources. The decision was taken to modernise the orthography and punctuation in order to facilitate reading. Members of the team wrote various scholarly studies relevant to Torquemada and the Monarquía indiana, which were published in 1983 as volume 7 to the series. Since 2010, this edition had been available online.

==== Critical appraisal of the work ====
Until the publication of Mendieta's Historia eclesiástica indiana in 1870, Torquemada's work was held in high esteem but, thereafter, Icazbalceta's prestige combined with his vigorous denunciation of Torquemada's supposed plagiarism of his predecessor's previously unknown History, caused the Monarquía indiana to fall into disrepute, and many commentators disparaged its method, content, and style. From the middle of the 20th century, the work of numerous scholars has gone far to rehabilitating Torquemada and re-assessing the significance of the Monarquía indiana. According to John Leddy Phelan, writing in 1956 (second edition revised, 1970):-

For the historian of ideas the Monarquía indiana deserves to be restored to a position of eminence as one of the classic sources of colonial historiography.

In the opinion of Alcina Franch (1969):-

"Neither the ponderous and erudite digressions . . nor the supposed plagiarism . . can obscure the genuine value of Torquemada's work; that is, his extraordinary assemblage of materials available at the end of the 16th century for tracing the ancient and contemporary history of Mexico, unwittingly salvaging numerous old sources, reports, oral traditions, etc., which, without him, would have been forever lost beyond recall." (translation from the Spanish original)

More recently, it has been said (1996):-

La importancia de la obra de Torquemada no ha sido debidamente reconocida por parte de los especialistas, pero aquellos que la han estudiado en profundidad coinciden en hacer una valoración muy positiva. (The importance of Torquemada's work has not been properly recognised by specialists, but those who have given it deep study concur in a very positive appraisal)

And (2002):-

Torquemada's work was more than a censored version of Mendieta's . . With his study, indigenous culture - more particularly the Nahuatl - was inserted into the context of universal civilisation on a par with Greece, Rome and Egypt . . More than an historical text, Torquemada's work is a theological speculation developed in order to explain, within a western philosophical framework, the existence of the American Indians and the role that their conquest and evangelisation play in the context of the history of salvation. (translation from the Spanish original)

As for the author's style, opinions diverge. A judicious and broadly positive assessment such as this was made in 1890 by the American historian and ethnologist Hubert Howe Bancroft:-

He rises above the mere monk chronicler and strives to interest his readers by variety of topics, as well as by treatment, which receives no inconsiderable aid from a descriptive power of rare occurrence among his confreres; other faults remain, however. While concise enough in the narrative generally, he abandons himself to inappropriate deviations and wordy argument, and revels in learned references.

By contrast, a non-specialist (who thought Torquemada arrived in New Spain in 1583 and made other elementary mistakes about his life in the few sentences he devoted to it) offered this observation which can be taken to be representative of the opposite tendency:-

The value of Monarquia Indiana as a history of prehispanic Mexico and of its conquest by Cortes is marginal. This hodgepodge of facts and fiction and of a few interesting details lost in tedious disquisitions is important for other reasons. . . The merit of Torquemada, if merit it be, is the fact that in his compilation he quoted [..] unpublished chronicles, sometimes mentioning the names of their authors, sometimes plundering parts of their work for his Monarquía Indiana, thus saving them from oblivion. Torquemada's plagiarism of Jeronimo de Mendieta's work . . part of which he included in his pot-pourri without any change, proved very useful to Joaquín García Icazbalceta [etc.]

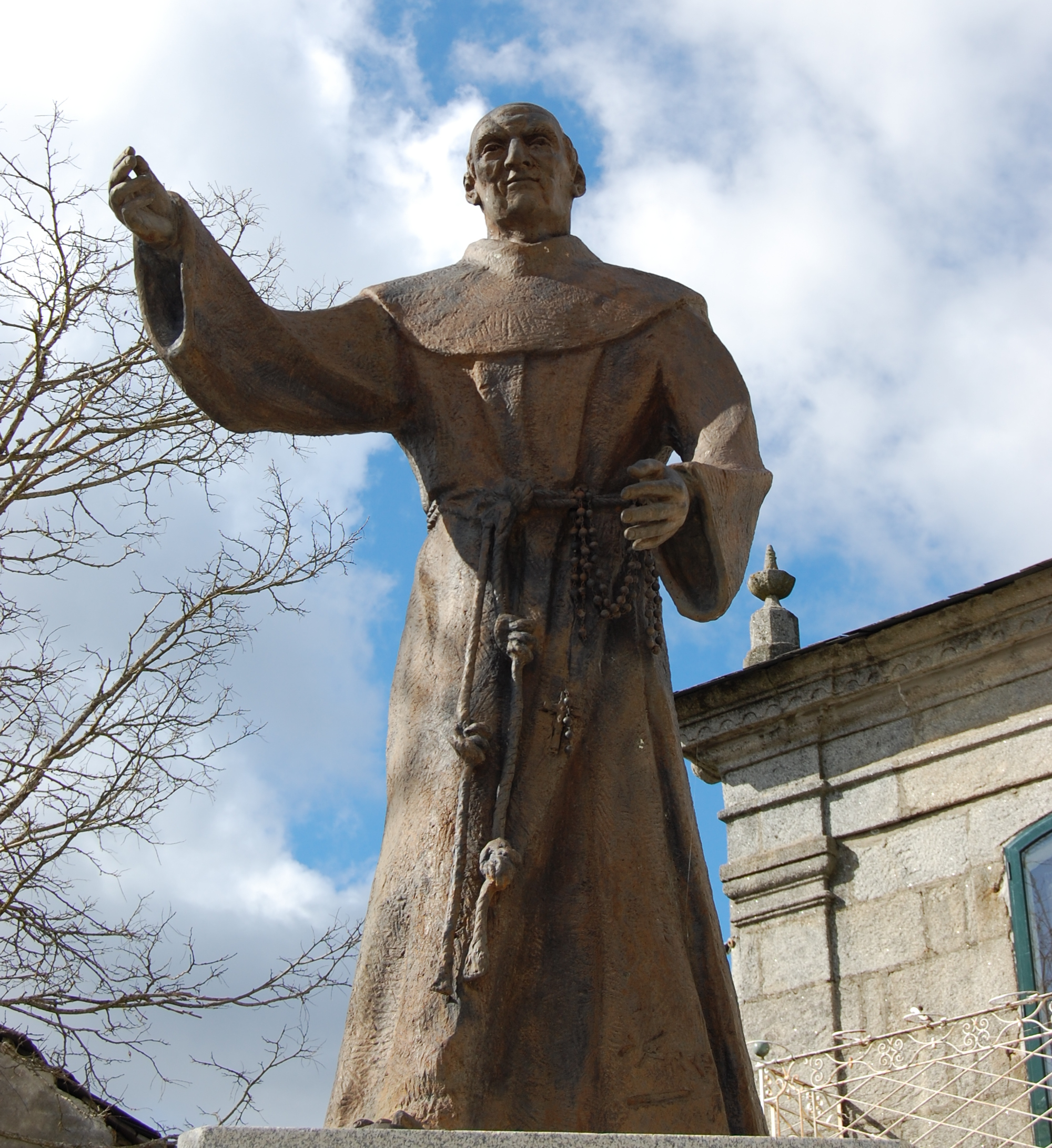
A statue of Blessed Sebastian in A Gudiña

=== Minor works ===
One other work published in his lifetime is known, a hagiography of fray Sebastián de Aparicio, a Franciscan lay brother who had died on 25 February 1600 and whose reputation of exemplary living resulted in his beatification in 1789. Known by its shortened title Vida y milagros del santo confesor de Cristo, fray Sebastián de Aparicio (The Life and Miracles of the Holy Confessor of Christ, Friar Sebastián de Aparicio), it was printed in 1602 by Diego López Dávalos at the presses of the Colegio de Santa Cruz de Tlatelolco, and in Seville in 1605.

Torquemada himself mentioned playlets or scenes ("comedias o reprecentaciones") he had written in Nahuatl for members of the Confraternity of Our Lady of Soledad to perform at the chapel of San José de los naturales, a large mostly open space adjacent to the main Franciscan church of San Francisco de México which could accommodate thousands of persons. None of these pieces have survived.

Other writings include two unpublished letters found in the General Archive of the Indies in Seville (dating from 1620), and two long apologetic "Statements" (or alegatos, dating from 1621) eventually published by Icazbalceta. These argue - one from a theological and canonical perspective, the other from a historical perspective - that members of the three Mendicant orders then active in New Spain should not be subjected to examination by the diocesan bishops

== See also ==
- List of Spanish chroniclers of the Indies

== Sources ==
- Alcina Franch, José (1973). "Juan de Torquemada". In Cline, Howard F. (ed.). Handbook of Middle American Indians, Guide to Ethnohistorical Sources (Part 2). Vol. 13. Austin: University of Texas Press. pp. 256–275. ISBN 978-0-292-70153-3.

–El descubrimiento científico de América. Barcelona: Editorial Anthropos. 1988. (Spanish version, originally published in 1969, of the chapter in the 1973 Handbook)

- Arroyo, Salvador Guilliem Iglesia de Santiago de Tlatelolco, 1 and Iglesia de Santiago de Tlatelolco, 2, companion articles posted on the website of Instituto nacional de antropología y historia (INAH), a research institute of UNAM, accessed 12 January 2014
- Bancroft, Hubert Howe (1890). Works, Essays and Miscellany. Vol. 38. San Francisco: The History Company Publishers.
- Boban, Eugène (1891). Documents pour servir à l'histoire du Mexique (in French). Paris.
- Brading, D. A. (1991). The First America: The Spanish Monarchy, Creole Patriots, and the Liberal State 1492-1867. New York: Cambridge University Press.
- Carman, Glen (2006). Rhetorical conquests: Cortés, Gómara, and Renaissance Imperialism. Purdue Studies in Romance Literatures. Vol. 35. Purdue University Press.
- Castañeda de la Paz, María (2008). "El Códice X o Los anales del 'Grupo de la Tira de la Peregrinación'. Copias, Duplicaciones y su uso por parte de los cronistas". Tlalocan (Revista de Fuentes Para el Conocimiento de las Culturas Indígenas de México). XV. UNAM: 183–214.
- Cline, Howard, F. (1969). "A Note on Torquemada's Native Sources and Historiographical Methods". The Americas. 25 (4): 372–386. doi:10.2307/980319. JSTOR 980319. S2CID 146935548.
- "Torquemada, Juan de". ENCICLOPEDIA DE MEXICO (in Spanish). Vol. 13. Mexico City. 1996. 1-56409-016-7.
- Estarellas, Juan (1962). "The College of Tlatelolco and the Problem of Higher Education for Indians in 16th Century Mexico". History of Education Quarterly. 2 (4): 234–243. doi:10.2307/367072. JSTOR 367072. S2CID 147210540., Vol. 2, No. 4 (Dec., 1962), pp. 234–243
- Foin, Charles (1977). "Le crise de l'apostolat franciscain en Nouvelle-Galice (Mexique) 1570-1580". Mélanges de la Casa de Velázquez. 13: 219–234. doi:10.3406/casa.1977.2249.
- García Icazbalceta, Joaquín (1853–56). "Torquemada, Juan de". Diccionario universal de historia y geografía (in Spanish).
- Gurría Lacroix, Jorge (1983). "La accusación de plagiario". Fray Juan de Torquemada, Monarquía indiana. Vol. 7. Mexico City: Instituto de Investigaciones Históricas (IIH), Universidad Nacional Autónoma de México (UNAM). pp. 57–68.

–"Bibliografía sobre fray Juan de Torquemada". Fray Juan de Torquemada, Monarquía indiana. Vol. 7. Mexico City: Instituto de Investigaciones Históricas (IIH), Universidad Nacional Autónoma de México (UNAM). 1983. pp. 455–465.
–"Ediciones de la Monarquía indiana". Fray Juan de Torquemada, Monarquía indiana. Vol. 7. Mexico City: Instituto de Investigaciones Históricas (IIH), Universidad Nacional Autónoma de México (UNAM). 1983. pp. 467–470.

- Habig, Marion (1944). "The Franciscan Provinces of Spanish North America [Continued]". The Americas. 1: 88–96. doi:10.2307/978338. JSTOR 978338. S2CID 251411991. Vol. 1, No. 2
- Hoberman, Louisa (1974). "Bureaucracy and Disaster: Mexico City and the Flood of 1629". Journal of Latin American Studies. 6 (2 (Nov., 1974)): 211–230. doi:10.1017/S0022216X00008968. S2CID 145774918.
- León-Portilla, Miguel (1983). "Biografía de Juan de Torquemada". Fray Juan de Torquemada, Monarquía indiana (in Spanish). Vol. 7. Mexico City: Instituto de Investigaciones Históricas (IIH), Universidad Nacional Autonoma de México (UNAM).

–"Fuentes de la Monarquía indiana". Fray Juan de Torquemada, Monarquía indiana. Vol. 7. Mexico City: Instituto de Investigaciones Históricas (IIH), Universidad Nacional Autónoma de México (UNAM). 1983. pp. 93–108.

- Mathes, Michael W. (1970). "To Save a City: The Desague of Mexico-Huehuetoca, 1607". The Americas. 26 (4 (Apr., 1970)): 419–438. doi:10.2307/980184. JSTOR 980184. S2CID 147354029.
- Merrim, Stephanie (2009). "Sor Juana Criolla and the Mexican Archive"". In Bauer, Ralph; et al. (eds.). Creole Subjects in the Colonial Americas: Empires, Texts, Identities. University of North Carolina Press. pp. 193–218.
- Moreno Toscano, Alejandra (1961). "Vindicación de Torquemada". Historia Mexicana (in Spanish).
- Preibish, André (1971). "Juan De Torquemada and Antonio Alcedo: Two Contributions to Hispanic Historiography". The Courier. VIII (3). Syracuse University Library Associates: 20–27.
- Rubial García, Antonio (2002). "La crónica religiosa: Historia sagrada y conciencia colectiva". In Chang-Rodríguez, Raquel (coordinadora) (ed.). Historia de la literatura mexicana, Vol. 2: La cultura letrada en la Nueva España del siglo XVII. México: Siglo veintiuno editores. pp. 325–371.
- Victoria, José Guadalupe (1990). "Noticias sobre la destrucción del retablo del Tlatelolco". Anales del Instituto de Investigaciones Estéticas. 16 (61): 73. doi:10.22201/iie.18703062e.1990.61.1565. Vol. XVI, núm. 61, pp. 73–80
- Victoria, José Guadalupe (1994). Un pintor en su tiempo: Baltasar de Echave Orio. Instituto de Investigaciones Estéticas, a research institute of UNAM.
- Villalba, Félix Jiménez (1996). "La Monarquía indiana de fray Juan de Torquemada y la historia pre-Azteca del valle de México". Anales del Museo de América. 4: 39–45.
