= Francisco Zamora de Orello =

Most Reverend Francisco Zamora de Orello
- Titular Bishop of Brefny
- Church: Catholic Church
- In office: 1523-?

Francisco Zamora de Orello, O.F.M. Conv. was a Roman Catholic prelate who served as Titular Bishop of Brefny (1523–?).

== Biography ==
Francisco Zamora de Orello was ordained a priest in the Order of Friars Minor Conventual. On 26 Nov 1523, he was appointed during the papacy of Pope Clement VII as Titular Bishop of Brefny. While bishop, he was the principal co-consecrator of Juan de Zumárraga, Bishop of México (1533).
