= Miguel Betanzos =

Argentine novelist

Alejandro Miguel Betanzos (born 1962) is an Argentine novelist born in Buenos Aires.

== List of works ==
- La máquina solar. Galileo, la verdad frente al dogma, Edhasa, 1996, ISBN 978-84-350-0654-5
- Las tierras exuberantes. En busca del paraiso terrenal, Editorial Sudamericana, 1998, ISBN 9789500713771
- Matar al Virrey. Historia de una conspiración, Editorial Sudamericana, 1999, ISBN 978-950-07-1634-5
- Americo Vespucio. Hacia un mar de siete colores, Editorial Sudamericana, 2000, ISBN 978-950-07-1876-9
- Las cárceles de Dios. Una novela sobre la inquisición, Editorial Sudamericana, 2002, ISBN 978-950-07-2274-2
- Inquisición: las cárceles del Santo Oficio, Edhasa, 2004, ISBN 978-84-350-6073-8
- Sócrates: el sabio envenenado, Grijalbo, 2005, ISBN 978-950-28-0380-7
- Los conjurados de Roma, Grijalbo, 2007, ISBN 978-950-28-0423-1
