= Agustín de Vetancurt =

Mexican historian

Agustín de Vetancurt (also written Vetancourt, Betancourt, Betancur; 1620–1700) was a Mexican Catholic historian and scholar of the Nahuatl language. Born in Mexico City, Vetancurt became a Franciscan in Puebla, where he spent 40 years amongst the indigenous. He was official chronicler of the Order, so much of his most important work Teatro Mexicano deals with matters of interest to its members. But it is not only a history of the Franciscans in Mexico, but also a wide-ranging discussion of indigenous history and customs, topics of great interest to Franciscans of the first generation in Mexico. He drew upon the works of fellow Franciscans Gerónimo de Mendieta and Juan de Torquemada. Although he recapitulates some material from his sources, there is considerable material on prehispanic and colonial indigenous not found elsewhere and particularly valuable for the seventeenth century. He was helped in his work by Don Carlos de Siguenza y Gongora, and it is possible that some information on prehispanic indigenous culture came from him. Vetancurt accused his Franciscan predecessor Fray Juan de Torquemada, author of Monarquia Indiana, of plagiarizing the work of Gerónimo de Mendieta.

== Works ==
- 1673: Arte de lengua mexicana. [6], 49 [i.e. 50], [8] leaves. En Mexico: Por Francisco Rodríguez Lupercio. Referenced by: JCB Lib. cat., pre-1675, III : 267; Sabin, 99385; Palau y Dulcet (2nd ed.), 36120; Medina, J. T. México, 1103; Viñaza, C. Lenguas indígenas, 204
- 1697: Teatro Mexicano: Crónica de la Provincia del Santo Evangelio de México, Menologio Franciscano. 5 pt. Mexico: por Dona María de Benavides Viuda de Ivan de Ribera, 1697–98
  - Teatro Mexicano: descripción breve de los sucesos ejemplares de la Nueva-España en el Nuevo Mundo Occidental de las Indias. 4 vols. Madrid: J. Porrúa Turanzas, 1960 (Contents: 1. Sucessos naturales. Sucessos políticos.--2. De los sucessos militares de las armas. Tratado de la ciudad de México. Tratado de la ciudad de Puebla.--3. Chronica de la Provincia del Santo Evangelico.--4. Menologio franciscano de los varones más señalados, que con sus vidas exemplares ilustraron la Provencia de el Santo Evangelio de México.)
  - Teatro Mexicano: descripción breve de los sucesos ejemplares, históricos y religiosos del Nuevo Mundo de las Indias. Crónica de la Provincia del Santo Evangelio de México. Menologio franciscano de los varones más señalados, que con sus vidas ejemplares, perfección religiosa, ciencia, predicación evangélica en su vida, ilustraron la Provincia del Santo Evangelio de México. México: Editorial Porrúa, 1971.
