= Pedro de Betanzos =

Spanish Franciscan missionary and linguist

Pedro de Betanzos (died 1570) was a Spanish Franciscan missionary and linguist.

== Life ==
Betanzos was born in Betanzos in Galicia. He was one of the earliest Franciscan missionaries to Guatemala, and founder of the Church in Nicaragua. He is said to have acquired, in eight years, the use of fourteen Indian languages, including Nahuatl. He became fluent in Quiché, Kaqchikel, and Zutuhil in one year.

During this time, and on account of his writings, the controversy began between the Franciscans and Dominicans over the use of the Indian term "Cabovil" as a synonym for God. Betanzos insisted they were not synonymous and always wrote "Dios", even in Indian idioms. The Dominicans on the other hand kept up the native term "Cabovil". The Franciscans were correct, in that the indigenous peoples had no conception of monotheism, and "Cabovil" does not mean a personal supreme Deity. Betanzos died at Chomez, Nicaragua.

== Works ==
Along with Juan de Torres, Betanzos was one of the authors of a work published at Mexico and entitled, Arte, Vocabulario y Doctrina Christiana en Lengua de Guatemala. It is probably the book printed in Mexico previous to 1553 as Catecismo y Doctrina Cristiana en idioma Utlateco and ascribed to the "Franciscan Fathers", and also to Bishop Marroquin of Guatemala. No copy of it, however, is known to exist. It is the earliest work printed in any of the languages of Guatemala.

== See also ==
- Spanish conquest of Guatemala
- Roman Catholicism in Guatemala
