= Roman Catholic Diocese of Drivasto =

The Diocese of Drivasto or Diocese of Drivast (Latin: Dioecesis Drivastensis) was a Roman Catholic bishopric with see in the town of Drivasto (modern day Drisht in Postribë, 16 km north of Scutari, northern Albania) from circa 400 to 1650 and is now a Latin Catholic titular see. It was suppressed in 1650 (merged into the Diocese of Shkodrë) but restored as Latin titular see.

== History ==
- Established probably in the fifth century (certainly no later than the ninth) as the Diocese of Drivasto (Curiate Italian) / Drisht (Shqipetar) / Drivasten(sis) (Latin), without direct precursor It was a suffragan of the Archdiocese of Doclea (Albania; later united with Antivari) in the papal sway, and part of the twelfth century a suffragan of the Archdiocese of Ragusa.
- Suppressed in 1650, merged into the Diocese of Shkodrë
- 1933: Restored as Episcopal Titular see of Drivasto, see below

=== List of Episcopal Ordinaries (incomplete) ===
- ? Paulus (458) episcopus Prinatenus, signing the letter of the bishops from Epirus Novus province to Byzantine emperor Leo I the Thracian in 458 after the lynching by Coptic mobs of Patriarch Proterius of Alexandria
- ...
- Unknown (877) - in 877 the anonymous incumbent attends a council at Dumno (concilium Delmitanum).
- ...
- Unknown (1062) - The see is mentioned (not its incumbent) in various papal documents starting with a letter from Pope Alexander II (1061–1073) to Metropolitan Petrus (Pietro) of the united archbishoprics of Doclea and Antivari, and lists Drivastum, in 1062, amongst its suffragans. The letter is dated 18 March 1067. This is confirmed on 8 January 1089 by Pope Clement III.
- ? Elia (1122): Pope Callixtus II (1119–1124) mentions the diocese in 1122 as suffragan of the Archdiocese of Ragusa (in Dalmatia, Croatia)
- Petrus I (1141–1153) (recorded from 1141 – 1153, when he was deposed)
- Martinus (1166–1178)
- Petrus II (1199-?)
- Unknown (1120)
- Unknown (1150)
- ...
- Dominicus (? – death 1322)
- Nicolaus, Order of Saint Augustine (O.S.A.) (28 Feb 1323 – 17 Dec 1324), next Bishop Argos (insular Greece) (1324.12.17 – death 1334)
- ...
- B... (1351.12.26 – ?) Only the "B" initial is known about this bishop.
- Giovanni Andrea (1359 – 1373.05.18), next Metropolitan Archbishop of Bar (1373.05.18 – 1382)
- Bernardus (1373 – 1374.04.29), next Bishop of Kotor (1374.04.29 – ?)
- Athanasius (1374.04.29 – ?) He had served the church of Saint Andrea in Padova.
- Nicolaus II Bazie, Order of Friars Minor (O.F.M.) (1391.02.15 – 1394.02.16), next Bishop of Caorle (1394.02.16 – ?)
- Andreas de Montanea, O.F.M. (1398.08.16 – ?)
- Bartholomaus Puonbiolus (1400? – 1404 deposed)
- Francesco da Scutari, O.F.M. (1405.12.01 – 1424.05.24), next Bishop of Ulcinj = Dulcigno (1424.05.24 – ?)
- Nicolaus III Wallibassa (1424.05.24 – 1425 not possessed)
- Dionisius of Knin, Order of Preachers (O.P.) (29 Nov 1425 – 1428.10.11 deposed)
- Michael Paoli (1428.10.11 – death 1445?), previously Bishop of Balecio (1424.09.01 – 1428.10.11)
- Paulus Dussus (1445.12.22 – from 1454 in commendam – death? 1455), gifted politician, sympathized with the oriental rites, mediator between Giorgio Castriota Scanderbeg and his adversaries, instructed by the Holy See concerning a crusade against the Ottoman Turks; previously Bishop of Svač (1440.11.16 – 1445.12.22), from 1454 Bishop of Krain (Carniola, Slovenia)
- Nicolaus IV (1457)
- Thomas Terslav (? – death 1489), last actual residential bishop, slain as the Ottoman conquerors sacked and destroyed the city.
- Franciscus II (1489–1496),
- Girolamo Lucich, Order of Friars Minor (O.F.M.) (3 March 1636 – death 2 January 1648), was appointed as (last) residential bishop, but never took up residence and consented on 20 April 1641 to hand the diocesan administration to the Diocese of Scutari.

== Titular see ==
During the Ottoman rule from 1489, the see was truly in paribus infidelium, and Rome appointed titular bishops who usually served as auxiliary bishop in some residential diocese;

- Francesco de Ecclesia (1489.12.02 – ?)
- Benedetto Kornis, Norbertines (O. Praem.) (1512.10.29 – ?)
- Francisco Mora (bishop), O.F.M. (10 Nov 1518 – death 1520)
- Giovanni de Zaguis, Benedictine Order (O.S.B.) (1520.01.13 – 1520?)
- Gonzalo de Ubeda, Mercedarians (O. de M.) (6 Feb 1521 – 1525?)
- Bishop-elect Pedro Fernández de Jaén, O.P. (Spanish) (1525.03.20 – ?), also Auxiliary Bishop of Jaén (Andalusia, southern Spain) (1525.03.20 – ?)
- Francisco Solís (? – death 1540?)
- Alfonso de Sanabria (4 May 1541 – ?)

...

The diocese was nominally restored in 1933 as Latin Titular bishopric of Drivastum (Latin) / Drivasto (Curiate Italian) / Drivasten(sis) (Latin adjective).

It has had the following incumbents, of the fitting Episcopal (lowest) rank, with a few archiepiscopal exceptions :

- Cipriano Cassini (趙信義), Jesuits (S.J.) (1936.12.23 – 1946.04.11) as last Apostolic Vicar of Bengbu 蚌埠 (PR China) (1937.01.15 – 1946.04.11), next promoted first Bishop of Bengbu 蚌埠 (1946.04.11 – 1951.06.11)
- Daniel Liston, Holy Ghost Fathers (C.S.Sp.) (born Ireland) (1947.03.13 – 1949.12.19) as Coadjutor Bishop of Port-Louis (Mauritius) (1947.03.13 – 1949.12.19), next succeeding as Bishop of Port-Louis (1949.12.19 – retired 1968.04.23), emeritate as Titular Bishop of Summa (1968.04.23 – resigned 1970.12.07), died 1986
- João Floriano Loewenau, O.F.M. (born Poland) (1950.09.08 – 1979.06.04) as Bishop-Prelate of Territorial Prelature of Santarém (Brazil, now a diocese) (1950.09.08 – 1957.09.12), later Bishop-Prelate of daughter see Territorial Prelature of Óbidos (Brazil) (1957.09.12 – 1972)
- Rafael Barraza Sánchez (1979.10.26 – 1981.10.19) as Auxiliary Bishop of Durango (Mexico) (1979.10.26 – 1981.10.19), later Bishop of Mazatlán (Mexico) (1981.10.19 – retired 2005.03.03)
- Titular Archbishop: Traian Crisan (born Romania) (1981.12.07 – death 1990.11.06), Secretary of Congregation for the Causes of Saints (1981.12.07 – 1990.02.24); previously Undersecretary of Sacred Congregation for the Causes of Saints (1979 – 1981.12.07)
- Bruno Bertagna (Italian) (1990.12.15 – 2007.02.15 see below), as Secretary of Pontifical Commission for the Vatican City State (1990.12.15 – 1994), Secretary of Pontifical Council for Legislative Texts (1994 – 2007.02.15), Auditor General of Apostolic Camera (2006.12.18 – 2010.10.12); previously Cleric Prelate of Apostolic Camera (1989.02.28 – 1990.12.15)
- Titular Archbishop: Bruno Bertagna (see above 2007.02.15 – death 2013.10.31) as Auditor General of Apostolic Camera (2006.12.18 – 2010.10.12), Vice-President of Pontifical Council for Legislative Texts (2007.02.15 – 2010.10.12) and as emeritate
- Paul Tighe (Irish) (2015.12.19 – ...), Roman Curia official : Adjunct Secretary of Pontifical Council for Culture (2015.12.19 – ...), Member of Vatican Media Committee as Secretary of Pontifical Council for Social Communications (2007.11.30 – 2015.12.19); previously Member of Committee for the reform for the Vatican Media (2014.07.09 – 2015).

== See also ==
- List of Catholic dioceses in Albania
- Catholic Church in Albania

== Sources and external links ==
- GCatholic - former and titular see - data for all sections
- Catholic-Hierarchy.org. - Diocese of Drivasto (Drivost) David M. Cheney. Retrieved July 17, 2016

Bibliography

- Michel Lequien, Oriens christianus in quatuor Patriarchatus digestus, Paris 1740, vol. II, coll. 252–253
- John Van Antwerp Fine, The Early Medieval Balkans: A Critical Survey from the Sixth to the Late Twelfth Century, Ann Arbor 2000, p. 223
- John Van Antwerp Fine, The Late Medieval Balkans: A Critical Survey from the Late Twelfth Century to the Ottoman Conquest, Ann Arbor 1994, pp. 45–46
- J. Valentini, 'Drivasto', in Dictionnaire d'Histoire et de Géographie ecclésiastiques, vol. XIV, Paris, 1960, coll. 796–798
- Daniele Farlati-Jacopo Coleti, Illyricum Sacrum, vol. VII, Venice 1817, pp. 232–248
- Acta et diplomata res Albaniae mediae aetatis illustrantia, ed. Ludovicus de Thallóczy, Constantinus Jireček e Emilianus de Sufflay, Vol. I, Vienna 1913 - Vol. II, Vienna, 1918
- Pius Bonifacius Gams, Series episcoporum Ecclesiae Catholicae, Leipzig, 1931, pp. 406, 408
- Konrad Eubel, Hierarchia Catholica Medii Aevi, vol. 1, p. 227; vol. 2, p. 145; vol. 3, pp. 187–188; vol. 4, p. 177
- Malaj, Edmond (2021), Hulumtime mbi historinë e krishtërimit në Shkodër e rrethina gjatë mesjetës, Botime Françeskane, ISBN 978-9928-331-17-5
