= Tlatelolco, Mexico City =

Area in Cuauhtémoc, Mexico City

Coordinates: 19°27′11″N 99°08′25″W

Tlatelolco (Classical Nahuatl: Tlatelōlco [tɬateˈloːɬko], or Tlatilōlco, modern Nahuatl pronunciation from tlalli - land; telolli - hill; co - place; lit. 'In the little hill of land') is an area now within the Cuauhtémoc borough of Mexico City, centered on the Plaza de las Tres Culturas (Square of Three Cultures). Its archeological history extends to remains from the 15th and 16th centuries, as well as more recent colonial structures.

The square is bounded by an excavated Aztec archaeological site, the 16th century college church designed by Fray Juan de Torquemada and dedicated to St James the Great (known as Colegio de Santa Cruz de Tlatelolco), the remains of a former Franciscan convent to which was formerly attached the Colegio de Santa Cruz de Tlatelolco, and an office complex that was used by the Ministry of Foreign Relations and is now the property of the National Autonomous University of Mexico.

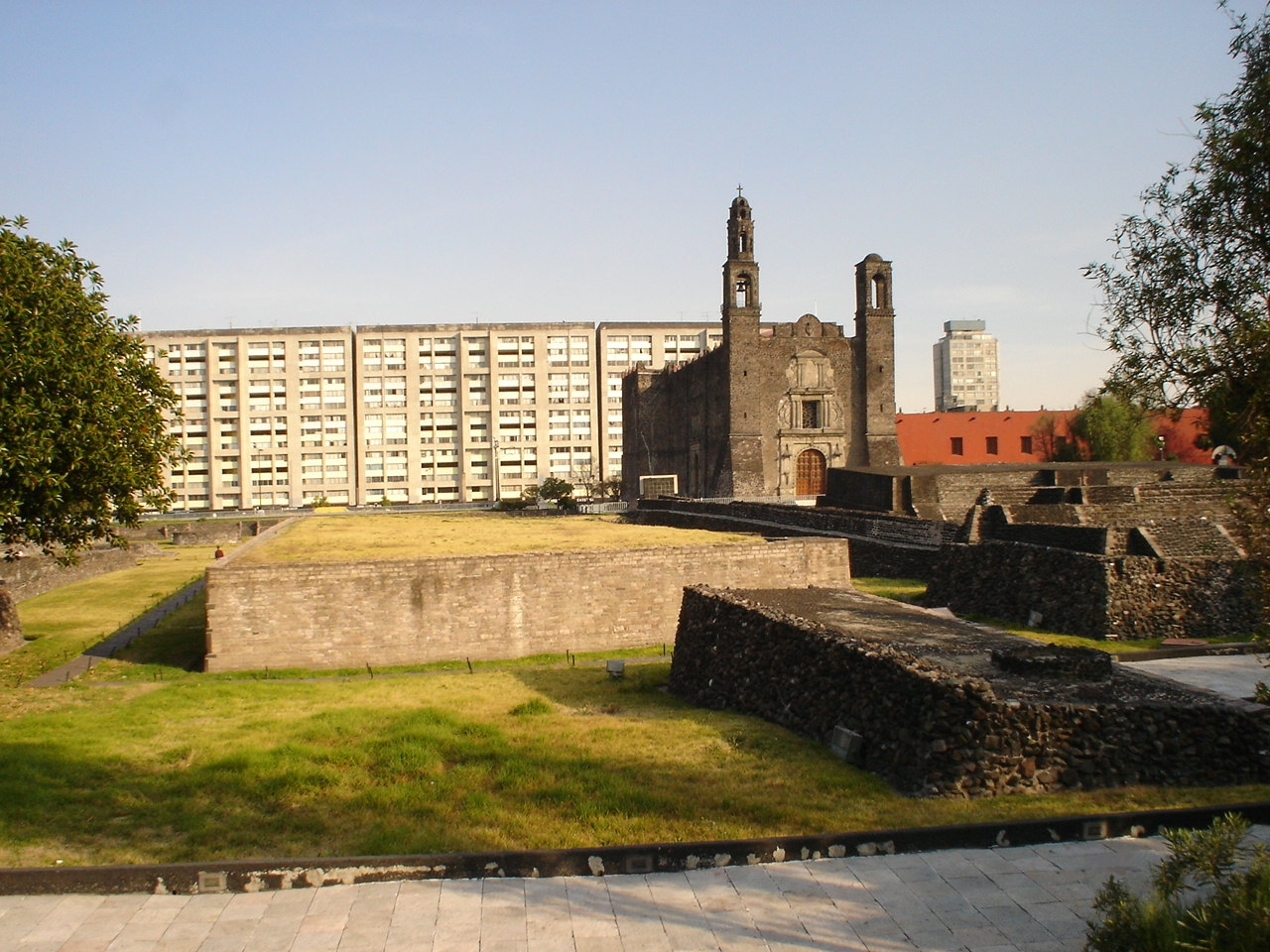
Plaza de las Tres Culturas

== History of modern Tlatelolco ==
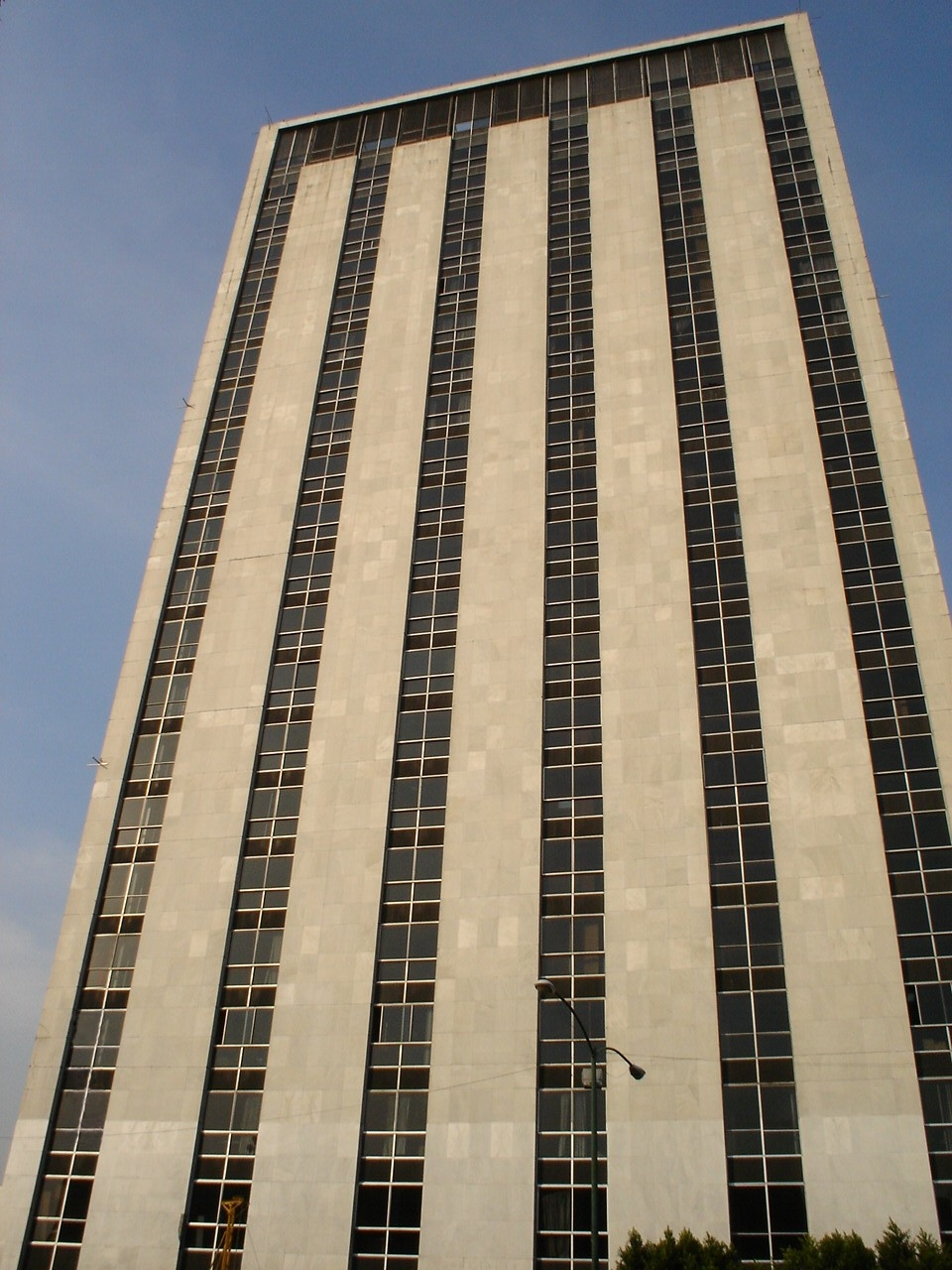
Former foreign ministry building

The Nonoalco-Tlatelolco housing project, built in the 1960s, is served by Metro Tlatelolco. The complex includes the pyramid-shaped Banobras building, which houses a 47-bell carillon. At 125 meters, this is the world's tallest carillon tower. A building with a facade of white marble was constructed by the government for and used by the Secretariat of Foreign Affairs (SRE). It is now used by the National Autonomous University of Mexico.

In 1967, the Treaty of Tlatelolco was signed here with the aim of establishing a nuclear-weapon-free zone throughout Latin America and the Caribbean. Since then, all the region's countries have signed and ratified the treaty.

The late 1960s were a time of political unrest in Mexico and many western nations. On October 2, 1968, ten days before the start of the 1968 Summer Olympics, the plaza was the scene of the Tlatelolco massacre. The exact number of dead and injured on that tragic afternoon is still unknown. It is estimated 15,000 rounds were fired by the Mexican army and police in an attempt to suppress the protests, resulting in more than 300 dead and 700 injured. In addition, 5,000 students were arrested.

On September 19, 1985, many homes and business structures were destroyed or suffered damage due to the 1985 Mexico City earthquake. The "Nuevo León" building collapsed. Due to many Mexicans working together to rescue people from the ruins, a small square marks the spot and is a symbol of their solidarity during the disaster. The opera singer Plácido Domingo, who was among many with family there, worked to help rescue survivors.
