= 6th federal electoral district of Guerrero =

Federal electoral district of Mexico

Guerrero's 6th
- Electoral district of the Chamber of Deputies of Mexico

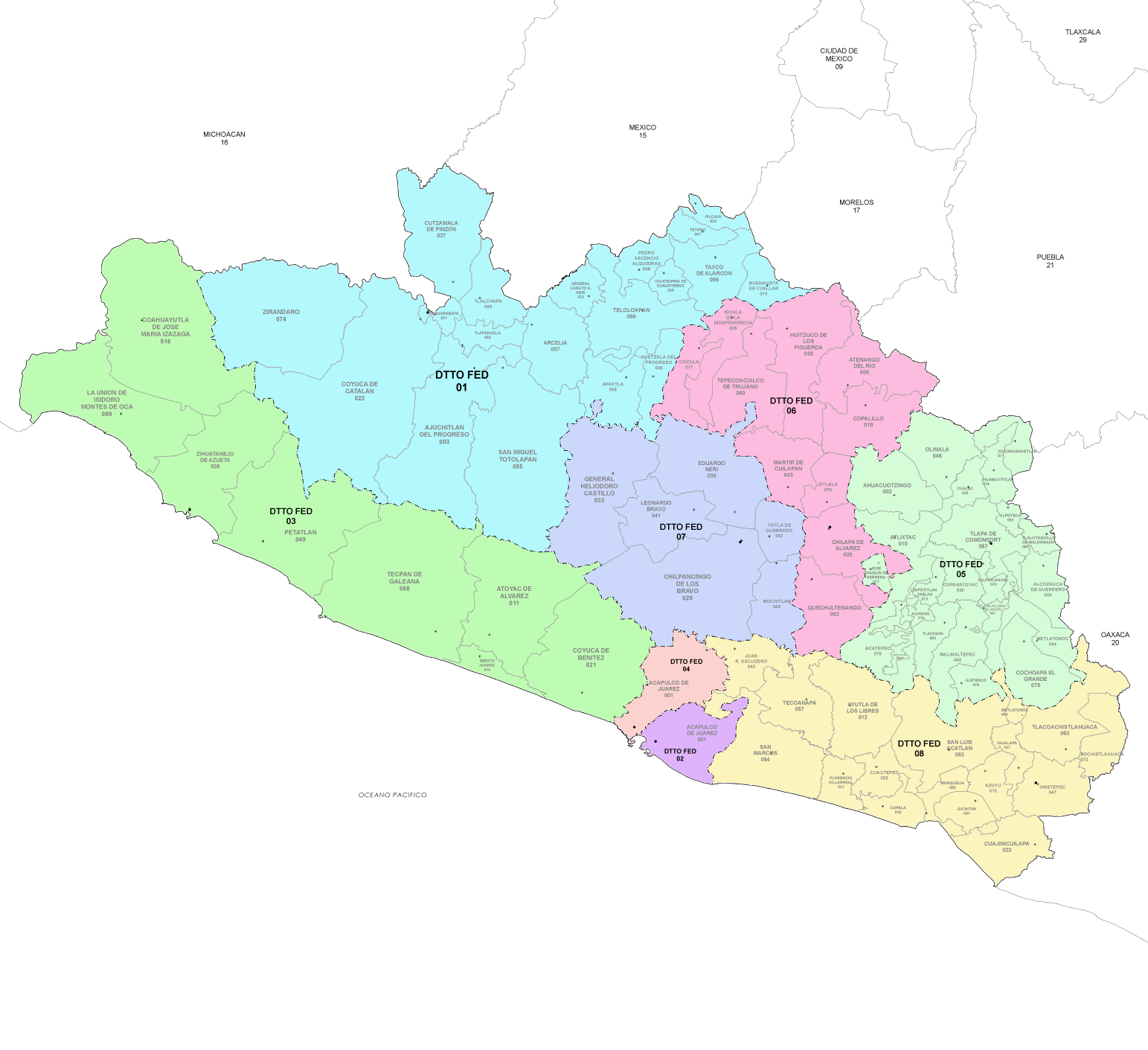
- 6th district since 2022

Incumbent
- Member: María del Carmen Nava García
- Party: ▌Ecologist Green Party
- Congress: 66th (2024–2027)

District
- State: Guerrero
- Head town: Chilapa de Álvarez
- Coordinates: 17°36′N 99°11′W
- Covers: 10 municipalities: Atenango del Río, Chilapa de Álvarez, Cocula, Copalillo, Huitzuco de los Figueroa, Iguala de la Independencia, Mártir de Cuilapán, Quechultenango, Tepecoacuilco de Trujano, Zitlala
- PR region: Fourth
- Precincts: 355
- Population: 462,003 (2020 census)
- Indigenous: Yes (45%)

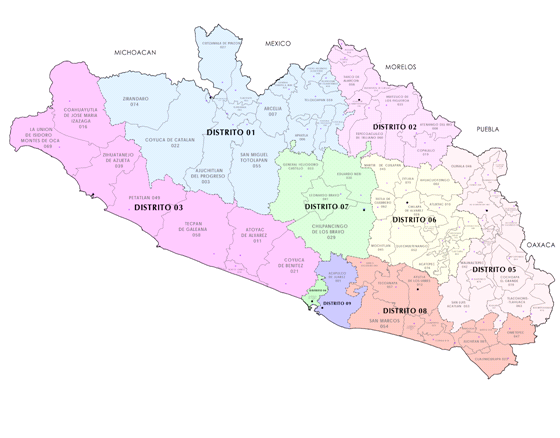
Guerrero under the 2017–2022 districting plan

The 6th federal electoral district of Guerrero (Spanish: Distrito electoral federal 06 de Guerrero) is one of the 300 electoral districts into which Mexico is divided for elections to the federal Chamber of Deputies and one of eight such districts in the state of Guerrero.

It elects one deputy to the lower house of Congress for each three-year legislative period by means of the first-past-the-post system. Votes cast in the district also count towards the calculation of proportional representation ("plurinominal") deputies elected from the fourth region.

The current member for the district, elected in the 2024 general election, is María del Carmen Nava García of the Ecologist Green Party of Mexico (PVEM)

== District territory ==
Guerrero lost a congressional seat in the 2023 redistricting process carried out by the National Electoral Institute (INE). Under the new districting plan, which is to be used for the 2024, 2027 and 2030 federal elections, the reconfigured 6th district covers 355 electoral precincts (secciones electorales) across ten municipalities in the north-east of the state:

- Atenango del Río, Chilapa de Álvarez, Cocula, Copalillo, Huitzuco de los Figueroa, Iguala de la Independencia, Mártir de Cuilapán, Quechultenango, Tepecoacuilco de Trujano and Zitlala.

The head town (cabecera distrital), where results from individual polling stations are gathered together and tallied, is the city of Chilapa de Álvarez. The district reported a population of 462,003 in the 2020 census; with Indigenous and Afro-Mexican inhabitants accounting for over 45% of that total, it is classified by the INE as an indigenous district. (Note: The INE deems any local or federal electoral district where Indigenous or Afrodescendent inhabitants number 40% or more of the population to be an indigenous district.)

== Previous districting schemes ==
Evolution of electoral district numbers
	1974	1978	1996	2005	2017	2023
Guerrero	6	10	10	9	9	8
Chamber of Deputies	196	300				

Because of shifting population patterns, Guerrero currently has two fewer districts than the ten the state was assigned under the 1977 electoral reforms that set the national total at 300.

2017–2022

Between 2017 and 2022, Guerrero was allocated nine electoral districts. The 6th district had its head town at Chilapa de Álvarez and it comprised 13 municipalities:
- Acatepec, Ahuacuotzingo, Atlixtac, Chilapa de Álvarez, Copanatoyac, Mártir de Cuilapán, Mochitlán, Quechultenango, Tixtla de Guerrero, Tlacoapa, Zapotitlán Tablas and Zitlala.

2005–2017

The 2005 districting plan assigned Guerrero nine districts. The 6th district's head town was at Chilapa de Álvarez and it covered 14 municipalities:
- Ahuacuotzingo, Atenango del Río, Buenavista de Cuéllar, Copalillo, Cualac, Chilapa de Álvarez, Eduardo Neri, Huamuxtitlán, Huitzuco de los Figueroa, Mártir de Cuilapán, Olinalá, Tepecoacuilco de Trujano, Xochihuehuetlán and Zitlala.

1996–2005

Under the 1996 districting plan, which allocated Guerrero ten districts, the 6th district had its head town at Chilapa de Álvarez and it covered 10 municipalities in the same broad area as the later plans.
- Acatepec, Ahuacuotzingo, Atlixtac, Chilapa de Álvarez, Mártir de Cuilapán, Mochitlán, Quechultenango, Tixtla de Guerrero, Zapotitlán Tablas and Zitlala.

1978–1996

The districting scheme in force from 1978 to 1996 was the result of the 1977 electoral reforms, which increased the number of single-member seats in the Chamber of Deputies from 196 to 300. Under that plan, Guerrero's district allocation rose from six to ten. The 6th district had its head town at Ometepec and it covered eight municipalities in the south-east of the state. (Note: Chilapa de Álvarez was the head town of the 10th district.)

== Deputies returned to Congress ==
(Mexico) National parties
- Current
- PAN
- PRI
- PT
- PVEM
- MC
- Morena
- PAZ
- Somos
- Defunct or local only
- PLM
- PNR
- PRM
- PNM
- PP
- PPS
- PARM
- PFCRN
- CON
- PANAL
- PSD
- PES
- PES
- PRD

Guerrero's 6th district
Election	Deputy	Party	Term	Legislature
The sixth district was suspended between 1943 and 1961
1961	Luis Vázquez Campos	Institutional Revolutionary Party	1961–1964	45th Congress
1964	Juan Francisco Andraca Malda	Institutional Revolutionary Party	1964–1967	46th Congress
1967	Guillermo González Martínez	Institutional Revolutionary Party	1967–1970	47th Congress
1970	José María Serna Maciel	Institutional Revolutionary Party	1970–1973	48th Congress
1973	Nabor Ojeda Delgado	Institutional Revolutionary Party	1973–1976	49th Congress
1976	Salustio Salgado Guzmán	Institutional Revolutionary Party	1970–1973	48th Congress
1979	Israel Martínez Galeana	Institutional Revolutionary Party	1979–1982	51st Congress
1982	Adrián Mayoral Bracamontes	Institutional Revolutionary Party	1982–1985	52nd Congress
1985	Agustín Villavicencio Altamirano	Institutional Revolutionary Party	1985–1988	53rd Congress
1988	Juan Albarrán Castañeda	Institutional Revolutionary Party	1988–1991	54th Congress
1991	Ángel Aguirre Rivero	Institutional Revolutionary Party	1991–1994	55th Congress
1994	Marcelino Miranda Añorve	Institutional Revolutionary Party	1994–1997	56th Congress
1997	Verónica Muñoz Parra	Institutional Revolutionary Party	1997–2000	57th Congress
2000	Raúl Homero González Villalva	Institutional Revolutionary Party	2000–2003	58th Congress
2003	Marcelo Tecolapa Tixteco	Institutional Revolutionary Party	2003–2006	59th Congress
2006	Marco Matías Alonso	Party of the Democratic Revolution	2006–2009	60th Congress
2009	Alicia Elizabeth Zamora Villalva	Institutional Revolutionary Party	2009–2012	61st Congress
2012	Carlos de Jesús Alejandro	Party of the Democratic Revolution	2012–2015	62nd Congress
2015	Verónica Muñoz Parra	Institutional Revolutionary Party	2015–2018	63rd Congress
2018	Raymundo García Gutiérrez	Party of the Democratic Revolution	2018–2021	64th Congress
2021	Fabiola Rafael Dircio	Party of the Democratic Revolution	2021–2024	65th Congress
2024	María del Carmen Nava García	Ecologist Green Party of Mexico	2024–2027	66th Congress

== Presidential elections ==
Guerrero's 6th district
Election	District won by	Party or coalition	%
2018	Andrés Manuel López Obrador	Juntos Haremos Historia	44.5409
2024	Claudia Sheinbaum Pardo	Sigamos Haciendo Historia	59.8728
