= 10th federal electoral district of Guerrero =

Defunct federal electoral district of Mexico

Coordinates: 16°52′N 99°54′W

The 10th federal electoral district of Guerrero (Spanish: Distrito electoral federal 10 de Guerrero) was a federal electoral district of the Mexican state of Guerrero from 1977 to 2006. An earlier 10th district was abolished in 1930. (Note: An amendment to Article 52 of the Constitution in 1928 changed the original provision of "one deputy per 60,000 inhabitants" to "one deputy per 100,000"; as a result, the size of the Chamber of Deputies fell from 281 in the 1928 election to 171 in 1934.)

During its existence, the 10th district returned one deputy to the Chamber of Deputies for each of the 51st to 59th sessions of Congress. Votes cast in the district also counted towards the calculation of proportional representation ("plurinominal") deputies elected from the country's electoral regions.

Created as part of the 1977 political reforms, it was first contested in the 1979 mid-term election and elected its last deputy in the 2003 mid-terms. It was dissolved by the Federal Electoral Institute (IFE) in its 2005 redistricting process because the state's population no longer warranted ten districts.

== Territory ==
Evolution of electoral district numbers
	1974	1978	1996	2005	2017	2023
Guerrero	6	10	10	9	9	8
Chamber of Deputies	196	300				

1996–2005

In its final form, the 10th district covered the urban core of the municipality of Acapulco. The head town (cabecera distrital), where results from individual polling stations were gathered together and tallied, was the port city of Acapulco. The remainder of the municipality was assigned to the 9th district.

1978–1996

The districting scheme in force from 1978 to 1996 was the result of the 1977 electoral reforms, which increased the number of single-member seats in the Chamber of Deputies from 196 to 300. Under that plan, Guerrero's district allocation rose from six to ten. The newly created 10th district had its head town at Chilapa de Álvarez in the state's Mountain region and it comprised the municipalities of Ahuacuotzingo, Atenango del Río, Copalillo, Cualac, Chilapa, Huamuxtitlán, Huitzuco, Mártir de Cuilapán, Olinalá, Xochihuehuetlán and Zitlala.

== Deputies returned to Congress ==
(Mexico) National parties
- Current
- PAN
- PRI
- PT
- PVEM
- MC
- Morena
- Defunct or local only
- PLM
- PNR
- PRM
- PNM
- PP
- PPS
- PARM
- PFCRN
- Convergencia
- PANAL
- PSD
- PES
- PES
- PRD

Guerrero's 10th district
Election	Deputy	Party	Term	Legislature
The 10th district was suspended between 1930 and 1978
1979	Dámaso Lanche Guillén	Institutional Revolutionary Party	1979–1982	51st Congress
1982	Rubén Pérez Espino	Institutional Revolutionary Party	1982–1985	52nd Congress
1985	Jorge Montúfar Araujo	Institutional Revolutionary Party	1985–1988	53rd Congress
1988	Rubén Figueroa Alcocer	Institutional Revolutionary Party	1988–1991	54th Congress
1991	Jesús Ramírez Guerrero	Institutional Revolutionary Party	1991–1994	55th Congress
1994	Abel Velasco Velasco	Institutional Revolutionary Party	1994–1997	56th Congress
1997	Alberto López Rosas	Party of the Democratic Revolution	1997–2000	57th Congress
2000	David Augusto Sotelo Rosas	Party of the Democratic Revolution	2000–2003	58th Congress
2003	Irma Figueroa Romero	Party of the Democratic Revolution	2003–2006	59th Congress
