= List of politicians killed during the 2024 Mexican elections =

The following is a list of assassinations of political candidates that took place in Mexico during the 2024 Mexican general and local elections. Up to sixty politicians were assassinated during the pre-campaign and campaign periods in Mexico but, according to a statement by President Andrés Manuel López Obrador on 14 June 2024, the total number was six. None of the candidates killed were running for president.

== Prior to the electoral period ==
Assassinations that occurred before the start of the electoral period (20 November 2023).

Name	Political party	Date	Position	Notes
Javier Torres Barrera	PAN	13 July 2023	Aspiring candidate for mayor of Chiautla de Tapia, Puebla	Armed assailants kidnapped and killed Torres.
Wilman Monje Morales	MORENA	11 October 2023	Aspiring candidate for mayor of Gutiérrez Zamora, Veracruz	Former mayor of Gutiérrez Zamora (2018–2021) as a member of Citizens' Movement. Ambushed and shot after dropping off his son at Colegio México near the Gutiérrez Zamora Municipal Palace.
Alejandro Lanuza Hernández	PAN	11 October 2023	Aspiring candidate for mayor of Salvatierra, Guanajuato	Regidor of Salvatierra, Guanajuato. Had previously been kidnapped while his sister was mayor (2018–2021). Killed while walking near his residence at 9:00 am.
Miguel Ángel Cruz Robles	MORENA	26 October 2023	Aspiring candidate for mayor of Villa del Carbón, State of Mexico	While driving on the Jilotepec–Villa del Carbón highway, Cruz was fatally shot by armed assailants.

== Electoral period ==
Assassinations that occurred between the start of the campaigning period (20 November 2023) and election day (2 June 2024).

Name	Political party	Date	Position	Notes
Dagoberto García Rivera	MORENA	4 November 2023	Aspiring candidate for mayor of Maravatío, Michoacán	García Rivera was reported missing on 19 October; his body was found in Zinapécuaro, Michoacán, with signs of bullet wounds on 31 October and identified on 4 November.
Jaime Dámaso Solís	PAN	24 November 2023	Aspiring candidate for mayor of Zitala, Guerrero	Former regidor of Zitala, Guerrero. Fatally shot outside his residence in the municipality at 8:00am.
Ricardo Taja Ramírez	MORENA	21 December 2023	Aspiring candidate for federal deputy	Local deputy of Guerrero (2012–2015) and federal deputy (2015–2018) as a member of the Institutional Revolutionary Party. Fatally shot in Acapulco.
Giovanni Lezama Barrera	PAN	4 January 2024	Precandidate for local deputy of Morelos	Regidor of Cuautla, Morelos. Fatally shot in a gym in the municipality.
David Rey González Moreno	PRI	5 January 2024	Aspiring candidate for mayor of Suchiate, Chiapas	Armed assailants shot González Moreno while he was on a motorcycle near the Guatemala–Mexico border. Four gunshot wounds were found on his body.
Sergio Hueso	MC	5 January 2024	Aspiring candidate for mayor of Armería, Colima	While driving, his vehicle was intercepted by armed assailants and was shot multiple times.
Miriam Noemí Ríos	MC	11 January 2024	Municipal commissioner of Citizens' Movement in Jacona, Michoacán, and aspiring candidate for regidora	Trans woman and activist who was a candidate for regidora in 2021. She was shot by armed assailants while working at a clothing store.
Samantha Gomes Fonseca	MORENA	14 January 2024	Precandidate for senator representing Mexico City	Trans woman who was shot by armed assailants while riding a DiDi taxi.
Marcelino Ruiz Esteban	PRD	24 January 2024	Aspiring candidate for mayor of Atlixtac, Guerrero	While driving on the Chilapa–Tlapa federal highway, Ruiz Esteban and his wife, Guadalupe Guzmán Cano, were fatally shot by armed assailants.
Jaime Vera Alanís	PVEM	1 February 2024	Precandidate for mayor of Mascota, Jalisco	While exiting a laundromat in Zapopan, Vera Alanís was approached by two assailants dressed in black. One greeted him and then shot him three times.
Yair Martín Romero Segura	MORENA	10 February 2024	Precandidate for federal deputy	Romero Segura and his brother were fatally shot in Ecatepec.
Miguel Ángel Zavala Reyes	MORENA	26 February 2024	Precandidate for mayor of Maravatío, Michoacán	Two armed assailants shot Zavala Reyes at point blank-range while he was in his vehicle outside the clinic he worked at. The assailants fled in a car.
Armando Pérez Luna	PAN	26 February 2024	Precandidate for mayor of Maravatío, Michoacán	Pérez Luna was found dead in his car with gunshot wounds .
Alfredo González Díaz	PT	3 March 2024	Candidate for mayor of Atoyac de Álvarez, Guerrero	While driving, González Díaz was fatally shot by assailants.
Tomás Morales Patrón	MORENA	12 March 2024	Candidate for mayor of Chilapa de Álvarez, Guerrero	While getting out of his car outside his house, Morales Patrón was fatally shot by an armed assailant.
Diego Pérez Méndez	PRI	14 March 2024	Precandidate for mayor of San Juan Cancuc, Chiapas	Pérez Méndez's body was found in Chamula, Chiapas. His wife and son were found wounded in the same location.
Humberto Amezcua	PRI	15 March 2024	Mayor of Pihuamo, Jalisco, seeking reelection	While in his car, Amezcua was ambushed and shot by armed assailants.
Joaquín Martínez López	PVEM	19 March 2024	Mayor of Chahuites, Oaxaca, seeking reelection	Martínez López was shot by armed assailants in front of his house. This was the second consecutive time that the incumbent mayor of Chahuites was assassinated.
Jaime González Pérez	MORENA	23 March 2024	Precandidate for mayor of Acatzingo, Puebla	González Pérez was shot by two armed assailants while he was with his children on a car sales lot he owned. The assailants fled on motorcycles.
Gisela Gaytán	MORENA	1 April 2024	Candidate for mayor of Celaya, Guanajuato	At her first campaign rally in San Miguel Octopan, Gaytán was shot dead in broad daylight.
Julián Bautista Gómez	PRI	9 April 2024	Former mayor of Amatenango del Valle, Chiapas, seeking reelection	While driving his tractor on his way to work, armed assailants attacked and killed Bautista Gómez.
Noé Ramos Ferretiz	PAN	19 April 2024	Mayor of El Mante, Tamaulipas, seeking reelection	Ramos Ferretiz was fatally stabbed by several assailants during a campaign event in Col. Azucarera, Ciudad Mante.
Alberto Antonio García	MORENA	19 April 2024	Incumbent municipal treasurer of San José Independencia, Oaxaca, and mayoral candidate for the same municipality	Antonio García and his wife, the incumbent mayor of San José Independencia, were abducted on 17 April. The two were found stranded on an island in a local reservoir on 19 April; his wife survived the kidnapping, but Antonio García had been beaten to death.
Francisco Sánchez Gaeta	PVEM	27 April 2024	Candidate for síndico of Puerto Vallarta, Jalisco	Body found in an abandoned car on a highway in the municipality of Mascota, Jalisco.
Mauro Hernández Velin	Partido Chiapas Unido	3 May 2024	Candidate for regidor of Benemérito de las Américas, Chiapas	Killed in an attack on Juan Gómez Morales, the party's mayoral candidate in the same municipality. Gómez's son was also killed.
Santos Moreno Cabada	PRI	16 May 2024	Candidate for regidor in Choix, Sinaloa	Body with gunshot wounds abandoned on a vacant lot in Choix.
Aníbal Zúñiga Cortés	PRI	16 May 2024	Candidate for regidor of Coyuca de Benítez, Guerrero	One of four dismembered bodies found abandoned in a van in the port city of Acapulco. His wife was also one of the victims.
Lucero López Maza	Partido Popular Chiapaneco	16 May 2024	Mayoral candidate for the municipality of La Concordia, Chiapas	One of six people shot dead in a "clash between armed civilians" during a campaign event.
José Alfredo Cabrera Barrientos	PRI	29 May 2024	Candidate for mayor of Coyuca de Benítez, Guerrero	Killed before giving his last campaign speech.
Jorge Huerta	PVEM	31 May 2024	Candidate for regidor in Izúcar de Matamoros, Puebla	Shot while getting out of his vehicle in San Nicolás Tolentino.
Israel Delgado Vega	MORENA	1 June 2024	Candidate for síndico in Cuitzeo, Michoacán	Killed in a drive-by shooting at his home.

== See also ==
- List of politicians killed during the presidency of Andrés Manuel López Obrador
- List of politicians killed during the presidency of Claudia Sheinbaum
