= List of politicians killed during the presidency of Andrés Manuel López Obrador =

The following is a list of assassinations of politicians during the presidency of Andrés Manuel López Obrador, which started on 1 December 2018 and ended on 30 September 2024.

Assassinations of political candidates during the 2023-2024 election cycle can be found in List of politicians killed during the 2024 Mexican elections.

== 2018 ==
Name	Political affiliation	Date	Position	Notes
María Ascención Torres Cruz	MORENA	29 December 2018	Regidora-elect of Mazatepec, Morelos	Killed outside her home.

== 2019 ==
Name	Political affiliation	Date	Position	Notes
Alejandro Aparicio Santiago	MORENA	1 January 2019	Municipal president (Note: A municipal president is the chief executive of a municipality, comparable to the mayor of a town or city.) of Tlaxiaco, Oaxaca	Killed while on his way to his first meeting as municipal president.
Cutberto Porcayo Sánchez	MORENA	3 January 2019	Former president of MORENA in San José del Progreso, Oaxaca.	While driving, was attacked by armed assailants. After being shot, he lost control of the vehicle and crashed.
José Almanza Alcaine	MC	27 January 2019	Former regidor and former candidate for municipal president of Tlaquiltenango, Morelos	Intercepted by gunmen while driving.
Rodrigo Segura Guerrero	PES	19 March 2019	Regidor of Atizapán, State of Mexico.	Body found with four gunshot wounds at his private office.
Sergio Hernández Vega	N/A	17 April 2019	Former secretary of President Enrique Peña Nieto's bodyguard	Tortured and killed during a break-in at his residence.
David Eduardo Otlica Avilés	PRD	23 April 2019	Municipal president of Nahuatzen, Michoacán	Assailants broke into his house and kidnapped him; his body was found in Coeneo, Michoacán later that day.
Maricela Vallejo Orea	MORENA	24 April 2019	Municipal president of Altamirano, Veracruz	Vallejo and her husband, Zopiyactle, were intercepted by gunmen while riding in a vehicle. The other occupant, their chauffeur, was also killed. Prior to the assassination, Vallejo alleged that she had been offered money to not assume office.
Efrén Zopiyactle Tlaxcaltécatl	MORENA	24 April 2019	Municipal treasurer of Altamirano, Veracruz	Vallejo and her husband, Zopiyactle, were intercepted by gunmen while riding in a vehicle. The other occupant, their chauffeur, was also killed. Prior to the assassination, Vallejo alleged that she had been offered money to not assume office.
Eusebio Martinez	PES	14 July 2019	Regidor of La Paz, State of Mexico	His body was discovered in his car with a gunshot wound.
Fernando Tinoco Cervantes	N/A	21 July 2019	Representative of the Secretariat of the Interior (SEGOB)	Tinoco was reported missing on 19 July. His body was found tied up and blindfolded at the bottom of a well two days later.
Bertha Silva Díaz	MORENA	9 August 2019	Former candidate for local deputy of Guerrero.	Killed outside of a store 500 meters from a police station.
Carmela Parral Santos	PRD	16 August 2019	Municipal president of San José Estancia Grande, Oaxaca	Body was found with gunshot wounds. The body of a local official was found alongside Parral's.
Orencio Bello Sánchez	MORENA	21 August 2019	Former candidate for municipal president of Chilapa, Guerrero	Two bodies were found along the Chilpancingo–Chilapa federal highway, one being Bello Sánchez.
Francisco García Ramírez	MORENA	24 September 2019	Regidor of Apaseo el Alto, Guanajuato	While driving following a municipal council meeting, García was killed by gunmen. The other occupant was wounded.
José Luis Saucillo Méndez	PAN	25 September 2019	Regidor of Comonfort, Guanajuato	Body was found with over ten gunshot wounds.
Cornelio López Moreno	PAN	30 October 2019	Regidor of Santiago Maravatío, Guanajuato	Reported missing on 19 September 2019. His body was found on 30 October and identified on 1 November; the body had gunshot wounds.
Francisco Tenorio Contreras	PRD	2 November 2019	Municipal president of Valle de Chalco, State of Mexico	Shot by armed assailants in the head on 29 October 2019; he was declared brain dead at a hospital and died four days later.
Juan Gabriel Rodríguez Salinas	PRI	3 November 2019	Former municipal president of Santiago Llano Grande, Oaxaca	Shot by armed assailants at his home.
Juan Carlos Molina Palacios	PRI	9 November 2019	Local deputy of Veracruz	Shot outside of his ranch.
Hugo Estefanía Monroy	PRD	30 November 2019	Former municipal president of Cortazar, Guanajuato	Shot at his company's minibus base; his wife was seriously injured in the attack.
Lorenzo Barajas Heredia	PRD	13 December 2019	Former municipal president of Buenavista, Michoacán	Armed assailants broke into an event and shot Barajas.
Fidel Fernández Figueroa	MORENA	21 December 2019	Regidor and former municipal president of San Pedro Ixcatlán, Oaxaca	Shot at a grocery store.
Arturo García Velázquez	MORENA	23 December 2019	Municipal president of Jalapa de Díaz, Oaxaca	During a Christmas festival, armed assailants arrived at the municipal DIF offices and shot at both men.
Javier Terrero	MORENA	23 December 2019	Regidor of Jalapa de Díaz, Oaxaca	During a Christmas festival, armed assailants arrived at the municipal DIF offices and shot at both men.
Luciano Moreno López	PRI	31 December 2019	Former municipal president of Cochoapa el Grande, Guerrero	Shot at a dance by armed assailants; another man was also killed.

== 2020 ==
Name	Political affiliation	Date	Position	Notes
Erik Juárez Blanquet	PRD	10 March 2020	Former federal deputy for the 2nd district of Michoacán	Shot while in the passenger seat of a vehicle.
Obed Durón Gomez	N/A	6 April 2020	Municipal president of Mahahual, Quintana Roo	Intercepted and killed while on his way to Xkalak, Quintana Roo.
Luis Alfonso Robles Contreras	N/A	14 May 2020	Former municipal president of Magdalena de Kino, Sonora	Killed in a crossfire between two criminal groups.
Alfonso Isaac Gamboa Lozano	PRI	21 May 2020	Former Undersecretary of Finance and Public Credit (SHCP)	Armed assailants shot at a residence in Temixco, Morelos. Three men and two women were killed; Gamboa Lozano was among the victims.
Francis Anel Bueno Sánchez	MORENA	2 June 2020	Local deputy from Colima's 16th district.	Was kidnapped on 29 April 2020 while conducting a sanitization campaign related to the COVID-19 pandemic in Ixtlahuacán, Colima. Her body was discovered in a clandestine grave along the Tecomán-Alcuzahue highway on 2 June 2020.

== 2021 ==
Name	Political affiliation	Date	Position	Notes
Abel Murrieta Gutiérrez	PRI	13 May 2021	Former member of the Chamber of Deputies for Sonora's 6th district	Shot while handing out campaign flyers for the municipal presidency election.
Alma Rosa Barragán Santiago	Movimiento Ciudadano	21 May 2021	Mayoral candidate for the Mexican municipality of Moroleón	Shot while leading a campaign event in Guanajuato.

== 2024 ==
Name	Political affiliation	Date	Position	Notes
Aronia Wilson Tambo	N/A	9 January 2024	Councillor and indigenous leader	Killed at home.
Guadalupe Guzmán Cano	PRD	24 January 2024	PRD state advisor of Guerrero	While driving on the Chilapa–Tlapa federal highway, Guzmán Cano and her husband, Marcelino Ruiz Esteban, were fatally shot by armed assailants.
José Alejandro Naredo García	PRD	27 January 2024	PRD municipal leader of Cuitláhuac, Veracruz	Killed by armed assailants in Cuitláhuac, Veracruz.
Juan Pérez Guardado	N/A	7 February 2024	Secretary of Social Development in Fresnillo, Zacatecas	Brother-in-law of senator Ricardo Monreal. Fatally shot by armed assailants near the Real de Minas hospital in Fresnillo, Zacatecas.
Yolanda Sánchez	PAN	3 June 2024	Municipal president in Cotija de la Paz, Michoacán	Killed in a drive-by shooting in the public plaza.
Esmeralda Garzón Campos	MORENA	7 June 2024	Regidora in Tixtla, Guerrero	Shot dead outside her home.
Héctor Melesio Cuén Ojeda	PRI	25 July 2024	Former municipal president of Culiacán, former rector of the Autonomous University of Sinaloa, and deputy-elect	Circumstances unclear; probably connected to the arrest the same day of drug barons Joaquín Guzmán López and Ismael Zambada.
Ulises Hernández Martínez	N/A	29 September 2024	Putative future head of public security for the municipality of Chilpancingo de los Bravo, Guerrero	Former director of the Guerrero State Police's special forces

== See also ==
- List of politicians killed in the Mexican drug war
- List of politicians killed during the presidency of Claudia Sheinbaum
