= Atenango =

Atenango may refer to:

- Atenango del Río, Guerrero
- Atenango del Río (municipality), Guerrero
- San Agustín Atenango, Oaxaca
- Atenango Mixtec language
