= Cualac =

Cualac may refer to:

- Cualac (fish), a genus of fish in the family Cyprinodontidae
- Cualac, Guerrero, a city in Mexico
  - Cualac (municipality), its surrounding municipality
