= Food security in Mexico =

Flag of Mexico

Mexico has sought to ensure food security through its history. Yet, despite various efforts, Mexico continues to lack national food and nutrition strategies that secure food security for the people. As a large country of more than 100 million people, planning and executing social policies are complex tasks. Although Mexico has been expanding its food and nutrition programs that have been expected, and to some degree, have contributed to increases in health and nutrition, food security, particularly as it relates to obesity and malnutrition, still remains a relevant public health problem. Although food availability is not the issue, severe deficiencies in the accessibility of food contribute to insecurity.

Between 2003 and 2005, the total Mexican food supply was well above the level sufficient to meet the requirement of the Mexican population, averaging 3,270 kilocalories per daily capita, which is higher than the minimum requirements of 1,850 kilocalories per daily capita. However, at least 10 percent of the population in every Mexican state suffers from inadequate food access. In nine states, 25–35 percent live in food-insecure households. More than 10 percent of the population of seven Mexican states falls into the category of Serious Food Insecurity.

The issue of food inaccessibility is magnified by chronic child malnutrition, as well as obesity in children, adolescents, and families.

Mexico is vulnerable to drought, which can cripple agriculture.

== Introduction ==
The multifaceted nature of food security includes the combination of four elements:

- Food availability: Food availability refers to the adequate supply of quality food, provided through domestic production, imports, and aid.
- Food access: Food access refers to how easily the adequate supply of quality food can be accessed.
- Food stability: Food stability refers to both the availability and access dimensions of food security. A household or individual, to be food secure, must have access to adequate food at all times and should not risk access to food as a result of sudden crises or cyclical events like seasonal food insecurity.
- Food utilization: Food utilization refers to the way that the body physiologically uses the food. This is affected by both external circumstances, such as how the food is prepared and the variety of foods consumed, and internal circumstances, or how the body biologically utilizes the nutrients.

Food insecurity is a situation of limited or uncertain availability or ability to acquire safe and nutritious foods. It has been associated with negative impacts on human development such as increased poverty and inequality and with adverse health outcomes such as increased risk of being obese. Food insecurity has also been correlated with poor economic growth.

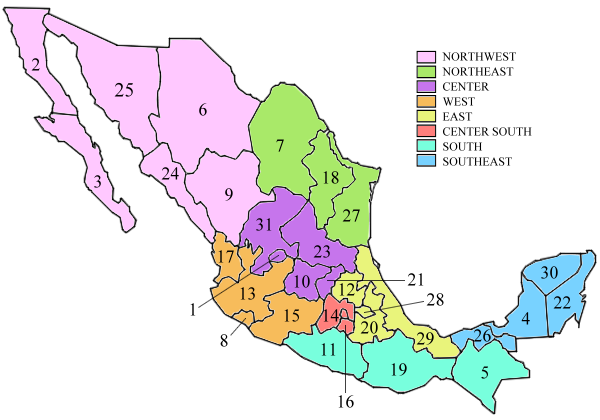
Map of the states of Mexico

In Mexico, differences in parts of the country are caused by factors such as socioeconomic status and urban/rural residence. The North region is the most industrialized, has a high per capital income and infrastructure, and has sufficient access to basic services. Although less developed than the North, the Central region still consists of large developed cities like Guadalajara. The South region is the least developed, has the most rural and indigenous inhabitants in Mexico, and has insufficient access to basic services. Therefore, health issues like infectious diseases and undernutrition are especially prevalent.

== History ==
Starting in the 1980s, various economic reforms changed productive sectors in Latin America. The Mexican agricultural sector, in particular, was affected when the state of Mexico began advocating for an export policy. The Mexican government undertook more radical attempts to restructure policy to further involve the agricultural sector into the global market such as joining the General Agreement on Tariffs and Trade (GATT) and the North American Free Trade Agreement (NAFTA).

Furthermore, due to the 2008 financial crisis, Mexico's economic activity declined. Mexico's gross domestic product (GDP) fell sharply, and its economy shrank by 6-7% in 2009. Its food poverty rate increased rapidly, from 13.8% in 2006 to 18.2% in 2010, reversing the declining trend of food poverty since 1996. With the increase in food prices and decline in income, food security increased, and the social impact of the 2008 financial crisis had a larger effect among the poorest and most vulnerable groups.

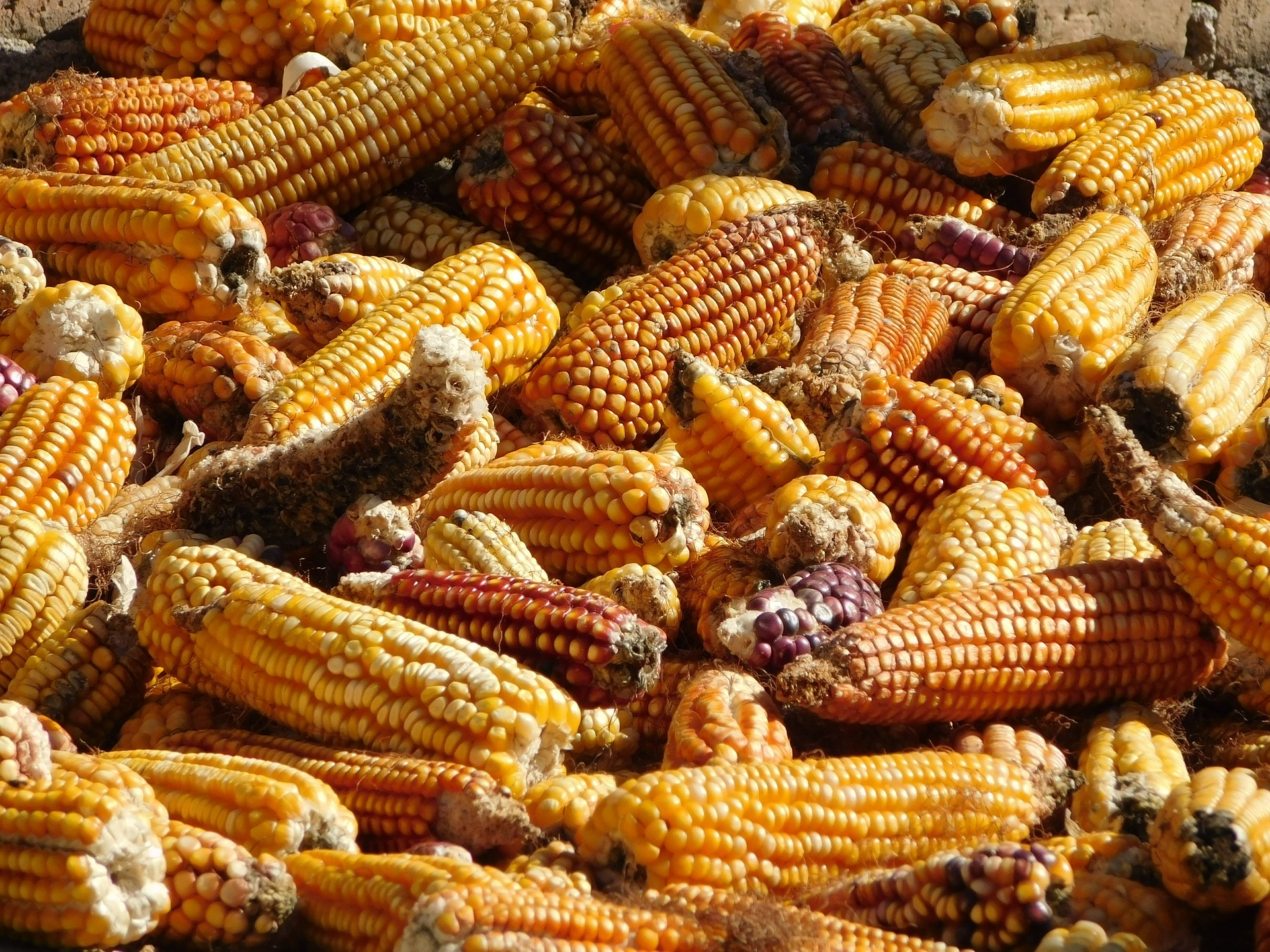
Corn in Mexico

As Mexico moves towards more open markets in agricultural trade, land, and water with NAFTA and the reprivatization of land, it faces an unknown economic future.

== Food availability ==
The supply of available food energy in Mexico goes beyond the requirements, but a great number of people still suffer from food insecurities. Moreover, the probability of being food insecure has been reported to decrease with increasing income. Amartya Sen argues that ownership of food is one of the most primitive property rights. However, even when food supplies are sufficient, there can be food insecurity.

Between 2003 and 2005, the total Mexican food supply was sufficient, averaging 3,270 kilocalories per daily capita, higher than the minimum requirements of 1,850 kilocalories per daily capita. The National Survey of Wholesale, Food and Nutritional Status in Rural Areas (ENAAEN) data gathered in 2008 for 90 rural areas found that more than 90% of localities in these areas sold foods such as dry beans, chick peas, dairy and meat, 86.7% sold vegetables, and 78.9% sold fruit. This data results in the conclusion that food availability is not the problem; rather, the issue of food insecurity is caused by an interplay of other factors.

Furthermore, more than 18% of the Mexican population in 2008 was in food poverty with Chiapas, Guerrero, and Oaxaca being the states with the most severe food poverty, according to a CONEVAL analysis. The vulnerability and dependence on food price increases is higher for the lower income deciles.

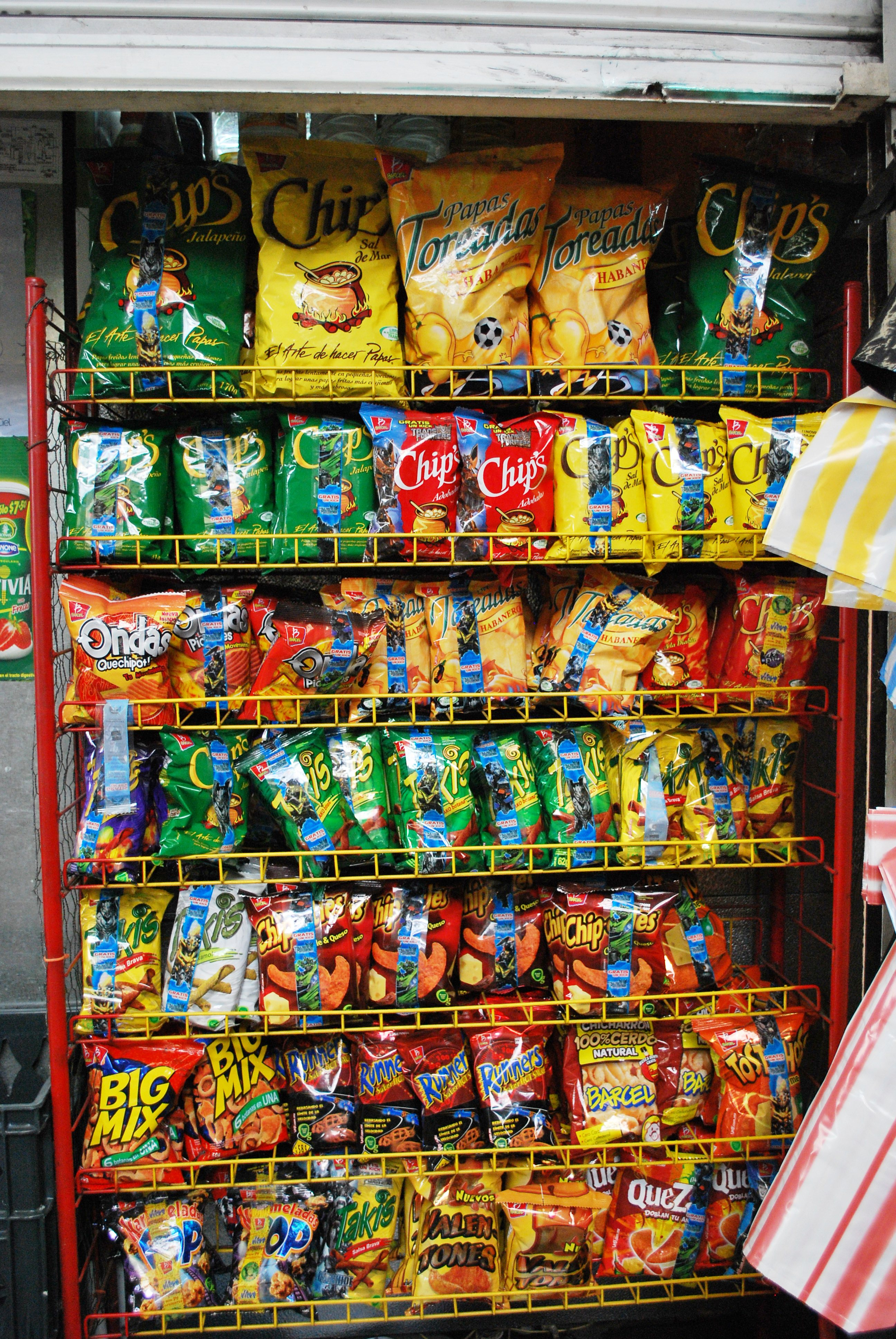
Rack with Mexican-brand snack food at a convenience store near Estadio Azteca in Mexico City

According to Mexico's National Public Health Institute, few households meet what the guidelines for an adequate and diverse diet For indigenous populations, the problem is worse. Only 10% of the non-indigenous rural population and 3% of the rural indigenous population consume meat three or more days per week, pointing to the prevalence of anemia in the population.

=== Dietary concerns ===
In 2013, Mexico was ranked fourth globally and first in Latin America in per capita spending on ultra-processed foods and drinks.

== Factors of food insecurity ==
=== Malnutrition ===
Adequate nutrition and food are fundamental for human survival, health, and growth. Malnutrition contributes to maternal and infant mortality and morbidity and diminishes development. Childhood malnutrition could be pointed to as a consequence of inequity in the distribution of resources, services, wealth, and opportunities.

In Mexico, although the prevalence of malnutrition has been decreasing, it continues to be a health issue where policies aimed at reducing food poverty have not been effective. 13.5% of children under five still suffer from chronic undernutrition and nearly 35 thousand have lost their lives because of this problem.

Chronic malnutrition is much more prevalent in the south and rural areas than in the north and in urban ones. The indigenous population in Mexico faces a significantly more severe situation. For instance, over 33% of children under five suffer from chronic malnutrition, which trumps the national average.

=== Obesity ===
Chart that shows the percentage of total population (aged 15 and above) with a body mass index greater than 30, compiled or collected from 1996 to 2003

Mexico has experienced a dramatic increase in wealth in recent decades, bringing a significant shift in socio-economic status and a geographical shift from rural to urban. This transformation has brought about harmful dietary patterns: increased access to low-priced highly energy-dense foods and an increase in sedentary behavior. As a result, Mexico is witnessing a rapidly growing epidemic of obesity and obesity related non-communicable diseases.

The main factors to which the rise in obesity have been attributed to are the increase in the consumption of hyper-caloric foods that are rich in fat, salt, and sugar and poor in important nutrients such as vitamins, minerals, and fiber as well as the decrease in physical activity.

The dramatic increase in obesity rates has resulted in higher rates of obesity-related diseases such as diabetes, hypertension, and acute myocardial infarction (AMI) and an increase in related healthcare costs. 32% of men and 26% of women were said to be of normal weight. It is estimated that by 2050, 12% of men and 9% of women will be of normal weight. Economically, this will be a large burden. It is estimated that a 1% reduction in BMI could save 43 million $US in healthcare costs in 2020 and 85 million $US in 2050. Therefore, it is important that measures be taken for the prevention of obesity.

== Government efforts ==
In 1997, the Mexican government started a new program aimed at relieving extreme poverty in the country. Programa de Educación, Salud, y Alimenación (PROGRESA) was initially implemented for poor households in rural areas, but due to its success, it was expanded to urban areas in 2001. Around 2.6 million families participated by 2000, including a third of all rural families. The program involved a cash reward for families that undertook actions to improve the health and nutritional status of their household. The program was relatively successful: attendance in secondary school increased by more than 20% for girls and 10% for boys in PROGRESA households.

The National Crusade against Hunger (CNCH) started in 2013 and was implemented by the federal government through the Secretariat of Social Development (SEDESOL). Its objective included "massively abolishing poverty, undernutrition, and food deprivation resulting from lack of access to food in Mexico." According to the CONEVAL, the CNCH has reached 7.1 million Mexicans. It includes interventions run by 55 preexisting programs in the fields of health and nutrition services, food production and distribution, and social and educational development, among others. The two participants with the largest budgets in 2013 were the Opportunidades Program and the Ministry of Health. The CNCH campaign started in 400 municipalities with the highest numbers and percentages of people living in conditions of extreme poverty and food insecurity. Its initial three priorities were boosting food supply and provision actions, increasing the number of families with access to money transfers and food supplements, and increasing the capacity of the population for acquiring food.

Some studies report that households receiving cash transfers and enrolled in social health insurance were not protected against food insecurity during the 2008 crisis. However, the program that provided cash grants to the elderly population (i.e. above 70 years old) did protect households against food insecurity.
