= Margarito Flores García =

20th-century Mexican Catholic priest, martyr, and saint

Saint Margarito Flores García
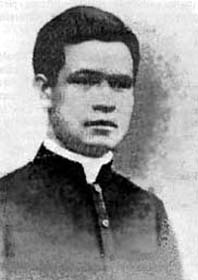

Martyr
- Born: February 22, 1899; Taxco de Alarcón
- Died: November 12, 1927 (aged 28); Tulimán
- Venerated in: Catholic Church
- Beatified: 22 November, 1992, St. Peter's Basilica by John Paul II
- Canonized: 21 May, 2000, St. Peter's Square by John Paul II
- Major shrine: Taxco de Alarcón
- Feast: 12 November

Margarito Flores García (22 February, 1899 – 12 November, 1927) was a Catholic priest who was canonized in 2000. During his ministry in Chilpancingo-Chilapa, he was persecuted in the Mexican Revolution and died as a martyr.

== Biography ==
Margarito Flores García was born to Germán Flores and García Merced at Taxco de Alarcón in the Mexican state of Guerrero. From a young age, he was forced to labor in the fields to help support his poverty-stricken family. At 15 he began studying in the seminary at Chilopie.

Garcia received Holy Orders from Bishop José Guadalupe Ortiz on 5 April, 1924 and celebrated his first mass at his hometown church of Santa Prisca y San Sebastian on 20 April, 1924. Initially, he ministered in the Chilopie seminary as a vicar while effectively preventing the expansion of breakaway sects. Soon, the persecution of Catholics intensified. In 1926, president Plutoco Elías Calles published a government decree requiring priests to leave parish ministry and live in the cities in order to be monitored by the federal government. Garcia was inspired to stay in the region after the martyrdom of David Uribe Velasco. Velasco chose to minister clandestinely where the church was undergoing intensive attacks and where its people were in the greatest danger.

In the same year – under the influence of increasing repression – the clergy were moved from Chilpancingo to Tecapulco. García continued his studies at the Academia de San Carlos. He was arrested in June of the following year (1927) and imprisoned along with members of the "League for the Defense of Religious Liberty". After intervention by the family of General Roberto Cruz, Flores García was released. In November, according to a complex request, he was sent to minister as pastor of the parish in the village of Atenango del Río. Prior to Garcia's arrival in the village, local government authorities had already killed every other priest located in the town. Shortly after his arrival in the village, García was arrested and dragged on a rope in front of the general in Tulimán. He was shot to death on November 12, 1927, by government forces. Police commissioner Crus Pineda had tried to help the priest, but he was shot and killed by federal authorities at a later date.

In 1925, García's relics were moved to a chapel in his home parish of Taxco. Investigation of the heroic virtue of Garcia's life began in his local diocese in 1933 and was completed in 1988. García was beatified by Pope John Paul II on 22 November 1992 in St. Peter's Basilica. John Paul II also canonized García, along with Cristóbal Magallanes Jara and companions, on May 21, 2000, on St. Peter's Square. His feast is celebrated on 12 November.
