= Marcelo Tecolapa =

Mexican politician

- Born: 25 October 1960 (age 65); Zitlala, Guerrero, Mexico
- Occupation: Politician
- Political party: PRI

Marcelo Tecolapa Tixteco (born 25 October 1960) is a Mexican politician affiliated with the Institutional Revolutionary Party (PRI). In the 2003 mid-terms he was elected to the Chamber of Deputies to represent the sixth district of Guerrero during the 59th Congress.
