= Samantha Fonseca =

Mexican activist and politician

- Samantha Gómez Fonseca
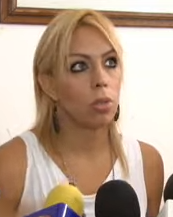
- Fonseca in 2011

Personal details
- Born: 13 October 1987 Monterrey, Nuevo León, Mexico
- Died: 14 January 2024 (aged 37) Xochimilco, Mexico City, Mexico
- Cause of death: Assassination
- Resting place: Panteón Jardines, Tlalnepantla de Baz, State of Mexico
- Party: Morena
- Other political affiliations: Labor Party; Citizens' Movement; New Alliance Party
- Profession: LGBTQ rights and prisoners' rights activist

Samantha Carolina Gómez Fonseca (13 October 1987 – 14 January 2024) was a Mexican politician and a prisoners' rights and LGBTQ rights activist. She was shot dead on 14 January 2024, in Mexico City. At the time of her killing, she was a pre-candidate from the Morena Party for the Senate of the Republic.

== Biography ==
=== Early life ===
Fonseca was born in Monterrey, Nuevo León, and studied law and business administration. In 2007, a former roommate accused her of aggravated robbery and attempted homicide, charges she denied. She was incarcerated at the men's Reclusorio Preventivo Varonil Norte prison, despite her gender identity of a trans woman. In prison, she suffered physical abuse and sexual assault by other inmates. She was released after three months due to a lack of evidence. Lawyer Jaime López Vela of the Agenda LGBT organization aided in her release.

=== Career ===
After her release, López Vela introduced her to the Labor Party (PT), where she joined the Office of Sexual Diversity Attention in Cuauhtémoc. She rose through the party ranks, eventually becoming a national coordinator for sexual diversity and gender equity. During her time at PT, she contributed to drafting the Law on Sexual Diversity, which was presented to the Senate of the Republic. She consistently visited prisons throughout Mexico to speak to prisoners on rights' violations, help with social reintegration, give workshops, and hold organized events for the benefit of inmates.

She later joined the Citizens' Movement party, where she served as a secretary of Human Rights in the Federal District. She became a candidate in the June 2016 Constituent Assembly of Mexico City elections for the New Alliance Party. In May 2023, she was nominated for the Medal of Merit for Human Rights Defenders 2022 by the Congress of Mexico City. In November 2023, she registered as a Senate candidate for the Morena party.

== Assassination ==
On 14 January 2024, hours before her killing, Fonseca posted on social media supporting a protest against institutional transphobia the following day. That day, Fonseca visited the Reclusorio Sur men's prison in the Tepalcatlalpan neighborhood of Mexico City, speaking with prisoners. Fonseca entered into a DiDi ridesharing vehicle after leaving the prison. Several bullets shot at Fonseca into the vehicle in the borough of Xochimilco, killing her instantly. She was 36 years old. Various Morena politicians, LGBT+ organizations and activists condemned the murder. The Attorney General of Mexico City announced an investigation into the killing as an act of transfemicide. She was the fourth transgender person killed in Mexico in 2024, being killed three days after the killing of Miriam Noemi Ríos, another transgender woman and activist, in Jacona, Michoacán.

The following day, during the protest that she had planned to attend, marchers protested her killing and called for more comprehensive hate crime laws. She was buried at Panteón Jardines in Tlalnepantla on 16 January 2024.
