= Marco Matias =

Marco Matias is the name of:

- Marco Matias (footballer) (born 1989), Portuguese footballer
- Marco Matias (musician) (born 1975), Portuguese-German musician
- Marco Matías (politician) (born 1956), Mexican politician
