= Raúl Homero González Villalva =

Mexican politician (born 1950)

- Born: 1 November 1950 (age 75); Chilapa de Álvarez, Guerrero, Mexico
- Occupation: Politician
- Political party: PRI

Raúl Homero González Villalva (born 1 November 1950) is a Mexican politician from the Institutional Revolutionary Party (PRI). In the 2000 general election he was elected to the Chamber of Deputies to represent the sixth district of Guerrero during the 58th session of Congress.
