= Ahuacuotzingo (municipality) =

Municipality in the Mexican state of Guerrero

- Municipality
- Coat of arms

- Location in Mexico Ahuacuotzingo (Mexico)
- Coordinates: 17°43′N 99°32′W
- Country: Mexico
- State: Guerrero
- Municipal seat: Ahuacuotzingo

Area
  - Total: 388.4 km^{2} (150.0 sq mi)

Population (2005)
  - Total: 4,543

Ahuacuotzingo is a municipality in the Mexican state of Guerrero. The municipal seat lies at Ahuacuotzingo. The municipality covers an area of 388.4 km^{2} (150.0 mi^{2}).

As of 2005, the municipality had a total population of 4,543.

== Name origins ==
The name Ahuacuotzingo comes from the Nahuatl words agua (oak), evo (yellow), tam (diminutive), and the locative suffix -co; it is interpreted as "In the yellow oak" or "In the small oak grove."

== History ==
Before the arrival of the Spanish, this region was inhabited by the Tlapanec people, who paid tribute to Tenochtitlan. The area was conquered by Hernán Cortés in 1534. Evangelization was carried out by Jerónimo de San Esteban and Agustín de Coruña, both Augustinian friars. The municipality was initially under the jurisdiction of the Diocese of Tlaxcala, later of Puebla, and finally of Chilapa.

== Geographic description ==
=== Location ===
Ahuacuotzingo is located in the central-eastern part of the state of Guerrero, between the coordinates 17° 43' north latitude and 99° 32' west longitude, at an altitude of 1,515 meters above sea level. The municipality borders the municipality of Copalillo to the north; Atlixtac and Chilapa to the south; Olinalá and Cualac to the east; and Zitlala to the west.

=== Orography and hydrography ===
The terrain is mostly rugged, with elevations reaching up to 2,000 meters above sea level. Notable hills include Lobera, Xumiltzin, Polantitlán, Zoyatla, and Teshuayo. The municipality is part of the Balsas hydrological region. The main rivers are Petatlán, Mitlancingo, and Pochoapa, along with the streams Duraznal, Berros, and Ahuehuetes.

=== Climate ===
The climate is generally dry and temperate, with rainfall occurring in the summer, from June to September. The average annual temperature is 16 °C, with a maximum of 37 °C and a minimum of 15 °C. The average annual precipitation is approximately 1,100 millimeters.

== Places of interest ==
- Parish of Saint Anthony the Abbot
- La Casa Grande (The Great House)
- El Encanto
- La Lobera
- Natural pools of La Toma and La Ahuehuetla ravines
- Pochuteco River and its pedestrian hammocks or hanging wooden bridges
- Regional mezcal distilleries
- Traditional sugarcane mills for producing piloncillo (panocha), "batidillos," and crystallized pumpkin ("calabazas entachatadas")
- The Virgin of Lourdes Cavern
- Caves along the Pochuteco River where codices attributed to General Emiliano Zapata were reportedly found

== Festivals ==
Religious festivals

- Feast of the Holy Cross: May 3
- Xilocruz Day: September 14
- Feast of the Virgin of Guadalupe: December 12
- Festival in honor of Saint Anthony the Abbot: January 16 and 17
- Festival in honor of the Virgin of the Rosary: October 6 and 7

Civil holidays

- Anniversary of the Mexican War of Independence: September 16
