= Miriam Noemí Ríos =

Mexican activist (1985–2024)

- Born: 1985; Zamora de Hidalgo, Michoacán, Mexico
- Died: 11 January 2024 (aged 38–39); Zamora de Hidalgo, Michoacán, Mexico
- Cause of death: Assassination
- Occupations: Human rights activist Politician
- Years active: 2020–2024
- Political party: Citizens' Movement

Miriam Noemí Ríos Ríos (1985 – 11 January 2024) was a Mexican politician and human rights activist. She was a leader of the State Operational Commission of the Citizens' Movement Party (MC) in the state of Michoacán.

== Activism ==
Ríos joined the Citizens' Movement Party in 2020, and was a candidate for city councilor for MC in the 2021 local elections. She worked as director for the municipal committee in Jacona de Plancarte, Michoacán.

== Personal life ==
Ríos was born in 1985 in Zamora de Hidalgo, Michoacán. She was transgender.

=== Assassination ===
On 11 January 2024, Ríos was assassinated on Juárez Avenue in the Libertad neighborhood of Zamora de Hidalgo. Politicians of her party and fellow activists in the community such as Vive Libre Jacona condemned the killing, which they referred to as transfemicide, and demanded the police investigate the case. She was one of nearly 3 dozen Mexican politicians who were killed in the lead up to the 2024 elections.
