= Mexican Red Cross =

Humanitarian assistance organization

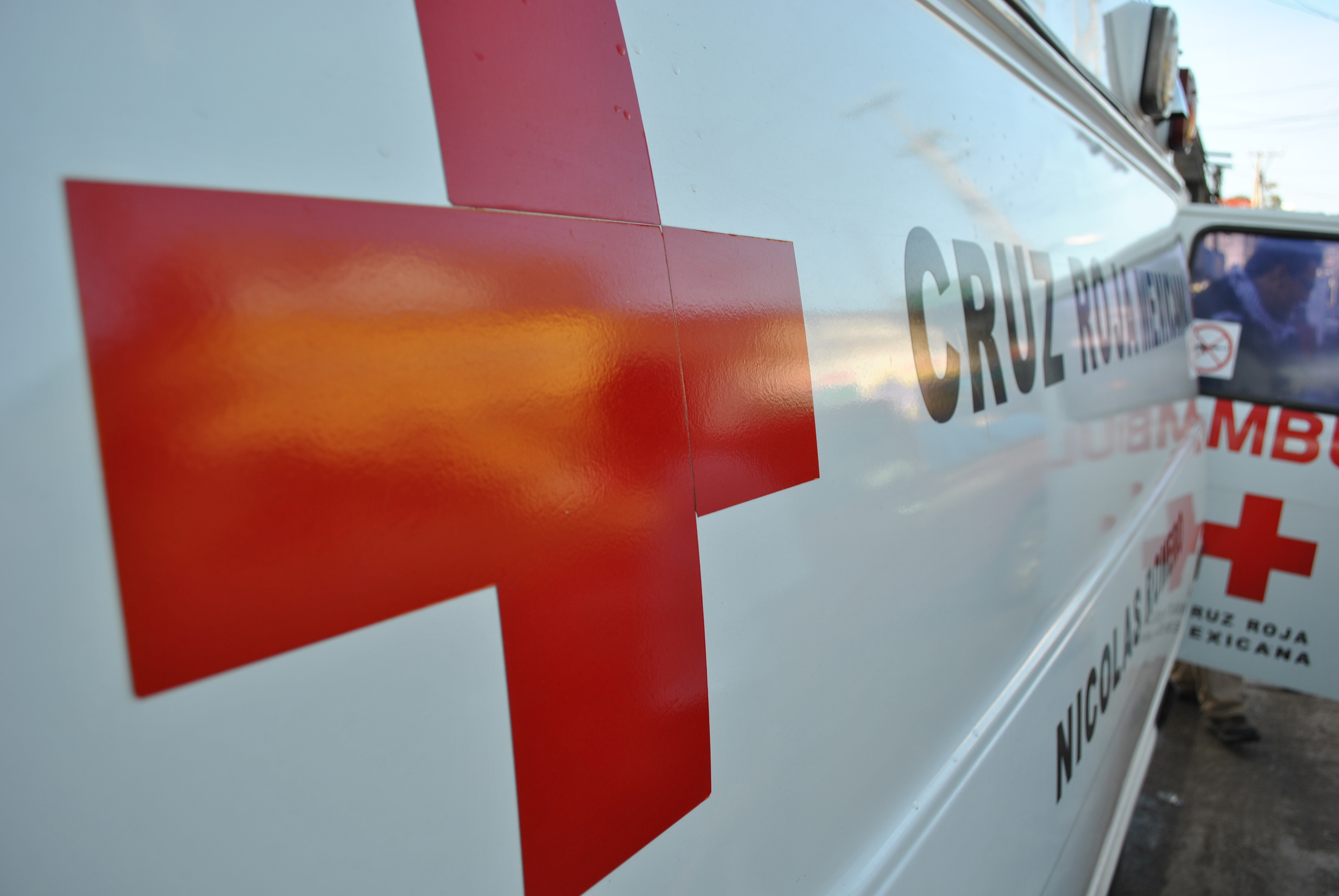
View of a Mexican Red Cross ambulance

The Mexican Red Cross (Spanish: Cruz Roja Mexicana) is a non-governmental humanitarian assistance organization affiliated with the International Federation of Red Cross and Red Crescent Societies to help those in dangerous situations, such as natural disasters, as well as providing human health services. The organization finances its aid, assistance, and education programs through the work of thousands of volunteers and donation from individuals, institutions, organizations, associations and companies. It originated with a presidential decree in 1910 and was recognized internationally in 1912. Today it participates in national and international aid and disaster relief missions as well as various health services, training in first aid and for emergency medical technicians. Early in its history, it developed a program in nursing, which eventually became the Escuela Nacional de Enfermería y Obstetricia (National School of Nursing and Obstectrics), today part of the National Autonomous University of Mexico.

== History ==
The organization's history began in 1898, when the Spanish Red Cross inquired to the government of Mexico about the creation of public institutions to cooperate with military medical units. In 1907, President Porfirio Díaz signed a decree to have Mexico adhere to the Geneva Convention of 1864, especially to improve the care of the wounded and sick on battlefields. Two years later, the first provisional board of the Mexican Red Cross was established, which assisted in the floods in the city of Monterrey in 1909. The country's first brigade carrying Red Cross insignia left Mexico City for the stricken Monterrey and their efforts were recognized by the Mexican federal government.

The success of this first effort led to a 1910 presidential decree that provided official recognition to the Mexican Red Cross, allowing for the first official board to be created that same year. In 1912, the organization received international recognition through the International Committee of the Red Cross (ICRC). The first national convention was held in 1940 and in 1950, the Mexican Red Cross and the Ministry of Defense signed an agreement establishing their relations during peacetime. In 1968, Mexican Red Cross's main hospital opened in the Polanco neighborhood of Mexico City.

== Uniforms and logo ==
Members and volunteers with the Mexican Red Cross are authorized to wear Red Cross insignia. The Mexican version is nine cm by seven cm badge with a white background. It has a red cross consisting of five equal squares. Underneath the words "Cruz Roja Mexicana" appear in Arial bold black. Indications of specific sectors and programs appear on the outer edge and a lower band with specific sizes. Identification cards have a color coding system which indicate the types of services the affiliate provides. White is for those in administration, red for volunteers, light blue for medical services, dark blue for other care services, dark green for training and orange for other types of services.

== Activities ==
The activities of the Mexican Red Cross can be divided into three different sections: volunteer and other worker processing, integration/participation, and assistance/development. The first is designed to generate and update the volunteer databases, integrate the records of the database, provide information regarding the registration process, and credential and update current partners. The integration and participation section consists of plans, projects, general activities of the National Society, specific operational and administrative activities of the areas, committees, commissions, internal or external activities exclusive to volunteer area, and programs derived from the requests of collaboration with similar organizations through institutional agreements. The last section is in charge of the volunteering management instruction, monitoring of the institutional awards system, and following the provisions of the National Ethics Committee relating to sanctions.

The Mexican Red Cross annually offers training for emergency medical technicians. Course requirements include being over age 18, in good health and fitness, high school diploma, attitude of service, discipling and passing the physical, psychological and skills exams.

== History of the School of Nursing ==
Training in medical specialties began with the organization as early as 1910, with short courses in first aid. Soon after, they began offering nursing courses as well at two hospitals in Mexico City. In 1925, these courses were adapted to the requirements of the Secretariat of Public Education to organize the Escuela Clínica de Enfermeras de la Cruz Roja Mexicana (Clinic School of Nurses of the Mexican Red Cross). The first graduate was C. Bertha Herver Ritler, which went on to receive a scholarship to go to London and take an instructors course. In 1936, this school is integrated into the National Autonomous University of Mexico, making it the first of its kind in Mexico at the university level. It remained an integral part of the university until 1998, when the university established the Escuela Nacional de Enfermería y Obstetrica (National School of Nursing and Obstetrics) which is semi autonomous from the main university system.

== International and national aid missions ==
Over the years the Mexican Red Cross has participated in a number of high-profile efforts related to disasters and public health. One of the first was the participation of the Red Cross hospital to treat victims of the 1968 student uprising. In the 1980s, the organization provided organized relief for the waves of refugees from Guatemala in Chiapas and other parts of the south of Mexico. It has also participated in relief efforts after various hurricanes hit Mexico in various places.

One major event for the organization was the aftermath of the 1985 Mexico City earthquake. Shortly after the event, rescue brigades appeared but the scale of the damage and death was more than they could handle. Not only were there too few, many were under-equipped lacking spikes, sledgehammers, machinery and special equipment. There were also shortages of medicines and blood for medical facilities. Four days after the disaster, on September 23, patients confined to bed, from the Red Cross Polanco, were rearranged in rooms that were decorated with flowers, stuffed animals and even television in order to distract them from the tragic incident.

One recent effort is the collaboration of the Mexican Red Cross with the National Crusade Against Hunger, sponsored by the Mexican federal government. Red Cross participation includes educational programs and the raising of resources. Educational programs include those for mothers caring for infants and those for hospital patients. This also includes workshops on urban gardens and those to teach children about healthy eating habits. The Red Cross mans collection centers for money and supplies and works to distribute these resources in 120 municipalities.

Apart from solely providing aid to people in their nation, the Mexican Red Cross has helped victims of natural or social disasters in other countries. One of these is their participation in relief efforts after Hurricane Katrina, sending food and other supplies.
