= Cochoapa el Grande =

City in the Mexican state of Guerrero

- Municipal seat and city
- Location in Mexico Cochoapa el Grande (Mexico)
- Coordinates: 25°06′N 106°34′W
- Country: Mexico
- State: Guerrero
- Municipality: Cochoapa el Grande
- Time zone: UTC-6 (Zona Centro)

Cochoapa el Grande is a city and is the seat of the municipality of Cochoapa el Grande, in the southern Mexican state of Guerrero.
