= National Crusade Against Hunger (Mexico) =

The National Crusade Against Hunger (Cruzada Nacional Contra el Hambre or CNCH) is a program sponsored by the Mexican government. Its main purpose is to significantly reduce hunger and poverty in Mexico through social intervention, increasing the general socio economic status of the communities by the development of infrastructure. It was announced on December 1, 2012 by Mexican president Enrique Peña Nieto during his inauguration. The program started on January 21, 2013 with an event in Las Margaritas, Chiapas.

== Objectives ==
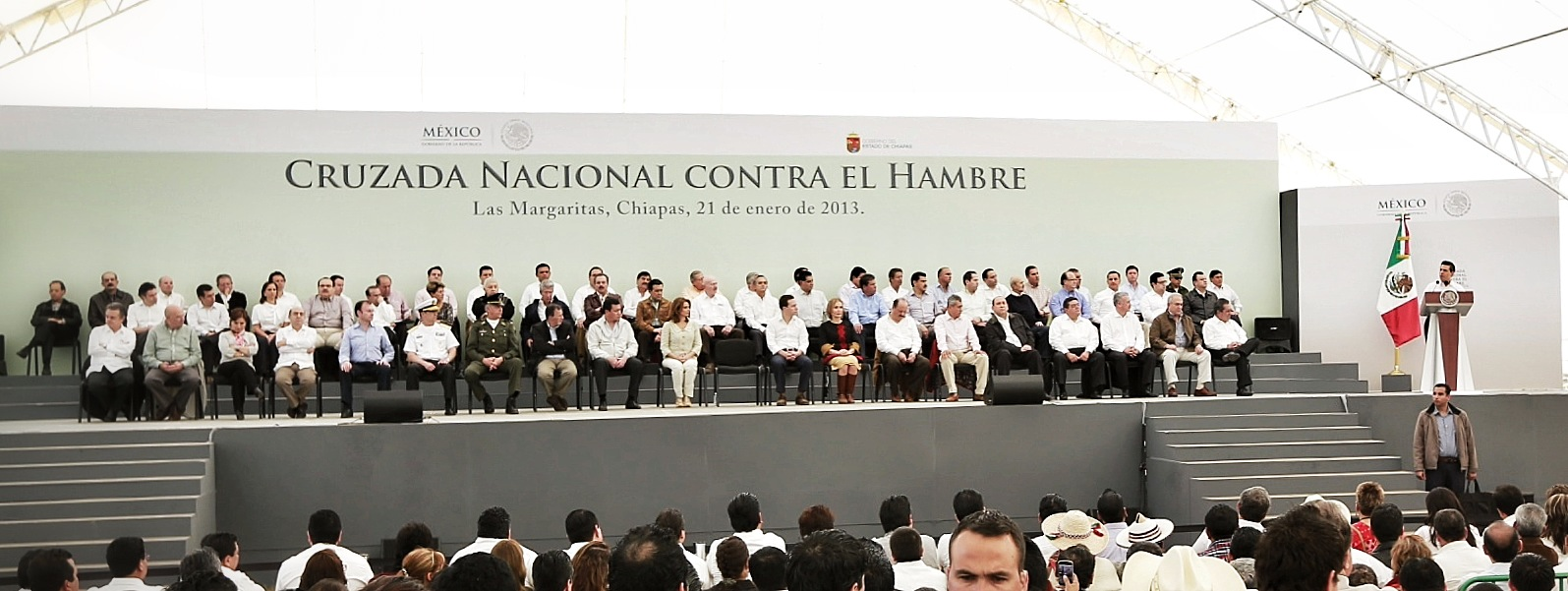
CruzadaNacionalContraElHambre

The program is based on five principal objectives, centered on hunger, food production and community participation. The two hunger objectives are to eliminate hunger in extremely impoverished communities, and eradicate acute malnutrition in children. The two food production objectives are to cut down losses of after harvesting, and of food in storage, transportation, distribution, and commercialization; as well as to increase both food production, and the profit of farmers. Finally, the last objective is to promote community participation to achieve the other four objectives.

The Secretariat of Social Development (Secretaría de Desarrollo Social or SEDESOL) is responsible for the program to help 7.4 million Mexicans with hunger in 400 municipalities. This will be done with the cooperation of federal, state and municipal programs, such as the PROCAMPO campaign sponsored by SAGARPA, the online organization sinhambre.org, various local communities. The crusade will also include the production of photography, short films, mural paintings, and music contests, with April named as the Month of the Crusade.

== Intersectoral Commission ==
According to the Article Six of the Decreto por el que se establece el Sistema Nacional para la Cruzada contra el Hambre, the Intersectoral Commission coordinates programs and actions to accomplish the five main objectives of the Crusade. The commission is formed by the secretaries of 16 state secretariats and three national social institutions. It is presided by Rosario Robles Berlanga, minister of SEDESOL.

== Associated companies and institutions ==
Different institutions, companies and associations have affiliated to work with the program. These include universities, non-governmental organizations (NGOs) and multinational food companies. Four of the most important universities in Mexico have agreed to work with the program: the Metropolitan Autonomous University (UAM) and the National Autonomous University of Mexico (UNAM), the Monterrey Institute of Technology and Higher Education (ITESM) (Instituto Tecnológico de Estudios Superiores de Monterrey or ITESM) and the National Polytechnic Institute (IPN). Students in these universities will be able to complete their social service in the communities being served by the program. UAM is in charge of the pilot program in the state of Guerrero, while UNAM's participation focuses on social research.

Participating NGO's include "A Kilo of Help" (Un kilo de Ayuda or UKA) which will help by focusing attention on the children's program. In addition, the Mexican Red Cross will help through eight defined actions: an educative program for preventative health, and life of children; nutrition education; the creation of the basic workshop on collection centers; urban garden and house technology and a children's workshop on alimentary habits. Mexican Red Cross will also help with logistics and distribution of basic needs, census-taking, and evaluation of damages in case of disasters, health caravans, food delivery and the Ruta contra el hambre (Route against hunger) in 120 municipalities.

The multinational companies are Nestlé and PepsiCo. Nestlé will donate 200 thousand hours in formative nutrition courses in the communities, help 15 thousand homeowners to become micro-enterprises, as well as help in the agricultural development of their milk and coffee providers. Similarly, PepsiCo will help in the development of scientific advances in food products, the creation of sustainable productive projects in poor communities, with product donation, as well as aiding in case of disaster in any of the communities in the program.

== Accomplishments ==
In April 2013, a series of agreements were signed including those with the universities, NGO's, multinational corporations. Additionally, the Integral Agreement for the Inclusive Social Development- National Crusade Against Hunger was signed with the governor of the Mexican state of Hidalgo. This was done to further align the already existing programs with the Crusade. Moreover, the official “starting signal” was given on April 19 by Luiz Inácio Lula da Silva in Zinacantán, Chiapas, which will deploy the first groups of the crusade to gather information of the needs in the communities. Finally, the programs for the following months of the Crusade were established. Some of these include the “Observer Children” program, which donates cameras to children to document the changes in their communities. Another program is the Nutritional Orientation Networks “The Crusades” to educate 500 thousand women on the importance of nutrition, growth and development on children.

The Crusade began work on January 21, 2013 in two communities in the Mexican state of Guerrero: the municipality of Mártir de Cuilapán, and the neighborhood of Simón Bolivar, Acapulco. In Mártir de Culiapán, campaigns for water accessibility, reforestation, and temporary employment were implemented with involvement of the community. Meanwhile, in the neighborhood of Simón Bolivar, an oral health day was organized with the help of odontology residents from the Autonomous University of Guerrero along with a temporary employment program, which created 150 jobs for the people of the community, working with the Mexican Army to clean a river that flows through the neighborhood.

== Criticism ==
Because of the size and ambition of the program, it has received some criticism by politicians of the opposition and academics alike. For example, Gonzalo Hernández Licona, president of National Council for the Evaluation of Social Development Policy (Consejo Nacional de Evaluación de la Política de Desarrollo Social or CONEVAL) has stated that the reduction of poverty is impossible if only social programs are implemented. He adds that economic growth is also required. Additionally he mentioned the difficulty of coordinating various independent social programs towards the same end. He fears the program has political-electoral interests, as many of the communities are governed by the opposition parties.

José Luis de la Cruz Gallegos, director of the Research Center for Economy and Business at the Monterrey Institute of Technology and Higher Education, State of Mexico wrote an article pointing out many of the challenges the Crusade must overcome. Firstly, he points out that while food will be provided, nutrition is not properly accounted for. Especially, since food consumption in the rural and urban communities is very different. He adds that there is a problem not only with unemployment, but also the lack of education. He says that it will be impossible to maintain a stable economy in the communities if there is no improvement in education. Finally, he mentions that the crusade must maintain long term social development, promoting the growth of communication, transport, security, public education, public health, water disponibility, the agricultural sector, economy, and job security.<ref=José/>

However, the program has received mixed reviews from international organizations as FAO. According to FAO's general director, Jose Graziano da Silva, the Crusade has all the ingredients for success, and it has been criticized for its apparent political use, as “Hambre Cero”, a similar social program from Brazil proposed Da Silva. According to him, Mexico has a lot of potential, but is lacking emphasis on food production, even though Mexico is one of the greatest agricultural producers in the world.
