= Alicia Zamora Villalva =

Mexican politician

- Born: 16 April 1964 (age 62); Guerrero, Mexico
- Occupation: Politician
- Political party: PRI

Alicia Elizabeth Zamora Villalva (born 16 April 1964) is a Mexican politician from the Institutional Revolutionary Party (PRI). In the 2009 mid-terms she was elected to the Chamber of Deputies to represent the sixth district of Guerrero during the 61st Congress.
