= Quechultenango =

City in the Mexican state of Guerrero

- Municipal seat and city

- Location within Guerrero Location within Mexico
- Coordinates: 17°24′53″N 99°14′28″W
- Country: Mexico
- State: Guerrero
- Municipality: Quechultenango
- Time zone: UTC-6 (Zona Centro)

Quechultenango is a city and seat of the municipality of Quechultenango, in the Mexican state of Guerrero.
