= Ahuacuotzingo =

City in the Mexican state of Guerrero

- Municipal seat and city
- Location in Mexico Ahuacuotzingo (Mexico)
- Coordinates: 17°42′N 98°55′W
- Country: Mexico
- State: Guerrero
- Municipality: Ahuacuotzingo

Ahuacuotzingo is a city and seat of the Ahuacuotzingo Municipality, in the state of Guerrero, southern Mexico. Ahuacuotzingo is known in the region as one of the most important producers of maize.
