= Irma Figueroa Romero =

Mexican politician

- Born: 25 September 1945 (age 80); Huetamo, Michoacán, Mexico
- Occupation: Politician
- Political party: PRD

Irma Sinforina Figueroa Romero (Note: In this Mexican name, the surname is Figueroa and the second or maternal family name is Romero.) (born 25 September 1945) is a Mexican politician affiliated with the Party of the Democratic Revolution (PRD). In the 2003 mid-terms she was elected to the Chamber of Deputies to represent the 10th district of Guerrero during the 59th Congress.
