= La Montaña de Guerrero =

Region in the Mexican state of Guerrero

- Region
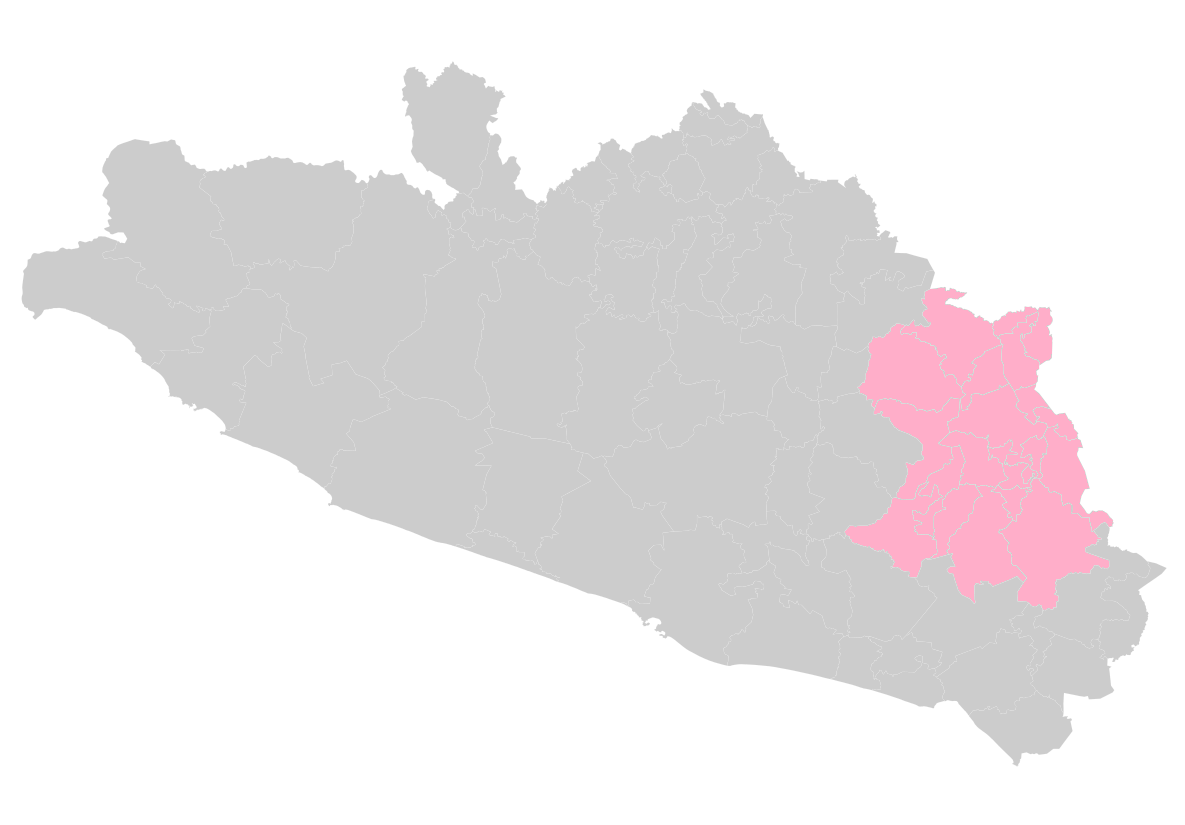
- The La Montaña region of Guerrero.
- Country: Mexico
- State: Guerrero
- Time zone: UTC-6 (Zona Centro)

La Montaña de Guerrero (Spanish for The Mountain of Guerrero) is a cultural and geographic region in the eastern portion of the Mexican state of Guerrero, bordering on Oaxaca and Puebla. The largest municipality in the region is Tlapa de Comonfort, with a population of 96,125 as of 2020.

== Ethnic breakdown ==
Much of the population is indigenous, being made up of either Nahua, Mixteco, Amuzgo, or Tlapanec origin.

== Socioeconomic status ==
The La Montaña region of Guerrero is a historically poor area when compared to the rest of Mexico. Roughly 23% of the residents in this region are considered to be under extreme poverty compared to just 5.3% across Mexico as a whole.

Overall, the Human Development Index (HDI) of La Montaña de Guerrero is .515. Some municipalities in the region have lower levels of opportunities than others, with Cochoapa el Grande achieving an HDI score of .420 and an extreme poverty rate of 82.6%.

== Representation in Media ==
- La Montaña de Guerrero: Tierra de Mujeres Migrantes (Spanish for The Guerrero Mountain: Land of Women Migrants) - A short documentary released in 2014 by the human rights organization Tlachinollan Centro de Derechos Humanos de la Montaña (Tlachinollan Mountain Human Rights Center). This documentary, shown at the International Media Festival for Prevention, "shows the reality faced by indigenous women who are employed as agricultural day laborours in the fields of three different entities of the Mexican Republic."
- La Voz de La Montaña (Spanish for The Voice of the Mountain) - A public radio broadcast for the region since 1979. Spoken in Nahuatl, Mixtec, Tlapanec, and Spanish.
