= Copalillo =

City in the Mexican state of Guerrero

- Municipal seat and city
- Location in Mexico Copalillo (Mexico)
- Coordinates: 18°2′N 99°7′W
- Country: Mexico
- State: Guerrero
- Municipality: Copalillo
- Time zone: UTC-6 (Zona Centro)

Copalillo is a city and seat of the municipality of Copalillo, in the state of Guerrero, southern Mexico.
