= Carlos de Jesús Alejandro =

Mexican politician

- Born: 4 November 1965 (age 60); Mexico
- Education: IPN; UAM
- Occupation: Politician
- Political party: PRD

Carlos de Jesús Alejandro (born 4 November 1965) is a Mexican politician affiliated with the Party of the Democratic Revolution (PRD). In the 2012 general election he was elected to the Chamber of Deputies to represent the sixth district of Guerrero during the 62nd Congress.
