= Tigrada =

Festival in Mexico

Tigrada is a festival which is held every August 15 on the streets of the southwestern Mexican city of Chilapa de Álvarez.

In Tigrada parade, the townspeople, along with surrounding communities, honor the Virgin of the Assumption, and invoke Tepeyollotl, the Jaguar God and protector of the mountains, to ensure fertile earth and abundance of rainfall. This carnival has deep roots associated with Mesoamerican mythology and rituals.
