= Apango =

Town in the Mexican state of Guerrero

- Location in Mexico Apango (Mexico)
- Coordinates: 17°44′29″N 99°19′41″W
- Country: Mexico
- State: Guerrero
- Municipality: Mártir de Cuilapán
- Elevation: 4,000 ft (1,220 m)

Population (2005)
  - Total: 3 981
- Time zone: UTC-6 (Zona Centro)
- Postal code: 41 180

Apango (the municipal seat of Mártir de Cuilapán) is a town located in the Mexican state of Guerrero, approximately 35 km away from the state capital Chilpancingo. Nearby, a ruined temple which is the sole evidence of the Coixcas can be found.

== Demography ==
The Population and Housing count carried out in 2005 by the National Institute of Statistics, Geography and Data Processing indicated that the town had 3987 inhabitants - 1870 male and 2111 female.
