= David Sotelo Rosas =

Mexican politician

David Augusto Sotelo Rosas
- Born: 11 November 1957 (age 68); Acapulco, Guerrero, Mexico
- Education: Universidad Autónoma Metropolitana; UNAM
- Occupations: Politician and lawyer
- Political party: PRD

David Augusto Sotelo Rosas (born 11 November 1957) is a Mexican politician from the Party of the Democratic Revolution (PRD). In the 2000 general election he was elected to the Chamber of Deputies to represent the tenth district of Guerrero during the 58th Congress. He previously served in the Congress of Guerrero from 1989 to 1992.
