= Atlixtac =

City in the Mexican state of Guerrero

Atlixtac, Guerrero, Mexico
- Municipal seat and city
- Location in Mexico Atlixtac, Guerrero, Mexico (Mexico)
- Coordinates: 17°34′N 98°53′W
- Country: Mexico
- State: Guerrero
- Municipality: Atlixtac

Atlixtac is a city and seat of the municipality of Atlixtac, in the state of Guerrero, southern Mexico.
