= Marco Matías (politician) =

Mexican politician

Marco Matías Alonso
- Born: 25 April 1956 (age 70); Guerrero, Mexico
- Occupation: Politician
- Political party: PRD

Marco Matías Alonso (born 25 April 1956) is a Mexican politician affiliated with the Party of the Democratic Revolution (PRD). In the 2006 general election he was elected to the Chamber of Deputies to represent the sixth district of Guerrero during the 60th Congress.
