= List of politicians killed during the presidency of Claudia Sheinbaum =

The following is a list of assassinations (26) of politicians during the term in office of President of Mexico Claudia Sheinbaum, which started on 1 October 2024.

== 2024 ==
Name	Political affiliation	Date	Position	Notes
Francisco Tapia Gutiérrez	n/d	3 October	General secretary of the municipal government of Chilpancingo, Guerrero	Shot three days after taking office.
Alejandro Arcos Catalán	PRD	6 October	Municipal president (Note: A municipal president is the chief executive of a municipality, comparable to the mayor of a town or city.) of Chilpancingo de los Bravo, Guerrero	Abducted and decapitated after six days in office.
Román Ruiz Bohórquez	No party (planilla blanca)	12 October	Municipal president of Candelaria Loxicha, Oaxaca	Stabbed in an "interpersonal dispute".
Benito Aguas Atlahua	PVEM	9 December	Federal deputy (Note: A federal deputy is a member of the Chamber of Deputies.) for the 18th district of Veracruz	Shot in the municipality of Zongolica, Veracruz; another man was also killed.
Jesús Franco Lárraga	Morena	15 December	Municipal president of Tancanhuitz, San Luis Potosí	Intercepted by gunmen while driving; the three other occupants of the vehicle were also killed.

== 2025 ==
Name	Political affiliation	Date	Position	Notes
Carlos Neri Rodríguez	PVEM	7 February	Secretary of the municipal government and aspiring mayoral candidate in Paso del Macho, Veracruz	Abducted, along with his brother, in Camarón de Tejeda, Veracruz; both found dead the following day.
José Luis Perriera	PRI	28 April	General secretary of the municipal council of Teocaltiche, Jalisco	Shot and killed while dining at a restaurant.
Germán Anuar Valencia	MORENA	29 April	Mayoral candidate in Coxquihui, Veracruz	Killed when gunmen attacked his campaign headquarters; at least five bystanders were wounded.
Bladimir García Soriano		6 May	Director of public works in Ixtaczoquitlán, Veracruz	Shot dead upon leaving his home in Córdoba, Veracruz.
Cecilia Ruvalcaba	MC	9 May	Municipal councilwoman for Teocaltiche, Jalisco	Shot by three masked gunmen at the community hospital she worked at in the early morning hours of 9 May.
Yesenia Lara	MORENA	11 May	Mayoral candidate for Texistepec, Veracruz	Shot at a campaign event alongside three supporters.
Mario Hernández García		15 May	Municipal president of Santiago Amoltepec, Oaxaca	Ambushed on a highway near the municipal seat. Two police officers were also killed.
Ximena Guzmán Cuevas	MORENA	20 May	Private secretary (Guzmán) and adviser (Muñoz) to Head of Government Clara Brugada	Shot dead in morning rush-hour traffic by a gunman on Calzada de Tlalpan in Mexico City.
José Muñoz Vega	MORENA	20 May	Private secretary (Guzmán) and adviser (Muñoz) to Head of Government Clara Brugada	Shot dead in morning rush-hour traffic by a gunman on Calzada de Tlalpan in Mexico City.
Isaías Rojas Ramírez	PT	2 June	Municipal president of Metlatónoc, Guerrero	Died in hospital after being shot on Federal Highway 95D on 28 May.
Salvador Bastida García	PT	5 June	Municipal president of Tacámbaro, Michoacán	Died in hospital after being shot outside his home in Tacámbaro. His bodyguard was also killed.
Lilia Gema García Soto	MORENA	15 June	Municipal president of San Mateo Piñas, Oaxaca	Gunmen attacked the city hall, killing García Soto and another member of her administration. Two police officers were also injured.
Martha Laura Mendoza Mendoza	MORENA–PT	17 June	Municipal president of Tepalcatepec, Michoacán	Shot outside her home in central Tepalcatepec. Her husband was also killed and a son was seriously wounded.
Ignacio Alejandro Roaro Aguilar	PAN	5 July	Secretary of the municipal government and former municipal president of Apaseo el Alto, Guanajuato	Shot while playing basketball in a public park; another municipal official was injured.
Miguel Bahena Solórzano	PVEM	20 October	Municipal president of Pisaflores, Hidalgo	Shot by men on a motorcycle in the village of La Estancia.
Carlos Manzo Rodríguez	Independent	1 November	Municipal president of Uruapan, Michoacán	Shot during a Day of the Dead festival in Uruapan's city center.
Juan Carlos Mezhua Campos	Independent	23 November	Former mayor of Zongolica, Veracruz, and aspiring candidate for governor of Veracruz	Shot at his lime kiln in Piedras Blancas

== 2026 ==
Name	Political affiliation	Date	Position	Notes
Lucía Guadalupe Mora Ávalos	MORENA	12 May	Party coordinator in Valle de Allende, Chihuahua	Shot outside her home.
Joel Bravo Martínez	PAN	13 June	Municipal president of San Miguel Amatitlán, Oaxaca	Shot outside his home.
Benjamín Medrano Quezada	PRI	7 July	Former municipal president of Fresnillo, Zacatecas	Shot in Guadalajara, Jalisco.
Ignacio Castrejón Valdez	PAN	c. 18 July	Former municipal president of Sombrerete, Zacatecas	One of the ten bodies found in Zacatecas on 18 July.
Valentín Lavín Moreno	PVEM	22 July	Municipal president of Temoac, Morelos	Shot inside the municipal palace.
Zenyazen Escobar García	MORENA	c. 4 September	Federal deputy for the 16th federal electoral district of Veracruz	Shot, body found in Puente Nacional, Veracruz.
Amy Navarrete Arriola	PVEM	8 September	Former candidate for mayor of Matías Romero, Oaxaca; prospective candidate in the 2027 municipal elections.	Shot at a community festival in Paso Guayabo; her photographer and another man were also killed.
Arturo Marín Acevedo	MORENA	17 October	Aspirant for municipal president of Cuajinicuilapa, Guerrero	Shot in the town centre; his wife was wounded.
Gabriel Rivas Ríos	MORENA	4 November	Councillor of Cuernavaca, Morelos	Shot in the Acapantzingo neighbourhood by gunmen on a motorcycle; he had reported death threats. Federal authorities arrested a suspect on 12 November.

== See also ==
- Mexican drug war
- List of politicians killed in the Mexican drug war
- List of politicians killed during the presidency of Andrés Manuel López Obrador
