= Quechultenango (municipality) =

Municipality in the Mexican state of Guerrero

- Municipality
- Location in Mexico
- Coordinates: 17°24′53″N 99°14′28″W
- Country: Mexico
- State: Guerrero
- Municipal seat: Quechultenango

Area
  - Total: 929.7 km^{2} (359.0 sq mi)

Population (2005)
  - Total: 33,367

Quechultenango Caves, Guerrero

Quechultenango is a municipality in the Mexican state of Guerrero. The municipal seat lies at Quechultenango. The municipality covers an area of 929.7 km^{2}.

As of 2005, the municipality had a total population of 33,367.
