= Zitlala =

City in the Mexican state of Guerrero

- Municipal seat and city
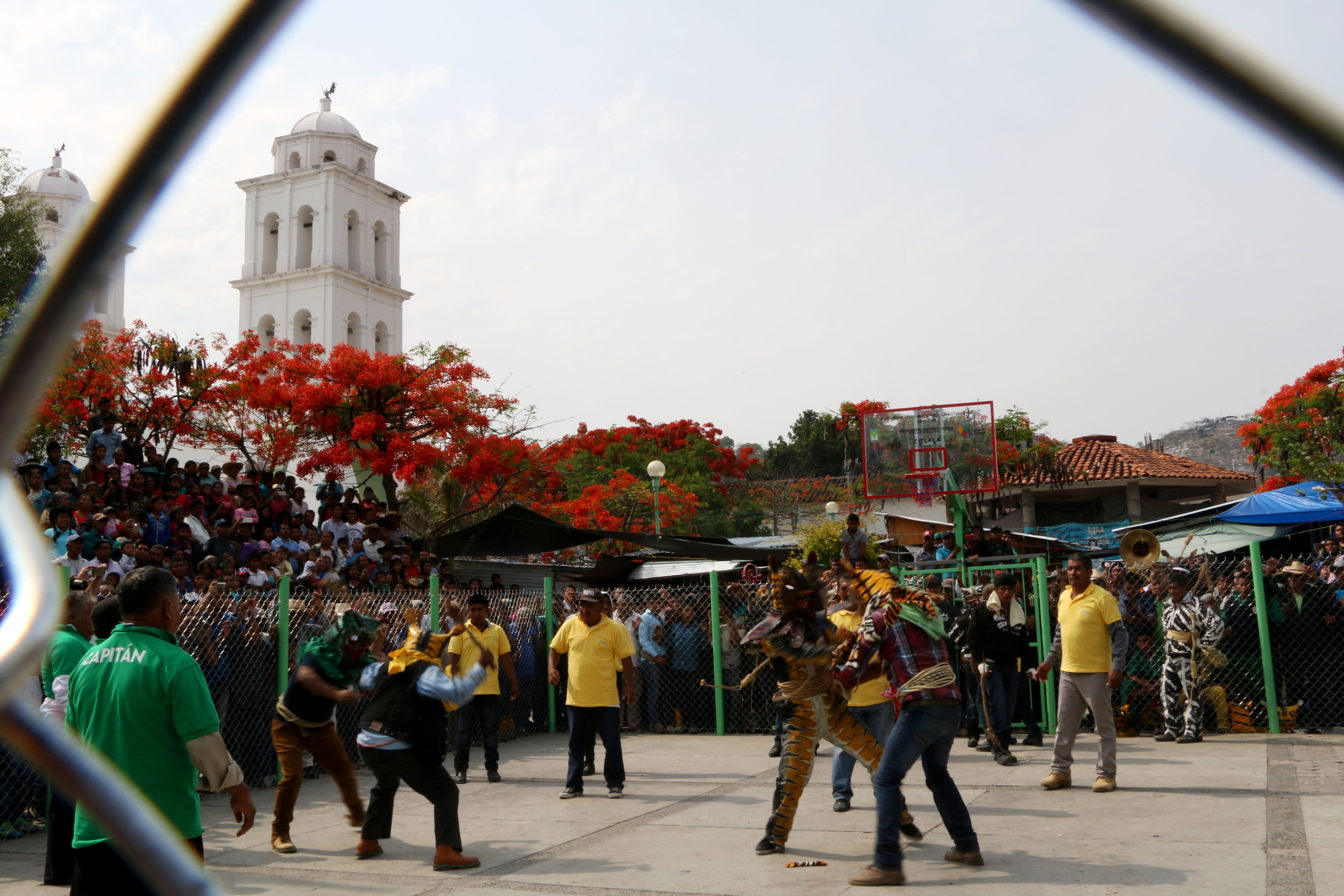

- Location within Guerrero Location within Mexico
- Coordinates: 17°38′N 99°5′W
- Country: Mexico
- State: Guerrero
- Municipality: Zitlala

Population (2005)
  - Ethnicities: Nahuas
  - Religions: Roman Catholic Church
- Time zone: UTC-6 (Zona Centro)
- Postal code: 41160

Zitlala is a city and seat of the municipality of Zitlala, in the Mexican state of Guerrero.
