= Cochoapa el Grande (municipality) =

Municipality in the Mexican state of Guerrero

- Municipality
- Location in Mexico
- Coordinates: 17°12′N 98°27′W
- Country: Mexico
- State: Guerrero
- Municipal seat: Cochoapa el Grande

Population (2005)
  - Total: 15,572

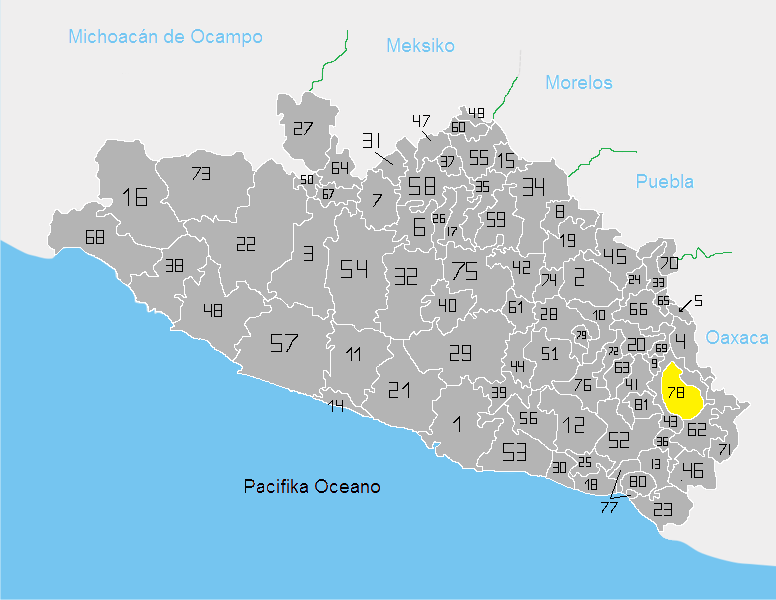
Map of Guerrero

Cochoapa el Grande is a municipality in the Mexican state of Guerrero. The municipal seat lies at Cochoapa el Grande. As of 2005, the municipality had a total population of 15,572. It is one of the newer municipalities of Guerrero, formed on June 13, 2003.
