= Cualac, Guerrero =

City in the Mexican state of Guerrero

Cualac
- Municipal seat
- Motto: lugar de agua dulce
- Location within Guerrero Location within Mexico
- Coordinates: 17°46′N 98°37′W
- Country: Mexico
- State: Guerrero
- Municipality: Cualac
- Time zone: UTC-6 (Central)

Cualac is a city and seat of the municipality of Cualac, in the state of Guerrero, southern Mexico. Cualac means Lugar de agua buena which translates into place of good water. According to the 2012 census its population was 7,007.
