= Copalillo (municipality) =

Municipality in the Mexican state of Guerrero

- Municipality
- Location in Mexico
- Coordinates: 17°05′N 98°52′W
- Country: Mexico
- State: Guerrero
- Municipal seat: Copalillo

Area
  - Total: 898.6 km^{2} (347.0 sq mi)

Population (2005)
  - Total: 13,747

Copalillo is a municipality in the Mexican state of Guerrero. The municipal seat lies at Copalillo. The municipality covers an area of 898.6 km^{2}.

As of 2005, the municipality had a total population of 13,747.
