= Atlixtac (municipality) =

Municipality in the Mexican state of Guerrero

- Municipality
- Location in Mexico
- Coordinates: 17°16′N 98°45′W
- Country: Mexico
- State: Guerrero
- Municipal seat: Atlixtac

Area
  - Total: 694 km^{2} (268 sq mi)

Population (2005)
  - Total: 23,371

Atlixtac is a municipality in the Mexican state of Guerrero. The municipal seat lies at Atlixtac. The municipality covers an area of 694 km^{2}.

In 2005, the municipality had a total population of 23,371.
