= Atenango del Río =

City in the Mexican state of Guerrero

- Municipal seat and city
- Location in Mexico Atenango del Río (Mexico)
- Coordinates: 18°5′N 99°6′W
- Country: Mexico
- State: Guerrero
- Municipality: Atenango del Río
- Time zone: UTC-6 (Zona Centro)

Atenango del Río is a city in the southern Mexican state of Guerrero. It serves as the seat of the surrounding municipality of Atenango del Río.

== Origin of the name Atenango ==
Some historians say the name derives from the Nahuatl Atenango, which translated into Spanish means "in the wall of water", but others argue it should be interpreted as "place of the dam or dike". The addition of the river was due to its location on the banks of the river Amacuzac.

Atenango municipality already existed when the state of Guerrero was created; it was originally part of the state of Mexico, which lost a part of its territory to form Guerrero.

== History ==
Prehispanic Background

As stated in the Codex Mendoza Atenango paid tribute to the Aztecs who had managed to dominate the region. The tribute was to give them corn, beans, chile, cotton blankets and carved stones for necklace, which they called "chalchihuitl" or green stone, commonly called jade.

Colonial history

In colonial times was present Atenango for being the setting in which Hernando Ruiz de Alarcon wrote a "Treatise on the orders of the Archbishop of Mexico, which narrates the customs that were the indigenous inhabitants of these lands."

The title of the treaty is "TREATY OF CUSTOMS AND RITES TODAY WE LIVE gentile inhabitants of this place," as well at that time were built three churches in the colonial style that exist in the municipality, being that of: Atenango River, Comala and Santiago Gómez-Zacango.

Nineteenth century

Atenango is present because of Generalissimo Don Jose Maria Morelos, having emerged from Uruapan to Tehuacán escorting the Congress came to Atenango Morelos, and wanted to cross the river requested information, did not receive one and the cross where Crey + or should be choked his soldiers and horses, annoyed ordered to burn the village, leaving only standing the house, kept going and Tesmalaca as it was called then Temalac, decided to rest his people.

Only the colonial army commanded by the top leaders who had come following in the steps, to arrive at Atenango Tulimán, villagers were told they were not far away, rushed his way and day 5 November 1815, having sent forward to Members and the file, Morelos was in the rear and was discovered when he was about to reach the summit of the hill of Tecaballo whose foot is Temalac.

The colonial soldiers led by a villager who was forced to teach a path come their way, Morelos tried to hide but was caught by Matthew Carranza who was a soldier who had fought under the command of Morelos and was now siding with their enemies .

Following his capture, Morelos was taken to Atenango, where on November 6, several captured soldiers taken prisoner alongside him were executed. Their remains are interred in the Monumento a los Héroes, where an annual commemoration is held on September 17.

Twentieth century

The beginnings of the revolution against Porfirio Díaz in Atenango had relevance for the following situation: Having invited many people to participate in the insurrection Mata Figueroa brothers, came and took the place of Atenango peacefully, on 26 February 1911.

In this place we read a proclamation that the teacher had written Francisco Mata Figueroa, in which unknown to Porfirio Díaz as president and also among other things asked for free elections.

To remember this historical event President Luis Echeverria Alvarez, visited the town on that date important to deliver deeds to the people made by the government of the Republic, counting among these the most important works, the bridge over the river to the neighboring municipalities Amacuzac of Copalillo and Olinalá and the states of Puebla and Morelos.

Between forty and fifty years the town lost territory to be annexed to Huitzuco communities: Tulimán, Paso Morelos, San Miguel de las Palmas, and Cahuilotla Chaucingo.

== Crest of Mexico ==
Shield

The shield represents the values of the municipality and its meaning is as follows: At the center presents the main economic activities of the municipality, agriculture and livestock, which are symbolized by the cornfield, the tlacolol and the bull, this is for the production .

Education is expressed in the sky pencils. With these images together represents the phrase written on water: EDUCATION AND PRODUCE IS PROGRESS. The organ and the hill of the peak gives an idea of warm weather and mountainous terrain of the region.

The rainy season is represented by the area plowed in green and the dry season in the yellow surface, and tlacolol as an antecedent of modern agriculture.

The river is horseshoe-shaped wall of water, also symbolized by the glyph of the place where formerly lived the indigenous population, tributary of the Aztecs to the Spanish arrived.

That place is now known as "La Hacienda" or "Atenango the old" as it is still called by the elders.

Fish and river ecological riches and itself a source of work for some families and in fishing or in the gardens of watermelon, with a resource that can get more out. The maguey that crowns the shield is a plant characteristic of the region.

Hidden on the banks of the river are two lizards, a species now extinct in the region, is remembered as a legend.

The blue water and sky symbolize the faith of the Atenenguenses in the future, the Christian cross on the peak symbolizes the faith they profess most of the inhabitants of the municipality.

It emphasizes that the name of Atenango is expressed in three ways: In a symbolic way in the horseshoe of water; the glyph that represents pre-Hispanic and Spanish. The glyph representing the name of Atenango in writing Picto Ideology of the Aztecs who dominated this region and were paid tribute to the people who dominated.

The fence behind the wall and see the stream of water splashing. The meaning is: ATL-CO: Water TENAMITL: Wall or fence, the union of the two words is: "In the wall of water".

== Geography ==
=== Climate ===
The type of climate is predominantly warm subhumid, with minimum temperatures of 22 °C and maximum 26 °C.

The rainfall covers the months of June, July, August and September, with average annual rainfall of 900 to 1.100 mm, the recorded wind direction is from east to west and from north to south in summer.

=== Major ecosystems ===
The predominant vegetation is tropical deciduous forest species that reach heights of 15 meters or a little longer to develop in warm humid climates, semi or subsecos, where most of the trees change leaves in dry season, the most common species are : Chupandia (Bursera), Lysiloma demostachys (Tepehuaje) Mexican jacarita (bonnet), impomea (poppy), Agave, Lemaireocereus, Opuntia and other cacti.

Among the tallest trees in the municipality there are vultures or caobilla, cacahuananche, tepemesquites, tlamiaguales, azúchiles, guamúchil and parotas; along the river bank are trees such as willows, junipers, figs, azúchiles, and atopules.

=== Natural resources ===
According to official figures confirmed, there are several untapped, such as gold, silver, copper, iron, lead, having also potters clay, bentonite, limestone in abundance, being worked in the bentonite high level during the fifties and sixties.

=== Characteristics and land use ===
The soils of the surface are layers that have their origin in the Mesozoic era and consist of sedimentary and igneous rocks exclusive for the periods of Cretaceous and Jurassic, highlighted by its characteristic pedological soil prairie steppe or prairie decalcification.

The various uses to give the land for crops and pastures are for livestock in different categories.

== Demography ==
=== Ethnic groups ===
According to the XII General Census of Population and Housing Census 2000 conducted by the National Institute of Statistics, Geography and Informatics (INEGI) the indigenous population of the town rise to 755 people, representing 8.87% from the total population of the municipality. Its main languages being Nahuatl and Tlapanec.

The only tribe that has the municipality is Temalac, but in every community there are Indian families who have come from other towns looking for better ways of life.

According to the results that I present the II Population and Housing in 2005, in the municipality live in a total of 571 people who speak an indigenous language.

=== Trends ===
According to XII conducted by the INEGI census the total population of the municipality in 2000 was 8.504 inhabitants, 4.046 men and 4.458 women, accounting for 47.2 percent and 52.8 percent respectively. The municipality's total population is 0.27% compared to the total state population.

The intercensal growth rate 1995-2000 is -0.23%. The population density in the municipality is 21.32 inhabitants per square kilometer.

Evolution of the Population in the City

=== Religion ===
In 2000, according to that Census conducted by the INEGI, the population 5 years and over who practice the Catholic religion amounts to 6.273 inhabitants, while the same age range are non-Catholic population 1.038 people.
