= Jacona, Michoacán =

Jacona de Plancarte
- City
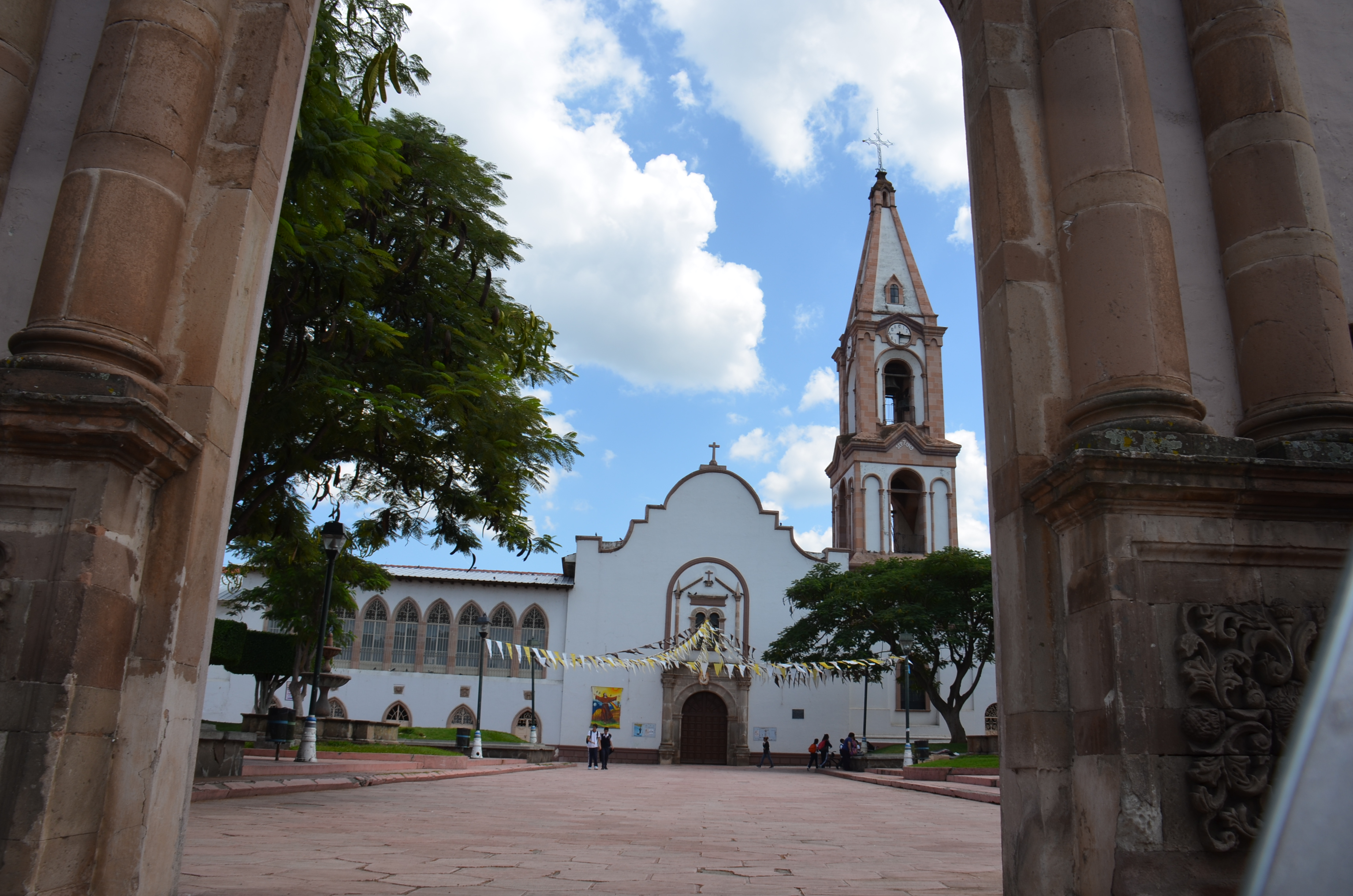

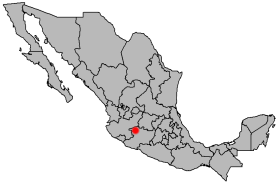
- Coordinates: 19°57′20″N 102°18′10″W
- Country: Mexico
- State: Michoacán
- Established: 1555

Population (2010)
  - Total: 53,860
- Time zone: UTC-6 (Central Standard Time)
- ZIP code: 59800
- Area code: Area code 351

Jacona de Plancarte (Jacona) is a city and the municipal seat of the Municipality of Jacona in the state of Michoacán, Mexico. Located in the northwest of the state, on the northern slope of the Sierra de Patamban, part of the Volcanic Belt, at 1,600 meters altitude. It was founded by Fray Sebastián de Trasierra in 1555, although they are located buildings and paintings of more than 3000 years old. Jacona was the symbolism of life and death, the symbol of humanity, and was one of the first pre-Hispanic peoples entrusted to the Spanish.

== Etymology ==
The name Jacona comes from Nahuatl, likely spoken by the Tecuexe and Coca Chichimecs native to the region. The original name was Xoconan, meaning "place of flowers and vegetables". The main hill in Jacona is called Curutaran, which is a Purepecha word formed by: "ku" together, "rhu" projection/tip, "tarha", play ball, and "an", gods, giving the meaning of "Place where the gods gather to play ball", referring to the Mesoamerican ballgame.

== Economy ==
=== Employment and wages ===
Jacona in 1990 recorded a population of 12 years and over by employment status by sex of her 27 000 076, 44.5% were employed, 0.7% were registered as unemployed, 50.4% were economically inactive population and the remaining 4.4% listed as unspecified. Note that economic activity and income depend on the 44.5% of the total population. Official figures indicate that the percentage of the unemployed population is small, however people representative of the municipality and municipal authorities consider that unemployment is a major economic problems of the municipality. The economically active population is overwhelmingly concentrated in people aged 15 to 44 years, the age group with the highest number is 15–19 years. In 1990 Jacona economic structure was the following: employment in the primary sector accounted for 38.2%, secondary industry 26.2%, the tertiary sector 31.1% and was recorded as unspecified 4, 5%. If we consider that in the town the population employed in primary and secondary sectors was higher than in the state and employed in the tertiary sector was less than the same, one can conclude that the relative economic backwardness of the area is greater than in the state.

=== Agriculture ===
According to the National Centre for Municipal Studies (ECMS), agriculture is the main economic activity taking place in the town, cultivated strawberry, corn, wheat, sorghum and vegetables, fruits and flowers. This ratify municipal authorities considering that agriculture is the main economic activity of the municipality. In 1990 Jacona had 4 ejidos and agrarian communities, which covered an area of 3 000 425 hectares, of which 1 000 were 556 parcels, and 1 000 869 parcels not, the working surface was of 987 ha, of which 115 were irrigation and 872 seasonal and irrigation. Only 4 units in technology employed work surface, 3 units with work surface used facilities; of the 4 units 1 used credit or insurance. In the 411 rural production units, with an area of 6 000 375 hectares, the land use is classified as follows: 307 ha are under agricultural use and forestry, irrigation 1 000 825, 982 in temporary grass 3 000 548 natural rangeland, forest or jungle, 20, 20 forest with natural grass rangeland and 1 without vegetation. Predominant use of natural pasture and rangeland. The land is classified as follows: 1 000 925 hectares are communal land and 4 000 450 are private. The use of technology as set out below: 35 units of rural production uses livestock and poultry facilities, units that use technology are 68 cattle, 15 pigs, 46 birds and 289 farm units, also used 263 animals shooting or tractors and 253 yoke, also in 235 units are used agricultural equipment and facilities and 2 are used forestry equipment and facilities. Of the 4 ejidos and agrarian communities in Jacona recorded in 1991, the 4 were principally engaged in agriculture. In 1991 the rural production units of the municipality amounted to 0.18% in relation to the state. Available 6 000 375 ha in total area 2 000 807 in labor, 3 000 548 in rangeland, 20 in forest or jungle and 1 without vegetation, it is clear the increased participation in rangeland area. In the 1996/1997 crop year in the municipality of Jacona total fertilized area was 3 000 223 ha, 3 000 198 were planted with improved seeds, 1 000 800 has benefited from technical assistance, 1 000 221 with plant health service and 1 000 341 has been machined. In 1996 the applicant producers in the municipality were 198, all of which were ratified and benefited. The amount paid for PROCAMPO was 250.8 thousand pesos.

=== Livestock ===
According to the ECMS, in the municipality are raised cattle, pigs, goats, sheep and horses, as well as birds and bees. In 1991 the rural production units and raising farm animals in relation to the state accounted for 0.13%, 0.06% in poultry, equines 0.17%, 0.08% and 0 cattle, 13% in pigs. In absolute numbers of production units were 203, 64 in poultry, 174 equines, 69 cattle and 16 goats. The livestock population of the town was as follows: 28 000 poultry, 3 000 521 2 000 564 cattle and pigs. As shown the population of poultry and cattle is the most important in the municipality. Livestock production in her municipality according to its value, this activity is small when compared with the state, because it represents less than 1%, however, within the municipal livestock production include the bovine and porcine, with 74.5% and 14.9% respectively. In Jacona the number of sacrifices was as follows: 28 000 birds, 461 cattle, 510 goats and far below is followed by sheep and pigs. The production of beef carcasses in the town was about: 38.7 tons of poultry, 20.3 and 74.3 tons of pork and veal, lacking the rest of importance. Depending on the value of production, the most important species in the municipality were the herds with 304 thousand dollars, the veal with 1 million 225 thousand and 697 thousand dollars in birds, the rest are recorded very low figures. Within the volume of production of other livestock products are considered the cow and goat milk, skins, wool, eggs, honey and beeswax. The municipality said the milk production of cattle with 587 thousand liters and honey production was 26.4 t, there was no egg production and the wax and wool are negligible.

=== Forestry ===
Official figures indicate that the municipality did not register forestry production.

=== Industry ===
According to the ECMS, the municipality has 15 plants freezing and packing of fruit, mainly strawberries. 2 soft drink bottlers, and a power generating plant of the CFE, located in the tenure of the Pantanal. Agribusiness is considered by municipal authorities as one of the main activities of the municipality. In 1994 the main features of the manufacturing establishments were: 435 affordable units were surveyed, the average total employed persons was 7 000 952, the total compensation to persons employed were 89 thousand 787 thousand pesos, net fixed assets totaled the amount of 104 thousand 597.1 thousand pesos, gross fixed capital was 23 thousand 016 thousand pesos, the total gross output reached 316 000 382.0 thousand pesos, total inputs reached 195 000 573, 9 thousand dollars and the value added was 808.1 thousand 120 thousand pesos. Taking as criteria the number of affordable units, the average total employed persons, the total remuneration to employed persons and the total gross output, major sub-sectors were food products, beverages and snuff, wood industry and wood products ( including furniture), and chemicals, petroleum products and coal, rubber and plastic. In turn, within the subsector Food, beverages and snuff; include canning food (including concentrates for soups and excludes meat and milk only to the beverage.) As regards the sub-industry of wood and wood products (including furniture), highlight the manufacturing sawmill and woodworking products (excluding furniture), and the manufacturing of packaging and other wood and cork products (excluding furniture). As for the subsector Chemicals, petroleum products and coal, rubber and plastic products is the production of basic chemicals (excluding basic petrochemicals).

=== Trade ===
According to the ECMS, Jacona municipality has a mall, clothing stores, furniture, shoes, food, hardware, construction materials, stationery, grocery stores, pharmacies, among others. According to municipal authorities and people representing the company, believe that trade is one of the main activities of the municipality. It also has a municipal public market and a flea market, several grocery stores. Is under construction supply market to the east of the city. According to statistics, in 1996 there were in Jacona 2 flea markets, public market and 1 1 trace machining. Because the overall rate of consumer price exists only for the country and major cities, we reproduce here the data at the national level and to Morelia, hoping to serve as baseline information, it is likely that the rate of rock around town Data presented here. In 1997 the annual percentage change in price index in January was 26.44 and 15.72 in December, in Morelia in January was 25.08 and 15.18 in December. As regards inflation rate and, for lack of data regarding the town, offered as a reference to national data and Morelia. At the national level was 24.74 cumulative inflation from January to December 1996, i.e. the sum of monthly percentage changes, the cumulative 8.38 from January to July 1997, i.e. the sum of the percentage changes 19.70 monthly and annualized to July 1997, i.e. the percentage change compared to the same month last year. In the city of Morelia was 23.56, 8.32 and 18.30, respectively. It is estimated that the inflation rate in the municipality oscillate around the data presented here.

== Culture ==
=== Historical monuments ===
The Church and Convent of San Martin and the Church of St. Augustine, for its architectural value, the area in a place known as "Old Town", where there are paintings of archaeological importance, and City Hall.

=== Tourism ===
Jacona has many parks, churches, monuments and historic center.

=== Spas ===
• Balneario El Pedregal (3.5 km from Jacona) • Jacona Spa (3.5 km from Jacona) • Country resort (1 km of Jacona) • The Samanos spa (center Jacona) • Paradise spa (center Jacona)

=== Lakes ===
• Lake orandino • Lake of stay • Curutarán lake (dam of greenish)

=== Events ===
February 14, the anniversary of the coronation of the Virgen de La Esperanza (1886), 15 February, beginning of the Strawberry Fair, September 8, Nativity of Our Lady of La Esperanza, and 5 November anniversary of the founding of Jacona, which give rise to thousands and thousands of visitors from many parts of the republic, as these parties are the most popular of Michoacan.

== Births ==
Sports

- Armando Navarrete, Football goalkeeper.
