= Mártir de Cuilapán =

Municipality in the Mexican state of Guerrero

- Municipality
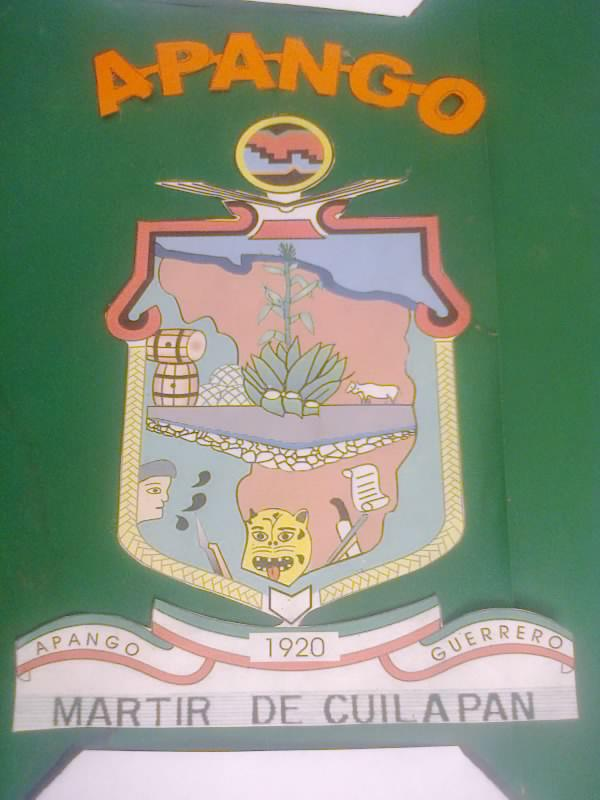
- Coat of arms

- Location in Mexico
- Coordinates: 18°30′N 99°30′W
- Country: Mexico
- State: Guerrero
- Municipal seat: Apango

Population (2005)
  - Total: 15,272

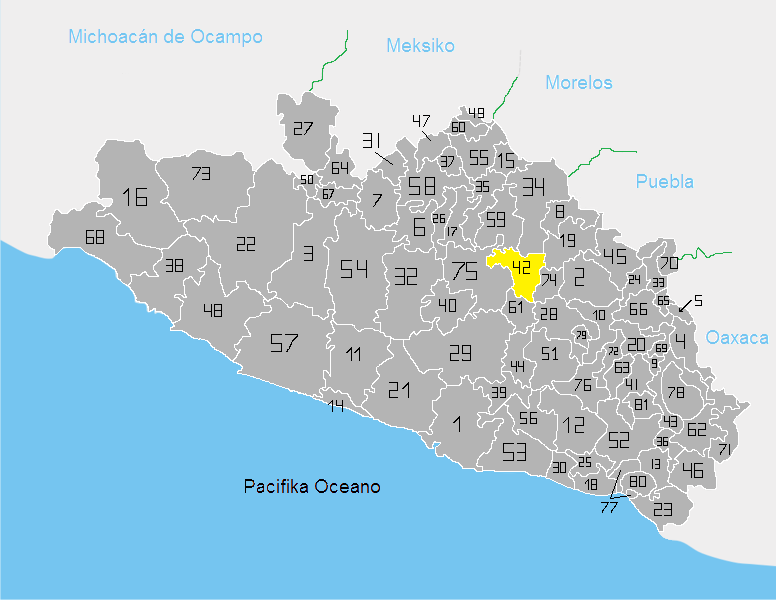

Mártir de Cuilapán is a municipality in the Mexican state of Guerrero. The municipal seat lies at Apango. The municipality covers an area of 499.8 km^{2}.

Before the Spanish conquistadors arrived, the area was known as Coixcas.

As of 2005, the municipality had a total population of 15,272.
