= Cualac (municipality) =

Municipality in the Mexican state of Guerrero

- Municipality
- Location in Mexico
- Coordinates: 17°46′N 98°37′W
- Country: Mexico
- State: Guerrero
- Municipal seat: Cualac

Area
  - Total: 196.8 km^{2} (76.0 sq mi)

Population (2005)
  - Total: 6,816

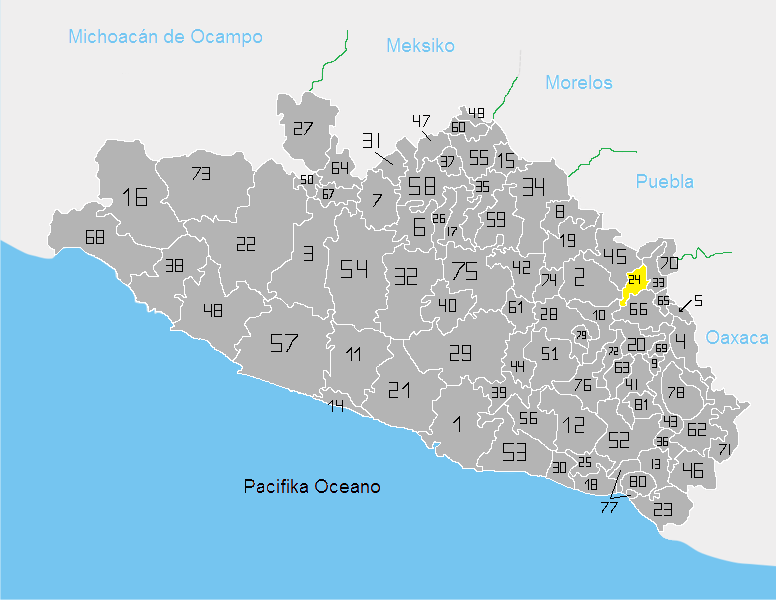
Esperanto Guerrero

Cualac is a municipality in the Mexican state of Guerrero. The municipal seat lies at Cualac. The municipality covers an area of 196.8 km^{2}.

As of 2005, the municipality had a total population of 6,816.
