= Atenango del Río (municipality) =

Municipality in the Mexican state of Guerrero

- Municipality
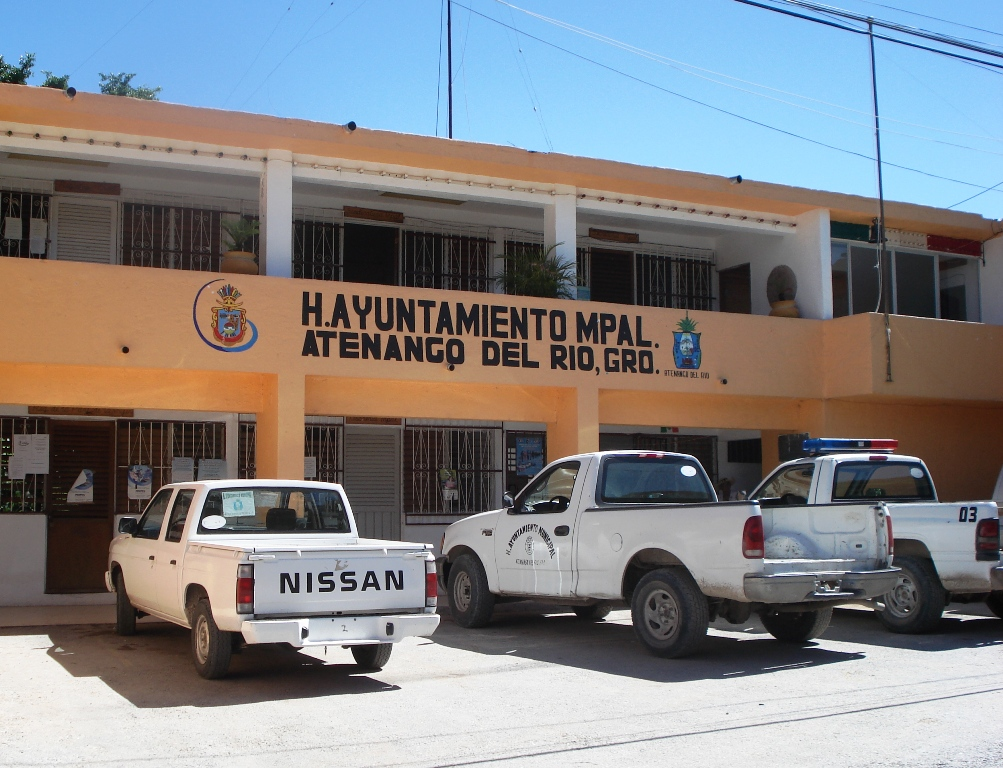

- Coat of arms

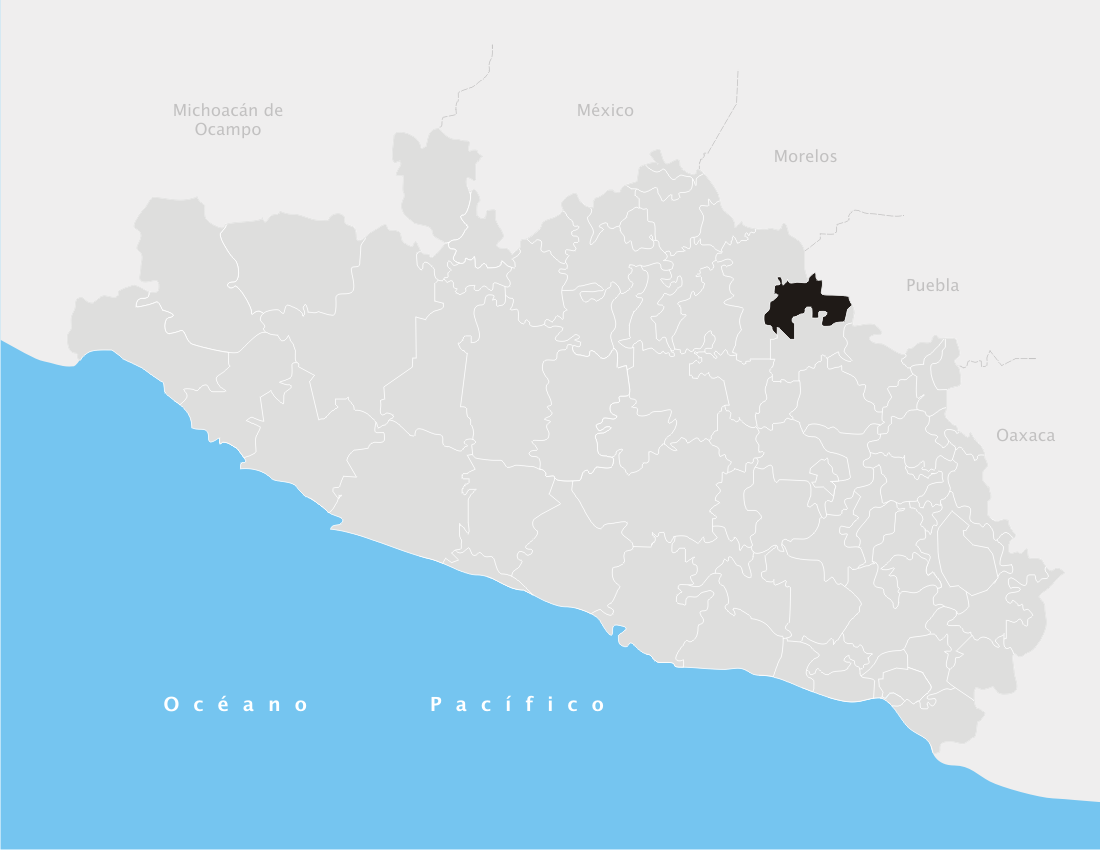
- Municipality of Atenango del Río in Guerrero

- Location in Mexico
- Coordinates: 17°58′N 98°56′W
- Country: Mexico
- State: Guerrero
- Municipal seat: Atenango del Río

Area
  - Total: 398.8 km^{2} (154.0 sq mi)

Population (2005)
  - Total: 7,648

Atenango del Río is a municipality in the Mexican state of Guerrero. The municipal seat lies at Atenango del Río. The municipality covers an area of 398.8 km^{2}.

As of 2005, the municipality had a total population of 7,648.

== Municipal presidents ==
Presidente municipal	Periodo
Onésimo Ramírez Torres	1969-1971
Braulio Figueroa Gaytán	1972-1974
Margarita Marbán Sánchez	1975-1977
Hermila Sánchez de Marbán	1978-1980
Luis Sánchez Soriano	1981-1983
Mardonio Torres Flores	1983-1986
Luis Sánchez Soriano	1986-1989
Lucas Ramírez Celso	1989-1993
Enrique Marbán Sánchez	1993-1996
Edmundo Jaime Marbán Quiroz	1996-1999
Diego Nieves Soriano	1999-2002
Marco Antonio Espinobarros Abarca	2002-2005
Nicolás Domínguez Ariza	2005-2008
