= Zitlala (municipality) =

Municipality in the Mexican state of Guerrero

- Municipality
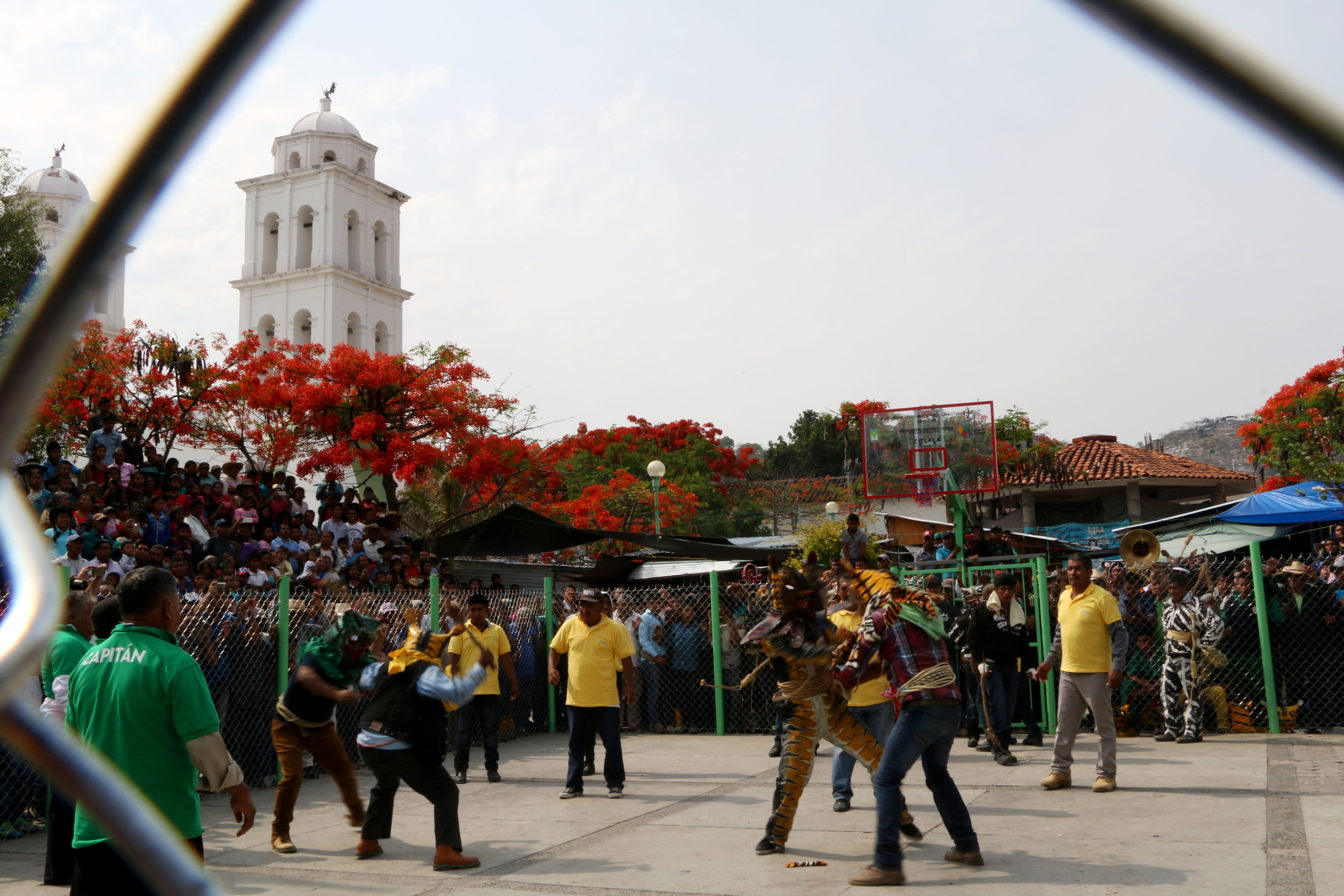

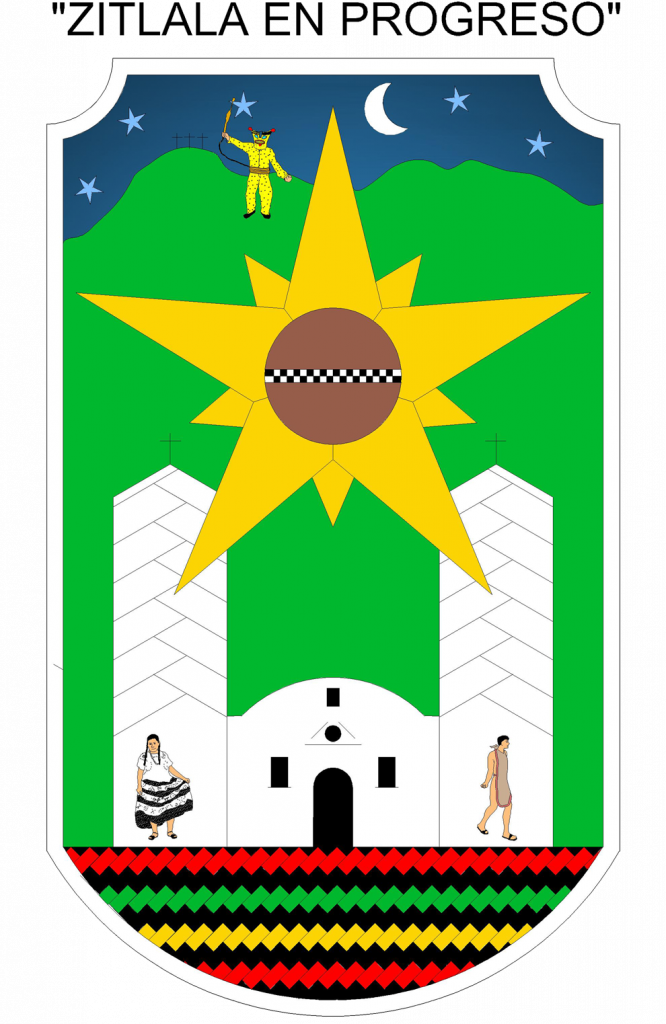
- Coat of arms

- Location in Mexico
- Coordinates: 17°41′N 99°12′W
- Country: Mexico
- State: Guerrero
- Municipal seat: Zitlala

Area
  - Total: 308.2 km^{2} (119.0 sq mi)

Population (2005)
  - Total: 19,718
- Time zone: UTC– 06:00 (CTZ)
- Postal code: 41160

Zitlala is a municipality in the Mexican state of Guerrero. The municipal seat lies at Zitlala. The municipality covers an area of 308.2 km^{2}.

In 2005, the municipality had a total population of 19,718.

The municipality has been impacted by violence.
