= Chilapa de Álvarez =

Town in the Mexican state of Guerrero

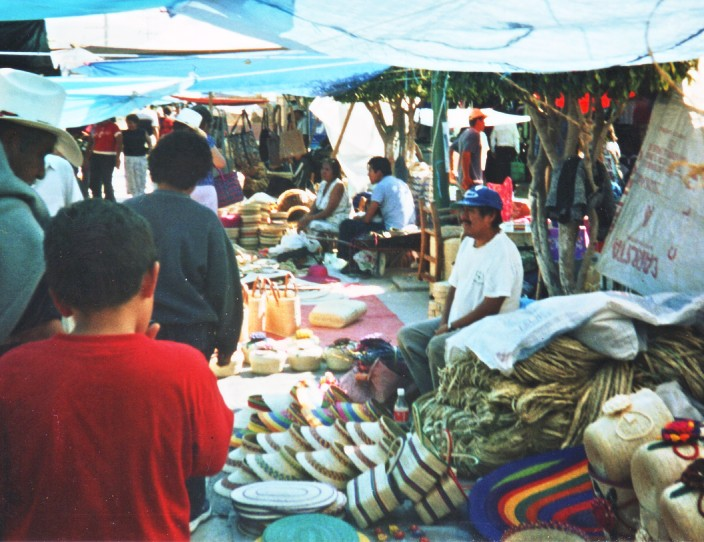
- Vendors selling woven goods in the tianguis of Chilapa

- Location within Guerrero Location within Mexico
- Coordinates: 17°35′40″N 99°10′40″W
- Country: Mexico
- State: Guerrero
- Municipality: Chilapa de Álvarez

Population (2010)
  - Total: 120,790
  - Ethnicities: Nahuas; Mestizos
  - Religions: Roman Catholic Church
- Time zone: UTC-6 (Zona Centro)

Chilapa de Álvarez, informally known as Chilapa, is a town located in the municipality of Chilapa de Álvarez in the Mexican state of Guerrero. The town is located approximately 54 kilometers east of the state capital Chilpancingo.

Chilapa is noted for its large Saturday tianguis, or Aztec market, and its crafts. Local culinary specialities of Chilapa include pozole, chalupas, pan de chilapa bread, and homemade mezcal. The municipal cathedral has a mechanical figurine of Juan Diego, who appears at a window in the cathedral spire and drops rose petals onto the plaza below.

Every August 15, a festival called Tigrada is held on the streets of Chilapa. It is linked to Mesoamerican mythology and is supposed to call on the Aztec god Tepēyōllōtl to bring rainfall and productive land.

== History ==
Traces of human occupation in the area date to 1200 BC. Chilapa's first official charter was issued by the Aztec government in the 15th century after the area's conquest by Moctezuma I in 1458. Prehispanic Chilapan was a Coixca community and exported foodstuffs, honey and petates to towns on the Pacific coast in exchange for salt and cacao.

The Spanish officially designated the town Chilapa de Santa Maria de Asuncion in 1522; in the late 19th century it was renamed Chilapa de Álvarez in honor of Mexican president Juan Álvarez.
