= Chilapa de Álvarez (municipality) =

Municipality in the Mexican state of Guerrero

- Municipality
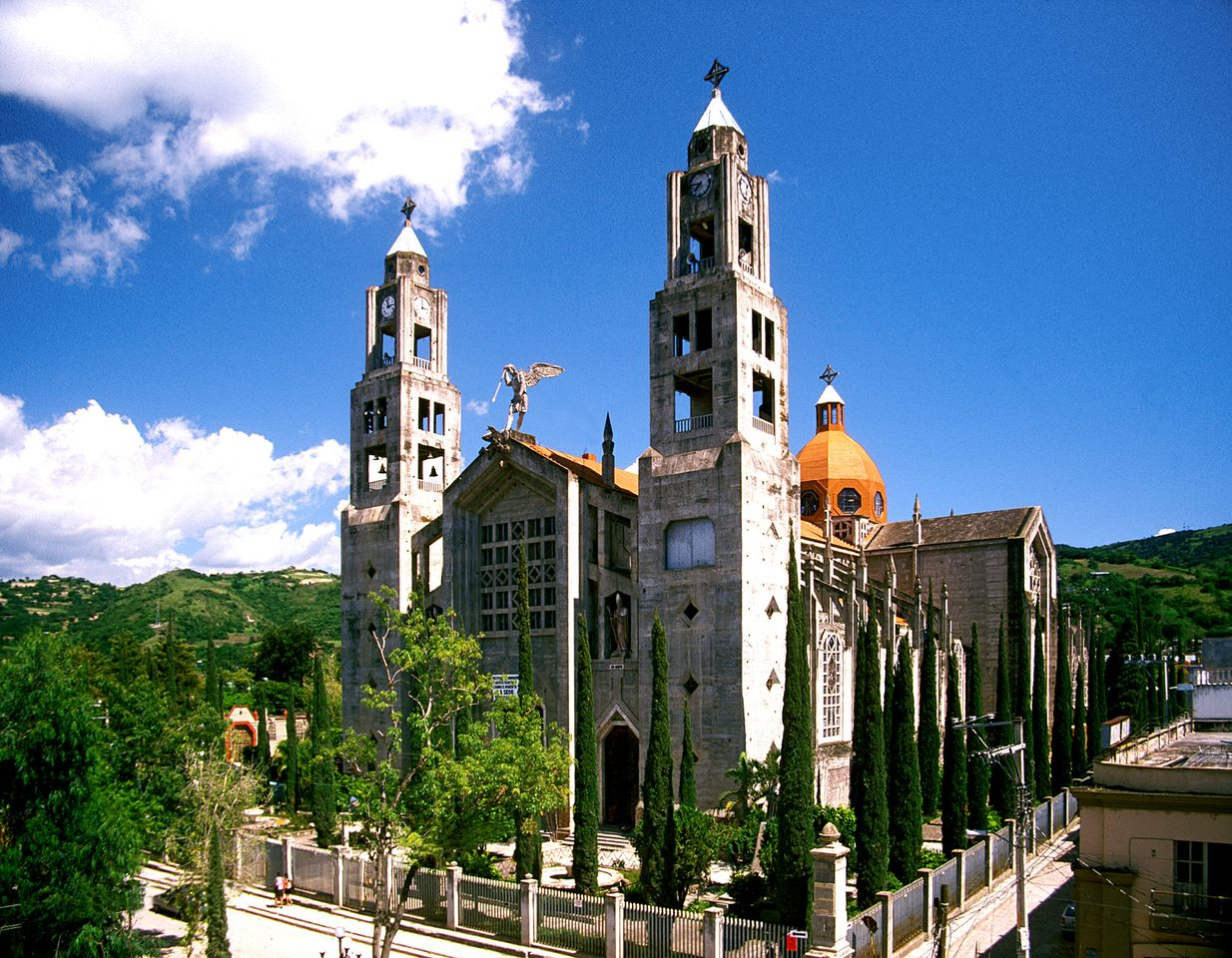

- Coat of arms

- Location in Mexico
- Coordinates: 17°19′N 98°58′W
- Country: Mexico
- State: Guerrero
- Municipal seat: Chilapa de Álvarez

Area
  - Total: 566.8 km^{2} (218.8 sq mi)

Population (2005)
  - Total: 105,146

Chilapa de Álvarez is a municipality in the Mexican state of Guerrero. The municipal seat lies at Chilapa de Álvarez. The municipality covers an area of 566.8 km^{2}.

The municipality has been heavily impacted by violence, and its municipal seat has been called "one of the deadliest towns" in Guerrero.

== Demographics ==
As of 2005, the municipality had a total population of 105,146.

The 2000 census counted 102,853 persons in the municipality.

== Towns and villages ==
- Chilapa de Álvarez
- Alcozacán
- Zelocotitlán
