= Bartolomé de Alva =

Don Bartolomé de Alva was a Novohispanic mestizo secular priest and Nahuatl translator.

== Family ==
Alva was one of the youngest children born to indigenous Doña Ana Cortés Ixtlixochitl and her husband, a Spaniard, Juan Pérez de Peralta. Alva may have been the youngest, or he may have had a younger sister, but records are unclear. He was born around 1597, which appears to be around the time his mother became the cacique of Teotihuacan.

Alva was a younger brother of the chronicler don Fernando de Alva Ixtlilxochitl, one of the most cited and studied Amerindian, or mestizo, chroniclers from colonial New Spain. Bartolomé's brother Fernando occupied positions of authority within New Spain's colonial government that had previously been reserved only for indigenous elites, not Spaniards or mestizos, including serving as the governing judge (juez gobernador) of Texcoco and Chalco and as the cacique of Teotihuacan alongside the oldest Alva Ixtlixochitl brother after the death of their mother, Doña Ana Cortés, in 1640.

== Education and Priesthood ==
Alva received a bachelor's degree from the University of Mexico in 1622, and subsequently a licentiate. Alva was ordained as a Catholic priest when it was rare for people of mixed-ethnic heritage to be ordained. Spanish canon law prevented people who were not pure-blooded Spaniards from being ordained, but there is evidence that these rules were "selectively ignored" by the 1630s.

After his ordination, Alva participated in the exams that the Church required to determine the placement of priests in clerical positions. The tribunal administrator who considered his placement was aware of his Texcocan heritage and of his exam results, wrote “that he was extremely competent in Nahuatl” despite “his preparation in moral theology and the administration of the sacraments…[being] only moderate.” He was placed in a secular role in Zumpahuacan in 1627 and later moved to Chiapa de Mota for clerical service in 1631.

== Works ==
=== Confessionary ===
In 1634 Alva wrote and published a Nahuatl-language confessionary, Confessionario Mayor, y Menor en Lengva Mexicana (A Guide to Confession Large and Small in the Mexican Language), for the use of priests administering confession to Nahuas. This book is a script to the Catholic Sacrament of Confession between a Nahua confessant, the person who seeks forgiveness by confessing their sins, and a Spanish-speaking confessor, the priest who hears the Confession. The Confessionario is written as a parallel conversation in both Spanish and Nahuatl within which Alva condenses teachings of the Catholic Church into the lines of the priest, and the sins of the Native person into the scripted responses of the Nahua participant.

=== Three Spanish Plays in Translation ===
Between 1640 and 1641 Alva translated three Spanish plays into Nahuatl. He translated plays that span different eras of the Spanish Golden Age:

1. Lope de Vega's “La madre de la major” (“The Mother of the Best”), probably composed circa 1610-1612.Alva dedicated this translation to Horacio Carochi, one of his intellectual peers.
2. “El animal profeta y dichoso patricida” (“The Animal Prophet and the Fortunate Patricide”), written circa 1613-1630, which Alva attributes to Lope de Vega, but that other historians have speculated was written by one of de Vega's students, Antonio Mira de Amescua.
3. Pedro Calderón de la Barca's “El gran teatro del mundo” (“The Great Theater of the World”) with an entremés, circa 1635. Alva translated of “El gran teatro del mundo” using a Spanish manuscript of the play that is no longer in existence. The “original” Spanish version that remains is a transcription from its performance in Valencia in 1641, though the play was likely debuted in the late 1630s. "Between the play's debut and its first recorded performance in Valencia, a manuscript copy traveled across the Atlantic and reached the Jesuit mission at Tepozotlan” where Alva likely found it to translate.

The manuscripts of these translations contain marginal notes referencing Carochi.

=== Contributions to Horaicio Carochi's works ===
Alva's work contributed to Horacio Carochi's grammar of Nahuatl, Arte de la lengua mexicana, published in 1645. Alva was an examiner who wrote one of the letters of Inquisitional approval that was needed for the book to be published. In his approval Alva writes that "the author, by dint of study, has attained the ability to explain masterfully in the Mexican [i.e. Nahuatl] and Otomi languages what the very natives, although they reach an understanding of it, hardly manage to express."

Carochi heavily references Alvas works as examples of Nahuatl in his grammar. Some scholars speculate that the purpose of Alva's theater translations could have been to use as examples of a wide range of Nahuatl-language uses that Carochi could apply to his linguistic studies, as opposed to being translated to be performed. Alva's translation of "The Animal Prophet and the Fortunate Patricide," the Florentine Codex and the Bancroft Dialogues are the three most-cited known sources of examples of Nahuatl that Carochi highlights.

Carochi's manuscripts of the Arte also reference a “don Fernando,” who is assumed to be Alva's brother, Alva Ixtlilxochitl.

== Legacy ==
=== Identity ===
In the introduction to the published book of Alva's translated plays, one scholar refers to Alva as a “person of color” who is exceptional in his rarity; this term is not one that was used or claimed in Alva's time. Other scholars emphasize his “identity” as a mestizo and the syncretism that he himself embodied and carried into his work.

Little is known about how Alva or his full-blooded brother Alva Ixtlilxochitl identified themselves using the terms for their time and place.

=== Influence ===
Alva's translations “were once characterized by the great dean of Nahuatl studies, Ángel María Garibay K., as the ‘broken flight’ (el vuelo roto), insofar as they constituted a theme in Nahuatl” of recreating Spanish literature in this native language that was not continued.

Carochi's grammar and dictionary, to which Alva fundamentally contributed, is regarded as "the most influential work ever published on Nahuatl grammar" to this day. This text was one of the first times that "knowledge about vowel quality and glottal stop in Nahuatl" was recorded in a European language. Some still consider it "an indispensable pedagogical tool" for academics learning Nahuatl today.
