= Arte de la lengua mexicana =

Arte de la lengua mexicana is the title or part of the title of several grammars of Nahuatl:

- Arte de la lengua mexicana y castellana (1571 book) by Alonso de Molina
- Arte de la lengua mexicana con la declaración de los adverbios della (1645 book) by Horacio Carochi
- Arte de la lengua mexicana (1673 book) by Augustín de Vetancurt
- Arte de la lengua mexicana (1689 book) by Antonio Vázquez Gaztelu
- Arte de la lengua mexicana según la acostumbran hablar los Indios en todo el obsipado de Guadalajara, parte del de Guadiana y del de Mechoacan (1692 book) by Juan Guerra
- Arte de la lengua mexicana (1717 book) by Francisco de Avila
- Arte de la lengua mexicana (1754 book) by Joseph Augustin de Aldama y Guevara
- Arte de la lengua mexicana (1810 book) by Rafael Tiburcio Sandoval

== See also ==
- Arte para aprender la lengua mexicana (1547 book) by Andrés de Olmos
- Arte mexicana (1595 book) by Antonio del Rincón
- Arte mexicano (1642 book) by Diego de Galdo Guzmán
- Arte de el idioma mexicano (1713 book) by Manuel Pérez
- Arte novíssima de lengua mexicana (1753 book) by Carlos de Tapia Centeno
- Arte, vocabulario, y confesionario en el idioma mexicano, como se usa en el obispado de Guadalaxara (1765 book) by Geronymo Thomas de Aquino Cortés y Zedeño
