= Arte de la lengua mexicana (1754 book) =

Nahuatl grammar manual

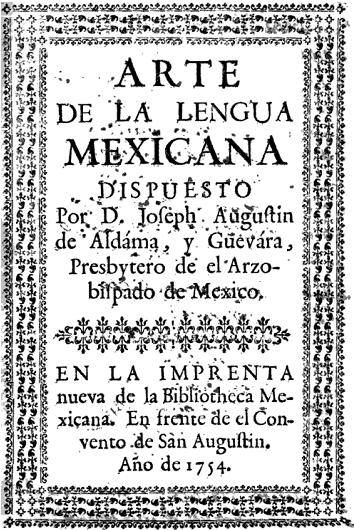
- Author: Joseph Augustin Aldama y Guevara
- Language: Spanish
- Subject: Nahuatl language
- Genre: Grammar
- Publisher: Bibliotheca Mexicana
- Publication date: 1754
- Publication place: Mexico
- Pages: 163

Arte de la lengua mexicana is a little-known grammar of the Nahuatl language by Joseph Augustin Aldama y Guevara published in 1754.

== Sources used ==
Aldama y Guevara's Arte is mostly derivative of previously published grammars of Nahuatl, particularly Horacio Carochi's Arte de la lengua mexicana con la declaracion de los adverbios della.

== Markings ==
Aldama y Guevara marks the saltillo with a circumflex accent over the preceding vowel at the end of a word, or a grave accent over the preceding vowel elsewhere, and marks long vowels with an acute accent (in contrast to Carochi's macron).
