= Antonio del Rincón =

- Born: 1566
- Died: 2 March 1601 (aged 34–35)

Antonio del Rincón (1566 – March 2, 1601) was a Jesuit priest and grammarian, who wrote one of the earliest grammars of the Nahuatl language (known generally as the Arte mexicana, MS. published in 1595).

A native of Texcoco from the early decades of the Viceroyalty of New Spain and descendant of the tlatoque (ruling nobility of Texcoco), del Rincón was a native speaker of the indigenous language. Historians debate whether both his parents were indigenous Nahuas or whether he was a mestizo of half-Nahua, half-Spanish parentage. Historian Kelly McDonough considers him one of the first Nahua intellectuals. Guzman Betancourt calls him "the first native linguist of the New World". He entered the Company of Jesus at the age of 17 and quickly became known for his good grasp of the Nahuatl language and his sound theology.

His grammar ranks alongside those of Andrés de Olmos and Alonso de Molina as an influential primary source for the language as spoken in the post-conquest period. He was the first scholar to hear and mark the glottal stop and vowel length distinction in nahuatl, and he was an important influence on his later Jesuit colleague Horacio Carochi, who elaborated on Rincón's work in his own famous arte. Nahuatl grammarians have praised Rincón for being the first to analyze the Nahuatl language on its own terms, instead of building on the latinate molds of European grammars. Linguist Una Canger has written that "When Carochi praises Rincón and underlines how he teaches with "such mastery", it is because of the organization of the Arte and because Rincón analyzes the language not according to the Latin model, but on its own terms. What Carochi adopted from Rincón is exactly the organization of the Arte.
