= Arte de la lengua mexicana con la declaración de los adverbios della =

Nahuatl grammar book

Arte de la lengva mexicana con la declaracion de los adverbios della. Al Illustrisso. y Reuerendisso.
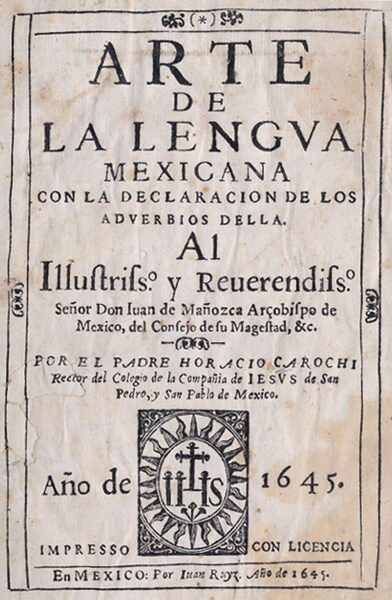
- Author: Horacio Carochi
- Language: Spanish
- Subject: Nahuatl language
- Publisher: Juan Ruyz
- Publication date: 1645
- Publication place: Mexico

The Arte de la lengua mexicana con la declaración de los adverbios della is a 1645 grammar of the Nahuatl language in Spanish by Jesuit grammarian Horacio Carochi. This classic work on the Classical Nahuatl language is now considered by linguists to be the finest and most useful of the many extant early grammars of Nahuatl.

== Innovation and 1759 reprint ==
Carochi had an acute understanding of the Nahuatl language and was the first grammarian to understand and propose a consistent transcription of several phenomena in Nahuatl phonology, especially vowel length and the saltillo (glottal stop). His art was seen as important soon after its elaboration and already in 1759 a version called "compendio del arte ..." re-edited by Fray Ignacio Paredes was prepared and reprinted. This version which has been reprinted many times since, however, lacks most of the virtues of the original work.

== 2001 version ==
In 2001 it was published as "Grammar of the Mexican language: with an explanation of its adverbs" in an edition where the Spanish paleographic version appears side-by-side with an English translation by James Lockhart.

== Derivative work ==
The 1754 Nahuatl grammar Arte de la lengua mexicana is considered particularly derivative of Carochi's work.
