= Juan Bautista Pomar =

Juan Bautista (de) Pomar (c. 1535 – after 1601) was a mestizo descendant of the rulers of prehispanic Texcoco, a historian and writer on prehispanic Aztec history. He is the author of two major works. His Relación de Texcoco was written in response to the Relación geográfica ca.1580.

According to references by Fray Juan de Torquemada, he was born around 1535 at Texcoco. He was the great grandson of Nezahualcoyotl, and was of mixed indigenous and Spanish heritage on his father's side. Considered noble by the Spaniards, he was able to obtain one of his great-grandfather's royal houses, known as the Nezahualcoyotl, in Texcoco.

Pomar was raised as a Christian but learned Aztec tradition from his mother. He was bilingual and spoke and wrote in both Spanish and the native language of the Aztecs, Nahuatl. He is credited with one of the most important compilations of Nahuatl poetry, Romances de los señores de Nueva España.

Pomar's major work includes an account of the Aztecs and Tlatelolcas Relación de Juan Bautista Pomar completed in 1582. He interviewed aged Nahuas, who recounted memory of the older and lost customs of their people. His account, written at the suggestion of the protomedic of Philip II of Spain, complements with the works of Bernardino de Sahagún and Fernando Alva Ixtlilxochitl.

== Bibliography ==
- Carrera Stampa, Manuel (1971). "Historiadores indígenas y mestizos novohispanos. Siglos XVI y XVII". Revista Española de Antropología Americana (in Spanish). Madrid.
