= Arte para aprender la lengua mexicana =

1547 grammar of Nahuatl by Andrés de Olmos

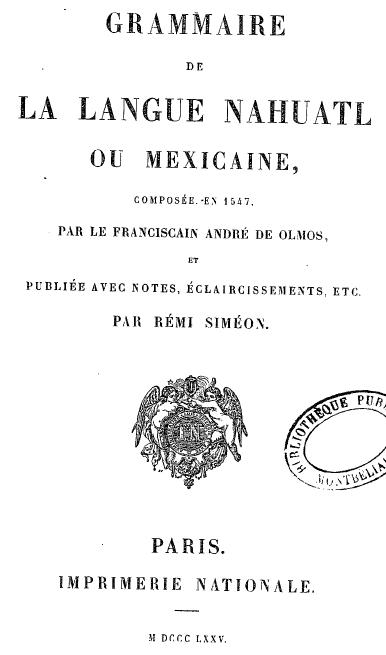
- Siméon's 1875 edition.
- Author: Andrés de Olmos
- Language: Spanish
- Subject: Nahuatl language
- Genre: Grammar
- Publisher: Imprimerie Nationale
- Publication date: 1875
- Publication place: Mexico/France

The Arte para aprender la lengua mexicana is a grammar of the Nahuatl language in Spanish by Andrés de Olmos. It was written in Mexico in 1547, but remained in manuscript form until 1875, when it was published in Paris by Rémi Siméon under the title Grammaire de la langue nahuatl ou mexicaine. Olmos' Arte is the earliest known Nahuatl grammar.

As with usual Nahuatl orthography, Olmos did not write glottal stops (saltillos), or distinguish vowel length. He was, however, almost unique in distinguishing the voiced and voiceless allophones of /l/, writing [ɬ] as lh.
