= Vocabulario trilingüe =

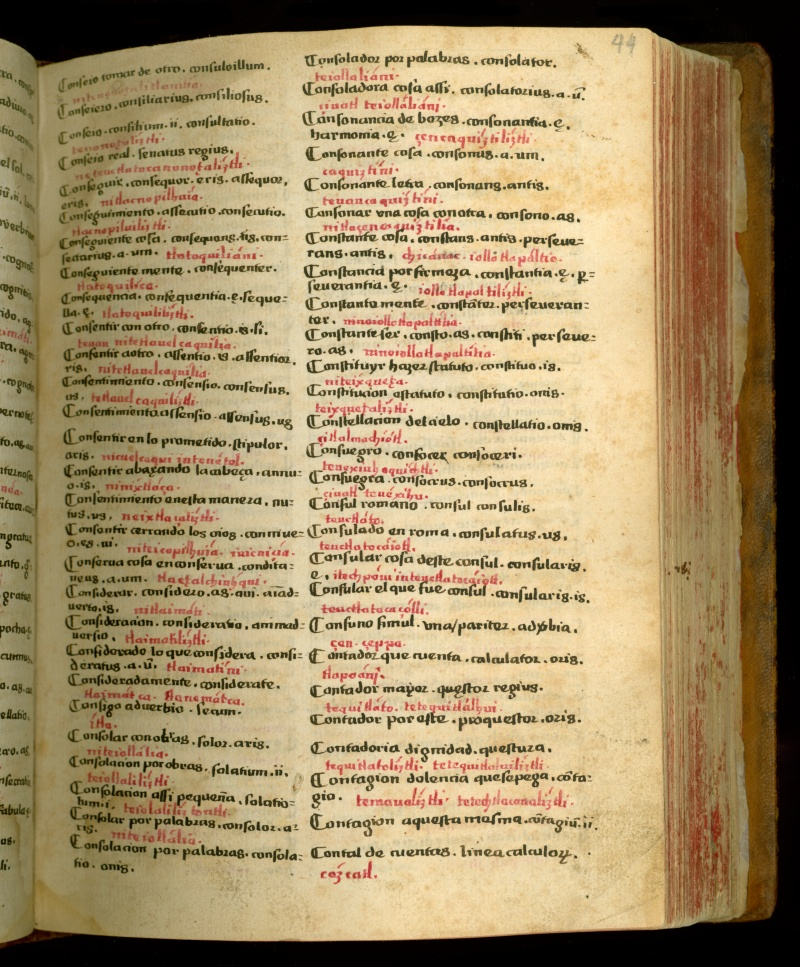
A page of the Vocabulario trilingüe.

The Vocabulario trilingüe (Spanish pronunciation: [bokaβuˈlaɾjo tɾiˈliŋɡwe]; Spanish for "trilingual vocabulary"; Ayer MS 1478) is an anonymous 16th-century manuscript copy of the second edition (1516) of Antonio de Nebrija's Spanish-Latin dictionary, which has been expanded by the addition of Nahuatl translations of its entries in red ink. The manuscript is currently held by the Newberry Library in Chicago, Illinois, United States.
