= Romances de los señores de Nueva España =

The Romances de los señores de Nueva España (Spanish for "Ballads of the Lords of New Spain") is a 16th-century compilation of Nahuatl songs or poems preserved in the Benson Latin American Collection at the University of Texas. The manuscript also includes a Spanish-language text, the Geographical Relation of Tezcoco, written in 1582 by Juan Bautista Pomar, who probably also compiled the Romances.

Most of the songs come from Tetzcoco, with several attributed specifically to the ruler Nezahualcoyotl. Several of songs are also found with variations in the Cantares Mexicanos.

The Nahuatl text and a Spanish translation of the Romances, as well as the Geographical Relation, was published in 1964 by Ángel María Garibay K. as volume 1 of Poesía nahuatl.

John Bierhorst produced the first full English prose translation of the Romances along with a paleographic transcription of the Nahuatl text, published in 2010 by the University of Texas Press and now available as an e-text. David Bowles crafted English verse versions of select songs from the Romances in his Flower, Song, Dance: Aztec and Mayan Poetry, released in 2013 by Lamar University Press. Bowles is now releasing annotated English translations with normalized Nahuatl texts on Medium under the title Songs of the Lords of Anahuac.

== See also ==
- Cantares Mexicanos
