= Cantares Mexicanos =

Collection of 16th century Nahuatl verses

Nahuatl in Mexico

The Cantares Mexicanos is a manuscript collection of Nahuatl songs or poems recorded in the 16th century. The 91 songs of the Cantares form the largest Nahuatl song collection, containing over half of all known traditional Nahuatl songs. It is currently located in the National Library of Mexico in Mexico City. A description is found in the census of prose manuscripts in the native tradition in the Handbook of Middle American Indians.

The ninety-one songs are made up of short stanzas averaging about thirty words each, presented in the manuscript as hanging paragraphs (of which there are about 1,700). Many of the songs have eight stanzas; most have more, and the longest has 114.

From internal evidence and the contemporary ethnography of Sahagún and other observers, we know that such songs were performed to the accompaniment of the upright skin drum (huehuetl) and the horizontal log drum (teponaztli), each capable of producing two tones spanning an interval such as a fifth or a major third. Gongs, horns, and other instruments could be added; the full program might include costumed dancing, often with mimicry.

A Spanish edition and translation of much of the manuscript was given by Mexican scholar Ángel María Garibay Kintana in the second and third volumes of his Poesía náhuatl (1965, 1968). It was not until Miguel León-Portilla edited a two-volume Spanish translation of the codex, published by the National Autonomous University of Mexico, that the entire Cantares was rendered in Spanish.

A complete paleographic transcription and English translation of the Cantares was published in 1985 by John Bierhorst as Cantares Mexicanos: Songs of the Aztecs, as well as a dictionary and concordance. Although Bierhorst's transcription was appreciated by scholars for its accuracy and faithfulness to the original manuscript, his translations were criticized as misleading and colored by his view that the Cantares are "ghost songs", part of a colonial revitalization movement parallel to the ghost dances of the Plains Indians. David Bowles, in his translations of selected poems from the Cantares and other Mesoamerican codices, agrees with León-Portilla and Garibay that the songs are part of a long aesthetic and philosophical tradition predating the Conquest.

== See also ==
- Romances de los señores de Nueva España
