= Nahuatl language in the United States =

Geographical distribution of Nahuan languages by number of first- and second-language speakers.

The Nahuatl language in the United States is spoken primarily by Mexican immigrants from Indigenous communities and Chicanos who study and speak Nahuatl as L2. Despite the fact that there is no official census of the language in the North American country, it is estimated that there are around 140,800 Nahuatl speakers. During the last decades, the United States has carried out many educational initiatives aimed at teaching Nahuatl as a language of cultural heritage.

Thanks to first-hand sources collected over several decades, it is known that there are Nahua communities in the cities of Los Angeles, Houston, Chicago, Atlanta and Riverside, with the first two (known as the "Nahua migratory capital cities" since they were established as international referents of the Nahua region since the 1980s) where community networks have been consolidated. In California, Nahuatl is the fourth Indigenous language of Mexico that is most present in the state's agriculture, behind Mixtec, Zapotec and Triqui.

The California Indigenous Farmworker Study (IFS) estimates based on the California Indigenous Community Survey (ICS) that, in rural areas of that state alone, there are about 165,000 Mexicans who speak an Indigenous language from the states of Oaxaca (Zapotec, Mixtec, Mazatec, Mixe, Triqui), Guerrero (Nahuatl, Mixtec, Tlapaneco, Amuzgo), Puebla (Nahuatl, Totonac) and Michoacán (Purepecha, Nahuatl), mainly. However, the number of speakers of each language is not specified and the speaking population in urban areas is not included.

== Use in education ==
Many universities, centers and schools in the United States offer Nahuatl classes. The first university to start a teaching program was Yale University, in 1998. The University of Utah is one of several academic institutions in the United States that regularly teach the Nahuatl language. There are also Nahuatl professors who teach Nahuatl classes at the University of Texas. The University of California in Los Angeles Latin American Institute has a program of classes in Nahuatl. The University of Arizona has been offering the language course since 2020, taught by a native speaker from the National Autonomous University of Mexico.

A charter school in Lynwood offers Nahuatl classes to its high school students, thanks to a graduate student from UCLA. In addition, a native speaker of Nahuatl has been teaching Nahuatl classes for 26 years at a local church in Santa Ana. Another educational institution, Academia Semillas del Pueblo, is a charter school in Los Angeles where the Nahua language and culture are taught to students of all ages.

== Use ==
Historically, there began to be Nahuatl communities for the first time in what is now the United States from the Tlaxcalan colonization in the north of the Viceroyalty of New Spain.

Unlike the other languages of Mexico that are spoken in the United States, a large portion of Nahuatl speakers are Mexican-Americans. Many of this group have created their own identity by connecting with the Mexica culture. Since Nahuatl is identified as the language of the Mexica, the Chicanos have appropriated it as a symbol of their identity. There are many who speak Nahuatl with native Mexican speakers and others who prefer only to speak it with other Chicanos. Likewise, the Nahuatl connection with its own identity is the reason why many of them have Nahuatl names.

On the other hand, Nahuatl is used by inmates in prisons in New Mexico, California and other states to speak in code, an issue that has greatly concerned officials. In many prisons in the United States, many Chicanos have taken it upon themselves to promote the language within the prison system (using it as prison slang). Typically, inmates also use the language to confuse and provoke guards, as in the known case of an inmate being reprimanded by a guard who says to her friend "¿tlen ahco ica inon cihuatl?" (What's up with that woman?). They also teach the language to new inmates, and there are cases of people from ethnic groups other than Mexican-Americans who ended up learning the language because they heard it every day.

In New Folsom, California, staff intercepted a Nahuatl dictionary, which shows the adaptation of the meaning of many words that ended up forming inmates' slang used when they speak the language. In this way, the achkawtli (chiefs) of the gangs issue their secret orders in Nahuatl so that the pitsomeh (pigs / policemen) cannot understand what they are doing or planning. In addition to these two terms, some of the words, variations and meanings of this argot are: kalpolli (school), siwatl (lady), kwilonyotl (punk), ixpol (northerners), kanpol (southerners), kawayoh (heroin), makwawitl (war club), malinalli (marijuana), mika (brother), toka (snitch), momo (your hand), kimichimi (spy), tekoni (speak), tla (yes), ma (no), ti (you), tlilli pol (blacks), topileh (law), towia (soldier), itstolli (shank), awilnema (intercourse), wel (good), mixchiya (wait), mixpantsinko (salutations), yakatl (point), pochtekatl (trader), pilli pol (small person), oktli (pruno), kan (south), pilli (senor) and kalli (cell).

In California, although Nahuatl is sometimes described without evidence as prevalent and numerous among immigrants, there are few speakers anywhere in the state. The Indigenous Farmworker Survey finds the vast majority of agricultural workers who speak a language Indigenous to the Americas spoke other languages, and all of them combined are only 1%. Nahua and Chatino are present in trace amounts. Nahua is also listed as only a trace finding – along with Acateco/Akateko, Chatino, Tarasco/Purépecha, Quiche/Kʼicheʼ, and Zoque – by the National Agricultural Workers Survey 2016.

In the fall of year 2016, an entire scene of an American television program was filmed in Spanish and modern Nahuatl, making that the first time the Mexicano language was heard on an American broadcast.

== See also ==
- Nahuatl
- Languages of the United States
- Chicano
- Mexican Americans
- Chicano Movement
- Prison slang
- Indigenous languages of the Americas
