= Tlatelolco =

Tlatelolco may refer to:

- Tlatelolco (altepetl), a pre-Columbian Aztec citystate
- Tlatelolco (archaeological site), an archaeological site in Mexico City, location of the Aztec citystate
- Tlatelolco, Mexico City, an area in the Cuauhtémoc borough of Mexico City
- Conjunto Urbano Nonoalco Tlatelolco, mega apartment complex
- The Tlatelolco massacre of 1968 in which Mexican police and military forces killed more than 300 protesting students
- Tlatelolco metro station, a station on the Mexico City Metro
- Tlatelolco (Mexico City Metrobús), a BRT station in Mexico City
- Treaty of Tlatelolco, a treaty for the prohibition of nuclear weapons in Latin America and the Caribbean
- Codex of Tlatelolco, a pictorial central Mexican manuscript
- Topos de Tlatelolco, a rescue brigade
