= Tepoztlán Ex Convento Museum =

Mexican museum

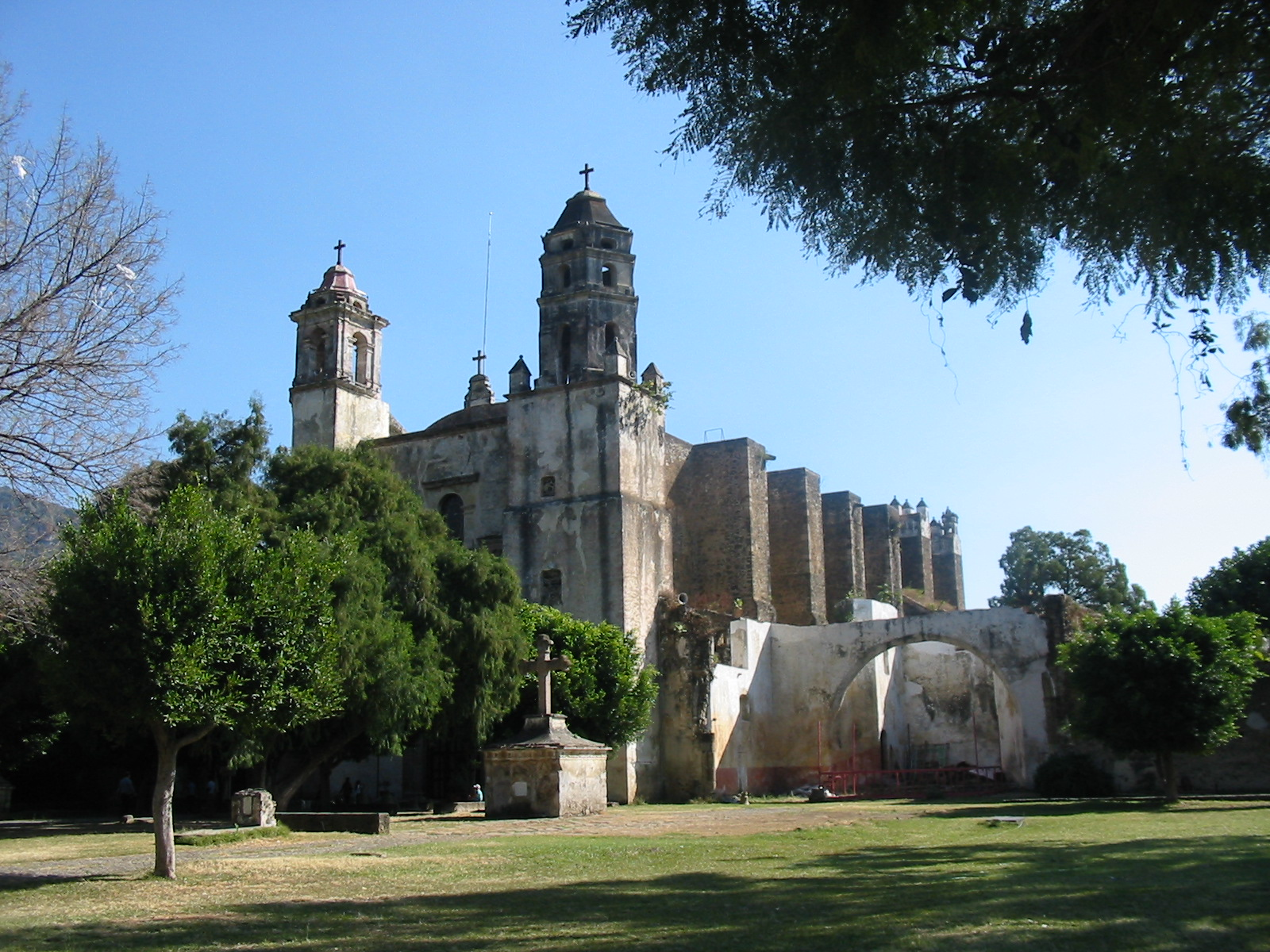
Ex Convento Dominican Church, Tepotzlan

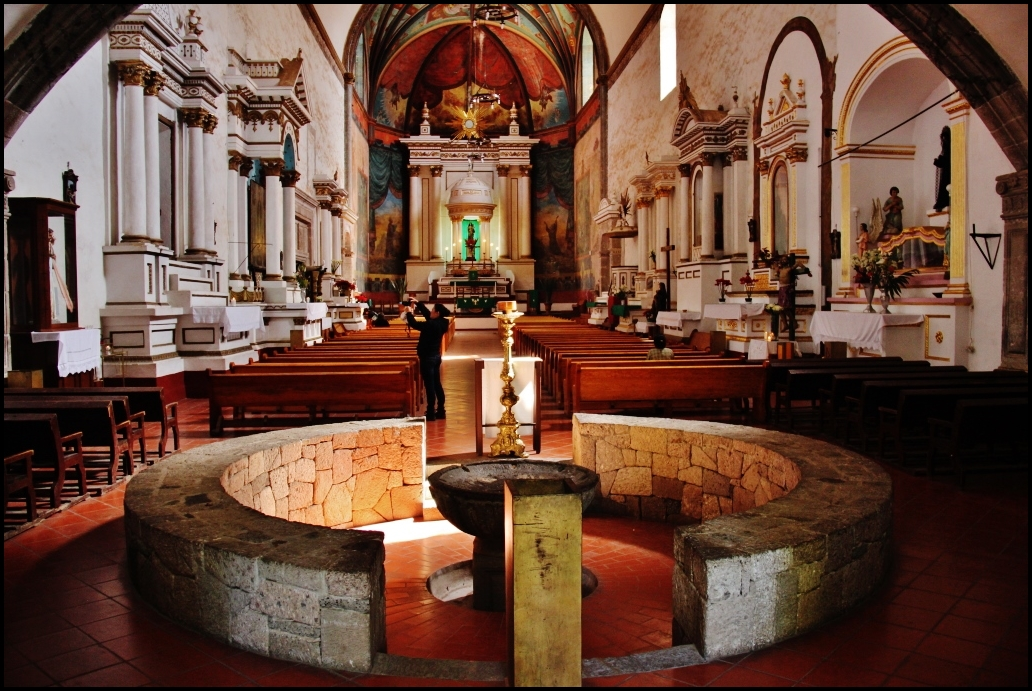
Ex Convento Dominico, Tepoztlán, Morelos, Mexico

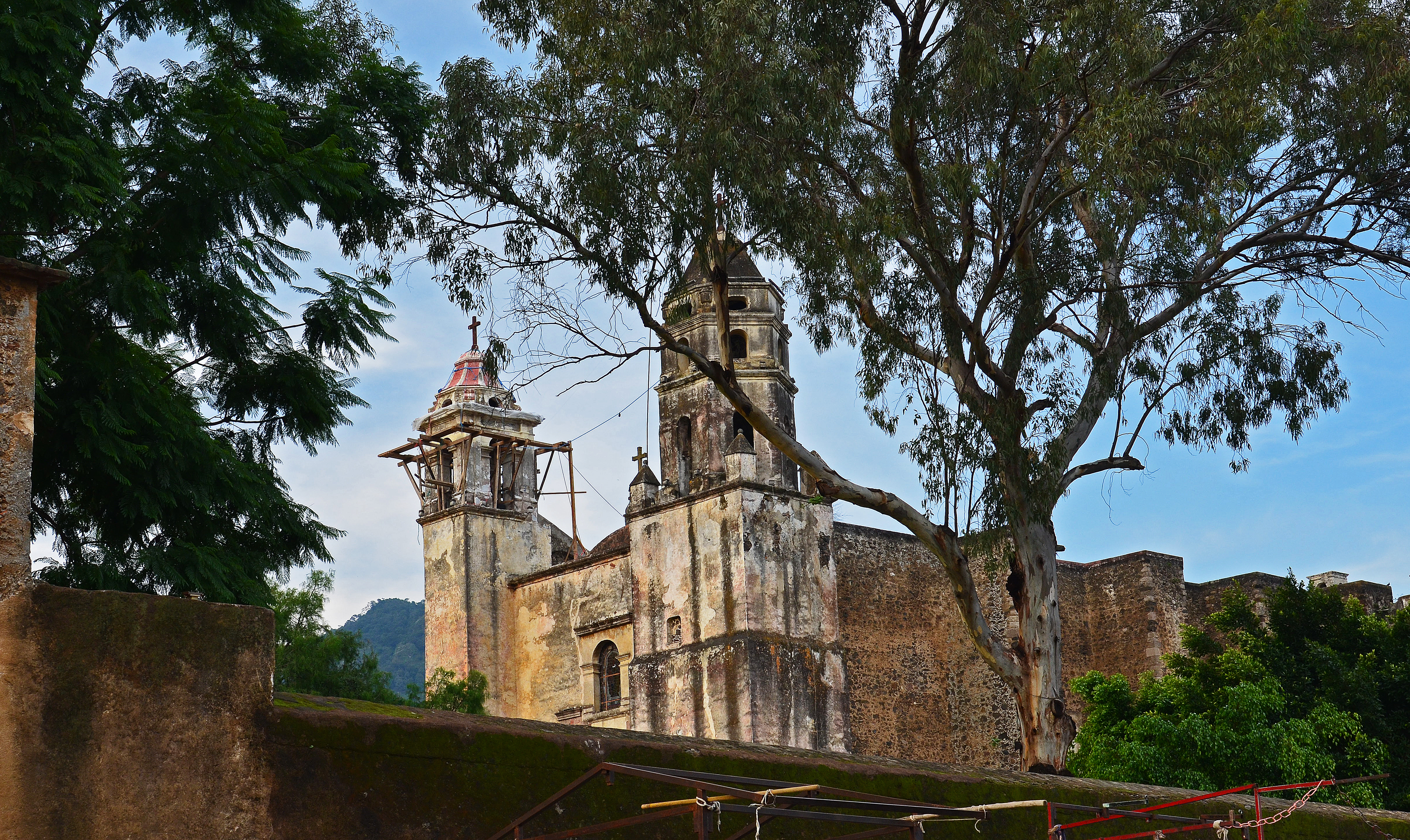
Ex-convent of the Dominico de la Nativdad church.

The Tepoztlán Ex Convento Museum (Spanish: Museo Ex Convento de Tepoztlán (Museo de la Natividad)) is a museum located at the Ex Convento Dominican Church in Tepoztlán, Mexico. The church was built by the Tepoztecan Indians under the orders of the Dominican friars between 1555 and 1580, dedicated to the Virgin of the Nativity. In 1993, INAH created a restoration project and in 1994 it was declared a World Heritage Site by UNESCO. This site is the parish of the Nativity and the Museum and Historical Documentation Center of Tepoztlán.

This monastery consists of a large atrium that has served as a cemetery and park. There are four capillas posas in each of the corners, although only the ones on the north side are well-preserved. The capillas posas were invented in Nueva España for the instruction of large crowds of Indigenous, and their use later spread to Guatemala, Colombia, Peru, and Bolivia. The convent was built with carved stones joined with lime mortar, sand, and vegetable binders. Although the construction of the convent seems simple, it is graced by different paintings on the interior walls. On the front (main entrance) is the Virgin of the Rosary, who is accompanied by saints, angels, and cherubs. Emblematic shields and the inevitable dog with the torch flaunt their Dominican presence. The museum located on the top floor of the Exconvento was inaugurated on November 26, 2000.

The walls of the church are high, supported by buttresses; these were probably added because of fears that earthquakes might otherwise damage the building. The towers are not part of the original construction but were added later; the north tower was damaged in the 1985 Mexico City earthquake. Despite large windows, the interior of the church is dark and the only architecturally significant piece besides the ceiling is a stone door with the shield of the Dominicans that leads to the abbey. There was doubtlessly a wooden altarpiece originally, but that has disappeared. The only paintings are of Our Lady of Guadalupe and an 18th-century anonymous painting of Calvary.

On the right side there is an altar with a sculpture of Christ, another of the Our Lady of Sorrows with four young girls dressed in black, and St. Dimas (the Good Thief). There is also a 20th-century Sacred Heart of Jesus; the original was destroyed during the Mexican Revolution.

The abbey was built on the north side of the building; there are wall that are four meters thick. Behind the abbey is the magnificent scenery of Tepoztlan; Manuel Toussaint called it "the perfect adaptation of a building with scenery, the unity of artistic conception with the environment."

On the lower level there is the entry to the Sacristy, the Sala Capitular (archives), entrance to the garden, Sala De Profundis (meditation room), Refractory with a stone sink, kitchen, and storerooms. Upstairs there are ten cells for the monks, each with a window with a view. The bells are dated "Enero 20 831" (sic), 1810, and 1830. The largest is inscribed, "Me llamo María de la Natividad. Mi primer nacimiento fel el año 1688 siendo Gbdor D. Bernadino Rojas. Mi segundo Nacimiento fue el año 1860. Fui bendecida por el Br. Fpe., González. Camilus Alviarensis me fecit." This bell is decorated with scorpions and lizards, which abound in the region.

The complex provides guided tours and a research library.
