= Vocabulario manual de las lenguas castellana y mexicana =

Spanish-Náhuatl dictionary by Pedro de Arenas

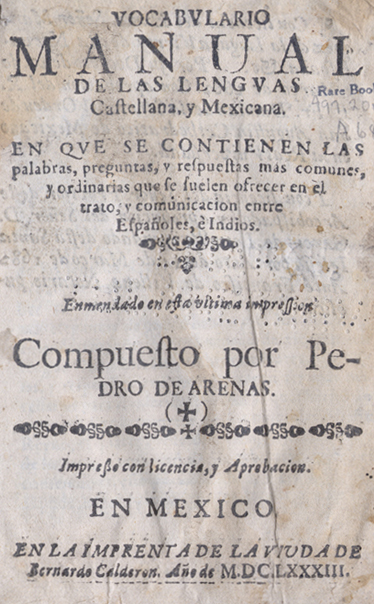
- 1683 edition.
- Author: Pedro de Arenas
- Language: Spanish
- Subject: Nahuatl language
- Genre: Dictionary
- Publisher: Various
- Publication date: Pre-1611
- Publication place: Mexico

Vocabulario manual de las lenguas castellana y mexicana is a Spanish-Nahuatl dictionary by Pedro de Arenas, first published some time before 1611 (the year of the second edition). It was one of the most popular Nahuatl dictionaries, going through at least eleven editions in 220 years.
