= Andrés de Olmos =

16th-century Spanish linguist of Mesoamerica

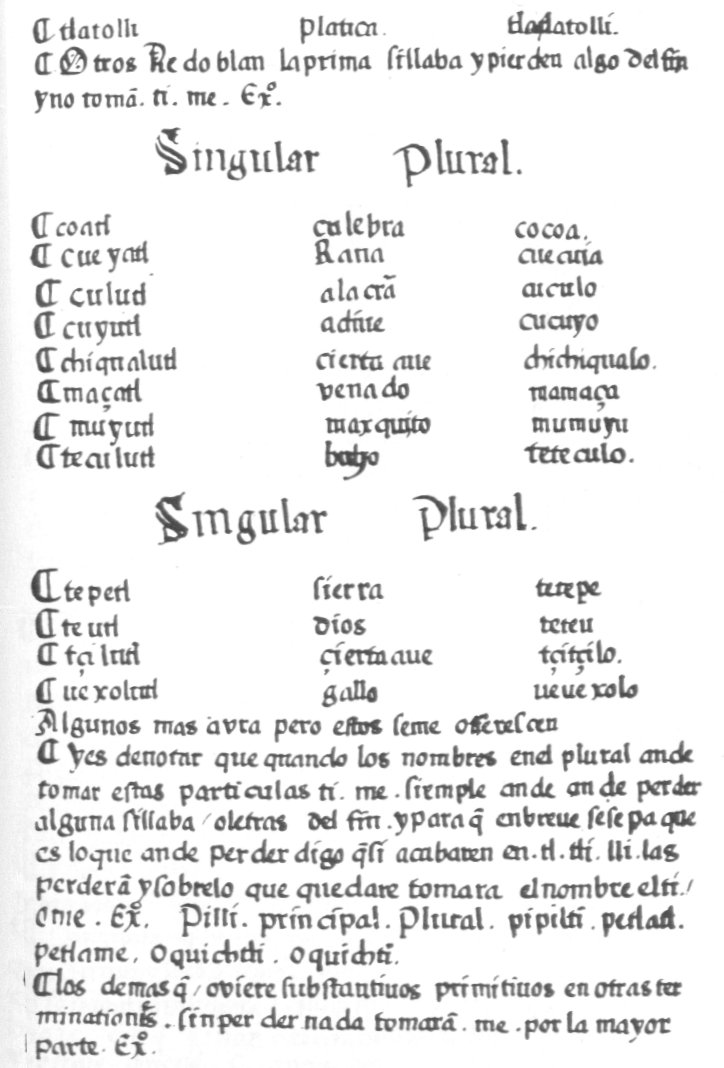
Page from Olmos' Arte de la Lengua Mexicana

Andrés de Olmos (c.1485 – 8 October 1571) was a Spanish Franciscan priest and grammarian and ethno-historian of Mexico's indigenous languages and peoples. He was born in Oña, Burgos, Spain and died in Tampico in New Spain (modern-day Tampico, Tamaulipas, Mexico). He is best known for his grammar, the first in the New World, of the Classical Nahuatl language.

== Life ==
In his early youth, Andrés de Olmos went to live with a married sister in Olmos, whence his name. He entered the Franciscan convent in Valladolid and was ordained a priest. He was appointed an assistant to Fray Juan de Zumárraga in 1527. He accompanied Zumárraga when the latter was sent by the Emperor Charles V in 1528 to be the first bishop of New Spain. As early as 1533, Olmos was recognized as unusually adept in the Nahuatl language and well-informed about the history and customs of the Nahuatl-speaking peoples. He contributed to the founding in 1536 of the Colegio de Santa Cruz de Tlatelolco, the first European-based institution of higher learning in the New World.

Olmos wrote a book, now lost, about the pre-Hispanic history, beliefs and religious practices of Mexico (some have suggested that this work might be the mysterious Crónica X). He also published a collection of Huehuetlahtolli, moral instruction from Nahuatl-speaking elders to their juniors, expressed in a highly stylized and polished, high-register language. He wrote several sermons in Nahuatl that have survived.

But he is best known for his Arte para aprender la lengua mexicana, completed in 1547. Although it was based on his own and others' previously written notes about Classical Nahuatl grammar, this was the first relatively complete grammatical description of an indigenous language of the New World. It antedates, by three years, the first grammatical description of the French language (by Louis Maigret in 1550) and, by thirty-nine years, the first grammatical description of the English language (by William Bullokar in 1586).

Olmos also published a Nahuatl Vocabulary. Much of his work on the Arte and the Vocabulary was done in Hueytlalpan, in Totonac country, where he settled c. 1539. There Olmos learned Totonac, and published an Arte and Vocabulary in that language; these have since been lost. In 1554, he moved to the Huasteca region, where he learned the Huastec (also known as Teenek) language and wrote yet another Arte and Vocabulary describing it.

== Significance ==
Nahuatl, Totonac and Huastec are from completely different linguistic stocks and represent three of the most important of Mexico's twenty language families. Olmos' work, particularly the Arte para aprender la lengua mexicana, was the model for many other Artes that followed on Nahuatl and other languages of the New World.
