= Horacio Carochi =

Jesuit priest and grammarian (1586–1666)

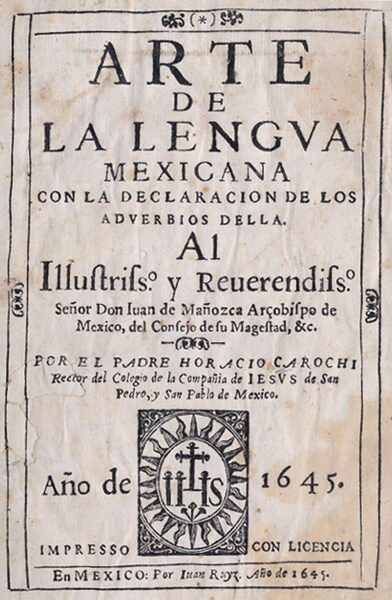
Frontispiece of Carochis "Arte de la Lengva Mexicana con la declaración de los adverbios della"

Horacio Carochi (1586–1666) was a Jesuit priest and grammarian who was born in Florence and died in New Spain. He is known for his grammar of the Classical Nahuatl language.

== Life ==
Carochi was born in Florence as Horazio Carocci. He went to Rome where he entered the Society of Jesus. From Rome he went to the New World, arriving in New Spain (now Mexico). There he dedicated himself to the study of the indigenous languages and became proficient in Otomi and then in Nahuatl. He was a friend of the Bishop and later Viceroy of New Spain, Juan de Palafox y Mendoza, as is documented by surviving letters written by Carochi to the bishop.

== Importance ==
Carochi had an acute understanding of the Nahuatl language and was the first grammarian to understand and propose a consistent transcription of two difficult phenomena in Nahuatl phonology, namely vowel length and the saltillo. His Arte or grammar was seen as important soon after its publication, and as early as 1759 a version edited by Ignacio Paredes was issued. This version, however, lacks most of the virtues of the original work.

His original Arte de la lengua Mexicana is considered by linguists today to be the finest and most useful of the extant early grammars of Nahuatl. He also wrote a grammar of Otomi, which is now lost.

== Works ==
Of the works of Carochi, only the Arte de la lengua Mexicana has been printed; the others exist only in manuscript form.

- Arte de la Lengua mexicana con la declaración de todos sus adverbios, printed in Mexico in 1645
- Vocabulario copioso de la Lengua mexicana
- Gramática de la Lengua Otomí
- Vocabulario Otomí
- Sermones en Lengua mexicana
