= Classical Nahuatl =

Lingua franca spoken in the Valley of Mexico in the 16th century

- Nāhuatlāhtōlli
- Pronunciation: [naːwat͡ɬaʔˈtoːlːi]
- Native to: Mexico
- Region: Aztec Empire. Postclassic Mesoamerica
- Era: 14th to 16th century, during the Late Postclassic and after Conquest of Mexico in the Early Colonial Period
- Language family: Uto-Aztecan languages: Nahuan languages; Nahuatl; Central Nahuatl languages; Nuclear Nahuatl; Classical Nahuatl
- Standard forms: Tecpillāhtōlli Colonial Nahuatl
- Writing system: Aztec script Latin alphabet (Nahuatl alphabet)

Language codes
- ISO 639-3: nci
- Glottolog: clas1250

Classical Nahuatl, also known simply as Aztec or Nahuatl, is a set of variants of Nahuatl spoken in the Valley of Mexico and central Mexico as a lingua franca at the time of the 16th-century Spanish conquest of the Aztec Empire. Indigenous languages, including Classical Nahuatl, remained dominant until the time when New Spain (Mexico) became independent in 1821. However, during the subsequent centuries, it was largely displaced by Spanish and evolved into some of the modern Nahuan languages in use (other modern dialects descend more directly from other 16th-century variants). Although classified as an extinct language, Classical Nahuatl has survived through a multitude of written sources transcribed by Nahua peoples and Spaniards in the Latin script.

Classical Nahuatl may be called Codical Nahuatl (when referring to the variants employed in the Mesoamerican codices through the medium of the Aztec script) or Colonial Nahuatl (if written in post-conquest documents in the Latin alphabet).

== Classification ==
Classical Nahuatl is one of the Nahuan languages within the Uto-Aztecan family. It is classified as a central dialect and is most closely related to the modern dialects of Nahuatl spoken in the valley of Mexico in colonial and modern times. It is probable that the Classical Nahuatl documented by 16th- and 17th-century written sources represents a particularly prestigious sociolect. That is to say, the variety of Nahuatl recorded in these documents is most likely to be more particularly representative of the speech of Aztec nobles (pīpiltin), while the commoners (mācēhualtin) spoke a somewhat different variety.

== Phonology ==
=== Vowels ===
	Front		Central		Back	
	short	long	short	long	short	long
Close	i	iː			o ~ u	oː ~ uː
Mid	e	eː			o ~ u	oː ~ uː
Open			a	aː		

Classical Nahuatl tends to rise /o(ː)/ into /u(ː)/ before penultimate syllables (always stressed), this is evidenced on proper names like Tullan, Tlatilulco, Huitzilopuchtli, etc.

=== Consonants ===
	Bilabial	Alveolar		Palatal	Velar		Glottal
	Bilabial	median	lateral	Palatal	plain	labial	Glottal
Plosive	p	t			k	kʷ	ʔ
Affricate		t͡s	t͡ɬ	t͡ʃ			
Fricative		s		ʃ			
Sonorant	m	n	l	j		w	

=== Accent ===
Stress generally falls on the penultimate syllable. The one exception is the vocative suffix (used by men) -é, which is added to the end of a word and is always stressed, e.g. Cuāuhtliquetzqui (a name, meaning "Eagle Warrior"), but Cuāuhtliquetzqué "O Cuauhtliquetzqui!"

When women use the vocative, the stress is shifted to the final syllable without adding any suffix. Oquichtli means "man", and oquichtlí means "O man!"

=== Phonotactics ===
Maximally complex Nahuatl syllables are of the form CVC; that is, there can be at most one consonant at the beginning and end of every syllable. In contrast, English, for example, allows up to three consonants syllable-initially and up to four consonants to occur at the end of syllables (e.g. strengths) (ngths = /ŋkθs/). Consonant clusters are only allowed word-medially, Nahuatl uses processes of both epenthesis (usually of /i/) and deletion to deal with this constraint.

For such purposes, tl /tɬ/, like all other affricates, is treated as a single sound, and not all consonants can occur in both syllable-initial and syllable-final position.

The sonorants /n/, /l/ and /w/ are devoiced in syllable-final position. Likewise, /j/ is also devoiced and merged into /ʃ/ in syllable-final position. The sonorant /m/ is the only one that is not devoiced in final position because it never appears in that position to begin with.

== Writing system ==
At the time of the Spanish conquest, Aztec writing used mostly pictograms supplemented with a few ideograms. When needed, it also used syllabic equivalences; Diego Durán recorded how the tlacuilos could render a prayer in Latin using this system but it was difficult to use. The writing system was adequate for keeping such records as genealogies, astronomical information, and tribute lists, but it could not represent a full vocabulary of spoken language in the way that the writing systems of the Old World or the Maya civilization's script could.

The Spanish introduced the Latin script, which was then used to record a large body of Aztec prose and poetry, which somewhat diminished the devastating loss caused by the burning of thousands of Aztec codices by the Spanish authorities.

Classical Nahuatl Romanisation schemes
Phoneme	IPA	Romanisation scheme
Phoneme	IPA	Michel Launey
/a/	[a]	a
/e/	[e]	e
/i/	[i]	i
/o/	[o]	o
/aː/	[aː]	ā
/eː/	[eː]	ē
/iː/	[iː]	ī
/oː/	[oː]	ō
/p/	[p]	p
/t/	[t]	t
/k/	[k]	qu (before i and e) c (in all other cases)
/ts/	[ts]	tz
/tʃ/	[tʃ]	ch
/tɬ/	[tɬ]	tl
/kʷ/	[kʷ]	cu (before vowels) uc (in all other cases)
/m/	[m]	m
/n/	[n]	n
/s/	[s]	c (before e and i) z (in all other cases)
/ʃ/	[ʃ]	x
/j/	[j]	y
/w/	[w]	hu (before vowels) uh (in all other cases)
/l/	[l]	l
/ll/	[lː]	ll
/ʔ/	[ʔ], [h]	◌̀ (on the preceding vowel within word) ◌̂ (on the preceding vowel at the end of a word)

== Literature ==
Nahuatl literature is extensive (probably the most extensive of all Indigenous languages of the Americas), including a relatively large corpus of poetry (see also Nezahualcoyotl). The Huei tlamahuiçoltica is an early sample of literary Nahuatl.

A bilingual dictionary with Spanish, Vocabulario manual de las lenguas castellana y mexicana, was first published in 1611 and is "the most important and most frequently reprinted Spanish work on Nahuatl," according to the World Digital Library.

== See also ==
- Aztec codices
- List of extinct languages of North America
- Mesoamerican language area

== Sources ==
- Aguilar, Andrés Ehecatl (2013). Phonological description of Huasteca Nahuatl from Chicontepec, Veracruz (Thesis). Northridge: California State University. p. 25. hdl:10211.2/3997.
- Andrews, J. Richard (2003). Introduction to classical Nahuatl (Rev. ed.). Norman: University of Oklahoma Press. ISBN 978-0-8061-3452-9.
- Arenas, Pedro de (1982) [1611]. Vocabulario manual de las lenguas castellana y mexicana. Facsímiles de lingüística y filología nahuas (in Spanish). Vol. 1. México: UNAM. ISBN 9789685802826. OCLC 9683091.
- Bedell, George (2011). "The Nahuatl Language" (PDF). Language in India. 11. ISSN 1930-2940.
- Brockway, Earl (1963). "The Phonemes of North Puebla Nahuatl". Anthropological Linguistics. 5 (2): 14–18. ISSN 0003-5483. JSTOR 30022406.
- Carochi, Horacio (1983) [1645]. Arte de la lengua mexicana: con la declaración de los adverbios della. Facsímiles de lingüística y filología nahuas (in Spanish). Vol. 2. Porrúa, México: UNAM. ISBN 9789685805865. OCLC 11443323.
- Curl, John (2005). Ancient American Poets. Tempe, AZ: Bilingual Press. ISBN 9781931010214. OCLC 52813965.
- Garibay, Angel María (1953). Historia de la literatura náhuatl (in Spanish). México.
- Garibay, Angel Maria (1962). Llave de Náhuatl (in Spanish) (2nd ed.). México. OCLC 460458910.
- Garibay, Angel María (1964). Poesía náhuatl (in Spanish). Vol. 1–3. México.
- Goller, Theodore R.; Goller, Patricia L.; Waterhouse, Viola G. (1974). "The Phonemes of Orizaba Nahuatl". International Journal of American Linguistics. 40 (2): 126–131. doi:10.1086/465295. S2CID 142992381.
- Humboldt, Wilhelm von (1994). Mexicanische Grammatik (in German). Paderborn/München.
- Karttunen, Frances (1992). An analytical dictionary of Nahuatl. Norman: University of Oklahoma Press. ISBN 9780806124216. OCLC 24846061.
- Karttunen, Frances; Lockhart, James (1976). Nahuatl in the Middle Years: Language Contact Phenomena in Texts of the Colonial Period. University of California publications in linguistics. Vol. 85. Berkeley: University of California Press. ISBN 9780520095618. OCLC 2905788.
- Launey, Michel (1980). Introduction à la langue et à la littérature aztèques (in French). Vol. 1–2. Paris: L'Harmattan. OCLC 6054103.
- Launey, Michel (1992). Introducción a la lengua y a la literatura Náhuatl (in Spanish). México: UNAM. ISBN 9789683619440. OCLC 29376295.
- Launey, Michel (2011). An introduction to classical Nahuatl. Cambridge: Cambridge University Press. ISBN 9780521518406.
- León-Portilla, Ascensión H. de (1988). Tepuztlahcuilolli, Impresos en Nahuatl: Historia y Bibliografia (in Spanish). Vol. 1–2. México: UNAM. OCLC 21031029.
- León-Portilla, Miguel (1992). Literaturas Indígenas de México (in Spanish). Madrid.
- Lockhart, James, ed. (1993). We people here. Nahuatl Accounts of the conquest of Mexico. Los Angeles.
- Molina, Fray Alonso de (1992) [1555]. Vocabulario en Lengua Castellana y Mexicana y Mexicana y Castellana (in Spanish). México: Librería Porrúa.
- Olmos, Fray Andrés de (1993) [1547]. Arte de la lengua mexicana concluído en el convento de San Andrés de Ueytlalpan, en la provincia de Totonacapan que es en la Nueva España (in Spanish). México.
- Rincón, Antonio del (1885) [1595]. Arte mexicana compuesta por el padre Antonio del Rincón (in Spanish). México.
- Sahagún, Fray Bernardino de (1499–1590): Florentine Codex. General History of the Things of New Spain (Historia General de las Cosas de la Nueva España). Eds Charles Dibble/Arthr Anderson, vol I-XII Santa Fe 1950–71
- Siméon, Rémi (1963) [1885, Paris]. Dictionnaire de la Langue Nahuatl ou Mexicaine (in French). Graz.
- Siméon, Rémi (2001) [1885, Paris]. Diccionario de la Lengua Nahuatl o Mexicana (in Spanish). México.
- Sullivan, Thelma D. (1988). Thelma D. Sullivan's Compendium of Nahuatl Grammar. Salt Lake City: University of Utah Press.
- The Nahua Newsletter: edited by the Center for Latin American and Caribbean Studies of the Indiana University (Chief Editor Alan Sandstrom)
- Estudios de Cultura Nahuatl: special interest-yearbook of the Instituto de Investigaciones Historicas (IIH) of the Universidad Autonoma de México (UNAM), Ed.: Miguel Leon Portilla
