= Nahuatl =

Uto-Aztecan language of Mexico

- Aztec, Mexicano
- Nawatlahtolli, Mexihkatlahtolli, Mexkatl, Mexikanoh, Masewaltlahtol, Nawatl, Mejicano
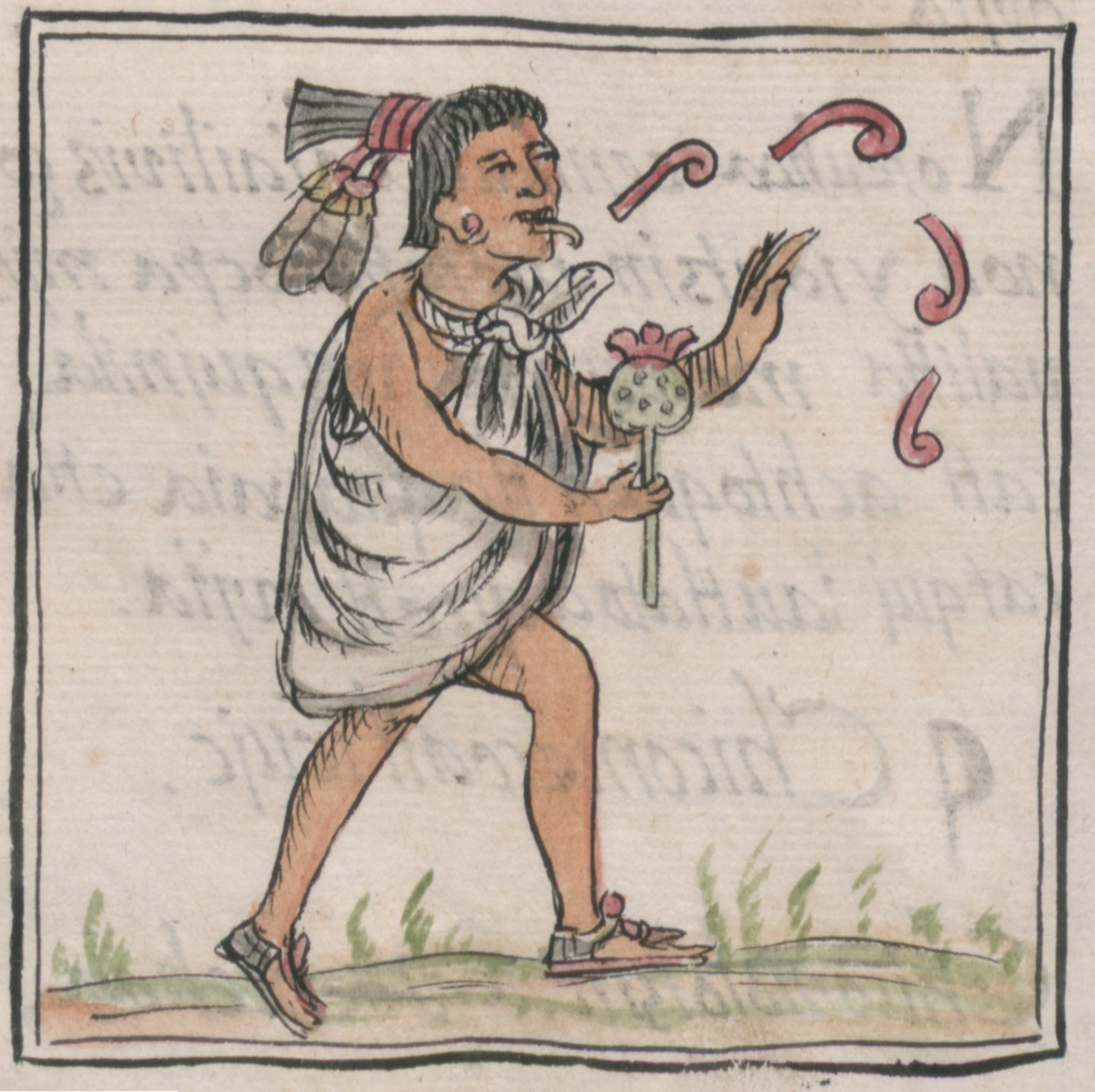
- Nahua man from the Florentine Codex. The speech scrolls indicate speech or song.
- Pronunciation: [ˈnaːwat͡ɬ]
- Native to: Mexico
- Region: North America, Central America
- Ethnicity: Nahuas
- Native speakers: 1.7 million in Mexico, smaller number of speakers among Nahua immigrant communities in the United States (2020 census)
- Language family: Uto-Aztecan: Southern Uto-Aztecan; Nahuan; Nahuatl
- Early form: Proto-Nahuan
- Dialects: Western Peripheral Nahuatl; Eastern Peripheral Nahuatl; Huasteca Nahuatl; Central Nahuatl languages
- Writing system: Latin; Aztec script (until the 16th century)

Official status
- Official language in: Mexico
- Regulated by: Instituto Nacional de Lenguas Indígenas

Language codes
- ISO 639-2: nah
- ISO 639-3: nhe: Huasteca Nahuatl; See Nahuan languages
- Glottolog: azte1234 Aztec
- Current (red) and historical (green) geographic extent of Nahuatl

Nahuatl (English: /ˈnɑːwɑːtəl/ NAH-wah-təl; hispanicized from Nawatl pronounced [ˈnaːwat͡ɬ]), (Note: among other spellings: Naoatl and Nauatl. In a back-formation from the name of the language, the ethnic group of Nahuatl speakers are called Nahua.) Aztec, or Mexicano is a language or, by some definitions, a group of languages of the Uto-Aztecan language family. Varieties of Nahuatl are spoken by about 1.7 million Nahuas, most of whom live mainly in Central Mexico and have smaller populations in the United States. Nahuatl has been spoken in central Mexico since at least the seventh century AD. It was the language of the Mexica, who dominated what is now central Mexico during the Late Postclassic period of Mesoamerican history. During the centuries preceding the Spanish conquest of the Aztec Empire, the Aztecs had expanded to incorporate a large part of central Mexico. Their influence caused the variety of Nahuatl spoken by the residents of Tenochtitlan to become a prestige language in Mesoamerica.

Following the Spanish conquest, Spanish colonists and missionaries introduced the Latin script, and Nahuatl became a literary language. Many chronicles, grammars, works of poetry, administrative documents and codices were written in Nahuatl during the 16th and 17th centuries. This early literary language based on the Tenochtitlan variety has been labeled Classical Nahuatl. It is among the most studied and best-documented Indigenous languages of the Americas. In 1570, King Philip II of Spain decreed that Nahuatl should become the official language of the colonies of New Spain to facilitate communication between the Spanish and natives of the colonies.

Today, Nahuan languages are spoken in scattered communities, mostly in rural areas throughout central Mexico and along the coastline. A smaller number of speakers exists in immigrant communities predominantly in the United States. There are considerable differences among varieties, and some are not mutually intelligible. Huasteca Nahuatl, with over one million speakers, is the most-spoken variety. All varieties have been subject to varying degrees of influence from Spanish. No modern Nahuan languages are identical to Classical Nahuatl, but those spoken in and around the Valley of Mexico are generally more closely related to it than those on the periphery. Under Mexico's General Law of Linguistic Rights of the Indigenous Peoples, promulgated in 2003, Nahuatl and the other 63 Indigenous languages of Mexico are recognized as lenguas nacionales ('national languages') in the regions where they are spoken. They are given the same status as Spanish within their respective regions. (Note: By the provisions of Article IV: Las lenguas indígenas...y el español son lenguas nacionales...y tienen la misma validez en su territorio, localización y contexto en que se hablen. ("The indigenous languages ... and Spanish are national languages ... and have the same validity in their territory, location and context in which they are spoken."))

Nahuan languages exhibit a complex morphology, or system of word formation, characterized by polysynthesis and agglutination. This means that morphemes – words or fragments of words that each contain their own separate meaning – are often strung together to make longer complex words. Through a very long period of development alongside other Indigenous Mesoamerican languages, they have absorbed many influences, coming to form part of the Mesoamerican language area. Many words from Nahuatl were absorbed into Spanish and, from there, were diffused into hundreds of other languages in the region. Most of these loanwords denote objects indigenous to central Mexico, which the Spanish heard mentioned for the first time by their Nahuatl names. English has also absorbed words of Nahuatl origin, including avocado, chayote, chili, chipotle, chocolate, atlatl, coyote, peyote, axolotl and tomato. These words have since been adopted into dozens of languages around the world. The names of several countries, Mexico, Guatemala, and Nicaragua, derive from Nahuatl.

== Terminology ==
While Nahuatl is the most commonly used name for the language in English, native speakers often refer to the language as Mexicano/Mejicano, or some cognate of the term mācēhualli, meaning 'commoner'. The word Nahuatl is derived from the Classical Nahuatl word nāhuatlahtōlli [naːwat͡ɬaʔˈtoːliˀ] ('clear language'), from nāhuatl (noun stem nāhua + the absolutive (unpossessed) ending -tl) thought to mean 'a good, clear sound'. While it dates to the early colonial period at least, it is not used by all speakers and is new to many communities. Linguists commonly identify localized dialects of Nahuatl by adding as a qualifier the name of the village or area where that variety is spoken.

The language was formerly called Aztec because it was spoken by the Central Mexican peoples known as Aztecs (Nahuatl pronunciation: [asˈteːkaʔ]). Now, the term Aztec is rarely used for modern Nahuan languages, but linguists' traditional name of Aztecan for the branch of Uto-Aztecan that comprises Nahuatl, Nawat ("Pipil"), and Pochutec is still in use (although some linguists prefer Nahuan). Since 1978, the term General Aztec has been adopted by linguists to refer to the languages of the Aztecan branch excluding the Pochutec language.

Nahuatl came to be identified with the politically dominant mēxihcah [meːˈʃiʔkaʔ] ethnic group, and consequently the Nahuatl language has been called mēxihcacopa [meːʃiʔkaˈkopaˀ] (literally 'in the manner of Mexicas') or mēxihcatlahtolli 'Mexica language'. The language is now called Mexicano by many of its native speakers, a term dating to the early colonial period and usually pronounced the Spanish way, with [h] or [x] rather than [ʃ].

Many Nahuatl speakers refer to their language with a cognate derived from mācēhualli, the Nahuatl word for 'commoner'. One example of that is the Nahuatl spoken in Tetelcingo, Morelos, whose speakers call their language mösiehuali. The Nawat people of El Salvador refer to their language as Nāwat. The Nahuas of Durango call their language Mexicanero. Nahuatl speakers of the Isthmus of Tehuantepec, specifically the municipalities of Mecayapan and Tatahuicapan, Veracruz, call their language mela'tájtol (literally 'the straight language').

== Classification ==
Tree diagram of the relation between the Nahuan languages and the rest of the Uto-Aztecan language family, based on the internal classification of Nahuan given by Terrence Kaufman

As a language label, the term Nahuatl encompasses a group of closely related languages or divergent dialects within the Nahuan branch of the Uto-Aztecan language family. The Mexican Instituto Nacional de Lenguas Indígenas (Indigenous Languages Institute) recognizes 30 individual varieties within the "language group" labeled Nahuatl. The Ethnologue recognizes 28 varieties with separate ISO codes. Sometimes Nahuatl is also applied to the Nawat language of El Salvador and Nicaragua. Regardless of whether Nahuatl is considered to refer to a dialect continuum or a group of separate languages, the varieties form a single branch within the Uto-Aztecan family, descended from a single Proto-Nahuan language. Within Mexico, the question of whether to consider individual varieties to be languages or dialects of a single language is highly political.

In the past, the branch of Uto-Aztecan to which Nahuatl belongs has been called Aztecan. From the 1990s onward, the alternative designation Nahuan has been frequently used instead, especially in Spanish-language publications. The Nahuan (Aztecan) branch of Uto-Aztecan is widely accepted as having two divisions: General Aztec and Pochutec.

General Aztec encompasses the Nahuatl and Pipil languages. (Note: Canger 2000, p. 385: "General Aztec is a generally accepted term referring to the most shallow common stage, reconstructed for all present-day Nahuatl varieties; it does not include the Pochutec dialect.") Pochutec is a scantily attested language, which became extinct in the 20th century, and which Campbell and Langacker classify as being outside general Aztec. Other researchers have argued that Pochutec should be considered a divergent variant of the western periphery.

Nahuatl denotes at least Classical Nahuatl, together with related modern languages spoken in Mexico. The inclusion of Pipil in this group is debated among linguists. Lyle Campbell classified Pipil as separate from the Nahuatl branch within general Aztecan, whereas dialectologists such as Una Canger, Karen Dakin, Yolanda Lastra, and Terrence Kaufman have preferred to include Pipil within the General Aztecan branch, citing close historical ties with the eastern peripheral dialects of General Aztec.

The current subclassification of Nahuatl rests on research by Canger (1980), Canger (1988) and Lastra de Suárez (1986). Canger introduced the scheme of a Central grouping and two Peripheral groups, and Lastra confirmed this notion, differing in some details. Canger & Dakin (1985) demonstrated a basic split between Eastern and Western branches of Nahuan, considered to reflect the oldest division of the proto-Nahuan speech community. Canger originally considered the central dialect area to be an innovative subarea within the Western branch, but in 2011, she suggested that it arose as an urban koiné language with features from both Western and Eastern dialect areas. Canger (1988) tentatively included dialects of La Huasteca in the Central group, while Lastra de Suárez (1986) places them in the Eastern Periphery, which was followed by Kaufman (2001).

== History ==
=== Pre-Columbian period ===
On the issue of geographic origin, the consensus of linguists during the 20th century was that the Uto-Aztecan language family originated in the southwestern United States. Evidence from archaeology and ethnohistory supports the thesis of a southward diffusion across the North American continent, specifically that speakers of early Nahuan languages migrated from Aridoamerica into central Mexico in several waves. But recently, the traditional assessment has been challenged by Jane H. Hill, who proposes instead that the Uto-Aztecan language family originated in central Mexico and spread northwards at a very early date. This hypothesis and the analyses of data that it rests upon have received serious criticism.

The proposed migration of speakers of the Proto-Nahuan language into the Mesoamerican region has been placed at sometime around AD 500, towards the end of the Early Classic period in Mesoamerican chronology. Before reaching the Mexican Plateau, pre-Nahuan groups probably spent a period of time in contact with the Uto-Aztecan Cora and Huichol of northwestern Mexico.

The major political and cultural center of Mesoamerica in the Early Classic period was Teotihuacan. The identity of the language(s) spoken by Teotihuacan's founders has long been debated, with the relationship of Nahuatl to Teotihuacan being prominent in that enquiry. It was presumed by scholars during the 19th and early 20th centuries that Teotihuacan had been founded by speakers of Nahuatl, but later linguistic and archaeological research tended to disconfirm this view. Instead, the timing of the Nahuatl influx was seen to coincide more closely with Teotihuacan's fall than its rise, and other candidates such as Totonacan identified as more likely. In the late 20th century, epigraphical evidence has suggested the possibility that other Mesoamerican languages were borrowing vocabulary from Proto-Nahuan much earlier than previously thought.

In Mesoamerica the Mayan, Oto-Manguean and Mixe–Zoque languages had coexisted for millennia. This had given rise to the Mesoamerican language area. After the Nahuas migrated into the Mesoamerican cultural zone, their language likely adopted various areal traits, which included relational nouns and calques added to the vocabulary, and a distinctly Mesoamerican grammatical construction for indicating possession.

A language which was the ancestor of Pochutec split from Proto-Nahuan (or Proto-Aztecan) possibly as early as AD 400, arriving in Mesoamerica a few centuries earlier than the bulk of Nahuan speakers. Some Nahuan groups migrated south along the Central American isthmus, reaching as far as Nicaragua. The critically endangered Pipil language of El Salvador is the only living descendant of the variety of Nahuatl once spoken south of present-day Mexico.

During the 7th century, Nahuan speakers rose to power in central Mexico. The people of the Toltec culture of Tula, which was active in central Mexico around the 10th century, are thought to have been Nahuatl speakers. By the 11th century, Nahuatl speakers were dominant in the Valley of Mexico and far beyond, with settlements including Azcapotzalco, Colhuacan and Cholula rising to prominence. Nahua migrations into the region from the north continued into the Postclassic period. The Mexica were among the latest groups to arrive in the Valley of Mexico; they settled on an island in the Lake Texcoco, subjugated the surrounding tribes, and ultimately an empire named Tenochtitlan. Mexica political and linguistic influence ultimately extended into Central America, and Nahuatl became a lingua franca among merchants and elites in Mesoamerica, such as with the Maya Kʼicheʼ people. As Tenochtitlan grew to become the largest urban center in Central America and one of the largest in the world at the time, it attracted Nahuatl speakers from diverse areas giving birth to an urban form of Nahuatl with traits from many dialects. This urbanized variety of Tenochtitlan is what came to be known as Classical Nahuatl as documented in colonial times.

=== Colonial period ===
With the arrival of the Spanish in 1519, Nahuatl was displaced as the dominant regional language, but remained important in Nahua communities under Spanish rule. Nahuatl was documented extensively during the colonial period in Tlaxcala, Cuernavaca, Culhuacan, Coyoacan, Toluca and other locations in the Valley of Mexico and beyond. In the 1970s, scholars of Mesoamerican ethnohistory have analyzed local-level texts in Nahuatl and other Indigenous languages to gain insight into cultural change in the colonial era via linguistic changes, known at present as the New Philology. Several of these texts have been translated and published either in part or in their entirety. The types of documentation include censuses, especially one early set from the Cuernavaca region, town council records from Tlaxcala, as well as the testimony of Nahua individuals.

As the Spanish had made alliances with Nahuatl-speaking peoples—initially from Tlaxcala, and later the conquered Mexica of Tenochtitlan—Nahuatl continued spreading throughout Mesoamerica in the decades after the conquest. Spanish expeditions with thousands of Nahua soldiers marched north and south to conquer new territories. Jesuit missions in what is now northern Mexico and the southwestern United States often included a barrio of Tlaxcaltec soldiers who remained to guard the mission. For example, some fourteen years after the northeastern city of Saltillo was founded in 1577, a Tlaxcaltec community was resettled in a separate nearby village, San Esteban de Nueva Tlaxcala, to cultivate the land and aid colonization efforts that had stalled in the face of local hostility to the Spanish settlement. Pedro de Alvarado conquered Guatemala with the help of tens of thousands of Tlaxcaltec allies, who then settled outside of modern Antigua Guatemala.

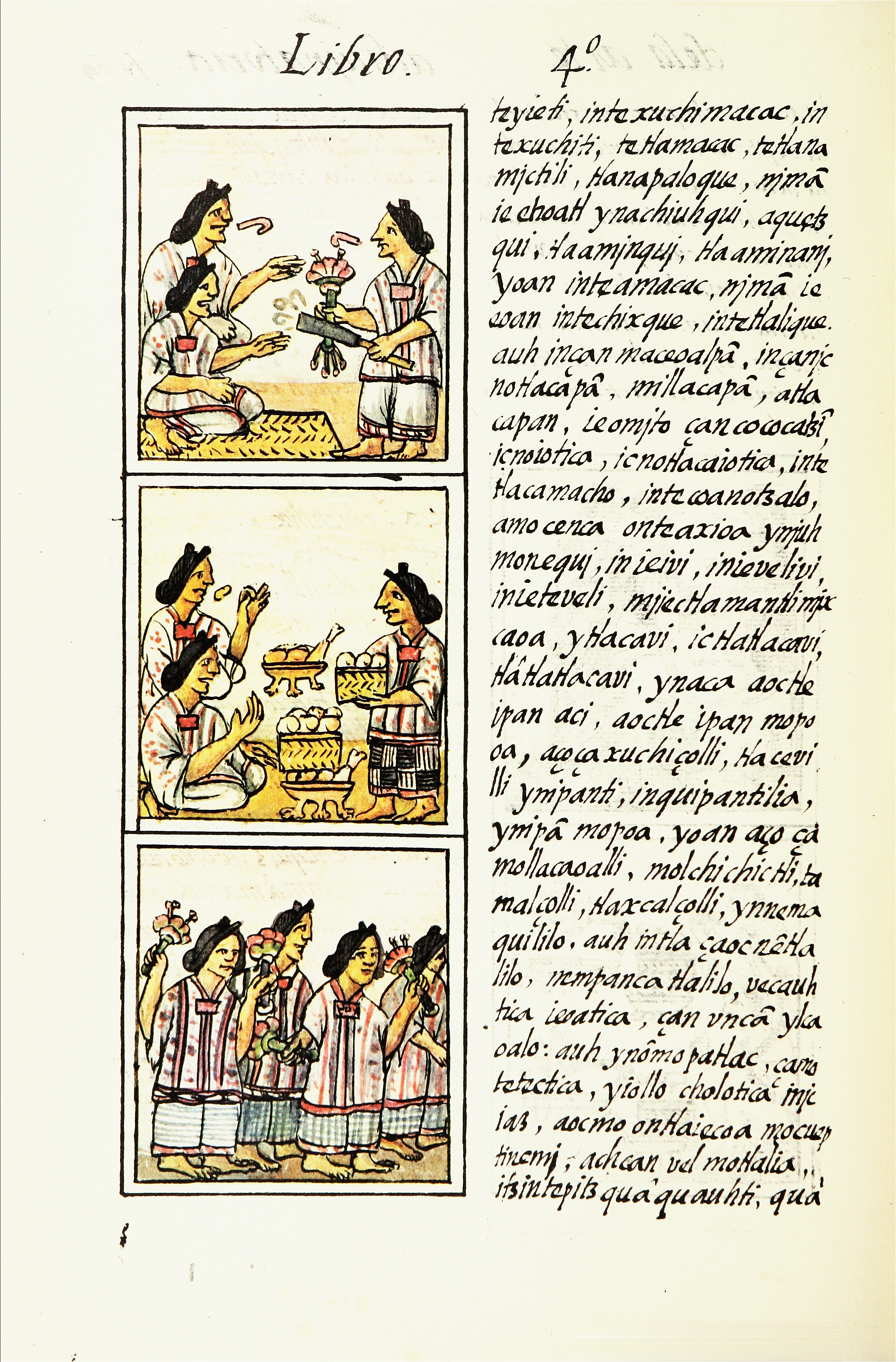
Page of Book IV from the Florentine Codex, featuring Nahuatl written using the Latin alphabet

As a part of their efforts, missionaries belonging to several religious orders—principally Jesuits, as well as Franciscan and Dominican friars—introduced the Latin alphabet to the Nahuas. Within twenty years of the Spanish arrival, texts in Nahuatl were being written using the Latin script. Simultaneously, schools were founded, such as the Colegio de Santa Cruz de Tlatelolco in 1536, which taught both Indigenous and classical European languages to both Native Americans and priests. Missionaries authored of grammars for Indigenous languages for use by priests. The first Nahuatl grammar, written by Andrés de Olmos, was published in 1547–3 years before the first grammar in French, and 39 years before the first one in English. By 1645, four more had been published, authored respectively by Alonso de Molina (1571), Antonio del Rincón (1595), Diego de Galdo Guzmán (1642), and Horacio Carochi (1645). Carochi's is today considered the most important colonial-era grammar of Nahuatl. Carochi has been particularly important for scholars working in the New Philology, such that there is a 2001 English translation of Carochi's 1645 grammar by James Lockhart. Through contact with Spanish the Nahuatl language adopted many loan words, and as bilingualism intensified, changes in the grammatical structure of Nahuatl followed.

In 1570, King Philip II of Spain decreed that Nahuatl should become the official language of the colonies of New Spain to facilitate communication between the Spanish and natives of the colonies. This led to Spanish missionaries teaching Nahuatl to Amerindians living as far south as Honduras and El Salvador. During the 16th and 17th centuries, Classical Nahuatl was used as a literary language; a large corpus dating to the period remains extant. They include histories, chronicles, poetry, theatrical works, Christian canonical works, ethnographic descriptions, and administrative documents. The Spanish permitted a great deal of autonomy in the local administration of Indigenous towns during this period, and in many Nahuatl-speaking towns the language was the de facto administrative language both in writing and speech. A large body of Nahuatl literature was composed during this period, including the Florentine Codex, a twelve-volume compendium of Aztec culture compiled by Franciscan Bernardino de Sahagún; Crónica Mexicayotl, a chronicle of the royal lineage of Tenochtitlan by Fernando Alvarado Tezozómoc; Cantares Mexicanos, a collection of songs in Nahuatl; a Nahuatl-Spanish/Spanish-Nahuatl dictionary compiled by Alonso de Molina; and the Huei tlamahuiçoltica, a description in Nahuatl of the apparition of Our Lady of Guadalupe.

Grammars and dictionaries of Indigenous languages were composed throughout the colonial period, but their quality was highest in the initial period. The friars found that learning all the Indigenous languages was impossible in practice, so they concentrated on Nahuatl. For a time, the linguistic situation in Mesoamerica remained relatively stable, but in 1696, Charles II of Spain issued a decree banning the use of any language other than Spanish throughout the Spanish Empire. In 1770, another decree, calling for the elimination of the Indigenous languages, did away with Classical Nahuatl as a literary language. Until the end of the Mexican War of Independence in 1821, the Spanish courts admitted Nahuatl testimony and documentation as evidence in lawsuits, with court translators rendering it in Spanish.

=== 20th and 21st centuries ===
Throughout the modern period the situation of Indigenous languages has grown increasingly precarious in Mexico, and the numbers of speakers of virtually all Indigenous languages have dwindled. While the total number of Nahuatl speakers increased over the 20th century, Indigenous populations have become increasingly marginalized in Mexican society. In 1895, Nahuatl was spoken by over 5% of the population. By 2000, this figure had fallen to 1.49%. Given the process of marginalization combined with the trend of migration to urban areas and to the United States, some linguists are warning of impending language death. At present Nahuatl is mostly spoken in rural areas by an impoverished class of Indigenous subsistence agriculturists. According to the Mexican National Institute of Statistics and Geography (INEGI), as of 2005 51% of Nahuatl speakers are involved in the farming sector and 6 in 10 Nahuatl-speakers who work receive no wages or less than the minimum wage.

For most of the 20th century, Mexican educational policy focused on the Hispanicization of Indigenous communities, teaching only Spanish and discouraging the use of Indigenous languages. As a result, one scholar estimated in 1983 that there was no group of Nahuatl speakers who had attained general literacy (that is, the ability to read the classical language) in Nahuatl, and Nahuatl speakers' literacy rate in Spanish also remained much lower than the national average. Nahuatl is spoken by over 1 million people, with approximately 10% of speakers being monolingual. As a whole, Nahuatl is not considered to be an endangered language; however, during the late 20th century several Nahuatl dialects became extinct.

The 1990s saw radical changes in Mexican policy concerning Indigenous and linguistic rights. Developments of accords in the international rights arena (Note: Such as the 1996 adoption at a world linguistics conference in Barcelona of the Universal Declaration of Linguistic Rights, a declaration which "became a general reference point for the evolution and discussion of linguistic rights in Mexico" Pellicer, Cifuentes & Herrera 2006, p. 132) combined with domestic pressures (such as social and political agitation by the Zapatista Army of National Liberation and Indigenous social movements) led to legislative reforms and the creation of decentralized government agencies like the National Commission for the Development of Indigenous Peoples (CDI) and the Instituto Nacional de Lenguas Indígenas (INALI) with responsibilities for the promotion and protection of Indigenous communities and languages.

In particular, the federal Ley General de Derechos Lingüísticos de los Pueblos Indígenas ['General Law on the Language Rights of the Indigenous Peoples', promulgated 13 March 2003] recognizes all the country's Indigenous languages, including Nahuatl, as national languages and gives Indigenous people the right to use them in all spheres of public and private life. In Article 11, it grants access to compulsory intercultural bilingual education. Nonetheless, progress towards institutionalizing Nahuatl and securing linguistic rights for its speakers has been slow.

== Demography and distribution ==
Nahuatl speakers over 5 years of age in the ten states with most speakers (2000 census data). Absolute and relative numbers. Percentages given are in comparison to the total population of the corresponding state. INEGI 2005, p. 4
Region	Totals	Percentages
Mexico City	37,450	0.44%
Guerrero	136,681	4.44%
Hidalgo	221,684	9.92%
State of Mexico	55,802	0.43%
Morelos	18,656	1.20%
Oaxaca	10,979	0.32%
Puebla	416,968	8.21%
San Luis Potosí	138,523	6.02%
Tlaxcala	23,737	2.47%
Veracruz	338,324	4.90%
Rest of Mexico	50,132	0.10%
Total	1,448,937	1.49%

Number of Nahuatl speakers by Mexican state in 2020. Source: INEGI

Today, a spectrum of Nahuan languages are spoken in scattered areas stretching from the northern state of Durango to Tabasco in the southeast. Nawat (also called Pipil, which is considered pejorative) the southernmost Nahuan language, is spoken in El Salvador by a small number of speakers. According to IRIN-International, the Nawat Language Recovery Initiative project, there are no reliable figures for the contemporary numbers of speakers of Nawat. Numbers may range anywhere from "perhaps a few hundred people, perhaps only a few dozen".

According to the 2000 census by INEGI, Nahuatl is spoken by an estimated 1.45 million people, some 198,000 (14.9%) of whom are monolingual. There are many more female than male monolinguals, and women represent nearly two-thirds of the total number. The states of Guerrero and Hidalgo have the highest rates of monolingual Nahuatl speakers relative to the total Nahuatl speaking population, at 24.2% and 22.6%, respectively. For most other states the percentage of monolinguals among the speakers is less than 5%. This means that in most states more than 95% of the Nahuatl speaking population are bilingual in Spanish. According to one study, how often Nahuatl is used is linked to community well-being, partly because it is tied to positive emotions.

The largest concentrations of Nahuatl speakers are found in the states of Puebla, Veracruz, Hidalgo, San Luis Potosí, and Guerrero. Significant populations are also found in the State of Mexico, Morelos, and Mexico City, with smaller communities in Michoacán and Durango. Nahuatl became extinct in the states of Jalisco, Colima, Coahuila and Chiapas during the 20th century. As a result of internal migration within the country, Nahuatl speaking communities exist in all states in Mexico. The modern influx of Mexican workers and families into the United States has resulted in the establishment of small Nahuatl speaking communities in the United States, particularly in California, New York, Texas, New Mexico and Arizona.

== Contact phenomena ==
Nearly 500 years of intense contact between speakers of Nahuatl and speakers of Spanish, combined with the minority status of Nahuatl and the higher prestige associated with Spanish, have caused many changes in modern Nahuatl varieties, with large numbers of words borrowed from Spanish into Nahuatl, and the introduction of new syntactic constructions and grammatical categories.

For example, a construction like the following, with several borrowed words and particles, is common in many modern varieties (Spanish loanwords in boldface):

pero āmo tēchentenderoa lo que tlen tictoah en mexicano.
but not they-us-understand-PL that which what we-it-say in Nahuatl
"But they don't understand what we say in Nahuatl" (Malinche Nahuatl)

In some modern dialects, basic word order has become a fixed subject–verb–object, probably under influence from Spanish. Other changes in the syntax of modern Nahuatl include the use of Spanish prepositions instead of native postpositions or relational nouns and the reinterpretation of original postpositions/relational nouns into prepositions. In the following example, from Michoacán Nahuatl, the postposition -ka meaning 'with' appears used as a preposition, with no preceding object:

ti-ya ti-k-wika ka tel
you-go you-it-carry with you
"are you going to carry it with you?" (Michoacán Nahuatl)

In this example from Mexicanero Nahuatl, of Durango, the original postposition/relational noun -pin 'in/on' is used as a preposition. Also, porque, a conjunction borrowed from Spanish, occurs in the sentence.

amo wel kalaki-yá pin kal porke ʣakwa-tiká im pwerta
not can he-enter-PAST in house because it-closed-was the door
"He couldn't enter the house because the door was closed" (Mexicanero Nahuat)

Many dialects have also undergone a degree of simplification of their morphology that has caused some scholars to consider them no longer polysynthetic.

== Phonology ==
Nahuan languages are defined as a subgroup of Uto-Aztecan by having undergone a number of shared changes from the Proto-Uto-Aztecan language (PUA). The table below shows the phonemic inventory of Classical Nahuatl as an example of a typical Nahuan language. In some dialects, the /t͡ɬ/ phoneme, which was common in Classical Nahuatl, has changed into either /t/, as in Isthmus Nahuatl, Mexicanero and Pipil, or into /l/, as in Michoacán Nahuatl. Many dialects no longer distinguish between short and long vowels. Some have introduced completely new vowel qualities to compensate, as is the case for Tetelcingo Nahuatl. Others have developed a pitch accent, such as Nahuatl of Oapan, Guerrero. Many modern dialects have also borrowed phonemes from Spanish, such as /β, d, ɡ, ɸ/.

=== Vowels ===
Classical Nahuatl vowels
	Front		Central		Back	
	short	long	short	long	short	long
Close	i	iː			o ~ u	oː ~ uː
Mid	e	eː			o ~ u	oː ~ uː
Open			a	aː		

In many Nahuatl dialects, vowel length contrast is vague, and in others it has become lost entirely. The dialect spoken in Tetelcingo (nhg) developed the vowel length into a difference in quality:

	Long vowels				Short vowels			
Classical Nahuatl	/iː/	/eː/	/aː/	/oː/	/i/	/e/	/a/	/o/
Tetelcingo dialect	/i/	/i̯e/	/ɔ/	/u/	/ɪ/	/e/	/a/	/o/

=== Consonants ===
Classical Nahuatl consonants
	Labial	Alveolar		Palatal	Velar		Glottal
	Labial	median	lateral	Palatal	plain	labial	Glottal
Nasal	m	n					
Plosive	p	t			k	kʷ	ʔ
Affricate		t͡s	t͡ɬ	t͡ʃ			
Fricative		s		ʃ			(h)
Approximant			l	j		w	

- The glottal phoneme, called the saltillo, occurs only after vowels. In many modern dialects it is realized as a fricative [h], but in others, as in Classical Nahuatl, it is a stop [ʔ].
- In many dialects, the approximants are devoiced in word-final and syllable-final position, i.e. /j w l/ are realized [j̊ w̥ l̥]. Devoiced /j/ is additionally confused with /ʃ/.
- In some dialects, the first consonant in almost any consonant cluster becomes [h].
- Some dialects have productive lenition of obstruents into their voiced counterparts between vowels.
- The nasals are normally assimilated to the place of articulation of a following consonant.
- The voiceless alveolar lateral affricate [t͡ɬ] is assimilated after /l/ and pronounced [l].

=== Phonotactics ===
Classical Nahuatl and most of the modern varieties have fairly simple phonological systems. They allow only syllables with maximally one initial and one final consonant. Consonant clusters occur only word-medially and over syllable boundaries. Some morphemes have two alternating forms: one with a vowel i to prevent consonant clusters and one without it. For example, the absolutive suffix has the variant forms -tli (used after consonants) and -tl (used after vowels). Some modern varieties, however, have formed complex clusters from vowel loss. Others have contracted syllable sequences, causing accents to shift or vowels to become long. (Note: Sischo 1979, p. 312 and Canger 2000 for a brief description of these phenomena in Michoacán and Durango Nahuatl, respectively.)

=== Stress ===
Most Nahuatl dialects have stress on the penultimate syllable of a word. In Mexicanero from Durango, many unstressed syllables have disappeared from words, and the placement of syllable stress has become phonemic.

== Writing and literature ==
=== Writing ===
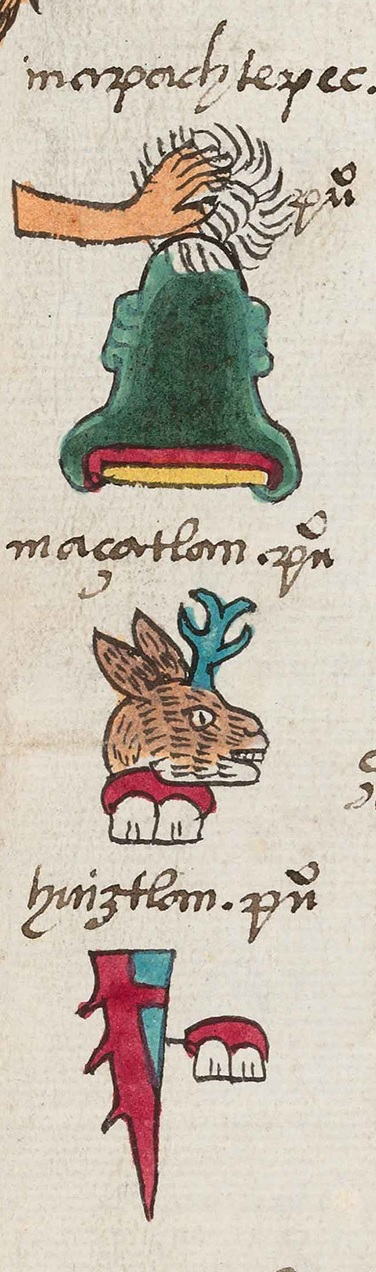
The place names Mapachtepec ('Raccoon Hill'), Mazatlan ('Deer Place') and Huitztlan ('Thorn Place') written in the Aztec writing system, from the Codex Mendoza

Traditionally, Pre-Columbian Aztec writing has not been considered a true writing system, since it did not represent the full vocabulary of a spoken language in the way that the writing systems of the Old World or the Maya Script did. Therefore, generally Aztec writing was not meant to be read, but to be told. The elaborate codices were essentially pictographic aids for memorizing texts, which include genealogies, astronomical information, and tribute lists. Three kinds of signs were used in the system: pictures used as mnemonics (which do not represent particular words), logograms which represent whole words (instead of phonemes or syllables), and logograms used only for their sound values (i.e. according to the rebus principle).

However, epigrapher Alfonso Lacadena has argued that by the eve of the Spanish invasion, one school of Nahua scribes, those of Tetzcoco, had developed a fully syllabic script which could represent spoken language phonetically in the same way that the Maya script did. Some other epigraphers have questioned the claim, arguing that although the syllabicity was clearly extant in some early colonial manuscripts (hardly any pre-Columbian manuscripts have survived), this could be interpreted as a local innovation inspired by Spanish literacy rather than a continuation of a pre-Columbian practice.

The Spanish introduced the Latin script, which was used to record a large body of Aztec prose, poetry and mundane documentation such as testaments, administrative documents, legal letters, etc. In a matter of decades pictorial writing was completely replaced with the Latin alphabet. No standardized Latin orthography has been developed for Nahuatl, and no general consensus has arisen for the representation of many sounds in Nahuatl that are lacking in Spanish, such as long vowels and the glottal stop. The orthography most accurately representing the phonemes of Nahuatl was developed in the 17th century by the Jesuit Horacio Carochi, building on the insights of another Jesuit, Antonio del Rincon. Carochi's orthography used two different diacritics: a macron to represent long vowels and a grave for the saltillo, and sometimes an acute accent for short vowels. This orthography did not achieve a wide following outside of the Jesuit community.

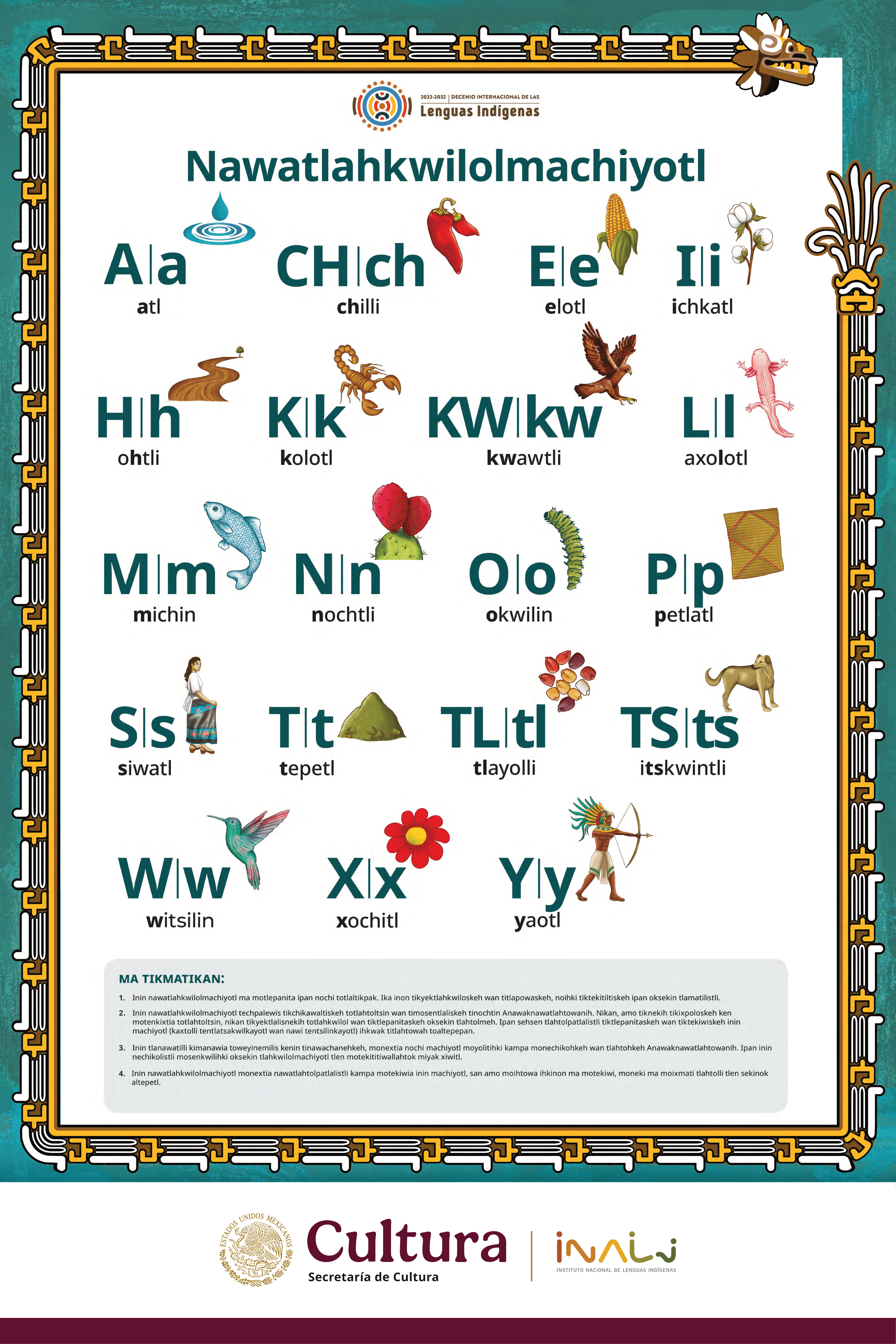
Illustrated Nahuatl alphabet

When Nahuatl became the subject of focused linguistic studies in the 20th century, linguists acknowledged the need to represent all the phonemes of the language. Several practical orthographies were developed to transcribe the language, many using the Americanist transcription system. With the establishment of Mexico's Instituto Nacional de Lenguas Indígenas in 2004, new attempts to create standardized orthographies for the different dialects were resumed; however to this day there is no single official orthography for Nahuatl. Apart from dialectal differences, major issues in transcribing Nahuatl include:

- whether to follow Spanish orthographic practice and write /k/ with c and qu, /kʷ/ with cu and uc, /s/ with c and z, or s, and /w/ with hu and uh, or u.
- how to write the saltillo phoneme (in some dialects pronounced as a glottal stop [ʔ] and in others as an [h]), which has been spelled with j, h, ꞌ (apostrophe), or a grave accent on the preceding vowel, but which traditionally has often been omitted in writing.
- whether and how to represent vowel length, e.g. by double vowels or by the use of macrons.

In 2018, Nahua peoples from 16 states in the country began collaborating with INALI creating a new modern orthography called Yankwiktlahkwilolli, designed to be the standardized orthography of Nahuatl in the coming years. The modern writing has much greater use in the modern variants than in the classic variant, since the texts, documents and literary works of the time usually use the Jesuit one.

Nahuatl Orthographies
Analytic/Hasler/Aztec Congress	Carochi/Andrews	SEP/SIL	Carochi/Launey	Colonial	Intuitive
w	hu-/-uh	u	hu-/-uh	hu, uh, o, u	gua/guo/güe/ güi, -uh, u
k	qui/que, ca/co	k, qui/que/ca/co	qui/que, ca/co	qui/que, ca/co	k, qu
s	ci/ce/za/zo	s	ci/ce/za/zo	ci/ce/za/zo, ç	s, z, c
h/'	h	j, '	é, ê	-	j, h
x	x	x	x	x, s	x, sh
-	ē	ee/-	ē	-	-

=== Literature ===
Among the Indigenous languages of the Americas, the extensive corpus of surviving literature in Nahuatl dating as far back as the 16th century may be considered unique. Nahuatl literature encompasses a diverse array of genres and styles, the documents themselves composed under many different circumstances. Preconquest Nahua had a distinction between tlahtolli 'speech' and second cuicatl 'song', akin to the distinction between prose and poetry.

Nahuatl tlahtolli prose has been preserved in different forms. Annals and chronicles recount history, normally written from the perspective of a particular altepetl (local polity) and often combining mythical accounts with real events. Important works in this genre include those from Chalco written by Chimalpahin, from Tlaxcala by Diego Muñoz Camargo, from Mexico-Tenochtitlan by Fernando Alvarado Tezozomoc and those of Texcoco by Fernando Alva Ixtlilxochitl. Many annals recount history year-by-year and are normally written by anonymous authors. These works are sometimes evidently based on pre-Columbian pictorial year counts that existed, such as the Cuauhtitlan annals and the Anales de Tlatelolco. Purely mythological narratives are also found, like the "Legend of the Five Suns", the Aztec creation myth recounted in Codex Chimalpopoca.

One of the most important works of prose written in Nahuatl is the twelve-volume compilation generally known as the Florentine Codex, authored in the mid-16th century by the Franciscan missionary Bernardino de Sahagún and a number of Nahua speakers. With this work Sahagún bestowed an enormous ethnographic description of the Nahua, written in side-by-side translations of Nahuatl and Spanish and illustrated throughout by color plates drawn by Indigenous painters. Its volumes cover a diverse range of topics: Aztec history, material culture, social organization, religious and ceremonial life, rhetorical style and metaphors. The twelfth volume provides an Indigenous perspective on the conquest. Sahagún also made a point of trying to document the richness of the Nahuatl language, stating:

This work is like a dragnet to bring to light all the words of this language with their exact and metaphorical meanings, and all their ways of speaking, and most of their practices good and evil.

Nahuatl poetry is principally preserved in two sources: the Cantares Mexicanos and the Romances de los señores de Nueva España, both collections of Aztec songs written down in the 16th and 17th centuries. Some songs may have been preserved through oral tradition from pre-conquest times until the time of their writing, for example the songs attributed to the poet-king of Texcoco, Nezahualcoyotl. Karttunen and Lockhart identify more than four distinct styles of songs, e.g. the icnocuicatl ('sad song'), the xopancuicatl ('song of spring'), melahuaccuicatl ('plain song') and yaocuicatl ('song of war'), each with distinct stylistic traits. Aztec poetry makes rich use of metaphoric imagery and themes and are lamentation of the brevity of human existence, the celebration of valiant warriors who die in battle, and the appreciation of the beauty of life.

=== Stylistics ===
The Aztecs distinguished between at least two social registers of language: the language of commoners (macehuallahtolli) and the language of the nobility (tecpillahtolli). The latter was marked by the use of a distinct rhetorical style. Since literacy was confined mainly to these higher social classes, most of the existing prose and poetical documents were written in this style. An important feature of this high rhetorical style of formal oratory was the use of parallelism, whereby the orator structured their speech in couplets consisting of two parallel phrases. For example:

- ye maca timiquican
- 'May we not die'
- ye maca tipolihuican
- 'May we not perish'

Another kind of parallelism used is referred to by modern linguists as difrasismo, in which two phrases are symbolically combined to give a metaphorical reading. Classical Nahuatl was rich in such diphrasal metaphors, many of which are explicated by Sahagún in the Florentine Codex and by Andrés de Olmos in his Arte. Such difrasismos include:

- in xochitl, in cuicatl
- 'The flower, the song' – meaning 'poetry'
- in cuitlapilli, in atlapalli
- 'the tail, the wing' – meaning 'the common people'
- in toptli, in petlacalli
- 'the chest, the box' – meaning 'something secret'
- in yollohtli, in eztli
- 'the heart, the blood' – meaning 'cacao'
- in iztlactli, in tencualactli
- 'the drool, the spittle' – meaning 'lies'

== Morphology and syntax ==
The Nahuatl languages are polysynthetic and agglutinative, making extensive use of compounding, incorporation and derivation. Various prefixes and suffixes can be added to a root to form very long words—individual Nahuatl words can constitute an entire sentence.

Nahuatl displays nominative–accusative alignment, and transitive verbs thus take distinct a set of prefixes which mark their objects. The following verb shows how the verb is marked for agent, patient, recipient, and theme:

ni- mits- teː- tla- makiː -lti -s
I- you- someone- something- give -CAUS -FUT
"I shall make somebody give something to you" (Note: All examples given in this section and these subsections are from Suárez 1983, pp. 61–63 unless otherwise noted. Glosses have been standardized.) (Classical Nahuatl)

=== Nouns ===
The Nahuatl noun has a relatively complex structure. The only obligatory inflections are for number (singular and plural) and possession (whether the noun is possessed, as is indicated by a prefix meaning 'my', 'your', etc.). Nahuatl has neither case nor gender, but Classical Nahuatl and some modern dialects distinguish between animate and inanimate nouns. In Classical Nahuatl the animacy distinction manifested with respect to pluralization, as only animate nouns could take a plural form, and all inanimate nouns were uncountable (as the words bread and money are uncountable in English). Now, many speakers do not maintain this distinction and all nouns may take the plural inflection. One dialect, that of the Eastern Huasteca, has a distinction between two different plural suffixes for animate and inanimate nouns.

In most varieties of Nahuatl, nouns in the unpossessed singular form generally take an absolutive suffix. The most common forms of the absolutive are -tl after vowels, -tli after consonants other than l, and -li after l. Nouns that take the plural usually form the plural by adding one of the plural absolutive suffixes -tin or -meh, but some plural forms are irregular or formed by reduplication. Some nouns have competing plural forms.

Singular noun:

kojo -tl
coyote -ABS
"coyote" (Classical Nahuatl)

Plural animate noun:

kojo -meʔ
coyote -PL
"coyotes" (Classical Nahuatl)

Plural animate noun with reduplication:

/koː~kojo-ʔ/
PL~coyote-PL
"coyotes" (Classical Nahuatl)

Nahuatl distinguishes between possessed and unpossessed forms of nouns. The absolutive suffix is not used on possessed nouns. In all dialects, possessed nouns take a prefix agreeing with number and person of its possessor. Possessed plural nouns take the ending -/waːn/.

Absolutive noun:

kal -li
house -ABS
"house" (Classical Nahuatl)

Possessed noun:

no- kal
my- house
"my house" (Classical Nahuatl)

Possessed plural:

no- kal -waːn
my- house -PL
"my houses" (Classical Nahuatl)

Nahuatl does not have grammatical case but uses what is sometimes called a relational noun to describe spatial (and other) relations. These morphemes cannot appear alone but must occur after a noun or a possessive prefix. They are also often called postpositions or locative suffixes. In some ways these locative constructions resemble and can be thought of as locative case constructions. Most modern dialects have incorporated prepositions from Spanish that are competing with or that have completely replaced relational nouns.

Uses of relational noun/postposition/locative -pan with a possessive prefix:

no-pan
my-in/on
"in/on me" (Classical Nahuatl)

iː-pan
its-in/on
"in/on it" (Classical Nahuatl)

iː-pan kal-li
its-in house-ABS
"in the house" (Classical Nahuatl)

Use with a preceding noun stem:

kal-pan
house-in
"in the house" (Classical Nahuatl)

Noun compounds are commonly formed by combining two or more nominal stems or combining a nominal stem with an adjectival or verbal stem.

=== Pronouns ===
Nahuatl generally distinguishes three persons, both in the singular and plural numbers. In at least one modern dialect, the Isthmus-Mecayapan variety, there has come to be a distinction between inclusive ("us, including you") and exclusive ("us, but not you") forms of the first person plural:

First person plural pronoun in Classical Nahuatl:

- tewaːntin 'we'

First person plural pronouns in Isthmus-Mecayapan Nahuat:

- nejamēn ([nehameːn]) 'We, but not you' (= me & them)
- tejamēn ([tehameːn]) 'We along with you' (= me & you & them)

Much more common is an honorific/non-honorific distinction, usually applied to second and third persons but not first.

Non-honorific forms:

- ˈtewaːtl "you sg."
- ameˈwaːnt͡sin "you pl."
- ˈyewatl "he/she/it"

Honorific forms

- teˈwaːt͡sin "you sg. honorific"
- amewaːnˈt͡sit͡sin "you pl. honorific"
- yeˈwaːt͡sin "he/she honorific"

=== Numerals ===
Nahuatl has a vigesimal (base-20) numbering system. The base values are cempōhualli (1 × 20), centzontli (1 × 400), cenxiquipilli (1 × 8,000), cempōhualxiquipilli (1 × 20 × 8,000 = 160,000), centzonxiquipilli (1 × 400 × 8,000 = 3,200,000) and cempōhualtzonxiquipilli (1 × 20 × 400 × 8,000 = 64,000,000). The ce(n/m) prefix at the beginning means 'one' (as in 'one hundred' and 'one thousand') and is replaced with the corresponding number to get the names of other multiples of the power. For example, ome (2) × pōhualli (20) = ompōhualli (40), ome (2) × tzontli (400) = ontzontli (800). The -li in pōhualli (and xiquipilli) and the -tli in tzontli are grammatical noun suffixes that are appended only at the end of the word; thus pōhualli, tzontli and xiquipilli compound together as pōhualtzonxiquipilli.

=== Verbs ===
The Nahuatl verb is quite complex and inflects for many grammatical categories. The verb is composed of a root, prefixes, and suffixes. The prefixes indicate the person of the subject, and person and number of the object and indirect object, whereas the suffixes indicate tense, aspect, mood and subject number.

Most Nahuatl dialects distinguish three tenses: present, past, and future, and two aspects: perfective and imperfective. Some varieties add progressive or habitual aspects. Many dialects distinguish at least the indicative and imperative moods, and some also have optative and prohibitive moods.

Most Nahuatl varieties have a number of ways to alter the valency of a verb. Classical Nahuatl had a passive voice (also sometimes defined as an impersonal voice), but this is not found in most modern varieties. However the applicative and causative voices are found in many modern dialects. Many Nahuatl varieties also allow forming verbal compounds with two or more verbal roots.

The following verbal form has two verbal roots and is inflected for causative voice and both a direct and indirect object:

ni- kin- tla- kwa- ltiː- s- neki
I- them- something- eat- CAUS- FUT- want
"I want to feed them" (Classical Nahuatl)

Some Nahuatl varieties, notably Classical Nahuatl, can inflect the verb to show the direction of the verbal action going away from or towards the speaker. Some also have specific inflectional categories showing purpose and direction and such complex notions as "to go in order to" or "to come in order to", "go, do and return", "do while going", "do while coming", "do upon arrival", or "go around doing".

Classical Nahuatl and many modern dialects have grammaticalised ways to express politeness towards addressees or even towards people or things that are being mentioned, by using special verb forms and special "honorific suffixes".

Familiar verbal form:

ti-mo-tlaːlo-a
you-yourself-run-PRS
"you run" (Classical Nahuatl)

Honorific verbal form:

ti-mo-tlaːlo-tsino-a
you-yourself-run-HON-PRS
"You run" (said with respect) (Classical Nahuatl)

=== Reduplication ===
Many varieties of Nahuatl have productive reduplication. By reduplicating the first syllable of a root a new word is formed. In nouns this is often used to form plurals, e.g. /tlaːkatl/ 'man' → /tlaːtlaːkah/ 'men', but also in some varieties to form diminutives, honorifics, or for derivations. In verbs reduplication is often used to form a reiterative meaning (i.e. expressing repetition), for example in Nahuatl of Tezcoco:

- /wetsi/ 'he/she falls'
- /we:-wetsi/ 'he/she falls several times'
- /weʔ-wetsi-ʔ/ 'they fall (many people)'

=== Syntax ===
Some linguists have argued that Nahuatl displays the properties of a non-configurational language, meaning that word order in Nahuatl is basically free. Nahuatl allows all possible orderings of the three basic sentence constituents. It is prolifically a pro-drop language: it allows sentences with omission of all noun phrases or independent pronouns, not just of noun phrases or pronouns whose function is the sentence subject. In most varieties independent pronouns are used only for emphasis. It allows certain kinds of syntactically discontinuous expressions.

Michel Launey argues that Classical Nahuatl had a verb-initial basic word order with extensive freedom for variation, which was then used to encode pragmatic functions such as focus and topicality. The same has been argued for some contemporary varieties.

newal no-nobia
I my-fiancée
"My fiancée" (and not anyone else's) (Michoacán Nahuatl)

It has been argued, most prominently by the linguist Michel Launey, that Classical Nahuatl syntax is best characterised by "omnipredicativity", meaning that any noun or verb in the language is in fact a full predicative sentence. This interpretation aims to account for some of the language's peculiarities, for example, why nouns must also carry the same agreement prefixes as verbs, and why predicates do not require any noun phrases to function as their arguments. For example, the verbal form tzahtzi means 'he/she/it shouts', and with the second person prefix titzahtzi it means 'you shout'. Nouns are inflected in the same way: the noun conētl means not just 'child', but also 'it is a child', and ticonētl means 'you are a child'. This prompts the omnipredicative interpretation, which posits that all nouns are also predicates. According to this interpretation, a phrase such as tzahtzi in conētl should not be interpreted as meaning just 'the child screams' but, rather, 'it screams, (the one that) is a child'.

== Vocabulary ==
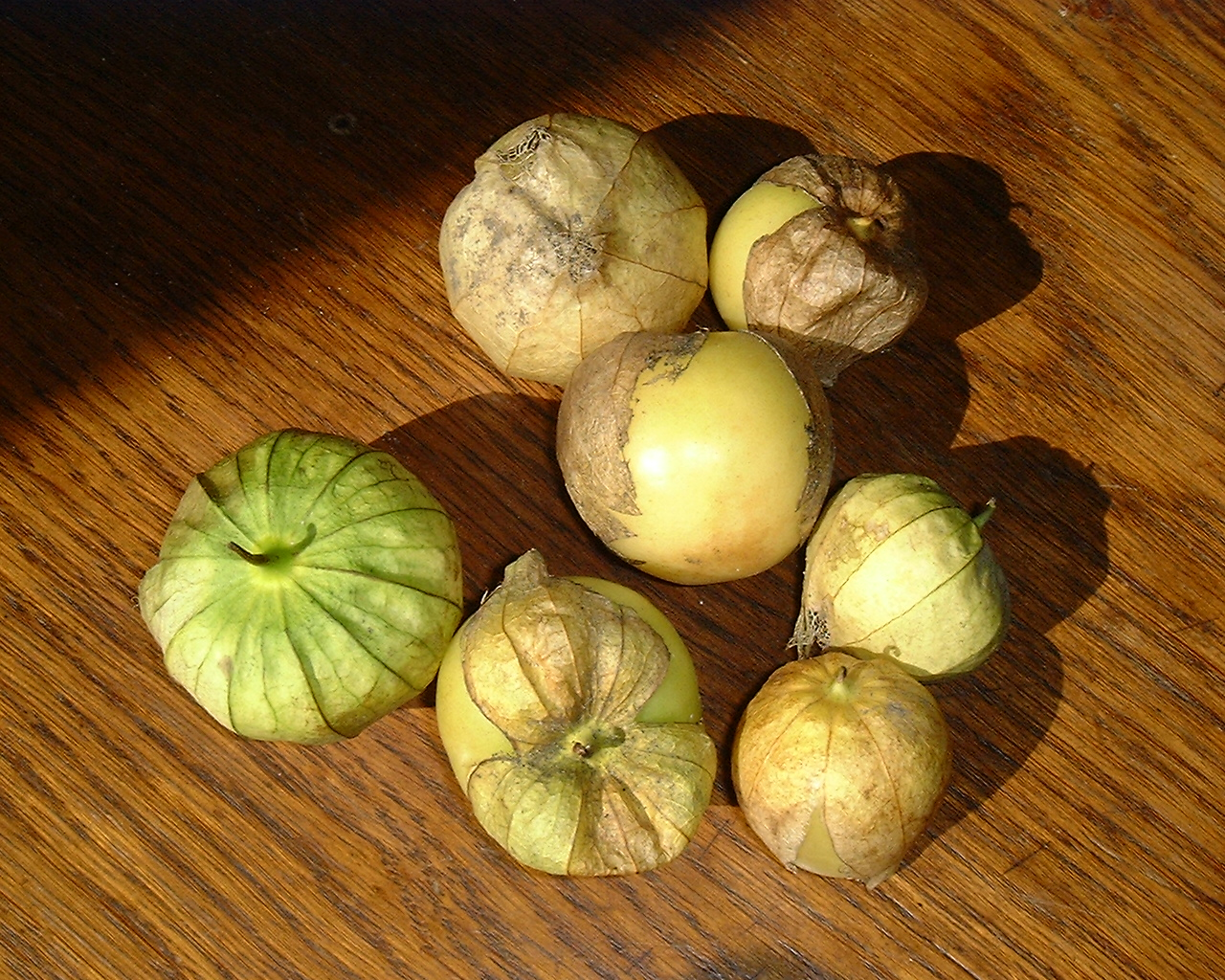
The Aztecs called (red) tomatoes xitōmatl, whereas the green tomatillo was called tōmatl; the latter is the source for the English word tomato.

Many Nahuatl words have been borrowed into the Spanish language, most of which are terms designating things Indigenous to the Americas. Some of these loans are restricted to Mexican or Central American Spanish, but others have entered all the varieties of Spanish in the world. A number of them, such as chocolate, tomato and avocado have made their way into many other languages via Spanish. Spanish colonial connections with the Philippines via the Manila-Acapulco galleon trade also left its trace in names of New World crops in Austronesian languages particularly Tagalog and Chamorro.

For instance, in English, two of the most prominent are undoubtedly chocolate (Note: While there is no real doubt that the word chocolate comes from Nahuatl, the commonly given Nahuatl etymology /ʃokolaːtl/ 'bitter water' no longer seems to be tenable. Dakin & Wichmann 2000 suggest the correct etymology to be /tʃikolaːtl/ – a word found in several modern Nahuatl dialects.) and tomato (from Nahuatl tōmatl). Other common words are coyote (from Nahuatl coyōtl), avocado (from Nahuatl āhuacatl) and chile or chili (from Nahuatl chilli). The word chicle is also derived from Nahuatl tzictli 'sticky stuff, chicle'. Some other English words from Nahuatl are: Aztec (from aztēcatl); cacao (from Nahuatl cacahuatl 'shell, rind'); ocelot (from ocēlotl). In Mexico many words for common everyday concepts attest to the close contact between Spanish and Nahuatl – so many in fact that entire dictionaries of mexicanismos (words particular to Mexican Spanish) have been published tracing Nahuatl etymologies, as well as Spanish words with origins in other Indigenous languages. Many well known toponyms also come from Nahuatl, including Mexico (from the Nahuatl word for the Aztec capital Mēxihco) and Guatemala (from Cuauhtēmallān). (Note: The Mexica used the word for the Kaqchikel capital Iximche in central Guatemala, but the word was extended to the entire zone in colonial times; see Carmack 1981, p. 143.)

== See also ==
- Vocabulario manual de las lenguas castellana y mexicana – a Spanish–Nahuatl dictionary
- Vocabulario trilingüe – dictionary of Spanish, Latin, and Nahuatl

== Notes ==
Indigenous languages of the Americas with Wikipedia
Item	Label/en	native label	Code	distribution map	number of speakers, writers, or signers	UNESCO language status	Ethnologue language status	?itemwiki
Q36806	Southern Quechua	qu:Urin Qichwa qu:Qhichwa qu:Qichwa	qu		6000000	2 vulnerable		Quechua Wikipedia
Q35876	Guarani	gn:Avañe'ẽ	gn		4850000	1 safe	1 National	Guarani Wikipedia
Q4627	Aymara	ay:Aymar aru	ay		4000000	2 vulnerable		Aymara Wikipedia
Q13300	Nahuatl	nah:Nawatlahtolli nah:nawatl nah:mexkatl	nah		1925620	2 vulnerable		Nahuatl Wikipedia
Q891085	Wayuu	guc:Wayuunaiki	guc		300000	2 vulnerable	5 Developing	Wayuu Wikipedia
Q33730	Mapudungun	arn:Mapudungun	arn		300000	3 definitely endangered	6b Threatened	Mapuche Wikipedia
Q13310	Navajo	nv:Diné bizaad nv:Diné	nv		169369	2 vulnerable	6b Threatened	Navajo Wikipedia
Q25355	Greenlandic	kl:Kalaallisut	kl		56200	2 vulnerable	1 National	Greenlandic Wikipedia
Q29921	Inuktitut	ike-cans:ᐃᓄᒃᑎᑐᑦ iu:Inuktitut	iu		39770	2 vulnerable		Inuktitut Wikipedia
Q33388	Cherokee	chr:ᏣᎳᎩ ᎧᏬᏂᎯᏍᏗ chr:ᏣᎳᎩ	chr		12300	4 severely endangered	8a Moribund	Cherokee Wikipedia
Q33390	Cree	cr:ᐃᔨᔨᐤ ᐊᔨᒧᐎᓐ' cr:nēhiyawēwin	cr		10875; 8040			Cree Wikipedia
Q32979	Choctaw	cho:Chahta anumpa cho:Chahta	cho		9200	2 vulnerable	6b Threatened	Choctaw Wikipedia
Q56590	Atikamekw	atj:Atikamekw Nehiromowin atj:Atikamekw	atj		6160	2 vulnerable	5 Developing	Atikamekw Wikipedia
Q27183	Iñupiaq	ik:Iñupiatun	ik		5580	4 severely endangered		Inupiat Wikipedia
Q523014	Muscogee	mus:Mvskoke	mus		4300	3 definitely endangered	7 Shifting	Muscogee Wikipedia
Q33265	Cheyenne	chy:Tsêhesenêstsestôtse	chy		2400	3 definitely endangered	8a Moribund	Cheyenne Wikipedia
