= Saltillo (linguistics) =

Consonant in Mexican linguistics

- Ꞌ ꞌ

Usage
- Writing system: Latin
- Type: alphabetic

History
- Time period: unknown to present

In Mexican linguistics, the saltillo (Spanish, meaning "little skip") is a glottal stop consonant (IPA: [ʔ]). The name was given by the early grammarians of Classical Nahuatl. In a number of other Nahuan languages, the sound cognate to the glottal stop of Classical Nahuatl is [h], and the term saltillo is also applied to that cognate for historical reasons. The saltillo, in both capital and small letter versions, appears in Unicode (in the Latin Extended-D block), but is often written with an apostrophe; it is sometimes written ⟨h⟩ (for either pronunciation), or as ⟨j⟩ when the saltillo is pronounced [h]. The spelling of the glottal stop with an apostrophe-like character most likely originates from transliterations of the Arabic hamza. It has also been written with a grave accent over the preceding vowel in some Nahuatl works, following Horacio Carochi (1645).

A glottal stop exists as a phoneme in many other indigenous languages of the Americas and its presence or absence can distinguish one word from another. However, there is no glottal stop in Standard Spanish, so the sound is often imperceptible to Spanish speakers, and Spanish writers usually did not write it when transcribing Mexican languages: Nahuatl [ˈtɬeko] "in a fire" and [ˈtɬeʔko] "he ascends" were both typically written tleco, for example. Where glottal stop is distinguished, the latter may be written tlehco or tleꞌko.

== The saltillo letter ==
Although in Spanish the word saltillo refers to the sound made by the glottal stop, it is often applied to the letter used to write that sound, especially the straight apostrophe, and this is the usual meaning of saltillo in English. The alphabet of the Tlapanec language (Me̱ꞌpha̱a̱) uses both uppercase and lowercase saltillos, ⟨Ꞌ ꞌ⟩. Other languages, such as Rapa Nui, use only a lowercase saltillo, and capitalize the first vowel of the word rather than capitalizing the glottal stop. Unicode support of the cased forms began with Unicode 5.1, with U+A78B Ꞌ LATIN CAPITAL LETTER SALTILLO and U+A78C ꞌ LATIN SMALL LETTER SALTILLO. Both are typically rendered with a straight apostrophe-like shape sometimes described as a dotless exclamation point. Typesetters who are unfamiliar with Unicode frequently use an apostrophe instead, but that can cause problems in electronic files because the apostrophe is a punctuation mark, not a word-building character, and the ambiguous use of apostrophe for two different functions can make automated processing of the text difficult.

The lowercase saltillo letter is used in the Rapa Nui language of Chile and in at least one Southeast Asian language, Central Sinama of the Philippines and Malaysia. In the latter it represents both the glottal stop and the centralized vowel [ə] and derives from the historical use of hamza for those sounds in Arabic script. Examples are bowaꞌ 'mouth' as a consonant and nsꞌllan 'oil' as a vowel.

== See also ==
- ʻOkina
- Hamza
- Glottal stop
