= Lisa Sousa =

American academic historian (born 1962)

Lisa Sousa (born 21 November 1962) is an American academic historian active in the field of Latin American studies. A specialist in the colonial-era history of Latin America and of Colonial Mexico in particular, Sousa is noted for her research, commentary, and translations of colonial Mesoamerican literature and Nahuatl-language historical texts. She has also published research on historical and contemporary indigenous peoples in Mexico, the roles of women in indigenous societies and cultural definitions of gender. Sousa is a full professor in the History Department at Occidental College in Los Angeles, California.

== Studies and career ==
Lisa Sousa was born 1962 in Sebastopol, California. She attended the University of California, Los Angeles (UCLA) as an undergraduate, completing a B.A. in Latin American studies in 1990. Her postgraduate studies in Latin American history were also undertaken at UCLA, where her research focused on the history and experience of women and indigenous cultures in colonial-era Mexico.

Sousa first completed her Master's degree in 1992 before entering the doctorate studies program, and was awarded her PhD in 1998. Her doctoral dissertation, "Women in Native Societies and Cultures of Colonial Mexico", won UCLA's Mary Wollstonecraft Dissertation Award for the best thesis in Women's studies.

As her PhD was being completed, Sousa obtained a position as adjunct professor at Occidental College in the 1997–98 academic year. After a brief term as a visiting lecturer at UCLA, Sousa took up an assistant professorship at Occidental, from 1998 onwards. In addition to her continuing research and publications in the field, Sousa teaches a number of related courses in Latin American history, Mesoamerican literature and gender studies, and also provides instruction in learning Nahuatl.

At Occidental, Sousa was awarded the prestigious Graham L. Sterling Memorial Award, established in 1972 to recognize a faculty member with a distinguished record of teaching, service and professional achievement.

== Research ==
During the course of her studies at UCLA Sousa obtained a proficiency in Classical Nahuatl, an indigenous language of the central Mexican altiplano and lingua franca of the Aztec Empire at the time of the Spanish conquest in the 16th century.

While studying at UCLA in the 1990s Sousa researched and published papers on a themes relating to women and gender among indigenous cultures in Mexico. Themes analysed by Sousa include rationalisation of and attitudes to violence against women, the representation and participation of women in crime and colonial-era rebellion, and slavery of indigenous groups in the New World. Her publications and seminars also explore the nature of gender roles in Mesoamerican cultures, particularly among Nahua, Mixtec and Zapotec peoples of the pre- and post-conquest eras.

In 1998 as her PhD was being completed, Sousa co-edited and translated an English-language edition of the Huei tlamahuiçoltica, a 17th-century Nahuatl-language manuscript that is central to the claims of the Guadalupan apparition to Juan Diego. The book, The Story of Guadalupe: Luis Laso de la Vega's Huei tlamahuiçoltica of 1649, jointly published by Stanford University Press and UCLA's Latin American Center, also contains analysis of and translated excerpts from the 1648 document, Imagen de la Virgen María, Madre de Dios de Guadalupe by Miguel Sánchez. Together with her collaborators Stafford Poole and James Lockhart, Sousa affirms that Luis Laso de la Vega was indeed the principal author of the Huei tlamahuiçoltica, and that portions of the work bear affinities with Sánchez's document. They regard Sánchez's Imagen de la Virgen María as the earliest known written account of the Guadalupan apparition, and that consequently these two mid-17th-century texts are the principal origins of the apparition story, and not any earlier source or tradition contemporaneous with the events purported to have taken place more than a century before those documents were written.

In 2004, Sousa and UCLA professor Kevin Terraciano were presented with the Robert F. Heizer Article Award by the American Society for Ethnohistory, for their co-authored paper "The 'Original Conquest' of Oaxaca: Nahua and Mixtec Accounts of the Spanish Conquest", published the preceding year in the journal Ethnohistory.

In 2005 Sousa co-edited with Matthew Restall and Terraciano a volume of translated colonial-era Nahuatl-, Mayan- and Mixtec-language primary source texts, under the title Mesoamerican Voices: Native-Language Writings from Colonial Mexico and Guatemala.

In 2017, Sousa published a book, The Woman Who Turned Into a Jaguar, and Other Narratives of Native Women in Archives of Colonial Mexico (Stanford University Press). The book is a social and cultural history of gender relations among indigenous peoples of New Spain, focusing on four native groups in highland Mexico―the Nahua, Mixtec, Zapotec, and Mixe―tracing cross-cultural similarities and differences in the roles and status attributed to women in prehispanic and colonial Mesoamerica. The book won wide praise among reviewers and was awarded both the American Historical Associations 2018 Friedrich Katz Prize in Latin American and Caribbean History and the American Society for Ethnohistory’s Erminie Wheeler-Voegelin Prize for the year’s best book of ethnohistory.

In the 2017-2018 academic year, Sousa was selected as one of 40 Getty Center Scholars-in-Residence for 2017-18. The academics and artists will work on a range of topics at the Getty Center on the theme of "Iconoclasm and Vandalism."
