= Miguel Sanchez =

Miguel Sánchez may refer to:

- Miguel Sánchez (priest) (1594–1674), Novohispanic priest, writer and theologian
- Miguel Ángel Sánchez (Argentine footballer) (1936–2008)
- Miguel A. Sanchez, Spanish-American pathologist
- Miguel Ángel Sánchez (cyclist) (born 1943), Costa Rican Olympic cyclist
- Miguel Sánchez Carreño (born 1948), Mexican politician
- Miguel Sánchez-Ostiz (born 1950), Spanish writer
- Míchel (footballer, born 1975) (Miguel Ángel Sánchez Muñoz), Spanish footballer
- Julian Sanchez (writer) (Miguel Julian Sanchez, born 1979), American journalist
- Miguel Ángel Sánchez (Nicaraguan footballer) (born 1980), Nicaraguan footballer
- Miguel Sánchez Rincón (born 1988), Mexican footballer
- Miguel Sánchez (baseball) (born 1993), Dominican baseball player
- Miguel Sánchez-Migallón (born 1995), Spanish handball player
- Miguel Sánchez López, Spanish lawyer, criminologist and politician

== See also ==
- Miguel Angel Sanchez (disambiguation)
- Michael Sanchez (disambiguation)
- Mike Sanchez (Jesus Miguel Sanchez, born 1964), British musician
- Lionel Hutz, a recurring character on The Simpsons who used the name as an alias.
