= Huei tlamahuiçoltica =

1649 religious tract by Luis Laso de la Vega

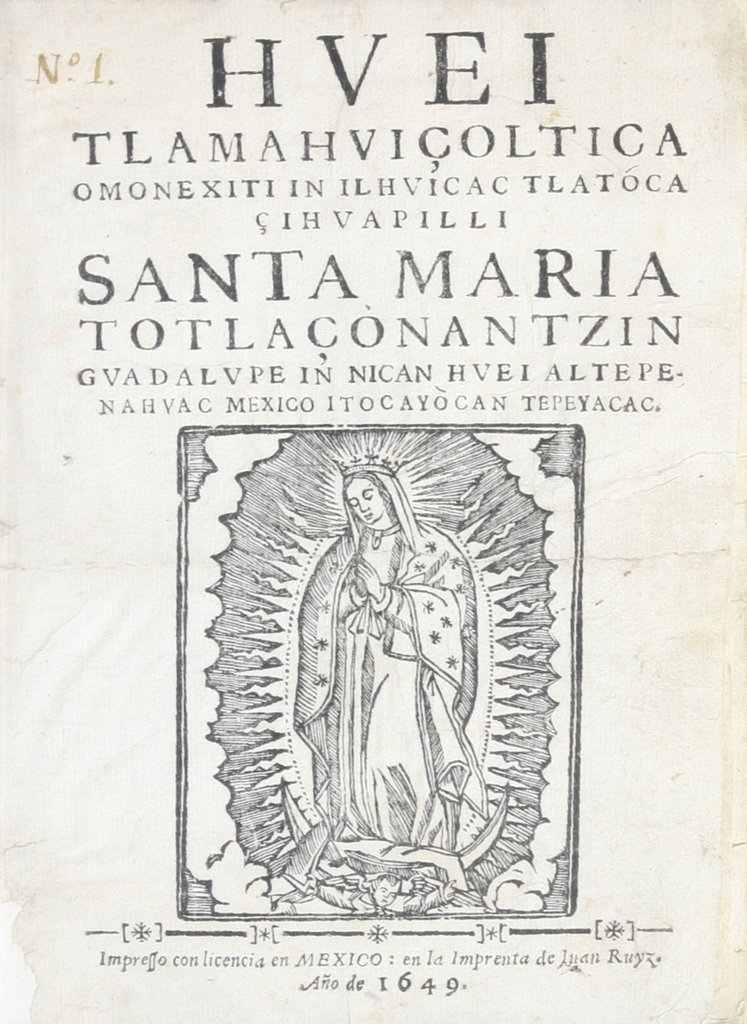
The first page of the Huei Tlamahuiçoltica

Huei Tlamahuiçoltica ("The Great Event") is a tract in Nahuatl comprising 36 pages and was published in Mexico City, Mexico, in 1649 by Luis Laso de la Vega, the vicar of the chapel of Our Lady of Guadalupe at Tepeyac outside the same city. In the preface Luis Laso de la Vega claimed authorship of the whole work, but this claim is the subject of an ongoing difference of scholarly opinion.

The tract is written almost entirely in Nahuatl and includes the Nican Mopohua, which narrates the Marian apparitions of Our Lady of Guadalupe at Tepeyac in 1531. It also includes the Nican Motecpana, which enumerates the miracles attributed by some to Fernando de Alva Ixtlilxóchitl; Luis Laso de la Vega does not mention either him or Antonio Valeriano as authors.

The traditions recounted in the 1649 tract were first published in the Spanish book Imagen de la Virgen María, Madre de Dios de Guadalupe ("Image of the Virgin Mary, Mother of God of Guadalupe"), written by Miguel Sánchez in 1648 and being a theological dissertation linking the Guadalupan Image to Revelation 12:1.

There is an equally contentious and much shorter manuscript in Nahuatl preceding the Nican Mopohua, which is titled the Inin Huey Tlamahuiçoltzin ("This Is the Great Marvel"), also known as "The Primitive Relation" of the apparitions. It is in The National Library of México.

== Sections ==
=== Preface ===
The first section, a preface, is titled in Nahuatl "Noble Queen of Heaven, Forever Virgin, Mother of God". In it Lasso addresses the Virgin directly, and after an introduction of four to five lines proceeds to the reason why he took up Nahuatl in order to publish the history of the apparitions:

- "You yourself spoke in Nahuatl to a poor Indian and painted yourself in his ayate, thus showing you are not displeased with many languages".
- "That the Indians of this land remember and keep in their language all you did for them and how it happened".
- "Christ on the Cross had His sentence in three languages".
- "You were with the apostles in Pentecost to receive the Holy Spirit" (a remembrance of the miracle of Diaspora Jews understanding each in his own language Acts 2:1–6)

The preface ends with a short prayer in two lines pleading the Virgin's intercession for the assistance of the Holy Spirit in writing in Nahuatl.

=== Nican Mopohua ===
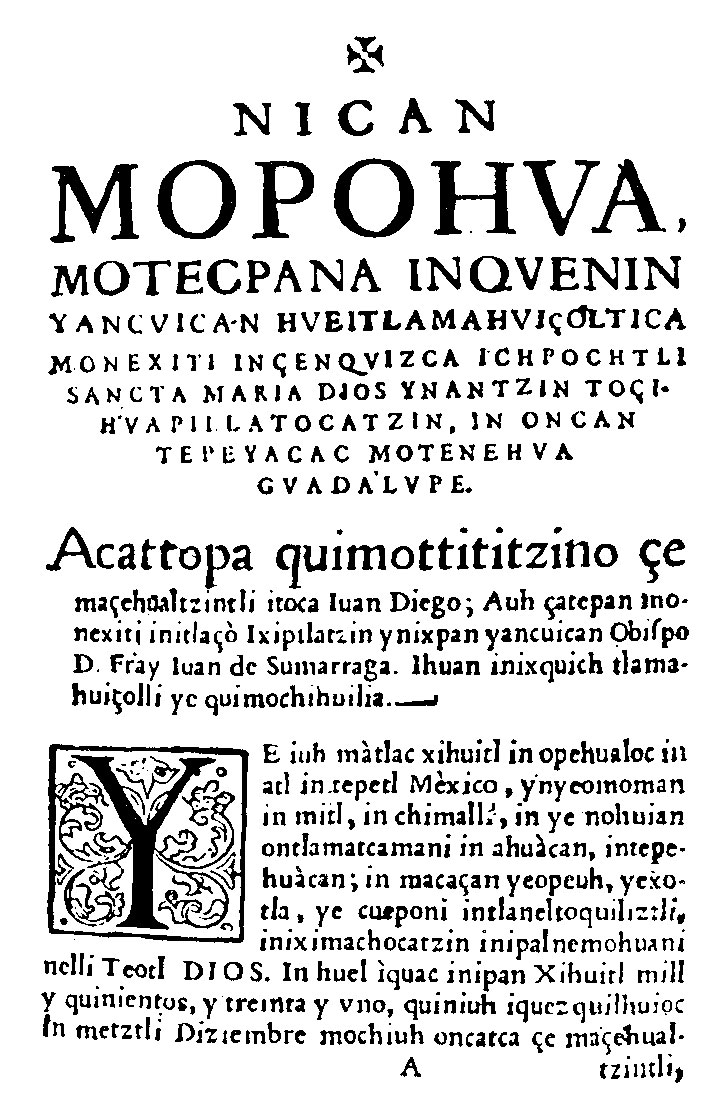
The first page of the Nican Mopohua

The second section, the Nican Mopohua ("Here Is Recounted") constitutes the narrative in Nahuatl of the apparitions, including the Virgin's apparition to St. Juan Diego's uncle Juan Bernardino. It is probable that the Nahuatl manuscript used by Lasso was the original by Valeriano, which is presently in the New York Public Library. Most authorities, including Edmundo O'Gorman, agree on this and on the dating of its authorship, namely c. 1556.

==== Content, style, and structure ====
The Nican Mopohua, which has been described as "A Jewel of Nahuatl literature", whose beauty and depth of thought make it worthy of renown the world over, relies on the beauty of the dialogues between the Holy Virgin and St. Juan Diego to express the most tender feelings to be found in world literature. Her promise to grant the wishes of the locals who beseech her is prominent, as is her demand for a temple on the very spot.

The Nican Mopohua section by Valeriano of Lasso de la Vega's account is related in a poetic style, typical of the most elegant formal classical Nahuatl in its full beauty. The other parts are clearly different and with greater Spanish influence. The Nican Mopohua is unique for presenting a blending between the deepest Nahuatl thought with the Christian message. Scholar Richard Nebel insists that the Nican Mopohua is not necessarily a historical account, but a document designed to convert the Nahua and "bring about a state of harmony between different peoples, cultures, and religions, in order that, during a period of radical change, new possibilities of coexistence could be envisaged".

It is precisely on this point that a difference exists with other dialogues which invoke elements of the dramatic writings (called autos), many of which were used for the purposes of proselytization during the Spanish colonization of Mexico. The autos reflect only Spanish Christian thinking, while the main characteristic of the Nican Mopohua is the exceptional blending of the best of two cultures. Leon-Portilla suggests, "That there is in [the Nican Mopohua] an exposition of key ideas in Christian thinking, wrapped up in the language and form conceived from the world of the Nahua. It is without a doubt that this narrative seeks to demonstrate who God and the Virgin Mary are and that their relations are of kindness and protection for human beings." The emphasis on the beauty of a miraculous event as given by the Nican Mopohua can be contrasted with the account of Sánchez, which focuses primarily on the agreements between Indian accounts of the apparition and Biblical prophecy, most notably Revelation 12:1–2,14 and Revelation 21:2.

Because the apparition, and the purportedly miraculous transposition of the Virgin's image onto Diego's tilma ("mantle") of ayatl (ayate), i. e. maguey cloth, are largely credited with the conversion of the Native American Mexica (Aztecs) and other peoples of Mexico to Catholicism, all documents pertaining to the alleged miracle have been the subject of scrutiny by the Roman Catholic Church, the colonial Spanish Crown and after 1820 the Mexican government, scholars of Latin American religion and history, scholars of classical Nahuatl, and independent Guadalupanos, skeptics, and historians the world over.

==== Critical response ====
In authorizing the publication of the Huei tlamahuiuçoltica, in an "opinion" published as part of the front matter to the main text, Baltazar González, a Jesuit professor, Nahuatl speaker, and contemporary of Laso de la Vega, asserted that the Huei tlamahuiuçoltica "...agrees with what is known of the facts from tradition and the annals."

Some contemporary scholars have written skeptical or critical texts about the origin of the image and the texts. Sousa, Poole and Lockhart, in their 1998 edition and translation, suggested that the most reasonable hypothesis was that Laso de la Vega's core narrative was based on Sánchez's earlier Image of the Virgin Mary, with an early 17th-century engraving by Samuel Stradanus as a secondary source. Today, Catholics, especially those in Mexico and the rest of Latin America, accept the Nican Mopohua, whether written by Laso de la Vega, Valeriano, or another, unknown author, as the primordial telling of the Virgin Mary's personal evangelism to the indigenous peoples of the Americas.

==== The Nican Mopohua and liberation theology ====
According to Cambridge professor of Mexican history David Brading, "...the romantic engagement with folk culture that characterized the revolutionary years was eventually taken up by the clergy. Equally important, the effect of the Second Vatican Council (1962–1965) and the rise of Liberation Theology was to convert the text into a potent catechetical instrument, since its emphasis on a poor peasant and his willing acceptance of the Virgin's message, not to mention [Bishop] Zumárraga's initial disdain, responded perfectly to the new-found 'option for the poor'."

=== Description of the image ===
The third section is a description of the image of the Virgin of Guadalupe as it was exhibited in the chapel of Tepeyac during Laso de la Vega's day.

=== "Nican Motecpana" ===
The fourth section, called the "Nican Motecpana" (Nahuatl: "Here is an ordered account"), relates the fourteen miracles ascribed to the image of the Virgin that remained stamped on Juan Diego's tilma after the apparition.

=== Biography of Juan Diego ===
The fifth section is a post-apparition biography of Juan Diego, detailing his pious life and devotion to the Virgin and her image.

=== "Nican Tlantica" ===
The sixth section, the "Nican Tlantica" (Nahuatl: "Here ends"), is a general history of the Virgin in New Spain and an exhortation to her devotion.

=== Final prayer ===
The seventh section is another prayer, this one following the structure of the Salve Regina.

== Publication and authorship ==
The responsibility for the composition and authorship of the Huei tlamahuiuçoltica is assigned by many contemporary Nahuatl scholars and historians to Luis Laso de la Vega, vicar of the chapel at Tepeyac. There is some possibility that Laso de la Vega had collaborators in the composition of the work, but there is insufficient material evidence to demonstrate whether one or more hands were involved in the construction of the Nahuatl-language text.

The work was initially published under the auspices of Dr. Pedro de Barrientos Lomelín, vicar general of the Mexican diocese, at the press of Juan Ruiz in 1649.

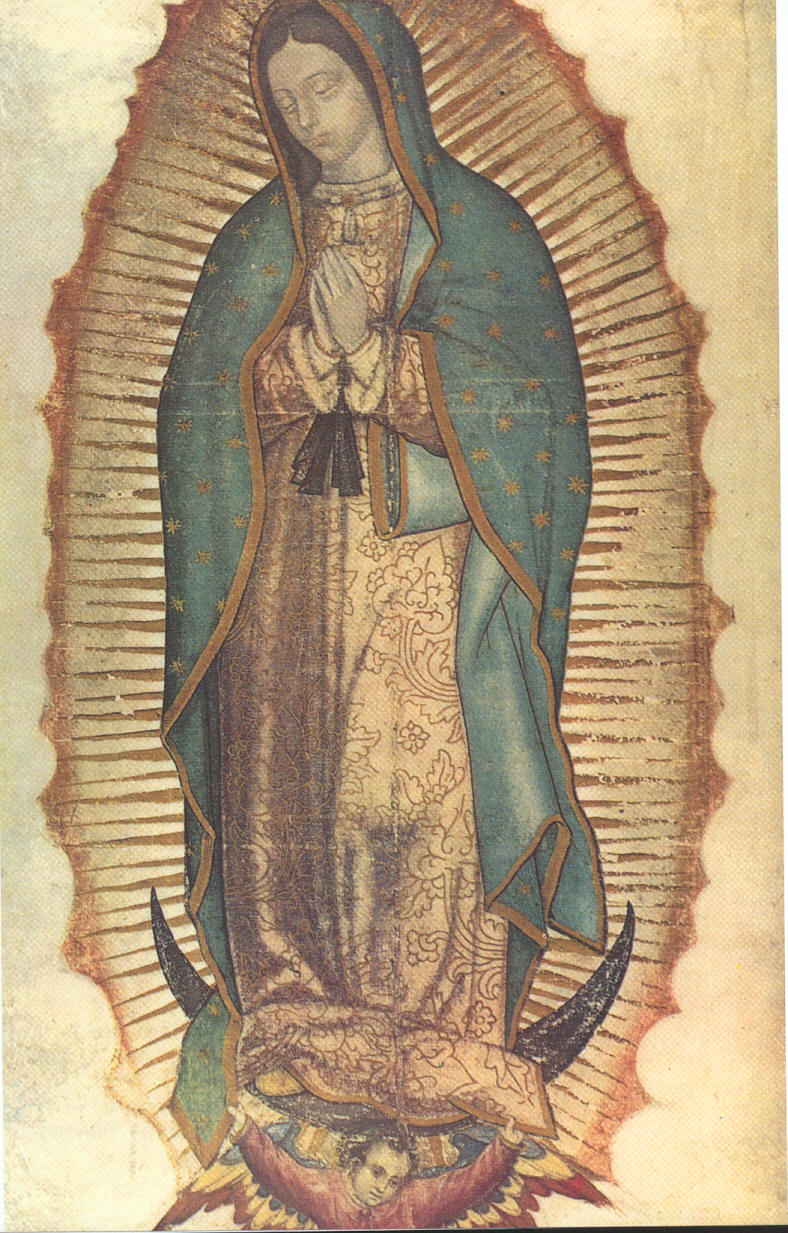
Our Lady of Guadalupe

In 1666, Lic. Luis Becerra Tanco (1603–1672), a secular priest, affirmed that the Nahuatl account was based on long-standing oral tradition in a deposition for the inquiries of Francisco de Siles, who was commissioned to compile documentation of the continuity of the Virgin's popular cult since the time of her apparition. Becerra Tanco later elaborated on this position in his Felicidad de México ("Mexico's Happiness") of 1675, claiming that Laso de la Vega's text must have been based on documents created through collaborations between the Franciscan faculty of the College of Santa Cruz Tlatelolco and their indigenous pupils shortly after the apparition itself and purported to have been in the custody of Fernando de Alva Cortés Ixtlilxochitl. He even claimed to have seen among these papers "a manuscript book written in the letters of our alphabet in an Indian's hand in which were described the four apparitions of the Most Holy Virgin to the Indian Juan Diego and his uncle Juan Bernardino."

Other scholars who have disputed Laso de la Vega's authorship include Francisco de Florencia, a Jesuit chronicler, who assumed that the "Indian manuscript" mentioned by Becerra Tanco was written by Jerónimo de Mendieta (d. 1605), a Franciscan missionary and historian in early New Spain, and Carlos de Sigüenza y Góngora, Florencia's censor, who, by way of correction of his charge, swore that he "found this account among the papers of Fernando de Alva. [...] The original in Mexican [Nahuatl] is of the letter of don Antonio Valeriano, an Indian, who is its true author". According to the sworn testimony of D. Carlos de Sigüenza y Góngora, the original preprint was in the calligraphy of Antonio Valeriano, its author. A very old and battered partial manuscript copy of the Nican Mopohua comprising 16 pages and dated to c. 1556 can be found at the Public Library of New York; it has been there since 1880, together with two later copies, one of which is complete. The older copy appears in the Tonanzin Guadalupe with full historical details.

Some contemporary scholars hold the notion that Becerra Tanco, Florencia, and Sigüenza y Góngora endeavored to authenticate the events of the narrative by placing its original authorship in hands that were both native to Mexico and of greater antiquity than the mid-17th century. Since Mexican petitioners to the Vatican for official recognition of the miracle relied on Sigüenza y Góngora's testimony that the story predated the publication of both the Nican Mopohua and Image of the Virgin Mary, ecclesiastical writers have continued to cite Valeriano as its author.
