= Ángel Sánchez =

Ángel Sánchez may refer to:

== People in association football ==
- Ángel Sánchez (footballer, born 1982), Spanish manager and former player
- Ángel Sánchez (footballer, born 1997), Spanish player for Salamanca CF
- Ángel Sánchez (referee) (born 1957), Argentinian, former referee

== Other people ==
- Ángel Sánchez (fashion designer) (born 1960), Venezuelan fashion designer
- Ángel Sánchez (infielder) (born 1983), Puerto Rican baseball coach and former shortstop
- Ángel Sánchez (judoka) (born 1974), Cuban former judoka
- Ángel Sánchez Mendoza (1963–2020), Ecuadorian journalist
- Ángel Sánchez (pitcher) (born 1989), Dominican baseball pitcher

== See also ==
- Miguel Angel Sanchez (disambiguation)
