= Stafford Poole =

American historian (1930–2020)

The Reverend Stafford Poole CM
- Born: March 6, 1930; Oxnard, California, U.S.
- Died: November 1, 2020 (aged 90)
- Education: St. Louis University
- Occupations: Catholic priest and research historian
- Known for: President of the former St. John's Seminary College
- Notable work: writings about the history of the Catholic Church in Mexico
- Parents: Joseph Outhwaite Poole, Sr. (father); Beatrice Hessie Smith (mother)

Stafford Poole, C.M (March 6, 1930 – November 1, 2020) was a Vincentian Catholic priest and a research historian. He was a former professor of history at St. John's Seminary College in Camarillo, California, and later served as president. He is also known for his extensive writings about the history of the Catholic Church in Mexico and the devotion to the Virgin of Guadalupe.

== Early life ==
Poole was born in Oxnard, California, the son of Beatrice Hessie Smith and Joseph Outhwaite Poole Sr. He was raised in North Hollywood. While in grammar schools there, his classmates included both the sons of the singer, Bing Crosby, as well as the future Cardinal Roger Mahony. He attended Los Angeles College during high school. It was a minor seminary run by the Archdiocese of Los Angeles for high-school boys who were considering the priesthood.

== Studies ==
Upon his graduation in 1947 he joined the Congregation of the Mission of Saint Vincent de Paul, taking his vows in 1949. He did his seminary studies at the Vincentian seminary in Perryville, Missouri, earning a bachelor's degree in 1952. He completed his theological studies and was ordained in 1956. After he was ordained he taught in seminaries in the Midwestern United States. He received a Master's degree in Spanish literature in 1958 and then in 1961 his doctorate in history, both from St. Louis University.

Although his focus was American and European history, Poole's dissertation was titled "The Indian Problem in the Third Mexican Provincial Council, 1585" in which he analyzed recently found documents from the first Provincial Councils of the Catholic Church in Mexico.

== Authorship ==
Poole wrote an article in 1964 for the Jesuit magazine America entitled Tomorrow's Seminaries. In the article he reflected on his experiences from teaching seminarians. The article was a sensation in Church circles, and he was soon approached to write a book on the topic. He contracted with the American branch of the German publishing house Herder & Herder which specialized in works on Catholic topics. They published his book, Seminary in Crisis, in 1965. He was involved as an expert consultant on seminary formation for the United States Conference of Bishops and other authorities for the next twenty years.

He continued to take an interest in the council which he had studied for his dissertation and wrote several articles on it for scholarly journals with Hispanic focus. As a result, he was led to translate the Apologia of the Spanish Dominican friar and bishop, Bartolomé de las Casas, who was a major defender of Native American rights in the new colonies of the Spanish Empire. This was a Latin work of the speeches Las Casas delivered at the Valladolid debate of 1550–1551. This was published in 1974 by Northern Illinois University Press. A second edition appeared in 1992 and is still in print.

Poole also researched the life of Pedro Moya de Contreras, the third Archbishop of Mexico, who had convoked and presided at the Third Mexican Council. This biography was published by the University of California Press in 1987. A second, revised edition was published by the University of Oklahoma Press in 2011 and a Spanish translation by the Colegio de Michoacán, Mexico. His research into the archbishop's life caused him to be interested in that of the prelate's mentor, Juan de Ovando. In 2004 the University of Oklahoma Press published the biography, Juan de Ovando: Governing the Spanish Empire in the Reign of Philip II.

In 1971 Poole was assigned to teach Church history at St. John's Seminary College, which at that time was administered by his religious congregation for the Archdiocese of Los Angeles. He was appointed President of the college in 1980, but resigned in 1984 due to a disagreement with the Archdiocese about structural changes in the school.

== Guadalupan studies ==
After his retirement from active teaching in 1990, Poole became the archivist for the Western Province of his Congregation.

In addition to that he was able to work on an interest he had long felt, on the history of the apparitions of Our Lady of Guadalupe. For this he undertook the study of Classical Nahuatl and published several works in that field.

Poole's writings regarding Our Lady of Guadalupe include the books Our Lady of Guadalupe: The Origins and Sources of a Mexican National Symbol, 1531-1797, an English translation of Luis Laso de la Vega's Nahuatl account of the apparition, Huei tlamahuiçoltica and a translation and critical edition of two Nahuatl plays about the Virgin. In 2006 he published The Guadalupan Controversies in Mexico, where, along with other experts in the field, he disputed the historicity of Juan Diego, the Aztec man to whom the Virgin is believed to have appeared. Poole opposed the efforts to have him declared a saint, in which he was ultimately unsuccessful.

== List of works ==
- Poole, Stafford, C.M. (1965). Seminary in Crisis. Herder & Herder.
- De las Casas, Bartolomé (1992). In Defense of the Indians. Northern Illinois University Press. ISBN 978-0-87580-556-6., foreword by Martin Marty, translated by Stafford Poole
- Poole, Stafford (1995). Our Lady of Guadalupe: The Origins and Sources of a Mexican National Symbol, 1531-1797. University of Arizona Press. ISBN 978-0-8165-1623-0.
- The Story of Guadalupe: Luis Laso de la Vega's Huei tlamahuiçoltica of 1649. Stanford University Press. 1998. ISBN 978-0-8047-3483-7. Edited and Translated by Lisa Sousa, Stafford Poole, C.M., and James Lockhart
- Poole, Stafford (2004). Juan de Ovando: Governing the Spanish Empire in the Reign of Philip II. University of Oklahoma Press. ISBN 978-0-8061-3592-2.
- Poole, Stafford (2006). The Guadalupan Controversies in Mexico. Stanford University Press Books. ISBN 978-0-8047-5252-7.
- Nahuatl Theater, Volume 2: Our Lady of Guadalupe. University of Oklahoma Press. 2006. ISBN 978-0-8061-3794-0. Edited by Barry D. Sell, Louise M. Burkhart, Stafford Poole
- Poole, Stafford (2011). Pedro Moya de Contreras: Catholic Reform and Royal Power in New Spain, 1571-1591 (2nd ed.). University of Oklahoma Press. ISBN 978-0-8061-4171-8.
- Burkhart, Louise M. (2011). Aztecs on Stage: Religious Theater in Colonial Mexico. University of Oklahoma Press. ISBN 978-0-8061-4209-8. Translated by: Barry D. Sell & Stafford Poole
- Idea of a New General History of North America: An Account of Colonial Native Mexico by Lorenzo Boturini Benaduci. University of Oklahoma Press, 2015. Stafford Poole (Translator), Susan Schroeder Ph.D. (Foreword)

== External sources ==
- Missouri State University Press "Biography"
