= Michael Sanchez =

Michael Sanchez may refer to:

- Michael S. Sanchez (born 1950), American attorney and politician
- Michael Sánchez (born 1986), Cuban volleyball player
- Michael Sanchez (singer), participant in the 11th season of the American reality show The Voice

== See also ==
- Miguel Sanchez (disambiguation)
- Mike Sanchez (Jesus Miguel "Mike" Sanchez, born 1964), British musician
