= Consuelo Jimenez Underwood =

Mexican-American textile artist

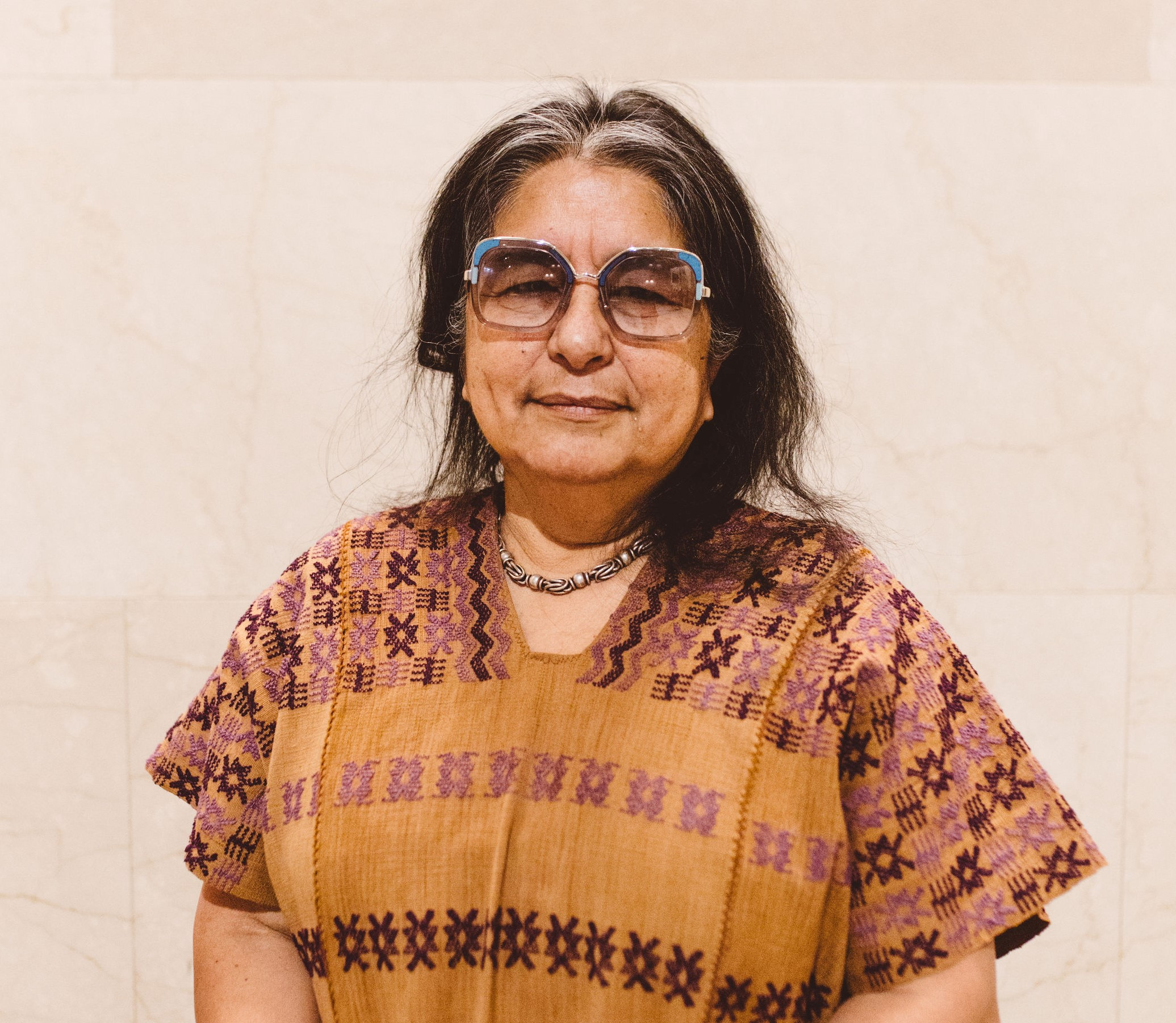
- Born: 1949; Sacramento
- Alma mater: San Diego State University; San Jose State University
- Occupation: Artist, professor
- Employer: San Jose State University
- Style: fiber art
- Awards: Fellow of the American Craft Council (2018)
- Website: www.consuelojunderwood.com

Consuelo Jiménez Underwood (born 1949 in Sacramento, California) is an American fiber artist, known for her pieces that focus on immigration issues. She is an indigenous Chicana currently based in Cupertino, California. As an artist she works with textiles in attempt to unify her American roots with her Mexican Indigenous ones, along with trying to convey the same for other multicultural people.

== Biography ==
Consuelo Jimenez Underwood was born in Sacramento, California, the eleventh child born to a Chicana (Mexican-American) mother and father of Huichol Indian descent. Her family, herself included, were all migrant field workers in California, and due to her father's legal status, when said fields were raided by what was then known as the Immigration and Naturalization Service (INS), he would get deported. The family had homes in both Calexico, California and Mexicali, Mexico, and they would cross the border between the two multiple times per day. Jiménez Underwood initially studied painting in college but felt connected to fiber work through her Huichol Indian heritage and switched concentrations. Before solely pursuing art, she was an adjunct professor at the California College of the Arts in Berkeley (2007), Assistant Professor (1989-1996), Associate Professor (1996-2001), and Professor of Art at San Jose State University (2001-2009).

Jimenez Underwood was introduced to the uses of textile at a young age, she would watch her mother crochet and embroider. She has stated that making art through the use of textile allows her to have some recognition of her mother as well as of her culture, her father's indigenous roots. During her college education she decided to learn these traditions using textile to keep them alive and embrace like her indigenous ancestors did.

== Education ==
Jiménez Underwood was the first person in her family to complete high school, before going on to earn a Bachelor's degree (BA) in 1981 in art from San Diego State University, where she also studied for her Master's degree (MA) in 1985. She then went on to obtain a master's degree in fine arts (MFA) at San Jose State University in 1987. She went on to spend twenty years as an educator and Head of Fiber/Textile Area at the School of Art and Design at San Jose State University, first as associate professor and from 1989 to 2001, then as Professor from 2001 to 2009.

== Artwork ==
Caltrans warning sign for immigrants potentially entering and crossing the freeway. Designed by Caltrans graphic artist John Hood in the late 1980s and erected along San Diego freeways starting in September 1990.

Run, Jane, Run! (2004), inspired by the above sign, by Consuelo Jimenez Underwood at the Renwick Gallery in Washington, DC in 2022

Jiménez Underwood's artwork focuses on the Mexican-American border and the political complexities surrounding it. Her pieces are informed by her memories of growing up on the border and having to smuggle her undocumented father back into the United States. Her mixed media pieces combine traditional materials like thread and silk with barbed wire and safety pins. Jiménez Underwood's imagery includes flowers, "Immigrants Crossing" road signs, tortillas, and Our Lady of Guadalupe.

In 1987 Jimenez Underwood was named an Emerging Talent by the American Craft Council.

In a 2004 exhibition review Barbara Morris writes, “Underwood, uses an elegant weaving technique, interspersed with a variety of non-traditional media and techniques, to convey a personal message of human rights issues."

Jimenez Underwood's work is in the collection of the Smithsonian American Art Museum (SAAM). Her work, Run, Jane, Run!, was acquired by SAAM as part of the Renwick Gallery's 50th Anniversary Campaign. In 2018 she became fellow of the American Craft Council.

=== Borderlines ===
A series of multi media art installations from 2010 to 2017, Jimenez Underwood's Borderlines pieces involve paint, yarn, beads, barbed wire and more. Her use of barbed wire being an immediate tie to the border and the suffering it brings to the immigrants that cross it. These pieces are a depiction of the Mexico - U.S. border that she states she created in hopes of bringing awareness to the many dangerous effects that the border has and will continue to have as time goes on. The effects it'll have on the coming generations, the environment, the alienation it instills in humanity.

=== Flags ===
Another series, dated 1993 and 2013, her Flags are made of fiber, fabric, threads, leather, plastic, pins, and beads that create the merging of the Mexico and United States flags. Bright colors from the blue of the American flag to the green of the Mexican flag, the stars, and the eagle all make the use of both flags stand out and contrast one another. Combining the flags, through pieces or what appears to be a silhouette of both in "One Nation Underground" is with the intent of expressing her multiculturalism and that of others, embracing both cultures and inevitably combining them and all that comes with each individual country.

=== Virgen de los Caminos ===
Made in 1994 of cotton, silk, and metallic thread, Virgen De los Caminos (Virgin of the Roads) is now hung at the Smithsonian American Art Museum. This piece is a children's quilt with embroidered flowers, barbed wire, la Virgen De Guadalupe (a religious Mexican symbol), and almost invisible appearances of the word "Caution" accompanied by the silhouettes by John Hood that are also seen in C. Jane Run. Authors Jonathan Yorba and Cristina Serna suggest that the Virgin of Guadalupe is a guardian saint for the immigrants crossing into the United States from Mexico, with the images from Hood's road signs being embroidered in white onto the light colored fabric to express that immigrant families are ghosts, nearly invisible and somehow unnoticed by others.

== Bibliography ==
1. Bluestone, Rebecca, Laura M. Bryant, Lia Cook, Emily DuBois, Carolyn P. Dyer, Ann B. Keister, Ramona Sakiestewa, Linda Feliz, Susie Taylor, and Consuelo Jimenez-Underwood. Timeless Tradition, Present Meanings: Contemporary Art by Women Weavers. Fullerton, Calif.: Art Gallery, California State University, Fullerton, 1996. Print.
2. Cortez, Constance. "History/whose-story? Postcoloniality and Contemporary Chicana Art." Chicana/latina Studies. 6.2 (2007): 22–54. Print.
3. E., Laura. “Rethinking Immigration with Art.” Tikkun, Duke University Press, 1 Aug. 2013, read.dukeupress.edu/tikkun/article/28/3/38-41/91570.
4. Consuelo Jimenez Underwood. San Francisco, Calif.: KQED, Inc, 2003.
5. Rindfleisch, Jan, with articles by Maribel Alvarez and Raj Jayadev, edited by Nancy Hom and Ann Sherman. Roots and Offshoots: Silicon Valley’s Arts Community. Santa Clara, CA: Ginger Press., 2017. ISBN 978-0-9983084-0-1
6. Román-Odio C. (2011) Transnational Feminism, Globalization, and the Politics of Representation in Chicana Visual Art. In: Román-Odio C., Sierra M. (eds) Transnational Borderlands in Women's Global Networks. Comparative Feminist Studies Series. Palgrave Macmillan, New York
7. Román-Odio C. (2013) Globalization and Chicana Politics of Representation. In: Sacred Iconographies in Chicana Cultural Productions. Comparative Feminist Studies Series. Palgrave Macmillan, New York
8. Romo, T. "Weaving Politics: Consuelo Jimenez Underwood." Surface Design Journal. 29.1 (2004): 24–29. Print.
9. Sauvion, Carol, Patricia Bischetti, Rosey Guthrie, Faith Ringgold, Randall Darwall, Consuelo J. Underwood, Terese Agnew, and Laura Karpman. Craft in America. Arlington, Va.: PBS, 2012.
10. Sauvion, Carol, Emily Zaiden, and Underwood C. Jimenez. Mano-made: New Expression in Craft by Latino Artists : Consuelo Jimenez Underwood, 2017. Print.
11. Sierra, Marta, and Clara Roman-Odio, eds. Transnational Borderlands in Women’s Global Networks: The Making of Cultural Resistance. Springer, 2011.
12. Theung, Linda. The U.s.-Mexico Border: Place, Imagination, and Possibility, 2017. Print.
13. Underwood, Consuelo J, and Mija Riedel. Oral History Interview with Consuelo Jimenez Underwood, 2011. Print.
14. Von Roni Jo Draper. “Arts Education and Literacies.” ISBN 978-1-138-80697-9
