= Image of the Virgin Mary Mother of God of Guadalupe =

Written account of Marian apparition

Image of the Virgin Mary Mother of God of Guadalupe (Spanish: Imagen de la Virgen María, madre de Dios de Guadalupe) published in 1648, was the first written account of the story of Our Lady of Guadalupe. It retells the events of the 1531 apparitions that led to the Marian veneration in Mexico City, New Spain. It was drafted by the secular priest Miguel Sánchez and dedicated to Bishop Pedro de Barrientos Lomelin, based on the prophecy of the Woman of the Apocalypse in Revelation 12.

== Importance ==
The text is a foundation of the devotion to the Virgin of Guadalupe in Mexico. It was the first written account of events that had until then had only spread and become known by word of mouth. The text stated for the first time that the image venerated by Mexicans was of miraculous origin and recorded that the dates of Guadalupana appearances were comprised between 9 and 13 December 1531. In this way, the image of the Virgin of Guadalupe was established as true symbol of Mexican-ness.

Because of this work, Francisco de la Maza called Miguel Sánchez one of the "four guadalupan evangelists".

=== Sections (as written in the book) ===
- Aprobación del Dr. D. Iván de poblete.
- Al señor doctor.
- Fvndamento de la historia.
- Original prophetico de la santa imagen.
- Misterioso dibujo de la santa imagen en la valerosa conquista de sv ciudad de México.
- Historia de nuestra señora (in Latin).
  - Mvlier Amicta sole.
  - Luna svb pedibvs eivs.
  - Et in capite eivs corona.
  - Ciamabat partvriens, et crv.
  - Factvm est pralivm magnvm.
  - Mvlier fvgit in solitvdinem.
  - Dat æ svnt mvlieri al ædv æ.
  - Et misit serpens ex ore svo.
- Milagroso "Descvbrimiento de la santa imagen con los prodigios de sv aparición.
- Segunda aparición.
- Tercera aparición.
- Quarta aparición.
- Vltima aparición.
- Pincel "Cvidadoso de la santa imagen, que son amorosos elogios retoca sv pintvra.
  - Apparvit in coelo.
  - Mvlier.
  - Amicta sole.
  - Lvna svb pedievs eivs.
  - Et in capite eivs corona.
  - Mvlier gvgit in solitvdinem.
  - Michael, et Angeli eivs proe.
  - Datæ svnt mvlieri al æ dv æ.
- Solumne colocación de la santa imagen en sv hermita de gvadalvpe.
- Descripción del santvario de gvadalvpe.
- Milagros de la santa imagen de Gvadalvpe.
- Licencia.
