= Miguel Angel Sanchez =

Miguel Angel Sanchez may refer to:

- Miguel Ángel Sánchez (Argentine footballer) (1936–2008)
- Míchel (footballer, born 1975) (Miguel Ángel Sánchez Muñoz, born 1975), Spanish footballer
- Miguel Ángel Sánchez (Nicaraguan footballer) (born 1980), Nicaraguan footballer
- Miguel Ángel Sánchez (cyclist) (born 1943), Costa Rican Olympic cyclist

== See also ==
- Ángel Sánchez (disambiguation)
