= Our Lady of Guadalupe =

Marian apparitions in December 1531

Coordinates: 19°29′04″N 99°07′02″W

Our Lady of Guadalupe: Empress of the Americas; Patroness of Latin America; Queen of Mexico
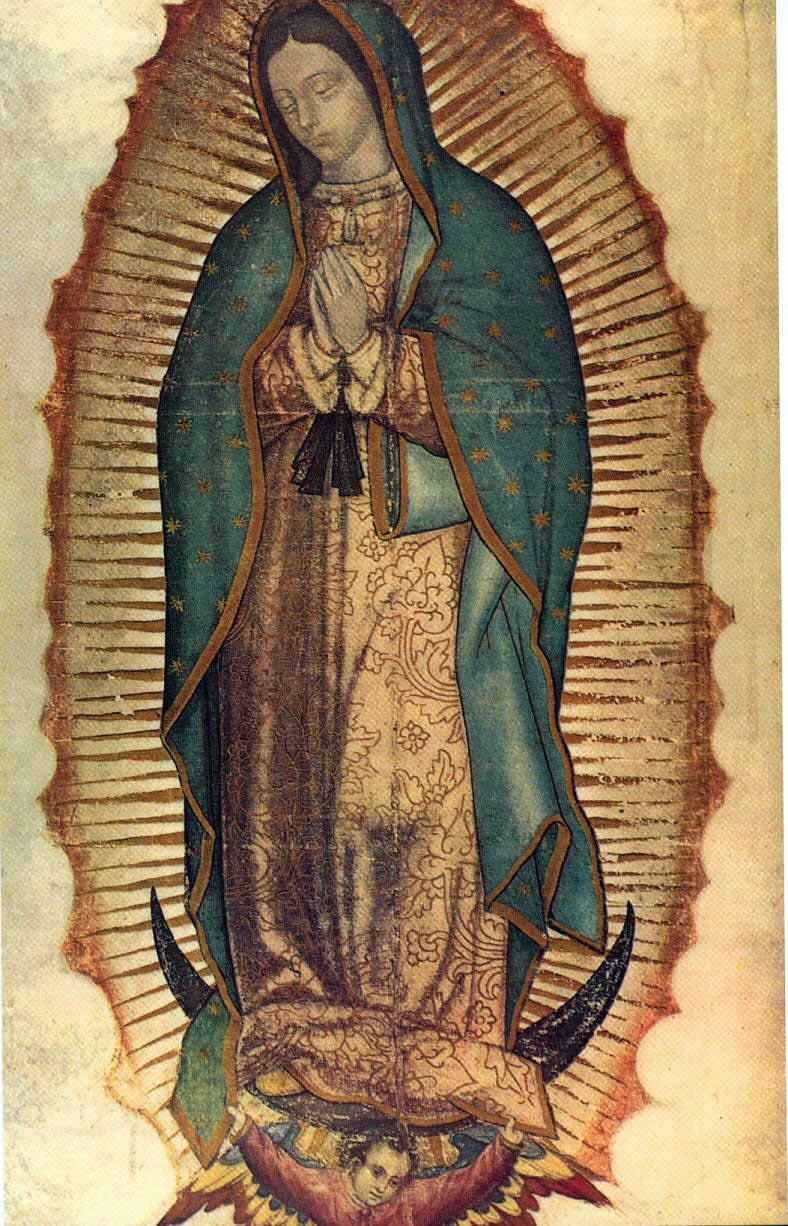
- Location: Tepeyac Hill, Mexico City
- Date: December 9–12, 1531 O.S. (December 19–22, 1531 N.S.)
- Witness: Juan Diego; Juan Bernardino
- Type: Marian apparition
- Approval: October 12, 1895 (canonical coronation granted by Pope Leo XIII)
- Venerated in: Catholic Church; Evangelical Catholic Lutherans; Anglo-Catholics
- Shrine: Basilica of Our Lady of Guadalupe, Tepeyac Hill, Mexico City, Mexico
- Patronage: Mexico City (1737); New Spain (1754 by Pope Benedict XIV); Ponce, Puerto Rico (1757); Philippines (July 16, 1935); Latin America (October 12, 1945); Mexico and the Americas (2000 by Pope John Paul II); Cebu (2002 by Cardinal Ricardo Vidal)
- Attributes: A pregnant woman, eyes downcast, hands clasped in prayer, clothed in a pink tunic robe covered by a cerulean mantle with a black sash, emblazoned with eight-point stars; eclipsing a blazing sun while standing atop a darkened crescent moon, a cherubic angel carrying her train
- Feast day: December 12

Our Lady of Guadalupe (Spanish: Nuestra Señora de Guadalupe), also known as the Virgin of Guadalupe (Spanish: Virgen de Guadalupe) and as La Virgen Morena, is a Catholic title of the Blessed Virgin Mary associated with four Marian apparitions to Juan Diego and one to his uncle Juan Bernardino reported in December 1531, when the Mexican territories were part of the Spanish Empire.

A venerated image on a cloak (tilmahtli) associated with the apparition is enshrined in the Basilica of Our Lady of Guadalupe in Mexico City.

Pope Leo XIII granted a decree of canonical coronation for the image on 8 February 1887. The rite of coronation was executed by the former Archbishop of Mexico, Próspero Alarcón y Sánchez de la Barquera on 12 October 1895. Pope Paul VI raised the shrine to the status of Minor Basilica via his Pontifical decree titled Sacra illa Ædes on 6 October 1976. It is the most-visited Catholic shrine in the world, and the world's third most-visited sacred site.

== Description of Marian apparitions ==
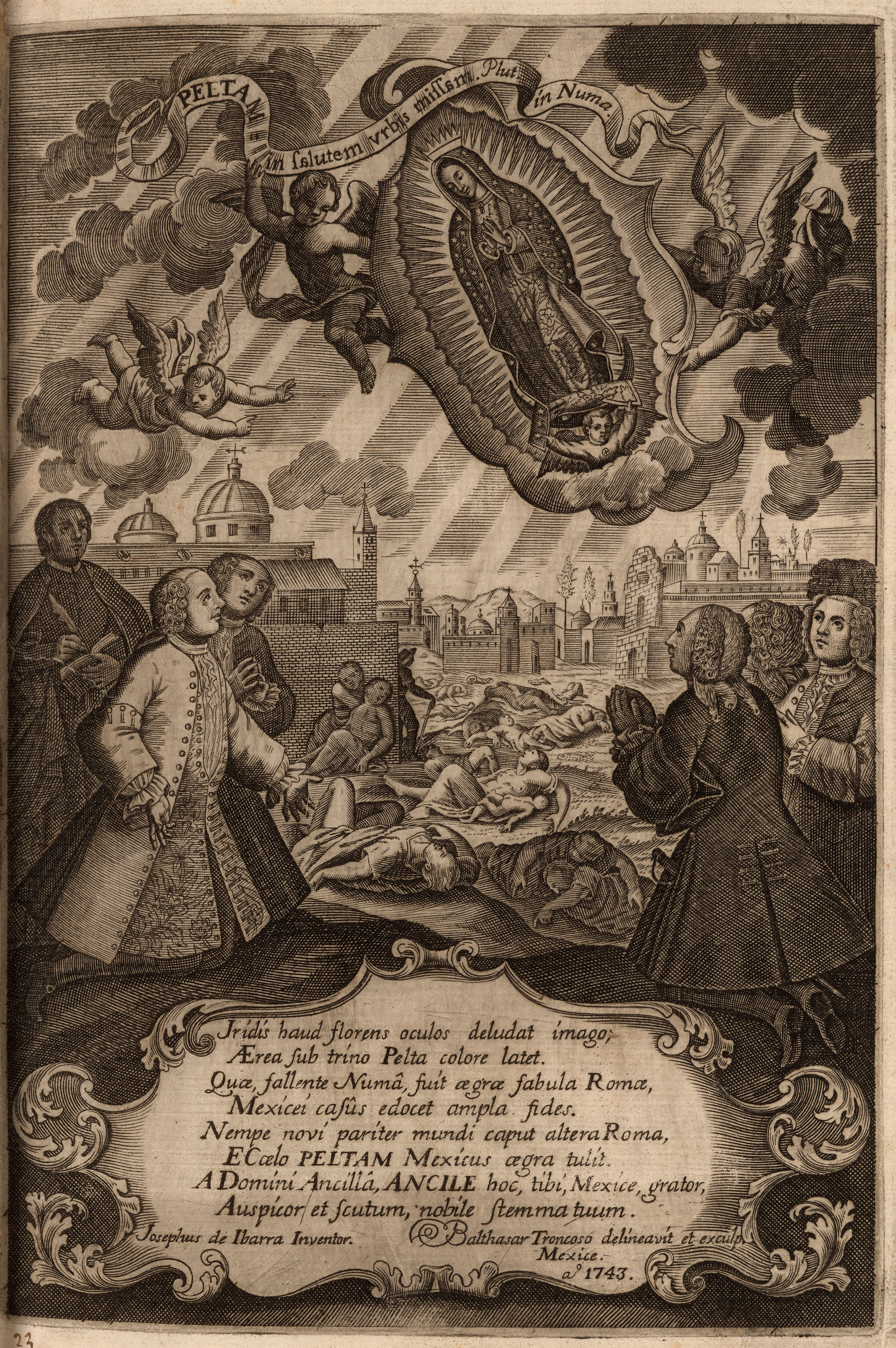
Preliminary drawing of the Mexican Coat of arms, c. 1743.

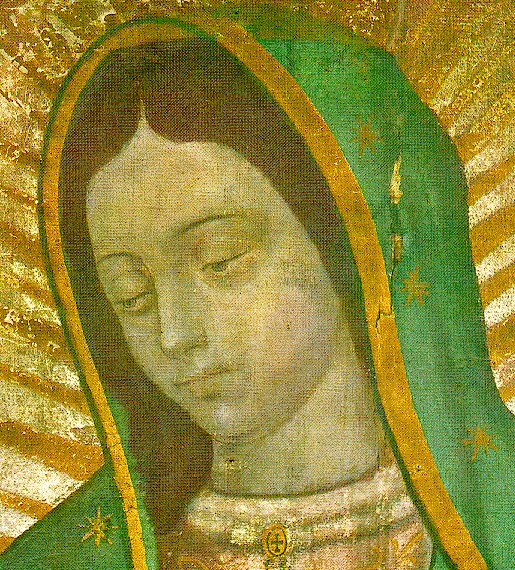
Detail of the face, showing the discoloration on the top part of the head, where a crown was present at some point, now obscured by an enlarged frame for unknown reasons.

According to the Nican Mopohua, included in the 17th-century Huei tlamahuiçoltica, written in Nahuatl, the Virgin Mary appeared four times to Juan Diego, a Chichimec peasant, and once to his uncle, Juan Bernardino. The first apparition occurred on the morning of Saturday, December 9, 1531 (Julian calendar, which is December 19 on the (proleptic) Gregorian calendar in present use). Juan Diego experienced a vision of a young woman at a place called the Hill of Tepeyac, which later became part of Villa de Guadalupe, in a suburb of Mexico City.

According to the accounts, the woman, speaking to Juan Diego in Nahuatl, his first language and the language of the former Aztec Empire, identified herself as the Mary, "mother of the very true deity". She was said to have asked for a church to be erected at that site in her honor.

Based on her words, Juan Diego then sought the Archbishop of Mexico City, Juan de Zumárraga, to tell him what had happened. Not unexpectedly, the Archbishop did not believe Juan Diego. Later the same day, Juan Diego saw the young woman again (the second apparition), and she asked him to continue insisting.

The next day, Sunday, December 10, 1531, in the Julian calendar, Juan Diego spoke to the Archbishop a second time. The latter instructed him to return to Tepeyac and to ask the woman for a truly acceptable, miraculous sign to prove her identity. Later that day, the third apparition appeared when Juan Diego returned to Tepeyac; encountering the same woman, he reported to her the Archbishop's request for a sign, which she consented to provide on the next day (December 11).

On Monday, December 11, however, Juan Diego's uncle fell ill and he was obliged to attend to him. In the early hours of Tuesday, December 12, as Juan Bernardino's condition deteriorated, Juan Diego journeyed to Tlatelolco in search of a Catholic priest to hear Juan Bernardino's confession and help minister to him on his deathbed.

To avoid being delayed by the Virgin and ashamed at having failed to meet her on Monday as agreed, Juan Diego chose another route around Tepeyac Hill, yet the Virgin intercepted him and asked where he was going (fourth apparition); Juan Diego explained what had happened and the Virgin gently chided him for not having made recourse to her. In the words which have become the most famous phrase of the Guadalupe apparitions and are inscribed above the main entrance to the Basilica of Guadalupe, she asked "¿No estoy yo aquí que soy tu madre?" ("Am I not here, I who am your mother?"). She assured him that Juan Bernardino had now recovered and told him to gather flowers from the summit of Tepeyac Hill, which was normally barren, especially in the cold of December. Juan Diego obeyed her instruction and he found Castile roses, not native to Mexico, blooming there.

According to the story, the Virgin arranged the flowers in Juan Diego's tilmàtli or cloak, and when Juan Diego opened his cloak later that day before Archbishop Zumárraga, the flowers fell to the floor, revealing on the fabric the image of the Virgin.

The next day, December 13, Juan Diego found his uncle fully recovered as the Virgin had assured him, and Juan Bernardino recounted that he also had seen her after praying at his bedside (fifth apparition); that she had instructed him to inform the Archbishop of this apparition and of his miraculous cure; and that she had told him she desired to be known under the title of "Guadalupe".

The Archbishop kept Juan Diego's mantle, first in his private chapel and then in the church on public display, where it attracted great attention. On December 26, 1531, a procession formed to transfer the miraculous image back to Tepeyac Hill where it was installed in a small, hastily erected chapel. During this procession, the first miracle was allegedly performed when a native was mortally wounded in the neck by an arrow shot by accident during a stylized martial display performed in honor of the Virgin. In great distress, the natives carried him before the Virgin's image and pleaded for his life. Upon the arrow being withdrawn, the victim fully and immediately recovered.

== History ==
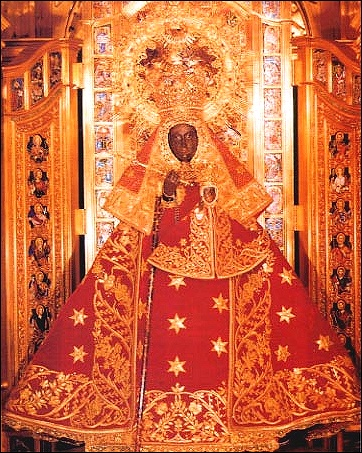
Virgin of Guadalupe in Monastery of Guadalupe, in Cáceres, Extremadura, Spain, illustrating the example of a black Madonna.

=== Origin in Guadalupe, Spain ===
The shrine to Our Lady of Guadalupe in Guadalupe, Cáceres, in Extremadura, Spain, was the most important of the shrines to the Virgin Mary in the medieval Kingdom of Castile. It is one of the many Black Madonnas in Spain and is revered in the Monastery of Santa María de Guadalupe, in the town of Guadalupe, from which numerous Spanish conquistadors stem.

The most popular etymology of the name "Guadalupe" is from the Arabic "Wadi" (river) and the Latin word "lupus" (wolf). Some find it unlikely that Arabic and Latin would be combined in this way, and suggest as an alternative the Arabic "Wadi-al-lub", signifying a river with black stones in its bed.

The shrine houses a statue reputed to have been carved by Luke the Evangelist and given to Archbishop Leander of Seville by Pope Gregory I. According to local legend, when Seville was taken by the Moors in 712, a group of priests fled northward and buried the statue in the hills near the Guadalupe River.

At the beginning of the 14th century, the Virgin appeared one day to a humble cowboy named Gil Cordero who was searching for a missing animal in the mountains. Cordero claimed that Mary had appeared to him and ordered him to ask priests to dig at the site of the apparition. Excavating priests rediscovered the hidden statue and built a small shrine around it which became the great Guadalupe monastery.

=== Origin in Mexico ===
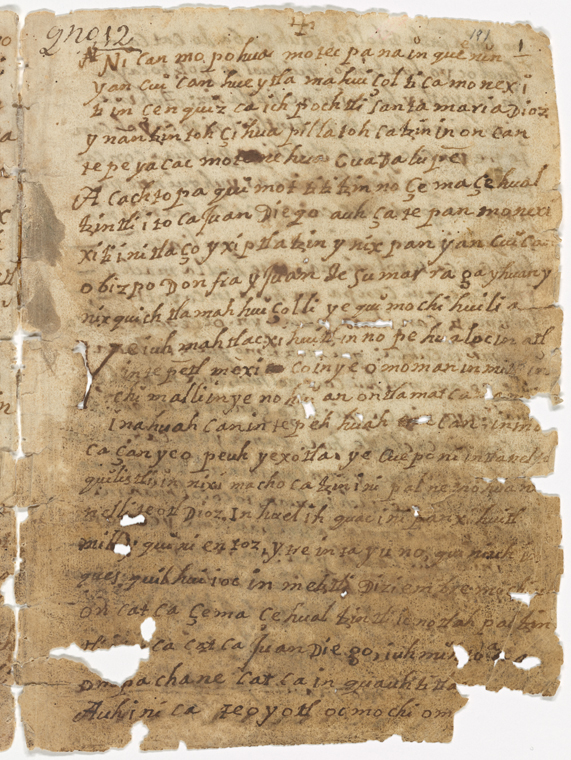
Nican mopohua

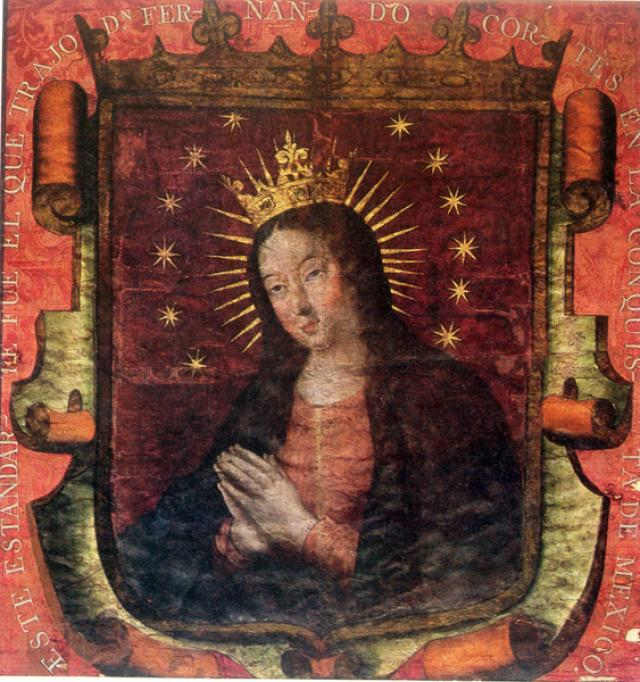
The banner of the Mexican conquistador Hernán Cortés from the year 1521, which was kept within the Archbishop's villa during the time of the Guadalupe apparitions

Following the Conquest in 1519–1521, the Marian cult was brought to the Americas and Franciscan friars often leveraged syncretism with existing religious beliefs as an instrument for evangelization. What is purported by some to be the earliest mention of the miraculous apparition of the Virgin is a page of parchment, the Codex Escalada from 1548, which was discovered in 1995 and, according to investigative analysis, dates from the sixteenth century. This document bears two pictorial representations of Juan Diego and the apparition, several inscriptions in Nahuatl referring to Juan Diego by his Aztec name, and the date of his death: 1548, as well as the year that the then named Virgin Mary appeared: 1531. It also contains the glyph of Antonio Valeriano; and finally, the signature of Fray Bernardino de Sahagun which was authenticated by experts from the Banco de Mexico and Charles E. Dibble. Historians Alberto Peralta and Stafford Poole questioned the authenticity of the document.

A more complete early description of the apparition occurs in a 16-page manuscript called the Nican mopohua, which has been reliably dated in 1556 and was acquired by the New York Public Library in 1883. This document, written in Nahuatl, tells the story of the apparitions and the supernatural origin of the image. It was probably composed by a native Aztec man, Antonio Valeriano, who had been educated by Franciscans. The text of this document was later incorporated into a printed pamphlet which was widely circulated in 1649.

In spite of these documents, there are no known 16th century written accounts of the Guadalupe vision by the archbishop Juan de Zumárraga. In particular, the canonical account of the vision features archbishop Juan de Zumárraga as a major player in the story, but, although Zumárraga was a prolific writer, there is nothing in his extant writings that can confirm the indigenous story.

The written record suggests the Catholic clergy in 16th century Mexico were deeply divided as to the orthodoxy of the native beliefs springing up around the image of Our Lady of Guadalupe, with the Franciscan order (who then had custody of the chapel at Tepeyac) being strongly opposed to the outside groups, while the Dominicans supported it.

The main promoter of the story was the Dominican Alonso de Montúfar, who succeeded the Franciscan Juan de Zumárraga as archbishop of Mexico. In a 1556 sermon Montúfar commended popular devotion to "Our Lady of Guadalupe", referring to a painting on cloth (the tilma) in the chapel of the Virgin Mary at Tepeyac, where certain miracles had also occurred. Days later, Fray Francisco de Bustamante, local head of the Franciscan order, delivered a sermon denouncing the native belief and believers. He expressed concern that the Catholic Archbishop was promoting a superstitious regard for an indigenous image:

The devotion at the chapel ... to which they have given the name Guadalupe was prejudicial to the Indians because they believed that the image itself worked miracles, contrary to what the missionary friars had been teaching them, and because many were disappointed when it did not.

Archbishop Montúfar opened an inquiry into the matter at which the Franciscans repeated their position that the image encouraged idolatry and superstition, and four witnesses testified to Bustamante's statement that the image was painted by an Indian, with one witness naming him "the Indian painter Marcos". This could refer to the Aztec painter Marcos Cipac de Aquino, who was active at that time. A document called "Informaciones 1556" and published in 1888 states that on September 8, 1556, the feast of the Nativity of Mary, at the end of the sermon that Bustamante gave in the chapel of San José in the convent of San Francisco in Mexico, Bustamante attacked Archbishop Montúfar for having, according to the former, encouraged a devotion that had arisen around an image "painted yesterday by the Indian Marcos".

Prof. Jody Brant Smith, referring to Philip Serna Callahan's examination of the tilma using infrared photography in 1979, wrote: "if Marcos did, he apparently did so without making a preliminary sketches – in itself then seen as a near-miraculous procedure ... Cipac may well have had a hand in painting the Image, but only in painting the additions, such as the angel and moon at the Virgin's feet."

Ultimately Archbishop Montúfar, himself a Dominican, decided to end Franciscan custody of the shrine. From then on the shrine was kept and served by diocesan priests under the authority of the archbishop. Moreover, Archbishop Montúfar authorized the construction of a much larger church at Tepeyac, in which the tilma was later mounted and displayed.

In the late 1570s, the Franciscan historian Bernardino de Sahagún denounced the cult at Tepeyac and the use of the name "Tonantzin" or to call her Our Lady in a personal digression in his General History of the Things of New Spain, also known as the "Florentine Codex":

At this place [Tepeyac], [the Indians] had a temple dedicated to the mother of the gods, whom they called Tonantzin, which means Our Mother. There they performed many sacrifices in honor of this goddess ... And now that a church of Our Lady of Guadalupe is built there, they also called her Tonantzin, being motivated by those preachers who called Our Lady, the Mother of God, Tonantzin. While it is not known for certain where the beginning of Tonantzin may have originated, but this we know for certain, that, from its first usage, the word refers to the ancient Tonantzin. And it was viewed as something that should be remedied, for their having [native] name of the Mother of God, Holy Mary, instead of Tonantzin, but Dios inantzin. It appears to be a Satanic invention to cloak idolatry under the confusion of this name, Tonantzin. And they now come to visit from very far away, as far away as before, which is also suspicious, because everywhere there are many churches of Our Lady and they do not go to them. They come from distant lands to this Tonantzin as in olden times.

Sahagún's criticism of the indigenous group seems to have stemmed primarily from his concern about a syncretistic application of the native name Tonantzin to the Catholic Virgin Mary. However, Sahagún often used the same name in his sermons as late as the 1560s.

=== First printed accounts in Mexico ===
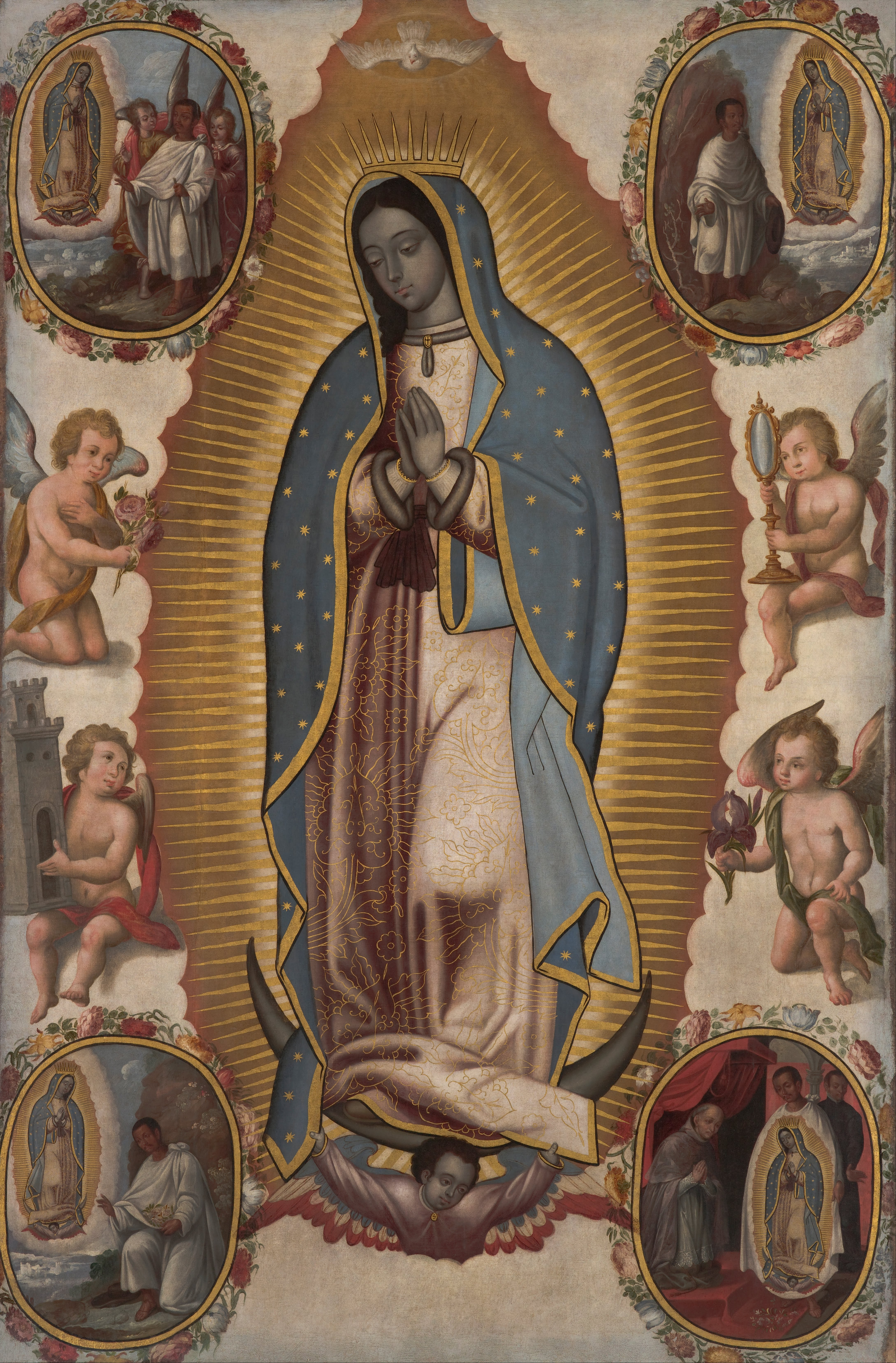
Painting Virgin of Guadalupe, c. 1700, at the Indianapolis Museum of Art, featuring a crown on the Virgin's head, later removed.

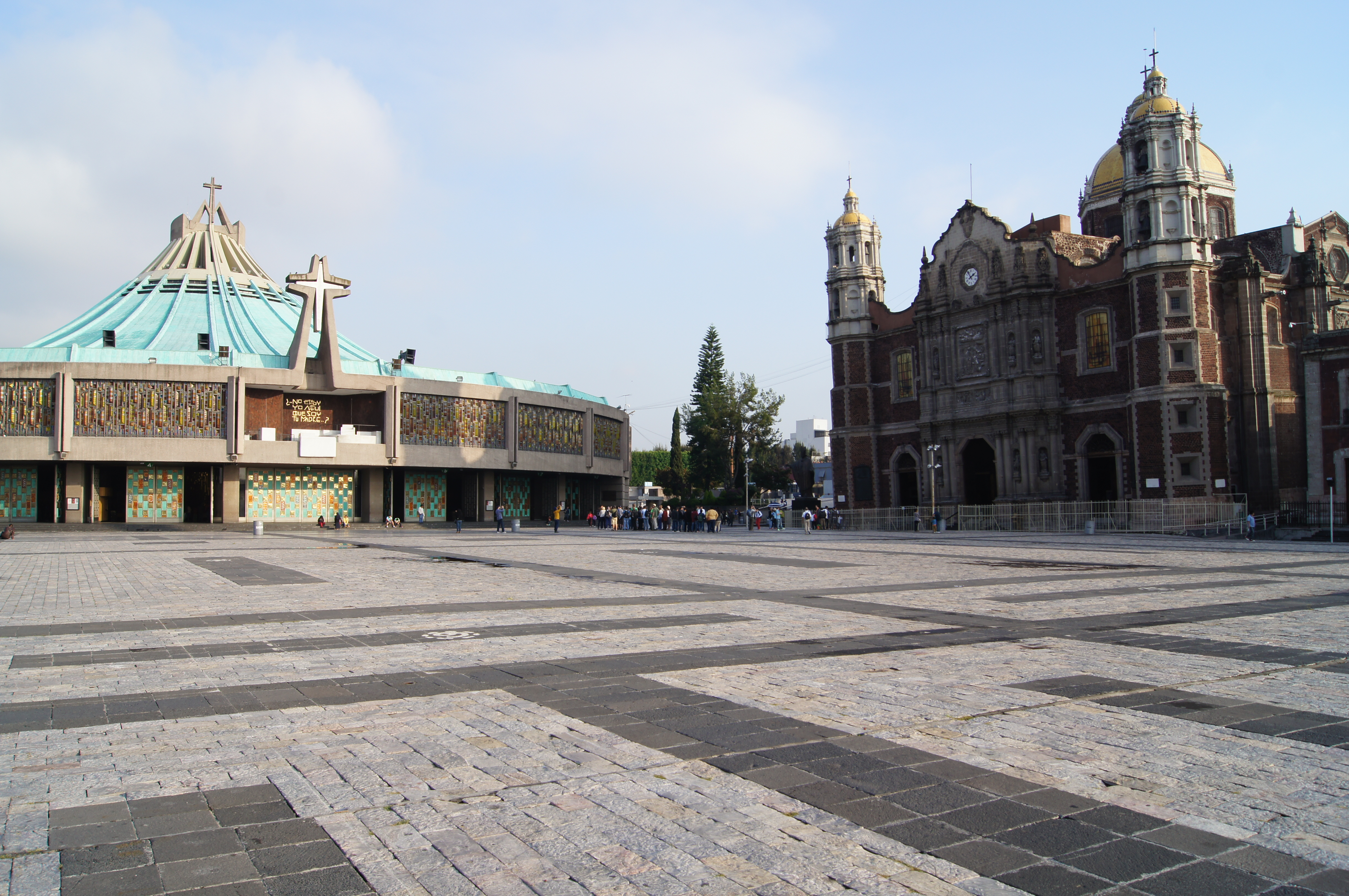
The new (left) and old basilica church.

One of the first printed accounts of the history of the apparitions and image occurs in Imagen de la Virgen Maria, Madre de Dios de Guadalupe, published in 1648 by Miguel Sánchez, a diocesan priest of Mexico City.

Another account is the Codex Escalada, dating from the sixteenth century, a sheet of parchment recording apparitions of the Virgin Mary and the figure of Juan Diego, which reproduces the glyph of Antonio Valeriano alongside the signature of Fray Bernardino de Sahagún. It contains the following glosses: "1548 Also in that year of 1531 appeared to Cuahtlatoatzin our beloved mother the Lady of Guadalupe in Mexico. Cuahtlatoatzin died worthily"

The next printed account was a 36-page tract in the Nahuatl language, Huei tlamahuiçoltica ("The Great Event"), which was published in 1649. This tract contains a section called the Nican mopohua ("Here it is recounted"), which has been already touched on above. The composition and authorship of the Huei tlamahuiçoltica is assigned by a majority of those scholars to Luis Laso de la Vega, vicar of the sanctuary of Tepeyac from 1647 to 1657. Nevertheless, the most important section of the tract, the Nican Mopohua, appears to be much older. It has been attributed since the late 1600s to Antonio Valeriano (c. 1531–1605), a native Aztec man who had been educated by the Franciscans and who collaborated extensively with Bernardino de Sahagún. A manuscript version of the Nican Mopohua, which is now held by the New York Public Library, appears to be dated to c. 1556, and may have been the original work by Valeriano, as that was used by Laso in composing the Huei tlamahuiçoltica. Most authorities agree on the dating and on Valeriano's authorship. According to the skeptic and investigator of the paranormal, Joe Nickell, if the main source, the Huei tlamahuiçoltica, was published in 1649, the legend it narrates date to after that time.

On the other hand, in 1666, the scholar Luis Becerra Tanco published in Mexico a book about the history of the apparitions under the name Origen milagroso del santuario de Nuestra Señora de Guadalupe, which was republished in Spain in 1675 as Felicidad de Mexico. In the same way, in 1688, Jesuit Father Francisco de Florencia published La Estrella del Norte de México, giving the history of the same apparitions.

Two separate accounts, one in Nahuatl from Juan Bautista del Barrio de San Juan from the 16th century, and the other in Spanish by Servando Teresa de Mier date the original apparition and native celebration on September 8 of the Julian calendar, but the latter also says that the Spaniards celebrate it on December 12 instead.

According to the document Informaciones Jurídicas de 1666, a Catholic feast day in name of Our Lady of Guadalupe was requested and approved, as well as the transfer of the date of the feast of the Virgin of Guadalupe from September 8 to December 12, the latest date on which the Virgin supposedly appeared to Juan Diego. The initiative to perform them was made by Francisco de Siles who proposed to ask the Church of Rome, a Mass itself with allusive text to the apparitions and stamping of the image, along with the divine office itself, and the precept of hearing a Catholic Mass on December 12, the last date of the apparitions of the Virgin to Juan Diego as the new date to commemorate the apparitions (which until then was on September 8, the birth of the Virgin).

In 1666, the Church in México began gathering information from people who reported having known Juan Diego, and in 1723 a formal investigation into his life was ordered, where more data was gathered to support his veneration. Because of the Informaciones Jurídicas de 1666 in the year 1754, the Sacred Congregation of Rites confirmed the true and valid value of the apparitions, and granted celebrating Mass and Office for the then Catholic version of the feast of Guadalupe on December 12.

These published accounts of the origin of the image already venerated in Tepeyac, then increased interest in the identity of Juan Diego, who was the original recipient of the prime vision. A new Catholic Basilica church was built to house the image. Completed in 1709, it is now known as the Old Basilica.

In 1785 or 1791 a worker allegedly spilled what might have been nitric acid accidentally on the image. The fact that the image survived is believed to be miraculous by devotees.

=== The crown ornament ===
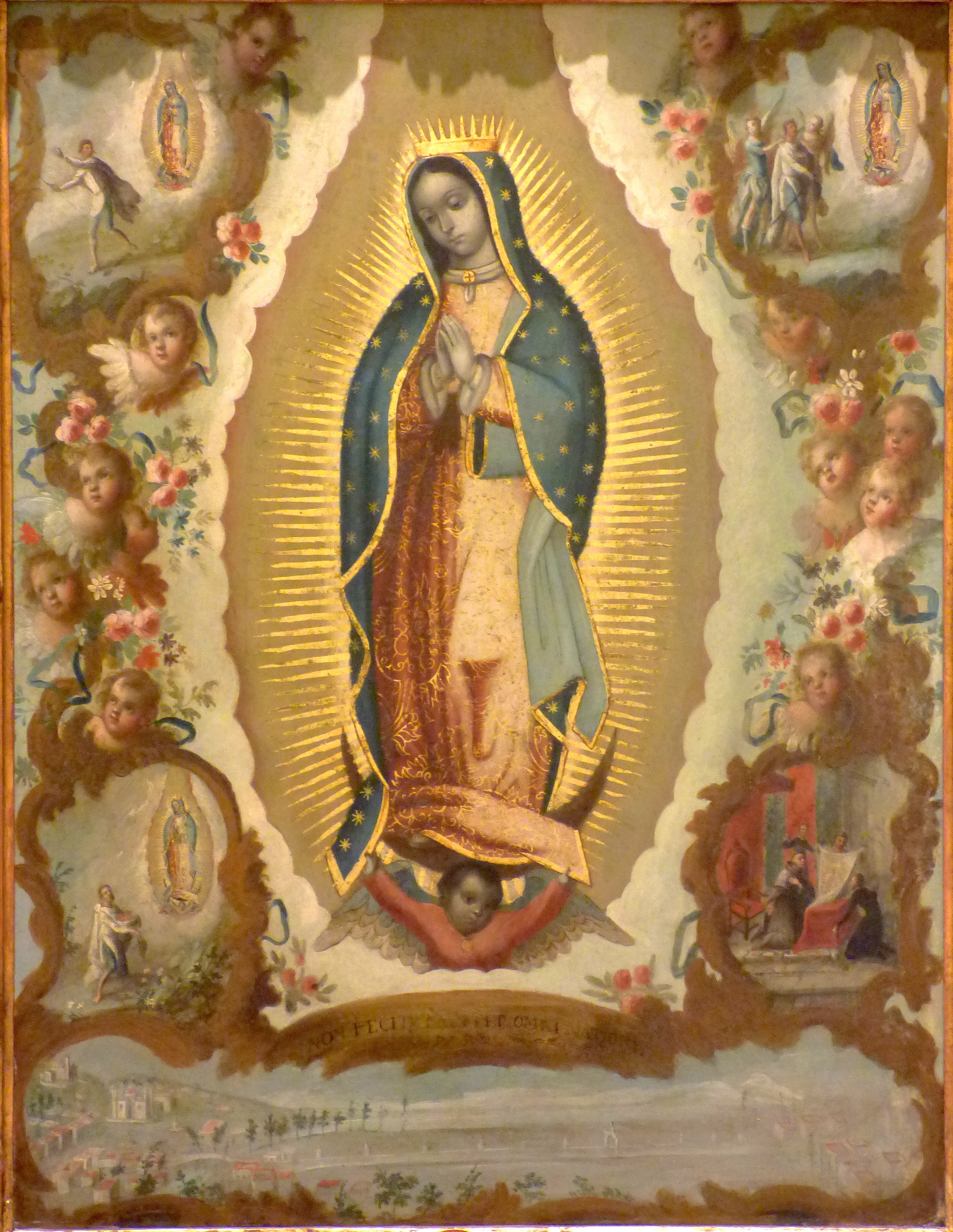
Virgen de Guadalupe con las cuatro apariciones by Juan de Sáenz (Virgin of Guadalupe with the four apparitions by Juan de Sáenz), c. 1777, at the Museo Soumaya.

The image had originally featured a 10-point crown on the Virgin's head, but this disappeared in 1887–88. The change was first noticed on February 23, 1888, when the image was removed to a nearby church. Eventually a painter confessed on his deathbed that he had been instructed by a clergyman to remove the crown. This may have been motivated by the fact that the gold paint was flaking off of the crown, leaving it looking dilapidated. But according to the historian David Brading, "the decision to remove rather than replace the crown was no doubt inspired by a desire to 'modernize' the image and reinforce its similarity to the nineteenth-century images of the Immaculate Conception which were exhibited at Lourdes and elsewhere... What is rarely mentioned is that the frame which surrounded the canvas was adjusted to leave almost no space above the Virgin's head, thereby obscuring the effects of the erasure."

A different crown was installed to the image. On February 8, 1887, a Papal bull from Pope Leo XIII granted permission a Canonical Coronation of the image, which occurred on October 12, 1895.

=== 20th century ===
Since then the Virgin of Guadalupe has been proclaimed "Queen of Mexico", "Patroness of the Americas", "Empress of Latin America", and "Protectress of Unborn Children" (the latter two titles given by Pope John Paul II in 1999).

On November 14, 1921, a bomb hidden within a basket of flowers and left under the tilma by an anti-Catholic secularist exploded and damaged the altar of the Basilica that houses the original image, but the tilma was unharmed, possibly due to the particular placement of the dynamite. A brass standing crucifix, bent by the explosion, is now preserved at the shrine's museum and is believed to be miraculous by devotees.

== The beatification of Juan Diego ==
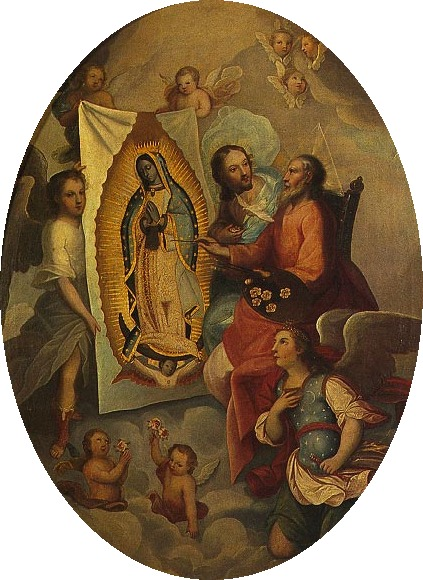
An 18th-century hagiographic painting of God the Father fashioning the image.

Under Pope John Paul II the move to beatify Juan Diego intensified. John Paul II took a special interest in non-European Catholics and saints. During his leadership, the Congregation for the Causes of Saints declared Juan Diego "venerable" (in 1987), and the pope himself announced his beatification on May 6, 1990, during a Mass at the Basilica of Our Lady of Guadalupe in Mexico City, declaring him "protector and advocate of the indigenous peoples", with December 9 established as his feast day.

At that time historians revived doubts as to the quality of the evidence regarding Juan Diego. The writings of bishop Zumárraga, into whose hands Juan purportedly delivered the miraculous image, did not refer to him or the event. The record of the 1556 ecclesiastical inquiry omitted him, and he was not mentioned in documentation before the mid-17th century. In 1996 the 83-year-old abbot of the Basilica of Guadalupe, Guillermo Schulenburg, was forced to resign following an interview published in the Catholic magazine Ixthus, in which he was quoted as saying that Juan Diego was "a symbol, not a reality", and that his canonization would be the "recognition of a cult. It is not recognition of the physical, real existence of a person." In 1883 Joaquín García Icazbalceta, historian and biographer of Zumárraga, in a confidential report on the Lady of Guadalupe for Bishop Labastida, had been hesitant to support the story of the vision. He concluded that Juan Diego had not existed.

In 1995, Father Xavier Escalada, a Jesuit whose four volume Guadalupe encyclopedia had just been published, announced the existence of a sheet of parchment (known as Codex Escalada), which bore an illustrated account of the vision and some notations in Nahuatl concerning the life and death of Juan Diego. Previously unknown, the document was dated 1548. It bore the signatures of Antonio Valeriano and Bernardino de Sahagún, which are considered to verify its contents. The codex was the subject of an appendix to the Guadalupe encyclopedia, published in 1997. Some scholars remained unconvinced, one describing the discovery of the Codex as "rather like finding a picture of St. Paul's vision of Christ on the road to Damascus, drawn by St. Luke and signed by St. Peter."

== Marian title ==
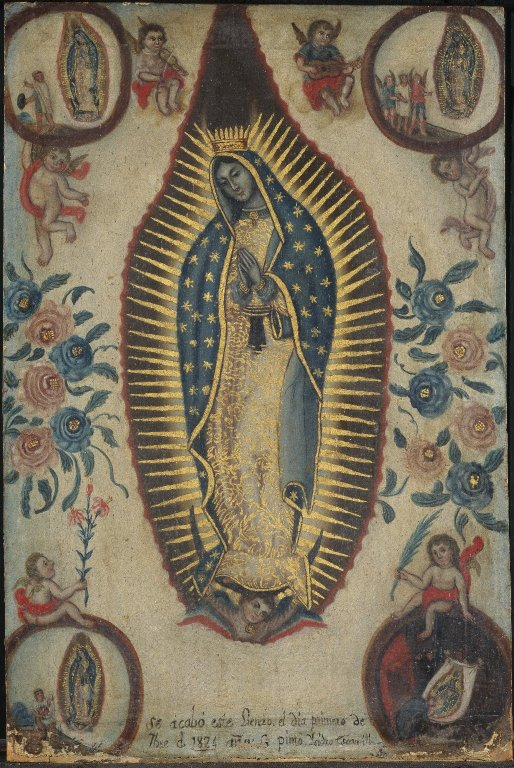
Virgin of Guadalupe, September 1, 1824. Oil on canvas by Isidro Escamilla at the Brooklyn Museum.

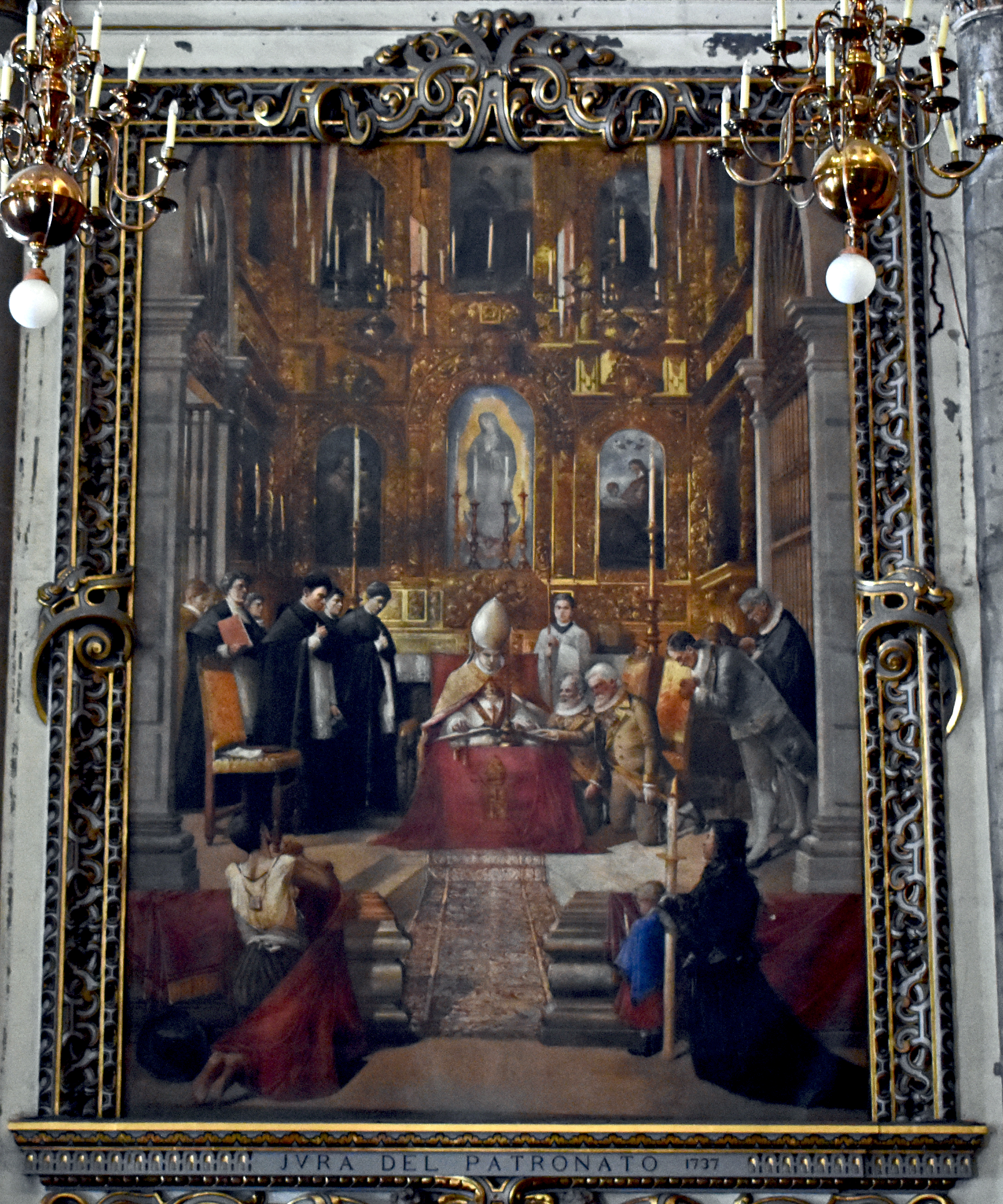
Oath of the board 1737 by Felix Parra.

In the earliest account of the apparition, the Nican Mopohua, the Virgin of Guadalupe tells Juan Bernardino, the uncle of Juan Diego, that the image on the tilma is to be known as ‘the Perfect Virgin, Holy Mary of Guadalupe.’

There have been various efforts to find a pre-Hispanic origin in the cult, including attempts to find a Nahuatl etymology to the name. The first theory to promote this Nahuatl origin was that of Luis Becerra Tanco. In his 1675 work Felicidad de Mexico, Becerra Tanco said that Juan Bernardino and Juan Diego would not have been able to understand the name Guadalupe because the "d" and "g" sounds do not exist in Nahuatl.

He proposed two Nahuatl alternative names that sound similar to "Guadalupe", Tecuatlanopeuh [tekʷat͡ɬaˈnopeʍ], which he translates as "she whose origins were in the rocky summit", and Tecuantlaxopeuh [tekʷant͡ɬaˈʃopeʍ], "she who banishes those who devoured us."

Ondina and Justo González suggest that the name is a Spanish version of the Nahuatl term, Coātlaxopeuh [koaːt͡ɬaˈʃopeʍ], which they interpret as meaning "the one who crushes the serpent", and that it may seem to be referring to the feathered serpent Quetzalcoatl. In addition, the Virgin Mary was portrayed in European art as crushing the serpent of the Garden of Eden.

Sahagún claimed that the Aztecs had previously worshiped the goddess Tonantzin (sometimes identified with Coatlícue or Cihuacoatl) at Tepeyac. He believed that the shrine to Our Lady of Guadalupe allowed them to continue their worship of Tonantzin, since they neglected other Marian shrines to come to Tepeyac.

The theory promoting the Spanish origin of the name says that:

- Juan Diego and Juan Bernardino would have been familiar with the Spanish "g" and "d" sounds since their baptismal names contain those sounds.
- There is no documentation of any other name for this Marian apparition during the almost 144 years between the apparition being recorded in 1531 and Becerra Tanco's proposed theory in 1675.
- Documents written by contemporary Spaniards and Franciscan friars argue that for the name to be changed to a native name, such as Tepeaca or Tepeaquilla, would not make sense to them, if a Nahuatl name were already in use, and suggest the Spanish Guadalupe was the original.

== Venerated image and Diego's tilma ==
=== Description ===
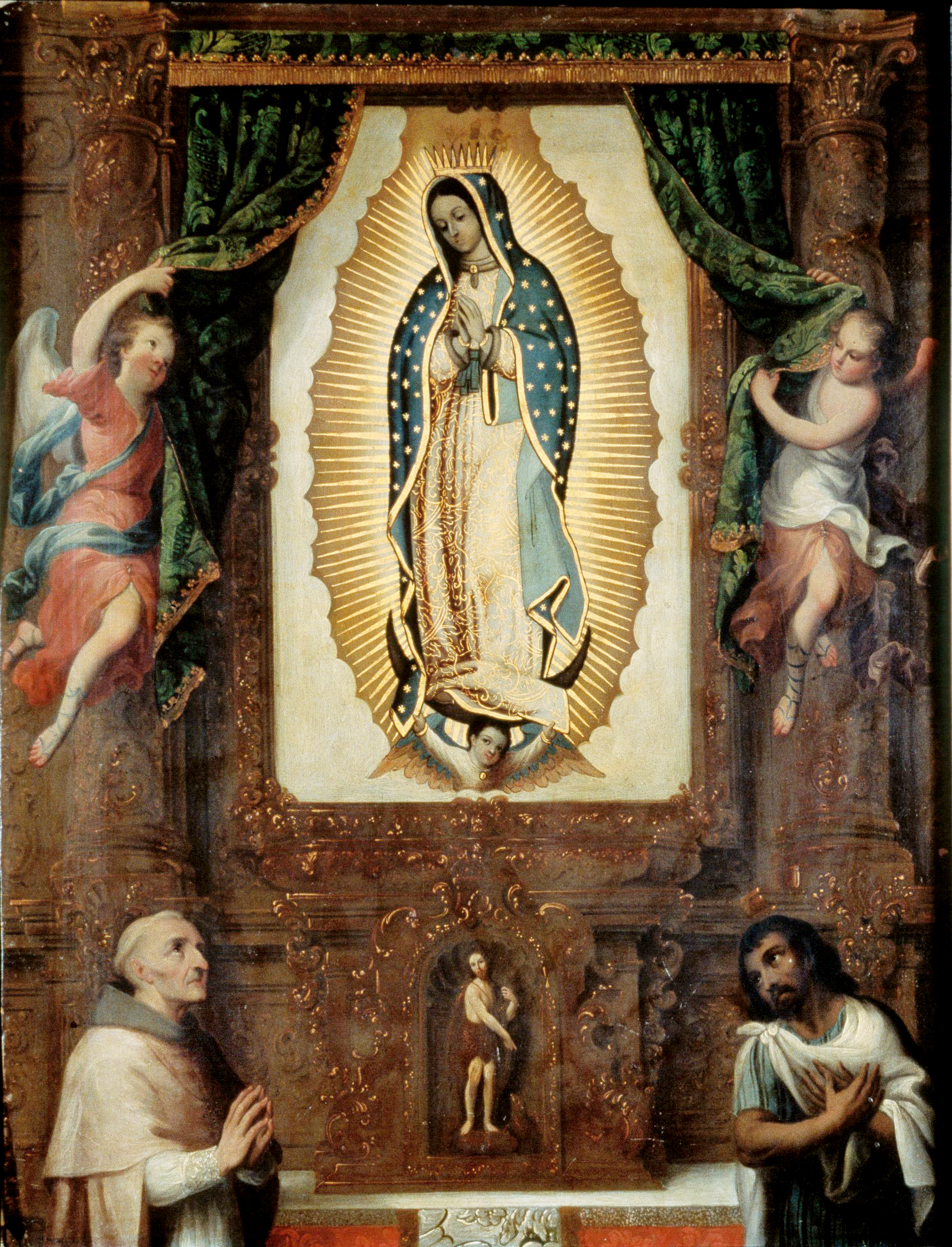
The altar image of Our Lady of Guadalupe with St. John the Baptist, Juan de Zumárraga and St. Juan Diego by Miguel Cabrera.

The image of Our Lady of Guadalupe is of a life-sized, dark-haired, olive-skinned young woman, standing with her head slightly inclined to her right, eyes downcast, and her hands held before her in prayer. She wears a pink dress ornamented with a floral design, a dark ribbon tied above her waist, and a blue-green mantle over all. The mantle is edged with gold and has golden stars throughout. She stands on a crescent moon, which is supported by an angel with eagle wings. She is surrounded by a golden sunburst.

The tilma now measures approximately 1.72 by 1.07 metres (68 by 42 in), though sources vary by a few centimeters, and it shows signs of having been trimmed from the original size. It is made of two pieces of fabric sewn together with cotton thread. There is a large crack running vertically through the middle of the image, as well as smaller horizontal cracks, caused by the image being folded at some point.

The image is currently housed in a golden frame above the main altar of the Basilica of Our Lady of Guadalupe in Mexico City, where it has been since the new basilica was completed in 1976.

=== Symbolism ===
The iconography of the Virgin is fully Catholic: Miguel Sánchez, the author of the 1648 tract Imagen de la Virgen María, described her as the Woman of the Apocalypse from the New Testament's Revelation 12:1, "clothed with the sun, and the moon under her feet, and upon her head a crown of twelve stars." She is described as a representation of the Immaculate Conception.

Virgil Elizondo says the image also had layers of meaning for the indigenous people of Mexico who associated her image with their polytheistic deities, which further contributed to her popularity. Her blue-green mantle was the color reserved for the divine couple Ometecuhtli and Omecihuatl; her belt is interpreted as a sign of pregnancy; and a cross-shaped image, symbolizing the cosmos and called nahui-ollin, is inscribed beneath the image's sash. She was called "mother of maguey", the source of the sacred beverage pulque. Pulque was also known as "the milk of the Virgin". The rays of light surrounding her are seen to also represent maguey spines.

=== Technical analyses ===
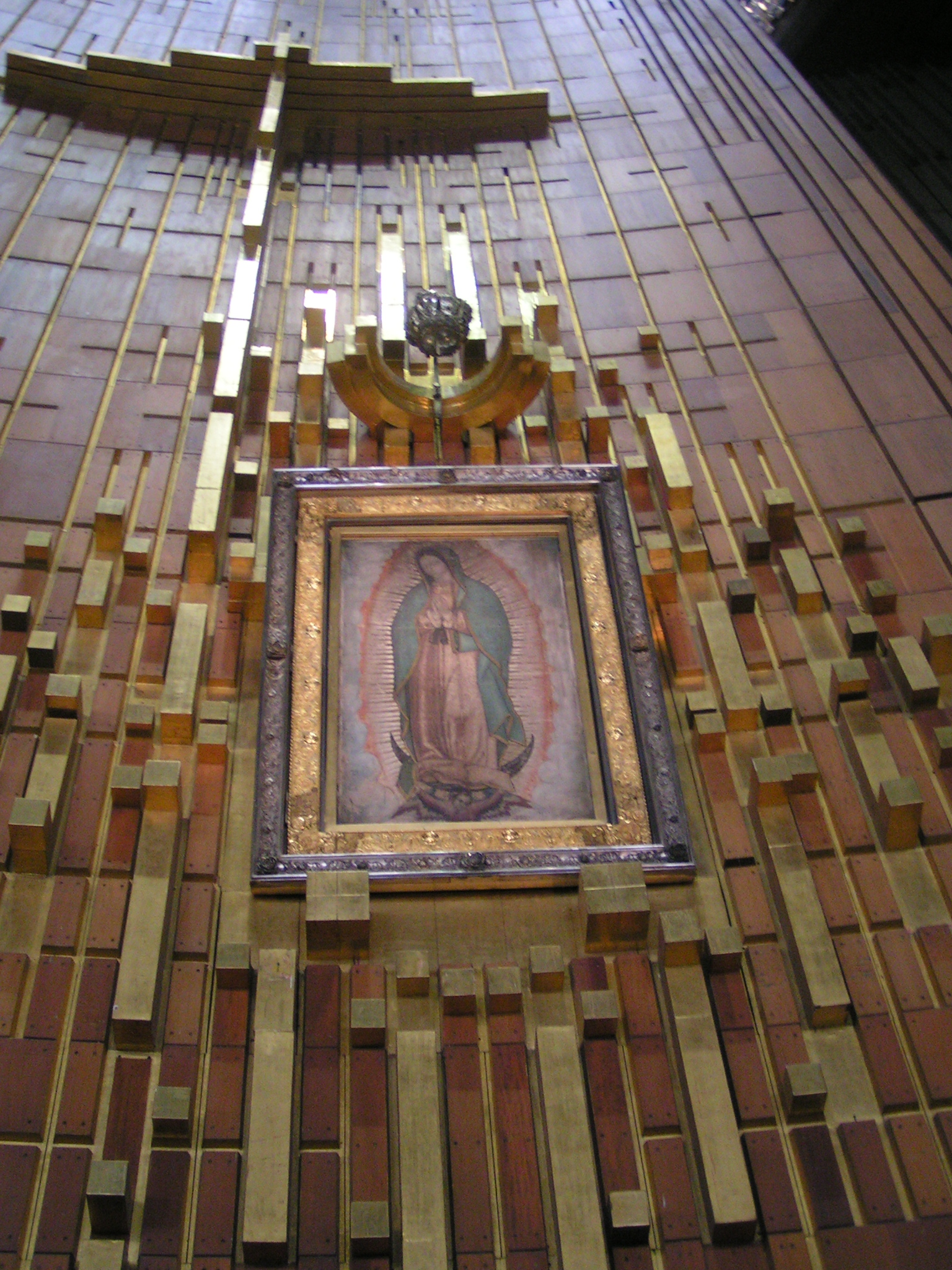
The original tilma of Juan Diego, which hangs above the high altar of the Guadalupe Basilica. The suspended crown atop the image dates back to its Canonical Coronation on October 12, 1895. The image is protected by bulletproof glass and low-oxygen atmosphere.

The image and tilma have been examined numerous times over the years.

==== Capitular inquiry ====
In 1662, canons of the cathedral in Mexico City began the process of asking for a proper liturgy for Our Lady of Guadalupe on December 12. As part of this request, Rome asked for a canonical investigation into the apparitions. The canons carried out this investigation from 1665 to 1666, including an examination of the image in March 1666.

On March 13, 1666, seven painters examined the image, accompanied by the viceroy and several clerics. The painters unanimously agreed that it was "impossible that any artist could paint and work something so beautiful, clean, and well-formed on a fabric which is as rough as is the tilma", and that the image must therefore be miraculous. They also noted the degree of preservation of the image and tilma, and that the tilma had not been prepared for painting.

On March 28, three members of the protomédico of New Spain also examined the image. They also noted how well-preserved the image was given the local climate, and saw this as evidence of the image's supernatural origin. In contrast, the silver of the moon and the gold on the sunburst, which had both been added to the original, were faded.

==== Cabrera ====
On April 30, 1751, a group of eight painters headed by José de Ibarra were allowed to examine the image. On April 15, 1752, one of the painters, Miguel Cabrera, was again allowed access to the image in order to create three copies. In 1756, Cabrera published his account of the image, approved by the other painters, entitled Maravilla Americana.

Like the previous report, Cabrera noted the preservation of the image despite the climate. He said that the tilma was two pieces of cloth sewn together, and that it felt soft, probably made of ayate fibers rather than the coarser maguey, as others had claimed. He discovered signs of four different painting techniques which he claimed had never been used in combination before. He said that the image had not been sized, and thus the image could be seen through the back of the cloth, though all but a small portion of the back was covered with silver at the time.

==== Bartolache ====
In 1787, another group of painters examined the image at the request of José Ignacio Bartolache, a doctor and mathematician. They confirmed Cabrera's opinion that the fabric of the tilma was not coarse, but determined that it was of palm fibers. Contrary to Cabrera, however, they claimed that the image had been sized beforehand, and was not visible from behind; however, four years later, two of the painters claimed that they had never seen the back of the image and did not know if it had been sized. The artists came to the conclusion that the parts of the image that were original were of divine origin, though they noted that there were some touch-ups that were clearly the work of human hands, the first study to so note.

==== Flores Gómez ====
Art restorer José Antonio Flores Gómez was hired by the abbot of the basilica to work on the image in 1947 and 1973. In a 2002 interview with the magazine Proceso, he spoke about his experience. He noted that he had not been required to keep silent about his work, but had done so of his own accord.

When he examined the image in 1947, he saw a large crack in the paint running vertically through the middle of the image, as well as some smaller horizontal cracks, which he thought were caused by the image having been folded. He also saw signs that others had touched up the image at various points. The necessity of touching up the image convinced him that it was of human origin.

Like others, Flores Gómez noted the softness of the tilma, which seemed to him more like cotton than the rougher agave traditionally claimed. He also said that the paints used in the image came from natural pigments, such as from the cochineal.

==== Callahan and Smith ====
In 1981, Philip Serna Callahan and Jody Brant Smith examined the image under infrared light, a common technique in art analysis. They were unable to find any trace of sizing or sketching underneath the paint. They concluded that, while there had been additions to and touch-ups of the image, which were in a poor state, there was no explanation for the original parts of the image or their preservation.

==== Sol Rosales ====
In 1982, Guillermo Schulenburg, abbot of the basilica, hired José Sol Rosales of the Instituto Nacional de Bellas Artes y Literatura to study the image. Sol Rosales thought that the tilma was made of linen and hemp, and not either agave or cotton. Contrary to previous claims, he said that the fabric had been prepared with white paint before the image had been painted. He saw several different styles of tempera throughout the image. He held that the paints were made from various natural pigments, and further noted that all of these pigments were commonly available in 16th-century Mexico. Like Flores Gómez, Sol Rosales saw various touch-ups and repainting throughout the image.

Sol Rosales concluded that the image was of human origin. He claimed that others, like Cabrera, had had similar findings, but concluded that the image was divine due to social pressures. Sol Rosales and his team were supervised during the investigation by Schulenburg and others. Schulenburg sent the results of this study to the Vatican, cautioning against the canonization of Juan Diego.

==== Studies on the eyes ====
Several studies have examined the eyes of the image. The authors of these studies claim that they have found images in the eyes corresponding to the people believed to have been present when Juan Diego opened his tilma before the bishop. The eyes are also claimed to contain Purkinje images exactly where they would be expected to be found in living eyes.

Critics of these studies liken the figures to inkblots and pareidolia.

== Cultural significance ==
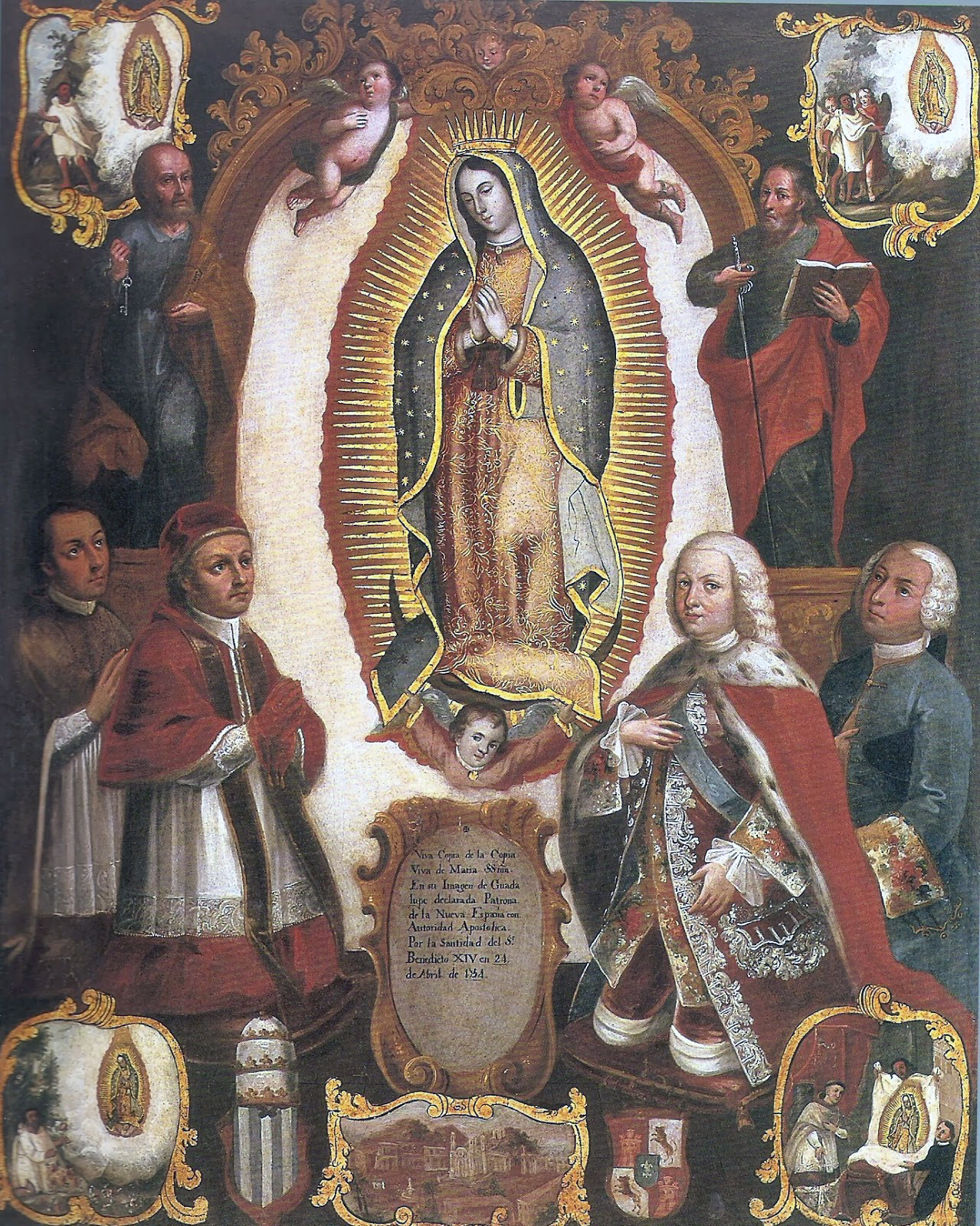
Allegory of the papal declaration in 1754 by pope Benedict XIV of Our Lady of Guadalupe patronage over New Spain in the presence of the viceroyal authorities. Anonymous (Mexican) author, 18th century.

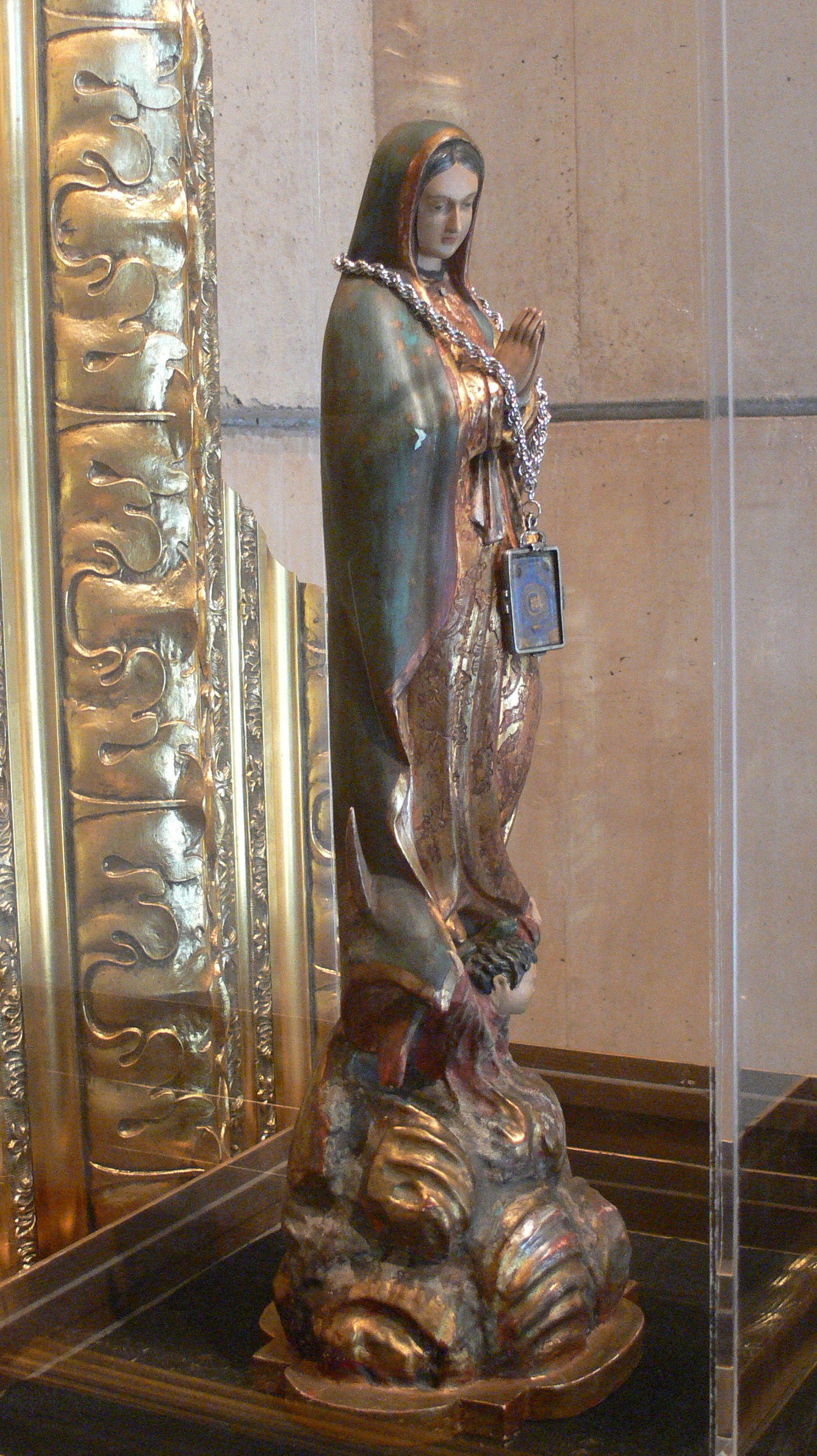
Reliquary in the Cathedral of Our Lady of the Angels in Los Angeles, United States, containing a fragment of the tilma of Juan Diego.

Juan Diego's tilma has become Mexico's most popular religious and cultural symbol and has received widespread ecclesiastical and popular veneration. In the 19th century it became the rallying cry of the Spaniards born in America, in what they denominated 'New Spain'. They said they considered the apparitions as legitimizing their own indigenous Mexican origin. They infused it with an almost messianic sense of mission and identity, thereby also justifying their armed rebellion against Spain.

=== Symbol of Mexico ===
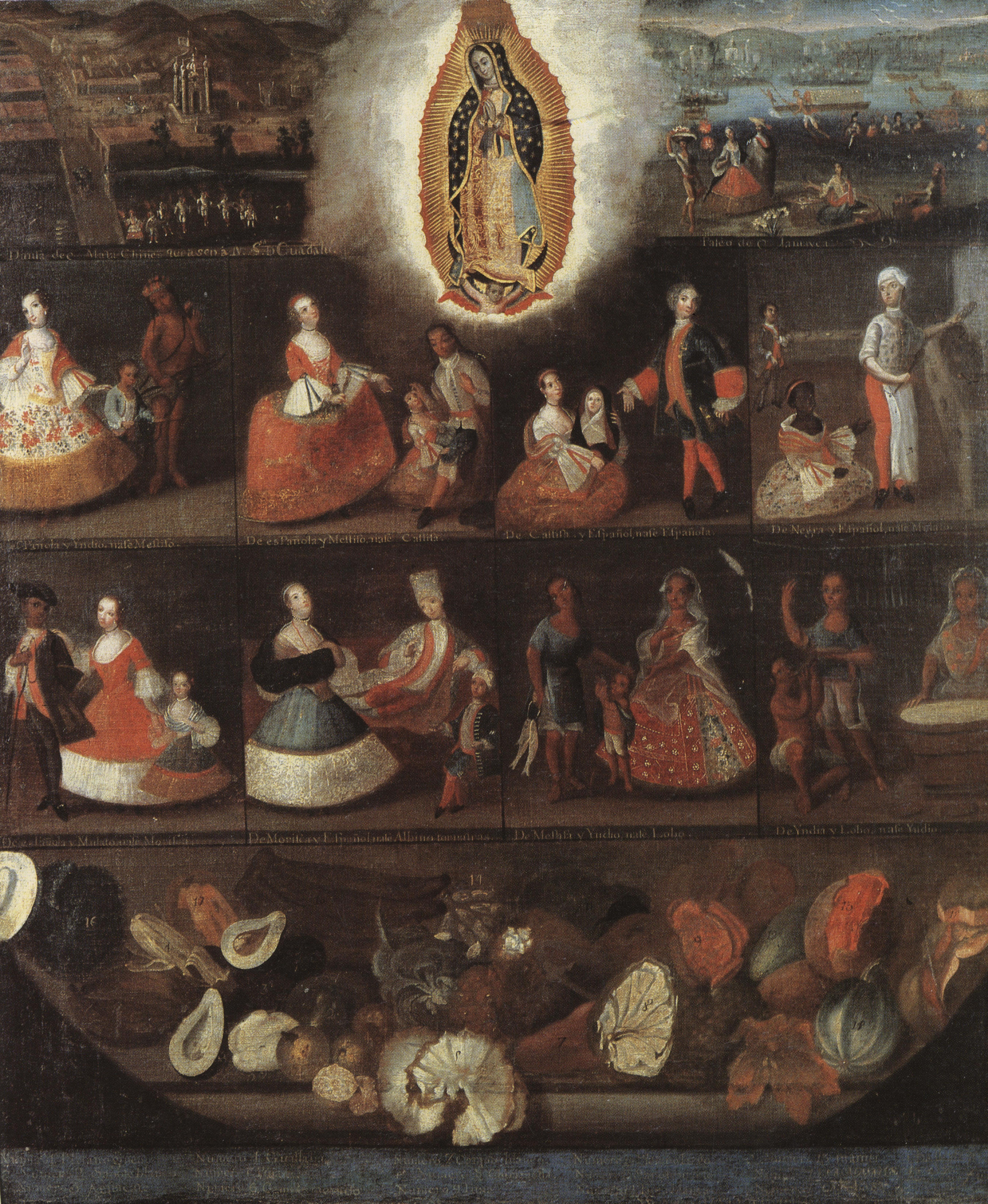
Luis de Mena, Virgin of Guadalupe and castas, 1750, a frequently reproduced painting, uniquely uniting the image Virgin and a depiction of the casta system.

Nuestra Señora de Guadalupe became a recognized symbol of Catholic Mexicans. Miguel Sánchez, the author in 1648 of the first published account of the vision, identified Guadalupe as Revelation's Woman of the Apocalypse, and said:

... this New World has been won and conquered by the hand of the Virgin Mary ... who had prepared, disposed, and contrived her exquisite likeness in this, her Mexican land, which was conquered for such a glorious purpose, won that there should appear so Mexican an image.

Throughout the Mexican national history of the 19th and 20th centuries, the Guadalupan name and image have been unifying national symbols; the first President of Mexico (1824–1829) changed his name from José Miguel Ramón Adaucto Fernández y Félix to Guadalupe Victoria in honor of the Virgin of Guadalupe. Father Miguel Hidalgo, in the Mexican War of Independence (1810), and Emiliano Zapata, in the Mexican Revolution (1910), led their respective armed forces with Guadalupan flags emblazoned with an image of Our Lady of Guadalupe. In 1999, the Church officially proclaimed her the Patroness of the Americas, the Empress of Latin America, and the Protectress of Unborn Children.

In 1810, Miguel Hidalgo y Costilla initiated the bid for Mexican independence with his Grito de Dolores, with the cry "Death to the Spaniards and long live the Virgin of Guadalupe!" When Hidalgo's mestizo-indigenous army attacked Guanajuato and Valladolid, they placed "the image of the Virgin of Guadalupe, which was the insignia of their enterprise, on sticks or on reeds painted different colors" and "they all wore a print of the Virgin on their hats." After Hidalgo's death, leadership of the revolution fell to a mestizo priest named José María Morelos, who led insurgent troops in the Mexican south. Morelos adopted the Virgin as the seal of his Congress of Chilpancingo, inscribing her feast day into the Chilpancingo constitution and declaring that Guadalupe was the power behind his victories:

New Spain puts less faith in its own efforts than in the power of God and the intercession of its Blessed Mother, who appeared within the precincts of Tepeyac as the miraculous image of Guadalupe that had come to comfort us, defend us, visibly be our protection.

Simón Bolívar noticed the Guadalupan theme in these uprisings, and shortly before Morelos's execution in 1815 wrote: "the leaders of the independence struggle have put fanaticism to use by proclaiming the famous Virgin of Guadalupe as the queen of the patriots, praying to her in times of hardship and displaying her on their flags... the veneration for this image in Mexico far exceeds the greatest reverence that the shrewdest prophet might inspire."

In 1912, Emiliano Zapata's peasant army rose out of the south against the government of Francisco Madero. Though Zapata's rebel forces were primarily interested in land reform—"tierra y libertad" ('land and liberty') was the slogan of the uprising—when his peasant troops penetrated Mexico City, they carried Guadalupan banners. More recently, the contemporary Zapatista National Liberation Army (EZLN) named their "mobile city" in honor of the Virgin: it is called Guadalupe Tepeyac. EZLN spokesperson Subcomandante Marcos wrote a humorous letter in 1995 describing the EZLN bickering over what to do with a Guadalupe statue they had received as a gift.

=== Mexican culture ===
Harringon argues that: The Aztecs... had an elaborate, coherent symbolic system for making sense of their lives. When this was destroyed by the Spaniards, something new was needed to fill the void and make sense of New Spain ... the image of Guadalupe served that purpose.

According to the traditional account, the name of Guadalupe, as the name was heard or understood by Spaniards, was chosen by the Virgin herself when she appeared on the hill outside Mexico City in 1531, ten years after the Conquest.

Guadalupe continues to be a mixture of the cultures which blended to form Mexico, both racially and religiously, "the first mestiza", or "the first Mexican", "bringing together people of distinct cultural heritages, while at the same time affirming their distinctness." As Jacques Lafaye wrote in Quetzalcoatl and Guadalupe, "as the Christians built their first churches with the rubble and the columns of the ancient pagan temples, so they often borrowed pagan customs for their own cult purposes." The author Judy King asserts that Guadalupe is a "common denominator" uniting Mexicans. Writing that Mexico is composed of a vast patchwork of differences—linguistic, ethnic, and class-based—King says "The Virgin of Guadalupe is the rubber band that binds this disparate nation into a whole." The Mexican novelist, Carlos Fuentes, once said that "you cannot truly be considered a Mexican unless you believe in the Virgin of Guadalupe." Nobel Literature laureate Octavio Paz wrote in 1974 that "The Mexican people, after more than two centuries of experiments and defeats, have faith only in the Virgin of Guadalupe and the National Lottery."

== Veneration ==
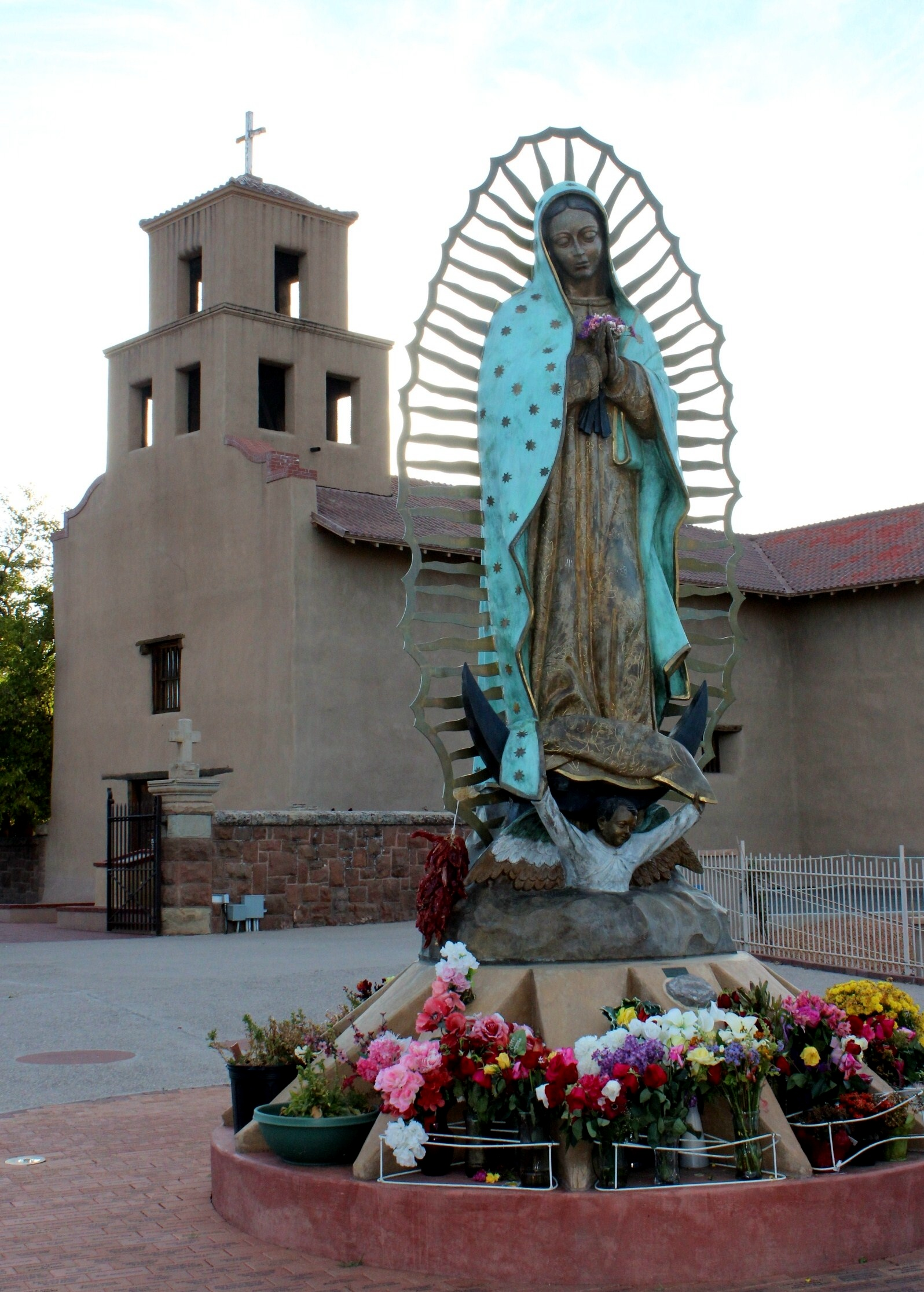
Santuario de Guadalupe is the oldest church in the United States dedicated to the Virgin of Guadalupe.

The shrine of the Virgin of Guadalupe is the most visited Catholic pilgrimage destination in the world. Over the Friday and Saturday of December 11 to 12, 2009, a record number of 6.1 million pilgrims visited the Basilica of Guadalupe in Mexico City to commemorate the anniversary of the apparition.

Religious imagery of Our Lady of Guadalupe appears in Roman Catholic parishes, especially those with Latin American heritage. In addition, due to the growth of Hispanic communities in the United States, religious imagery of Our Lady of Guadalupe has started appearing in some Lutheran, Anglican, and Methodist churches.

The Virgin of Guadalupe is considered the Patroness of Mexico and the Continental Americas; she is also venerated by Native Americans, on the account of the devotion calling for the conversion of the Americas.

Due to Mary's appearance as a pregnant mother and her claims as mother of all in the apparition, the Blessed Virgin Mary, under this title is popularly invoked as Patroness of the Unborn and a common image for the Pro-Life movement.

=== Pontifical approbations ===
- Pope Benedict XIV, in the papal bull Non est Equidem of May 25, 1754, declared Our Lady of Guadalupe patroness of what was then named "New Spain", corresponding to Spanish Central and Northern America, and included liturgical texts for the Catholic Mass and the Roman Breviary in her honor.
- Pope Leo XIII granted a decree of coronation towards the original Mexican relic on February 8, 1887, which was carried out on October 12, 1895.
- Pope Pius X declared her patroness of the Republic of Mexico on June 16, 1910, via decree Gratia quae, signed and notarized by Cardinal Rafael Merry del Val.
- Pope Pius XII mentioned the venerated image via public radio address honoring the fiftieth anniversary of its coronation on October 12, 1945.
- Pope Paul VI granted the image a Golden Rose on March 20, 1966, and consigned it to Cardinal Carlo Confalonieri as his legate, who presented it at the Basilica on May 31, 1966.
- Pope John Paul II:
  - Visited her shrine on January 27, 1979, on his first trip as pope. He was the first pope to visit the shrine. He visited again in 1990, 1999, and 2002.
  - Following his 1979 visit, he commissioned 220 digital reproductions, known as "relic images", all brought into contact with the original image and then dispatched to various locations around the world.
  - On May 12, 1992, he dedicated a namesake chapel within the grottoes under Saint Peter's Basilica at the Vatican.
  - On September 28, 2002, he included the liturgical celebration of this Marian title in the General Roman Calendar as an optional memorial for December 12.
- Pope Francis:
  - Granted the image a second Golden Rose via Cardinal Marc Ouellet for presentation at the Basilica on November 18, 2013.
  - Granted a new golden crown to the image during his apostolic visit to the Basilica on February 13, 2016.

== In political movements ==
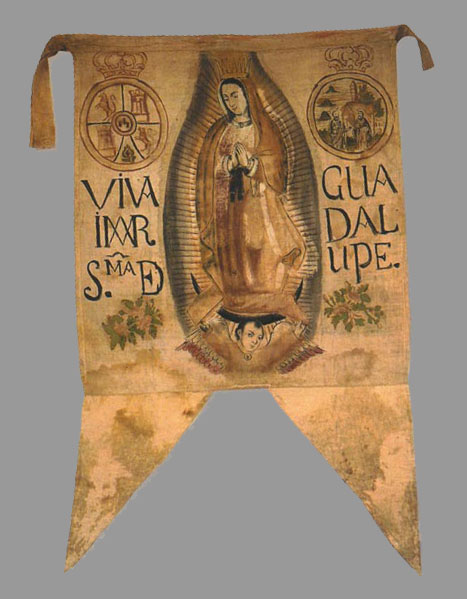
The revolutionary banner carried by Miguel Hidalgo and his insurgent army during the Mexican War of Independence.

Due to her association as a crusader of social justice, the image of Our Lady of Guadalupe has been utilized as a symbol across regions to advance political movements and mobilize the masses. For instance, the image has most notably been utilized in Mexico's Independence movement in the early 19th century, the United Farm Worker Movement in the U.S. in the 20th century and in contemporary political causes like immigration.

In Mexico's Independence, the image of Our Lady of Guadalupe became associated with the movement after Father Miguel Hidalgo rallied and united insurgents under her banner. In fact, the first president of the Mexican republic, José Miguel Ramón Adaucto Fernández y Félix, who was heavily involved in Mexico's Independence war, changed his name as to Guadalupe Victoria as a sign of devotion.

In the United Farm Workers Union (UFW), its leader, Cesar Chavez, was a devout Catholic who drew on his religious beliefs to demand for better wages and labor practices for farm workers in the U.S. He incorporated his religious beliefs in the movement by holding masses in the picket lines and prayers before meetings, and leading a pilgrimage from Delano to Sacramento in 1966 during Lent. Similarly to Mexico's Independence movement, the famous pilgrimage in 1966 that drew national attention to the cause was lead under a banner with the image of Our Lady of Guadalupe.

The image of Our Lady of Guadalupe is also present in the contemporary political discussion on immigration. Artists like Ester Hernandez and Consuelo Jimenez Underwood embed or reimagine her image on artworks that comment on immigration politics. For instance, Ester Hernandez's screen print titled Wanted (2010) and Consuelo Jimenez Underwood's Sacred Jump (1994) and Virgen de los Caminos (1994).

== In popular culture ==
Retablo final by Francisco Díaz de León, 1928.

Tepeyac from 1917 is the oldest movie about the apparitions of Guadalupe.

=== Literature and film ===
One notable reference in literature to the image and its alleged predecessor, the Aztec Earth goddess Tonantzin, is in Sandra Cisneros' short story "Little Miracles, Kept Promises", from her collection Woman Hollering Creek and Other Stories (1991). Cisneros' story is constructed out of brief notes that people give Our Lady of Guadalupe in thanks for favors received, which in Cisneros' hands becomes a portrait of an extended Chicano community living throughout Texas. "Little Miracles" ends with an extended narrative (pp. 124–129) of a feminist artist, Rosario "Chayo" de León, who at first did not allow images of La Virgen de Guadalupe in her home because she associated her with subservience and suffering, particularly by Mexican women. But when she learns that Guadalupe's shrine is built on the same hill in Mexico City that had a shrine to Tonantzin, the Aztec Earth goddess and serpent destroyer, Chayo comes to understand that there's a deep, syncretic connection between the Aztec goddess and the Mexican saint; together they inspire Chayo's new artistic creativity, inner strength, and independence. In Chayo's words: "I finally understood who you are. No longer Mary the mild, but our mother Tonantzin. Your church at Tepeyac built on the site of her temple" (128). The image and its alleged apparition was investigated several times, including in the 2013 documentary The Blood & The Rose, directed by Tim Watkins.

=== Visual arts ===
Drawing on the significance of Our Lady of Guadalupe in Chicano culture, many Chicano artists revere her image and visually reimagine the religious figure within a feminist and contemporary context. In addition to being a religious symbol, some Chicano artists view Our Lady of Guadalupe as an empowering feminist icon and a proclamation of Indigenous pride. However, these re-envisioned artworks have encountered controversy, as many artists have faced intense backlash from Catholic groups who view these artworks as "disrespectful and irreverent". One of the most famous controversies was sparked by Alma López's Our Lady digital collage, which later led to a book titled Our Lady of Controversy: Alma López's Irreverent Apparition. Chicano artists such as Yolanda López, Alma López, Margarita 'Mita' Cuaron, Ester Hernández, and Consuelo Jimenez Underwood, among others, have used Our Lady of Guadalupe's portrait to explore themes of repression, feminine strength, and to uplift women.

La Virgen morena (The Dark Virgin) is a 1942 Mexican drama film directed by Gabriel Soria.

== See also ==
- Acheiropoieta
- Cathedral of Our Lady of Guadalupe
- List of churches dedicated to Our Lady of Guadalupe
- Lord of Miracles of Buga
- Mariology
- Miracle of the roses
- Codex Cumanicus
- Huei tlamahuiçoltica
