= Ángel Sánchez Mendoza =

Ecuadorian news director (1963–2020)

Ángel Sánchez Mendoza (Guayaquil, 1963 – 30 March 2020) was an Ecuadorian journalist, news director of Ecuavisa, TC Televisión and Gamavisión as well as director of communication of Guayas Prefecture and the University of Guayaquil.

== Biography ==
Sánchez was born in 1963, and developed an interest in journalism since an early age.

He started working for Ecuavisa in the technical area, carrying lights and cables, in 1982, when he was 18 years old, also starting as a camera assistant. His first opportunity to do journalism came with Nila Velázquez in Televistazo Dominical , around 1984. He subsequently held various intermediate positions such as editor, producer, area manager, manager, among others, until he became the director of news and co-publisher of reports. He worked alongside Tania Tinoco for about thirty years, with María Teresa Arboleda with whom he had a great friendship, with the journalist Melania Quichimbo whom he married and had a daughter with, and with many of the channel's journalists for decades. Journalists Xavier Alvarado Roca, Fernando Aguayo, Teresa Arboleda, and Alberto Borges contributed to his journalistic training.

During the rebellion of the military bases of Manta, Quito and Taura, in 1986, and the kidnapping of President León Febres Cordero, Sánchez, then a production assistant, accompanied reporter María Teresa Arboleda who entered the rebel-held base; mutinous soldiers later opened fire as they were leaving. In 1997 he covered the overthrow of President Abdalá Bucaram; in 2001, while covering the September 11 attacks and the start of the US invasion of Afghanistan, he developed gastritis from overwork, and had to be hospitalized for seventeen days.

On 15 September 2011, he retired from his position as news director, as had been agreed the previous year; the channel's directors, however, required Sánchez's presence again, due to the changes of the new general manager, Mexican sociologist Luis Beltrán, who came from TC Televisión. Sánchez returned to Ecuavisa for some time, managing the news program Ecuavisa Informa, but left for good in 2013.

He then worked as news producer for TC Televisión, as well as a communications consultant and later part of the GamaTV team as producer and news director.

After spending 34 years in the media, he became director of communication for the Guayas Prefecture, since the assumption of Carlos Luis Morales, and director of communication for the University of Guayaquil.

== Private life ==
He had two children from his first marriage. He married for the second time with Melania Quichimbo, Radio City host and journalist for El Universo, with whom he had a daughter.

== Death ==
Sánchez died in the afternoon of 30 March 2020, at the age of 56, in the Guasmo Sur hospital, due to complications of the COVID-19 disease caused by the SARS-CoV-2, during the pandemic in Ecuador.
