= Juan Bernardino =

Marian visionary (ca. 1456 – 1544)

Juan Diego Bernardino (ca. 1456 – May 15, 1544) was one of three Aztec peasants alleged to have had visions of the Virgin Mary as Our Lady of Guadalupe in 1531.

== Life ==
Little is known of the life of Juan Bernardino. He lived in Tolpetlac, some nine miles north of Tenochtitlán and brought up his nephew, Juan Diego, after the latter's parents died. After the 1529 death of Juan Diego's wife, Maria Lucia, Juan Diego moved to be near his then-aged uncle in Tolpet.

== Vision of Our Lady ==
At the time of the apparitions of the Blessed Virgin Mary to Juan Diego in December 1531, Juan Bernardino fell ill. According to most sources, he contracted cocoliztli, a dreaded fever that normally led to death. On December 9, 1531, Juan Diego returned from his first two apparitions to find his uncle very ill. All that night and next day, Juan Diego tended to his uncle. Towards sunset, it became clear that Juan Bernardino was dying. Juan Diego set out at four the following morning, to bring back a priest to hear his uncle's confession and administer the last rites.

While he was gone, Juan Bernardino became too weak to drink the medicine that had been left by his bedside, and he felt he was about to die. Suddenly the room was filled with light and a beautiful radiant lady appeared to him. He immediately felt that his body had recovered from the fever, and getting up, fell to his knees before the apparition. She told him that she had met Juan Diego and sent him to the bishop with her sacred image imprinted on his tilma. It was at this apparition appearance that she identified herself as 'The Ever Virgin, Holy Mary of Guadalupe'. Some analysts believe that she actually said not de Guadalupe but te coatlaxopeuh which many scholars translate differently; "the one that originates from the cliffs", who crushes the stone serpent, "the one that has dominion of the serpent", etc.

=== Apparition to Juan Bernardino ===
(This account of the apparition occurs in the middle of the 1649 Guadalupe narrative.)

"No sooner had Juan Diego demonstrated where the Lady of Heaven ordered her temple to be built than he begged to be excused. He wanted to go home to see his uncle Juan Bernardino, who had been very ill when Juan Diego left him and went to Tlatilolco to call a priest to confess and absolve him, the one whom the Lady of Heaven had told Juan Diego that she had already healed. But they would not let Juan Diego go alone, and instead accompanied him to his home. Arriving, they saw his uncle very happy and in no pain. He was astonished to see his nephew arrive accompanied and greatly honored, and he asked his nephew the reason why they did this and conferred honors upon him. His nephew answered that when he went to call the priest to confess and prepare his uncle, the Lady of Heaven appeared to him on Tepeyacac; she, telling him not to worry since his uncle was already in good health, consoled him much, and she sent him to Mexico, to see the Bishop, so that he might build her a house on Tepeyac. His uncle revealed that it was true that she healed him then and that he saw her the same way that she appeared to his nephew,, She told him that she was also sending him to Mexico to see the Bishop. Also then the Lady told him that when he went to see the Bishop, he should reveal what he saw and in what miraculous manner she had healed him and that he would properly name her, just as he needed to name her blessed image, the ever Virgin Holy Mary of Guadalupe.

"Then they brought Juan Bernardino into the presence of the bishop, to come to inform and testify before him. The Bishop lodged both of them, him and his nephew, in his house for a few days, until the temple of Queen was built on Tepeyac, where Juan Diego had seen her. The Bishop moved into the main church the holy image of the beloved Lady of Heaven: he took it from the oratory of his palace where he was, for all people to see and admire her image."
