= Miguel Ángel Sánchez (Argentine footballer) =

Argentine footballer

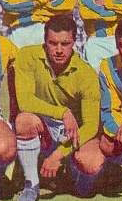

Personal information
- Full name: Miguel Ángel Sanchez
- Date of birth: September 8, 1936 (age 90)
- Place of birth: Quilmes, Buenos Aires, Argentina
- Date of death: March 26, 2008 (aged 71)
- Height: 1.80 m (5 ft 11 in)
- Position: Goalkeeper

Senior career*
Years	Team	Apps	(Gls)
1955–1958	Quilmes	68	(0)
1959–1960	Lanús	22	(0)
1961–1966	Atlanta	83	(0)
1967–1969	Quilmes	(see above)	
1970	Cúcuta Deportivo	-	
- * Club domestic league appearances and goals

Miguel Ángel Sanchez (September 8, 1936 – March 26, 2008) was an Argentine football goalkeeper who played for a number of clubs in the Argentine Primera and Cúcuta Deportivo of Colombia.

Nicknamed Teté, he played 68 games as goalkeeper for Quilmes from 1955 to 1958 and also from 1967 to 1969. For Lanús he participated in 22 games from 1959 to 1960 and for Atlanta played in 83 games. For Cúcuta Deportivo of Colombia he played more than 20 games during 1970.
