= Luis Lasso de la Vega =

Mexican priest and lawyer

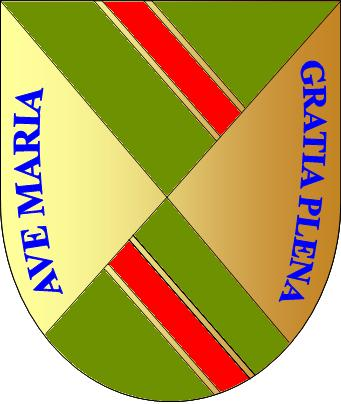
Coat of Arms of the House of Lasso de la Vega.

Luis Laso de la Vega (or Luis Lasso de la Vega) was a 17th-century Mexican priest and lawyer. He is known chiefly as the author of the Huei tlamahuiçoltica ("The Great Happening"), an account published in 1649 which contains a narrative describing the reported apparition of the Virgin Mary before Saint Juan Diego in 1531, some 117 years earlier. The account describes the appearance of the apparition now known as Our Lady of Guadalupe to Juan Diego (an indigenous convert to Roman Catholicism, whose original pre-conversion name is given as Cuauhtlatoatzin) at the hill of Tepeyac. The book was written in the Nahuatl language.

== Biography ==
Little is known about Laso de la Vega's life. He was a criollo, a Mexican-born person of full Spanish ancestry. Historians have culled from church and academic records the information that he earned a bachelor's degree and registered for a course in canon law at the University of Mexico in 1623.

He had the title of Licenciado (literally "Licensed"), generally meaning someone licensed to practice secular or canon law.

He was appointed vicar of the sanctuary of Tepeyac (near Mexico City) in 1647 and rebuilt the first chapel there, which enclosed a freshwater spring. He was promoted to the cathedral chapter in 1657. His writings demonstrate a great zeal for the Catholic faith and expertise in the Nahuatl language.

== Writings ==
Aside from narrating the apparition, the Huei tlamahuiçoltica also contained an account of miracles occurring in its wake and a prayer of devotion to the Virgin. Beside the Huei tlamahuiçoltica, Laso de la Vega also wrote a glowing review of Miguel Sánchez's Imagen de la Virgen María, Madre de Dios de Guadalupe ("Image of the Virgin Mary, Mother of God of Guadalupe"), the first written account known of the Guadalupan apparition, published the year before Laso de la Vega's tract appeared. Of Sánchez he wrote, "I and all my predecessors have been like sleeping Adams, possessing this second Eve in the paradise of their Mexican Guadalupe". Some authors have cited this passage as Laso de la Vega's admission of his debt to Sánchez for providing him a text on which to base his version of the apparition narrative.
