= Miguel Sánchez (priest) =

Novohispanic priest, writer and theologian

Miguel Sánchez (1594–1674) was a Novohispanic priest, writer and theologian. He is most renowned as the author of the 1648 publication Image of the Virgin Mary Mother of God of Guadalupe, a description and theological interpretation of an apparition to Juan Diego of the Virgin Mary as Our Lady of Guadalupe which is the first published narrative of the event. The precise nature of the cult before that date and whether the tradition as to the apparition dates back to 1531 (as Sánchez claims), constitute a vexed historical problem. The existence of a cult of the Virgin Mary at a chapel (or ermita) at Tepeyac, focussed on a painted cult image of the Virgin and enjoying a reputation for miraculous healing, was certainly established by 1556. Professor Brading, a scholar of Mexican history, noted of Sánchez: "even if he did not initiate the devotion, he determined the manner in which the image was exalted and justified."

Sánchez was born in New Spain (today's Mexico) and studied at the Royal and Pontifical University in Mexico City. He sought teaching positions but did not get them. On various occasions he served as chaplain of the chapel of Our Lady of Los Remedios, and in 1662 he joined an archconfraternity of secular priests which was later constituted as the first Oratory of Saint Philip Neri in Mexico.

His work makes use of the typology of Augustine of Hippo, although applying it not to events in the New Testament but rather to events alleged to have occurred the previous century in Mexico.

He was buried at the sanctuary of the Virgin at Guadalupe, having been her lifelong devotee and the first of the "four evangelists" of the Guadalupan apparition.

== See also ==
Luis Lasso de la Vega
