= Codex Escalada =

Nahuatl-language parchment related to the Guadalupe apparitions

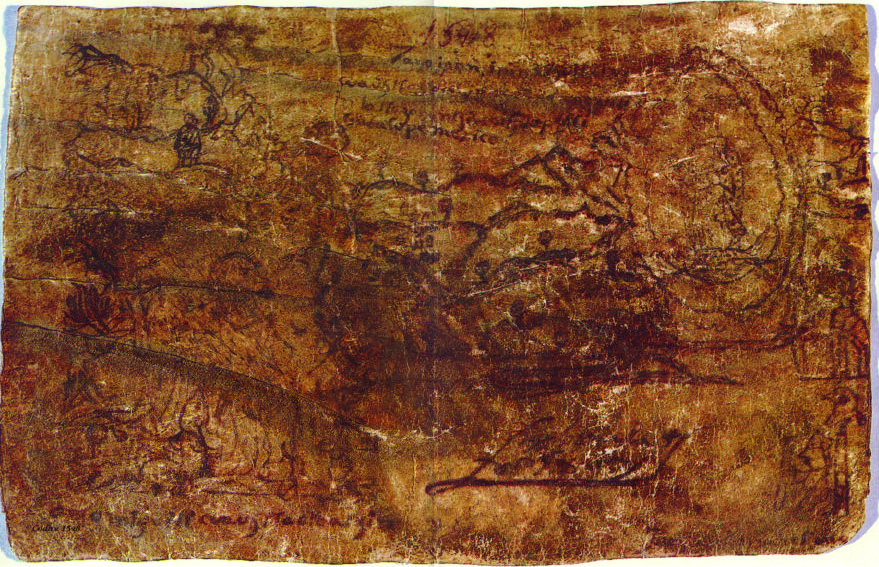
The Codex Escalada

Codex Escalada (or Codex 1548) is a sheet of parchment signed with a date of "1548", on which there have been drawn, in ink and in the European style, images (with supporting Nahuatl text) depicting the Marian apparition of Our Lady of Guadalupe to Juan Diego which allegedly occurred on four separate occasions in December 1531 on the hill of Tepeyac north of central Mexico City. If authentic, and if correctly dated to the mid-16th century (as tests so far conducted indicate), the document fills a gap in the documentary record as to the antiquity of the tradition regarding those apparitions and of the image of the Virgin associated with the fourth apparition which is venerated at the Basilica of Guadalupe. The parchment first came to light in 1995, and in 2002 was named in honour of Fr. Xavier Escalada S.J. who brought it to public attention and who published it in 1997.

== Description ==
The document is not a codex as the term is generally understood, but rather a single sheet of parchment (approximately 13.3 by 20 cm, or 5¼ x 8 inches) prepared from what is probably deerskin. In Mesoamerican studies, the word "codex" is applied to every type of pictorial manuscript, irrespective of form, executed in the indigenous tradition. The codex Escalada bears several significant creases both lengthwise and laterally, and the edges are abraded which, together with a deep yellowish patina, impedes a clear reading of it; however, the main features can be distinguished.

The principal image consists of a rocky landscape dotted with sparse scrub flanked on the left by an Indian kneeling at the foot of a mountain and facing in three-quarter profile across the plain towards the Virgin who, in turn, flanks the landscape on the right. She is contained within a nebulous mandorla, and at her feet are traces of what seems to be a horned moon. This depicts the apparition which is said to have occurred on 12 December 1531 on the hill of Tepeyac located six kilometers (four miles) north of the main plaza of Mexico City. The Sun is rising over the hills behind the Virgin.

Above the central landscape is the date "1548" beneath which are four lines of Nahuatl text written in the Latin alphabet which can be translated as: "In this year of 15[0]31 there appeared to Cuauhtlatoatzin our dearly beloved mother Our Lady of Guadalupe in Mexico". Below the landscape and a little off-centre to the right, is the imposing signature of Fray Bernardino de Sahagún (ca. 1499-1590), the renowned Franciscan missionary, historian and pioneering ethnologist. High in the cliffs above the kneeling Indian is a much smaller depiction of a man on the hill. Directly beneath the kneeling Indian is more Nahuatl text written in the Latin alphabet, the first part of which can be translated as: "Cuauhtlatoatzin died a worthy death"; and the second as: "in 1548 Cuauhtlatoatzin died." From other sources, this is known to be the native name of Juan Diego, although the normal orthography for the mid-16th century is "Quauhtlahtoatzin". It is these last details which have led the parchment to be regarded as a type of "death certificate" of Juan Diego.

The right margin of the parchment constitutes a distinct register of images. The top half is a continuation of the landscape, below which is an indistinct rectilinear image. Below that again, and in the extreme right-hand corner, is a left-facing pictogram in the indigenous style of a man brandishing an upright staff while seated on a ceremonial chair. The chair is surmounted by a glyph depicting the head of a bird from which streams flow. Beneath this pictogram are the words "juez anton vareliano [sic]" taken to be a reference to Antonio Valeriano (ca. 1525-1605). Valeriano was juez-gobernador (or judge-governor) of his home town of Azcapotzalco from 1565 to 1573, and of San Juan Tenochtitlan thereafter, and he had been a pupil and later associate of Sahagún in the compilation of an encyclopedic account of Nahua life and culture before the Spanish conquest assembled between approximately 1540 and 1585 and known most famously through the Florentine Codex.

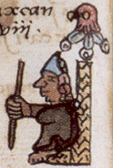
Pictogram of Antonio Valeriano in the Aubin Codex

The pictogram of Valeriano is very close to one of him extant on the Aubin Codex in the British Museum, which probably dates from 1576, hence its alternative name of "manuscrito de 1576". The purpose and function of Sahagún's signature and of the Valeriano pictogram remain uncertain.

== Iconography ==
The disposition of Juan Diego and the Virgin on the parchment and their physical attributes are paralleled to some extent by an engraving by Antonio Castro which ornaments the second (and posthumous) edition of a work by Luis Becerra Tanco first published in Mexico in 1666 as Origen milagroso del santuario de Nuestra Señora de Guadalupe and republished in Spain in 1675 as Felicidad de México. The iconography of the Virgin on the parchment is notable for the absence of three features which have been an enduring part of the image: the aureole or golden rays framing her, the crown on her head, and the angel with folded cloth at her feet. The first and last features are still visible in the image preserved in the Basilica of Guadalupe on what is said to be Juan Diego's tilma or mantle, but the crown had disappeared by 1895, in circumstances which remain obscure. All three features can be seen in the earliest known representation of the tilma, painted in oil on panel dated 1606 and signed Baltasar de Echave Orio. A sequence of marks on the fringe of the Virgin's mantle falling down over her left shoulder have been interpreted as stars but (as with the possible moon) are too vestigial to permit a secure identification. Following an infrared and ocular study of the tilma in 1979, Philip Callahan concluded that the moon, angel with folded cloth, aureole, and stars, were all later additions to the original image, made probably in that order beginning at an indeterminate time in the 16th century and perhaps continuing into the early 17th century.

== Circumstances of its publication, ownership and location ==
The parchment first came to public notice in August 1995 when Father Escalada – a Spanish Jesuit and long-time resident of Mexico who had devoted his life to Guadalupan studies and who was at that time preparing for the press his Enciclopedia Guadalupana – announced that the owners of the parchment had brought it to his attention while at the same time requesting that their identity remain confidential. The original announcement came almost midway between the beatification and the canonization of Juan Diego in 1990 and 2002 respectively, and the parchment helped to allay doubts in some quarters about the historicity both of Juan Diego himself, and of the antiquity of the tradition as to the apparitions. Before the discovery of the parchment, the earliest documented reference to Juan Diego which has survived had been Miguel Sánchez's Imagen de la Virgen María, published in Mexico in 1648. Nevertheless, the parchment contributes no previously unknown facts relative to Juan Diego or the apparitions, for his native name and the year of his death were already known from other sources, as was the role of Valeriano in promoting the cult of Our Lady of Guadalupe (if, indeed, the Nican Mopohua is to be attributed to him, as it traditionally has been, recent tentative challenges notwithstanding).

Escalada subsequently issued (in 1997) an 80-page appendix to his Enciclopedia Guadalupana containing photographs of the Codex and a presentation of the scientific study of its authenticity.

== Provenance ==
One José Antonio Vera Olvera found the parchment, by chance, enclosed in a manila envelope and lodged between the pages of a 19th century devotional work on sale in a second-hand book market, and from him it passed to the Guerra Vera family of Querétaro who revealed its existence to Escalada in 1995. On the occasion of the formal donation of the parchment to the Archbishop of México on 14 April 2002, the owners requested that it be known as the Codex Escalada in honour of Escalada's life-work researching the apparitions. Escalada died in October 2006.

== Doubts and suspicions ==
In 1996 and 1997 the parchment and Sahagún's signature were subjected to technical and critical analysis the results of which were all favourable to the document's authenticity (see below under Investigations as to authenticity). Nevertheless, the owners' initial stipulation for anonymity added an air of mystery to what was already a highly fortuitous discovery both as to its timing and as to the nature and amount of the historical data to which it seemingly attests, although it was not the only such discovery in or around this period which aided the case for the historicity of Juan Diego. Baltasar de Echave Orio's painting of 1606 has already been mentioned in this regard. To this can be added the discovery by Eduardo Chávez Sánchez in July 2001 of a copy (dated 14 April 1666) of the original translation of the Informaciones Juridicas de 1666, formerly known only from a copy dated 1737 and first published by Hipólito Vera Fortino in 1889. In April 2002, on the eve of the canonization of Juan Diego, the owners waived their right to anonymity and, in a public ceremony, donated the parchment to the Archbishop of Mexico, since then it has been kept in the Historical Archives of the Basilica of Guadalupe.

Some scholars found the mode and timing of the discovery suspicious and the convergence of data on it little short of miraculous. The puzzling features which require elucidation and explanation were gathered by one eminent Mexican scholar (Rafael Tena) under six headings as follows: provenance (his comments predated the release of new information in 2002, as to which see under Provenance above); materials analysis (where Tena urged destructive investigatory techniques despite the document's exiguous dimensions); art-historical criticism (including orthography); graphology (where Tena, despite Dibble's expert opinion, expressed the view that access to the original is indispensable for a conclusive attribution of Sahagún's signature); historiography (where Tena contends the codex must post-date 1573 when Valeriano was appointed juez gobernador of Tenochtitlan, and that Sahagún's signature on the codex is irreconcilable with his known opposition to the cult – as to which, see below); and finally linguistic analysis.

While many of the puzzling features have still not been fully explained or accounted for (including alleged anachronisms which presume that the date 1548 is the date of composition as opposed to the date of record), and while further tests can be devised, no critics have impugned (i) the integrity and expertise of those who have subjected the document to investigation, or (ii) (subject to reservations over Dibble's lack of access to the original) the reliability and coherence of such tests and investigations as were actually performed or conducted, or (iii) the conclusions drawn from the results of those tests and investigations. Rafael Tena, among others, contended that even if Sahagún's signature is authentic, its presence on a document such as this constitutes a serious internal inconsistency arising from Sahagún's known hostility to the cult of Guadalupe.e.g., Peralta, quoting from Book 11 of Sahagün's Historia General de las Cosas de la Nueva España. While Sahagún did indeed express reservations as to the cult in his historical works, that comparatively late criticism was based on what he considered to be a syncretistic application to the Virgin Mary of the Nahuatl epithet "Tonantzin" ("our dear mother") which, however, he himself had freely used with the same application in his own sermons as late as the 1560s.

Brian Dunning of Skeptoid, similarly brings attention to the suspicious timing of the discovery, when debates about Juan Diego's canonization and historicity were being questioned, describing it as the perfect "tailor-made evidence". Commonweal, a Catholic journal of opinion, described the codex as questionable evidence, commenting that it is full of anachronisms and errors, possibly being a nineteenth-century forgery. They claimed that more than 40 documents said to attest to the figure of Juan Diego, do not withstand historical criticism.

== Investigations as to authenticity ==
=== Materials and inks ===
The parchment was consigned by Escalada to a team of 18 experts of various disciplines assembled at the Centro de Física Aplicada y Tecnología Avanzada UNAM (Querétaro campus) and coordinated by Professor Victor Manuel Castaño, who subjected it to a range of non-destructive tests to determine the age, authenticity and integrity of the materials. In their report issued on 30 January 1997 they concluded that the parchment and inks were consistent with an origin in the 16th century and that there was sufficient evidence to conclude that the document itself was of 16th century origin. More than ten years after the tests, Castaño noted that the team operated under time constraints (although he gives no indication as to their origin, or how urgent they were). He also adverted to the impermissibility of subjecting the sample to destructive tests which prevented a conclusive assessment, but he conceded that the creativity and ingenuity of the team members – who worked in groups deliberately isolated from each other in order that their conclusions might all be arrived at independently – sufficiently overcame these limitations as to permit them the conclusions at which they did arrive.

=== Sahagún's signature ===
A copy of the signature as it appears on the parchment was sent to Dr. Charles E. Dibble, a former distinguished professor of anthropology of the University of Utah and one of the leading scholars in Sahagún studies. In a letter of 12 June 1996 he wrote: "I have received a copy of codice 1548. I have studied the signature, and I believe it to be the signature of Fray Bernardino de Sahagún. I base my conclusions on the indications of three crosses; the form of the 'Fray', the 'd' and the 'b'. In my opinion the signature is not the same as, that is not contemporaneous with the 1548 date of the codice. I would assign the signature to the 50s or the 60s." In his report of 18 September 1996, Don Alfonso M. Santillana Rentería, head of the Office of Documentoscopy and Photography of the Bank of Mexico in Mexico City, verified Sahagún's signature in these terms: " . . la firma cuestionada, atribuida a Fray Bernardino de Sahagún, que aparece en el Códice 1548, fue hecha por su puño y letra; por lo tanto es auténtica." (the signature in question, attributed to Fray Bernardino de Sahagún, which appears on codex 1548, was made by his own hand; therefore it is authentic.) Professor Castaño's team identified the ink used for Sahagún's signature (as they also did with the ink used for the date "1548") as being not identical with that used on the rest of the parchment.

The results of all these analyses and investigations were published by Escalada in July 1997 as an 80-page fifth volume or appendix to his Enciclopedia Guadalupana, complete with photographs and technical data.
