= Schulenberg =

Schulenberg may refer to:

== Places ==
- Schulenberg im Oberharz, Lower Saxony, Germany
- Schulenburg, Texas, US

== People ==
- Guillermo Schulenberg (1916–2009), Mexican Christian monk
- Ralf Schulenberg (born 1949), East German footballer
