= Marcos Cipac de Aquino =

Mexican artist

Marcos Cipac de Aquino (?–1572), informally known as Marcos the Indian, was a Nahuatl artist in sixteenth-century New Spain and is the purported painter of the image of the Virgin of Guadalupe.

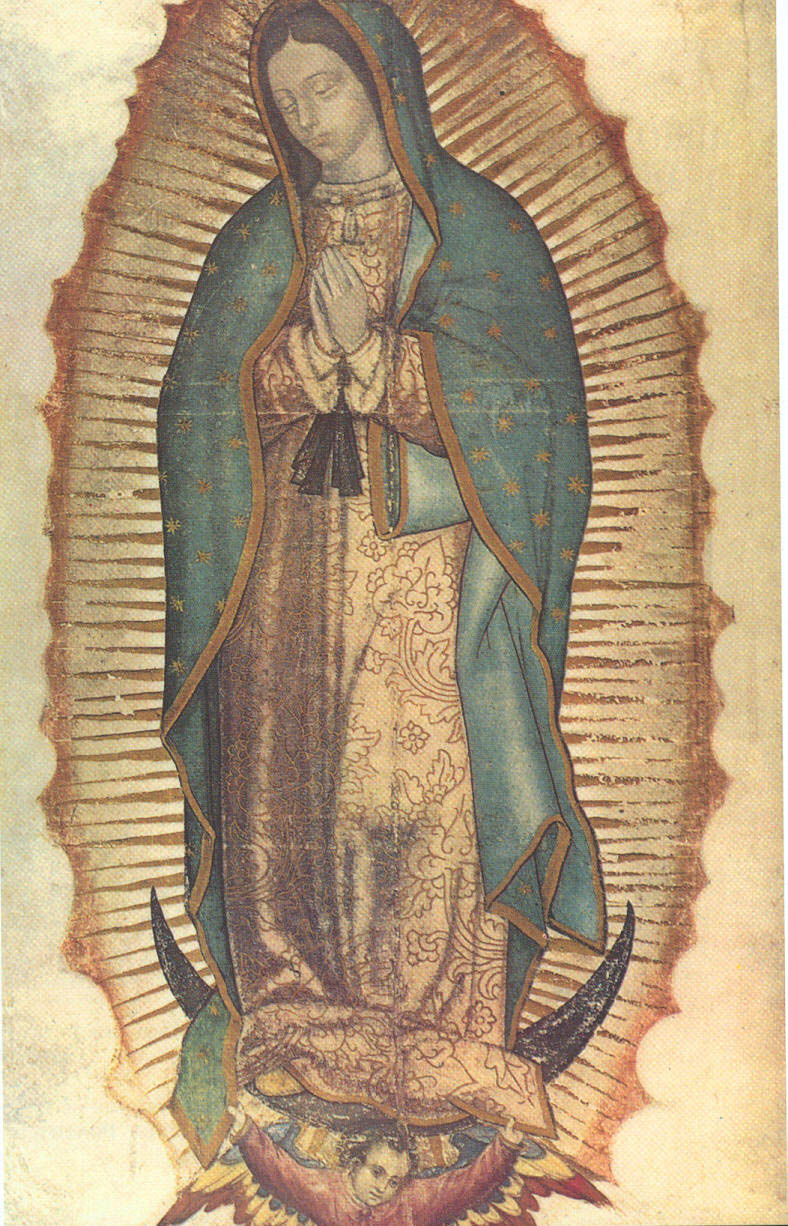
The tilma painting of Guadalupe, Marcos Cipac de Aquino is proposed as being its creator.

Art historian Jeanette Favrot Peterson has ventured, "Marcos Cipac (de Aquino) was the artist of the Mexican Guadalupe, capable of executing a large Marian painting on cloth within a professional milieu that was abundantly stock to stimulate his innate artistry." The basis of her conjecture is evidence in the Anales de Juan Bautista, a manuscript housed in the Biblioteca Boturini of the Basilica of Guadalupe, translated and published in 2001.

Mexican scholars of the nineteenth century posited the painting's artist as Marcos Cipac de Aquino, including Joaquín García Icazbalceta in his Carta acerca del Origen de la Imagen de Nuestra Sra. de Guadalupe (1883) and Francisco del Paso y Troncoso's Noticia del indio Marcos y de otros pintores del siglo XVI (1891).

In the 1576 book Historia verdadera de la conquista de la Nueva España by Bernal Díaz del Castillo, a contemporary of Marcos Cipac de Aquino, the author writes on page 233:

Even at this day there are living in Mexico three Indian artists, named Marcos de Aquino, Juan de la Cruz, and El Crespello, who have severally reached to such great proficiency in the art of painting and sculpture, that they may be compared to an Apelles, or our contemporaries Michael Angelo and Berruguete.

Marcos de Aquino is also credited with the painting by Leoncio Garza-Valdés on the basis of a scientific investigation.

While agreed upon that the tilma is a 16th century painting created by an indigenous American or workshop involving Nahua artists at Colegio de Santa Cruz de Tlatelolco, there is some skepticism about the identification of it with Marcos Cipac de Aquino—though he is the most cited candidate. A document called Informaciones 1556 and published in 1888 states that on September 8, 1556, the feast of the Nativity of Mary, at the end of the sermon that Bustamante gave in the chapel of San José in the convent of San Francisco in Mexico, Francisco de Bustamante attacked Archbishop Montúfar for having, according to the former, encouraged a devotion that had arisen around an image "painted yesterday by the Indian Marcos."
