= Informaciones Jurídicas de 1666 =

Informaciones Jurídicas de 1666 (English: The Proceedings of 1666) is a Spanish document that helped support the apparition of the Virgin Mary to Juan Diego Cuauhtlatoatzin at the hill of Tepeyac in 1531. The apparition is also known today as the iconic Virgin of Guadalupe. The Proceedings of 1666 consist of a series of investigations, record examinations, testimonies from artists, physicians, and Aztec historians, and oral accounts from elderly men and women who had knowledge and experience with Juan Diego and his contemporaries.

== Background ==
As soon as Bishop Zumárraga and his subordinates viewed Juan Diego's miraculous tilma painting on December 12, 1531, devotion to Our Lady of Guadalupe began. News about the apparition became widespread and many people came to visit the cathedral that would temporarily house the painting. According to Miguel Sánchez's account of the apparition, when the painting was placed in the cathedral church, “all the city learned of it; and everyone was moved to such a degree that all wanted to see face to face this Miracle so new; and devotion hurried everyone to come together in Christian gatherings.” It would become so popular in the surrounding areas that a hermitage was quickly held on December 26, 1531. This special devotion became such an important part of Mexican life that the local priests began to think about how to ask permission from the Pope for a special Mass and proper office for celebrating the feast of Our Lady of Guadalupe. Unfortunately, little was done about this until Francisco Siles proposed a new plan to Juan Francisco Leiva y de la Cerda, the Viceroy of New Spain in 1663.

== Testimony of the painters ==
This group of painters consisted of Juan Salguero, Tomás Conrado, Sebastián López de Avalos, Nicolás de Angulo, Juan Sánchez and Alonso se Zarate. These men were well-known, acclaimed artists, and were considered to be masters of painting. After examining the tilma painting, they all came to the conclusion that it was “impossible that any human artist could have painted or created a work so smooth and outstanding and beautifully formed on a fabric so coarse and rough as the tilma.” In addition, these men found that the tilma was painted from the reverse side of the fabric and could not determine whether the painting was done with oil or tempera paints and declared that only the “Lord [their] God alone knows the secret of this work.”

== Testimony of the physicians ==
The three physicians called in to examine the image were Don Luis de Cádenas Soto, Don Jerónimo Ortiz, and Don Juan de Malgarejo who were all Physicians-Royal of Mexico. They were brought in to observe how the colors on the tilma could still be so bright after 135 years. They declared that the damp and salty air from Lake Texcoco in conjunction with the hot and humid climate should have caused de-lustering of the image and caused it to dull. On March 28, 1666, the three men declared that the brightness of the image colors could not be explained by natural means.

== Mexican-Indian notable testimonies ==
1. Marcos Pacheco- An 80-year-old man who was the mayor of Cuautitlán (Juan Diego's birthplace) two times. He learned of the apparition from many especially his aunt María Pacheco. His age indicates that he was born fifty-five years after the apparitions.
2. Gabriel Suárez- A man who claimed to be more than 110-years-old and was aided by the help of four interpreters. In Suarez's account, he claimed that he was born in Tequixquinahua and heard all about the account of the apparition from his father Mateo who personally knew Juan Diego. He also heard it from many of the townspeople “who were alive at the time of the Apparitions and attended the ceremonies of the First Procession [and] knew many who had gone to the Hermitage to ask Juan Diego to pray for them.”
3. Andrés Juan- A native of Cuautitlán who was believed to be even older than Gabriel Suarez. In his testimony, he claimed that “his family took him to the Hermitage over a hundred years ago, and that the Painting is the one that is now in the new church.” He also claimed that his life was prolonged because the Virgin wanted him to validate her apparition.
4. Doña Juana de la Concepción- The 85-year-old daughter of governor Don Lorenzo de San Francisco Haxtlatzontli. In her testimony, Juana claimed that her father made picture chronicles known as mapas and that he carefully compiled all that happened in his section of Mexico. This included the apparition of Our Lady of Guadalupe because he had known both Juan Diego and his uncle Juan Bernardino. Unfortunately, some thieves broke into his ranch and stole these mapas along with most of his possessions. According to Juana everything that her father put down about the apparition was “heard [by her father] when he was fifteen years old from the mouth of Juan Diego himself, and he portrayed it exactly as Juan Diego had told him.”
5. Don Pablo Xuárez- The 78-year-old governor of Cuautitlán. Testified that his grandmother Justina Cananea personally knew Juan Diego, his wife Maria Lucía, and his uncle Juan Bernardino and that she told him everything about the apparition. He also claimed the miracle “was so public and well-known, how it all happened, that even the children sang all about it in their games.”

== Spanish priest testimonies ==
1. Fray Antonio de Mendoza- A 77-year-old Augustinian priest of Spanish descent. Heard about the apparition from his parents and grandparents who all lived to be old. His grandfather Alonso de Mendoza was the Spanish captain of the guard around 1580 and knew many people who lived in Mexico at the time when the miracle occurred.
2. Diego de Monroy- A 75-year-old Spanish Jesuit priest. Claimed that after 40 years in Mexico “he had never heard from anyone any variation or doubt expressed.”

== Significance ==
According to A.M. Sada Lambretón, the Proceedings of 1666 are very important as proof of the Guadalupe tradition and as support to the life, virtues, reputation and holiness and cult of Blessed Juan Diego. This collection of documents was reviewed during Juan Diego's canonization in 2002. After a revival of the proceedings in 1723 by Bishop José Pérez de Lanciego Aguilar, the Office of Our Lady of Guadalupe was formally approved in 1894.
