= Tilmàtli =

Outer garment worn by men in Aztec Mexico

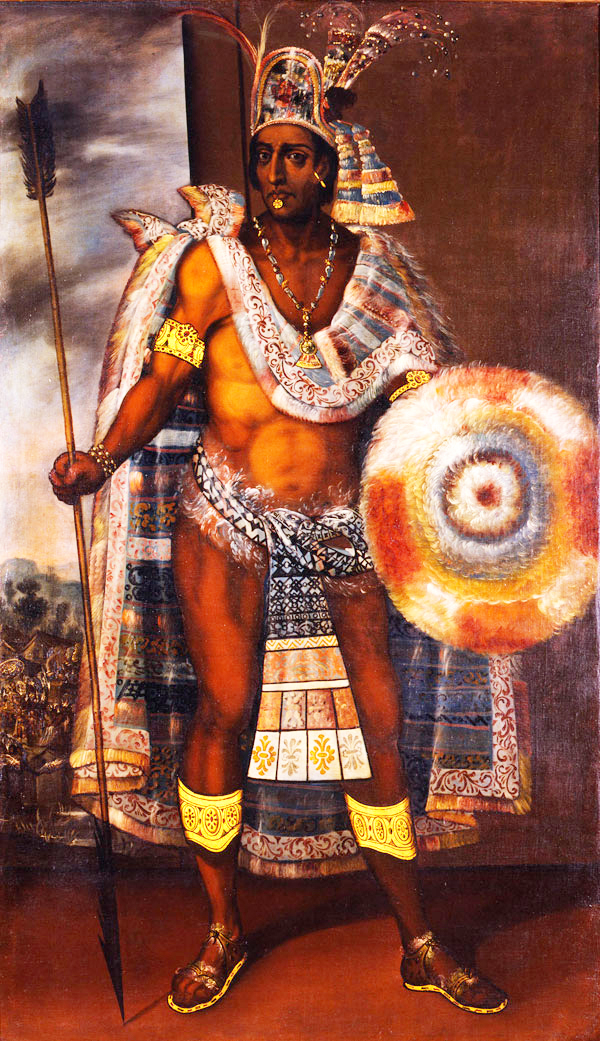
Emperor Moctezuma II wearing a tilmàtli.

A tilmàtli (or tilma; Classical Nahuatl: tilmahtli, Classical Nahuatl pronunciation: [tilmaʔtɬi]) was a type of outer garment worn by men as a cloak/cape, documented from the late Postclassic and early Colonial eras among the Aztec and other peoples of central Mexico.

== Styling ==
The garment was to be worn at the front like a long apron, or alternatively draped across the shoulders as a cloak. It was also frequently used as a carry-all.

== Significance ==
Several different types of the garment were in use, designed for the various classes in society. Upper classes wore a tilmàtli of cotton cloth knotted over the right shoulder, while the middle class used a tilmàtli made of ayate fibre, a coarse fabric derived from the threads of the maguey agave. It was knotted over the left shoulder. The lower classes knotted the garment behind the neck, where it could serve for carrying.

Varieties of tilmàtli worn by Aztec men, before the Spanish conquest, signifying their social positions: a: a young person wearing only a maxtlatl b: a common person (Macehualtin) dress c: a noble (Pipiltin) or high ranking warrior dress d: dress of the ruling classes and the clergy e: a less common way to wear the tilmàtli f: war dress.

== Miraculous image ==
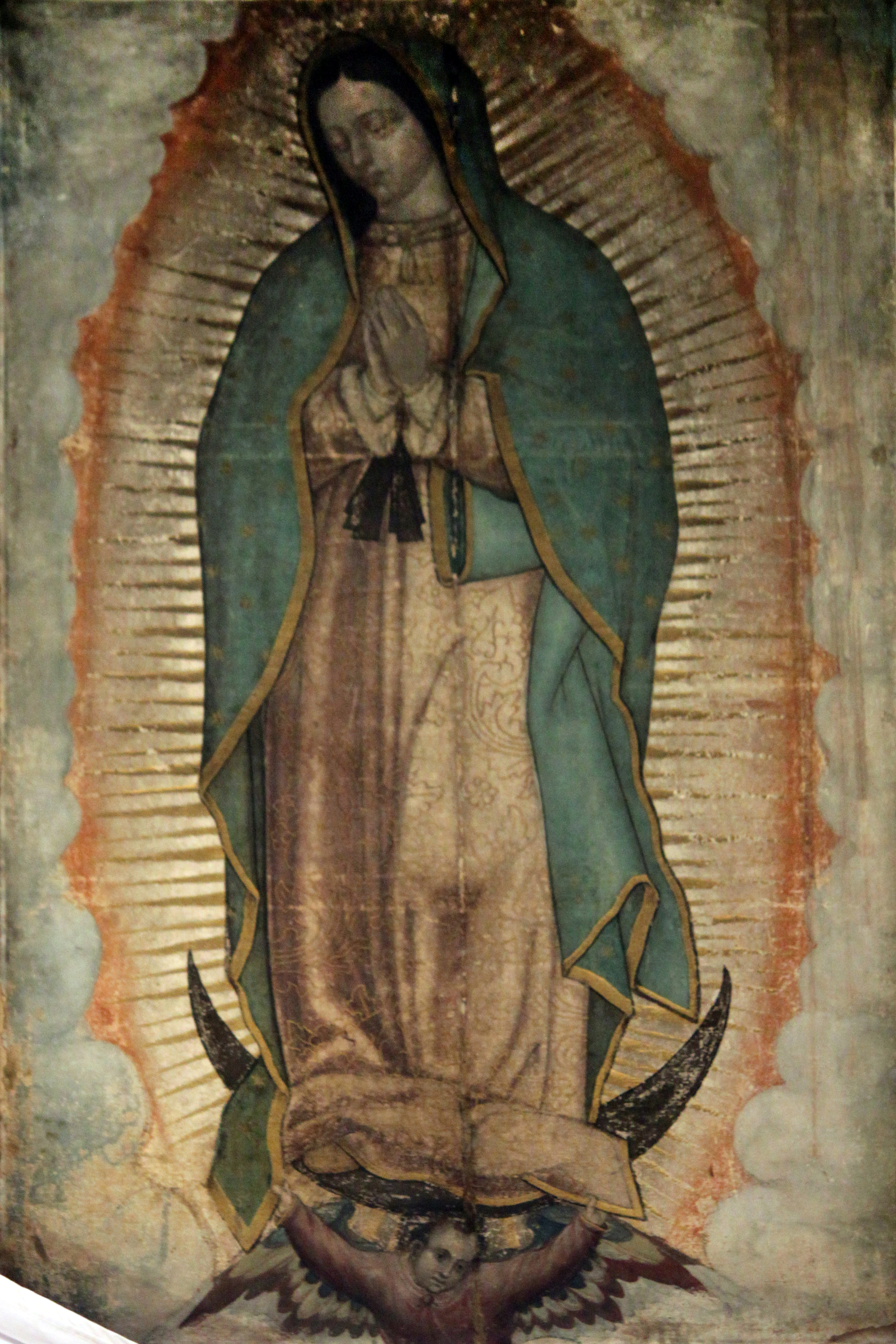
Virgin of Guadalupe

A very famous tilmàtli was that claimed to be worn by Juan Diego in 1531; according to tradition, an image of the Virgin Mary of Our Lady of Guadalupe miraculously appeared on it in the presence of the bishop of Mexico City, Juan de Zumárraga. The image is preserved in the Basilica of Our Lady of Guadalupe which attracts millions of pilgrims annually. Historians, forensic analysts, art restorationists and skeptics believe that the image is a painting created by Marcos Cipac de Aquino, and the story behind the miraculous tilma is considered "pious legend".

== Gallery ==
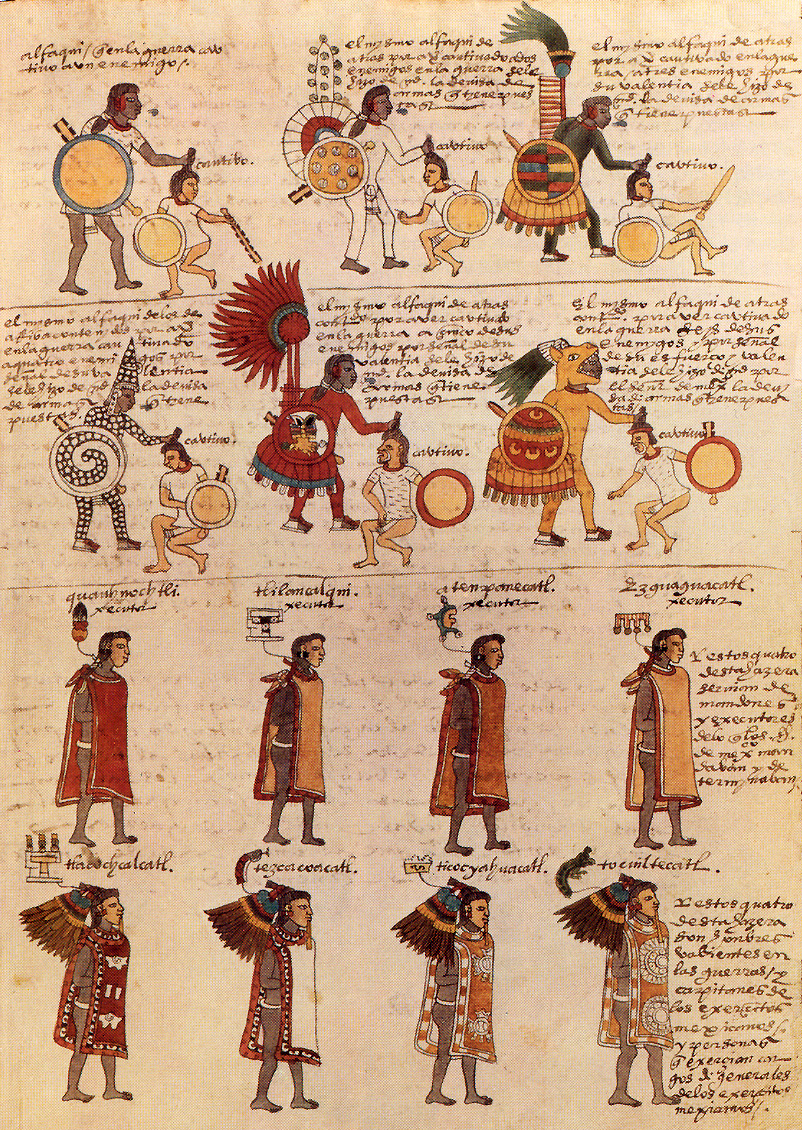
Aztec warrior priests and priests as depicted in the Codex Mendoza, wearing battle suits and tilmàtli tunics.

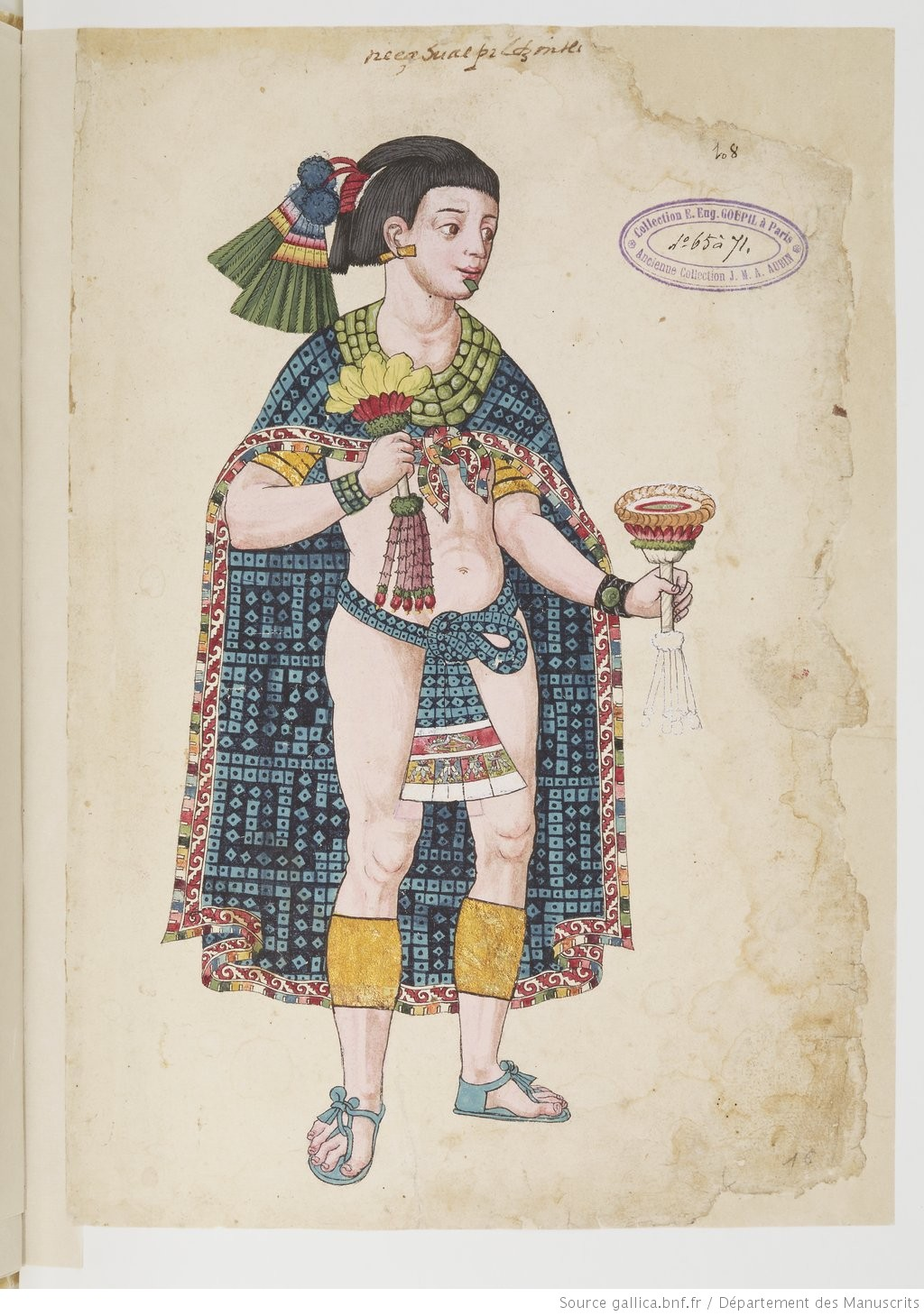
Nezahualpiltzintli wearing an elaborate tilmàtli.

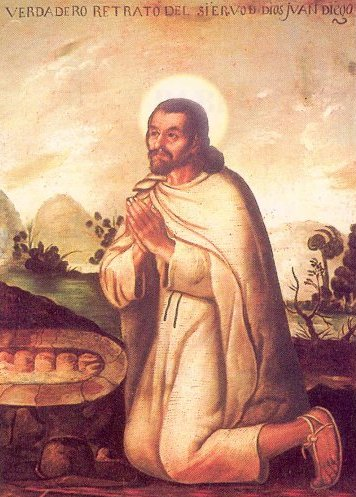
Saint Juan Diego, wearing a tilmàtl during the 1531 Our Lady of Guadalupe Marian apparitions.
