= Baltasar de Echave =

Spanish painter

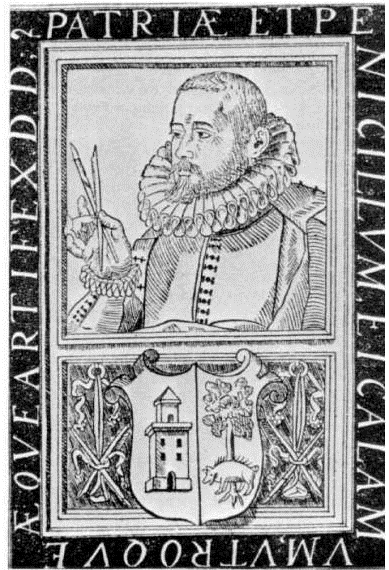
Portrait of Baltasar De Echave in his "Discursos de la antigüedad de la lengua cántabra bascongada" (Speeches on the antiquity of the Basque Cantabrian language), Mexico, Enrico Martínez, 1607.

Baltasar de Echave Orio (late 16th century – mid-17th century) was a Basque Spanish painter. As there was a painter of the same name, thought to be his son, he is known as Echave the Elder.

== Life ==
He was born at Zumaya, Guipuzcoa, Spain, and became one of the earliest Spanish artists to reach Mexico, arriving at about the same time, near the end of the 16th century, as Sebastian Arteaga and Alonzo Vasquez. As was tradition for young men of that time, his wife, also a painter, was his instructor. He died in Mexico. His son was Baltasar de Echave Ibía and his grandson was Baltasar de Echave Rioja, both painters.

== Works ==
Echave, whose subjects are chiefly religious, had especial skill in composition, and his best works are compared to Guercino.

The Academy of San Carlos, Mexico City, has some of his major works:

- "The Adoration of the Magi"
- "Christ in the Garden"
- "The Martyrdom of San Aproniano"
- "The Holy Family"
- "The Visitation"
- "The Holy Sepulchre"
- "Saint Ann and the Virgin"
- "The Apparition of Christ and the Virgin to San Francisco"
- "The Martyrdom of San Ponciano"
- "Saint Cecilia"

In the church of San José el Real, generally known as the "Profesa", several others exist, including "St. Isabel of Portugal", while he executed for the church of Santiago Tlaltelolco fifteen altar-panels. In the cathedral is his "Candelaria" and a "San Sebastian", believed to be by his wife. Among the smaller paintings of Echave is one of San Antonio Abad with St. Paul, the first hermit.

The artist also had a reputation as an author, among his works being one on the Basque language (Discursos de la antigüedad de la lengua cántabra Bascongada, Mexico, 1607).

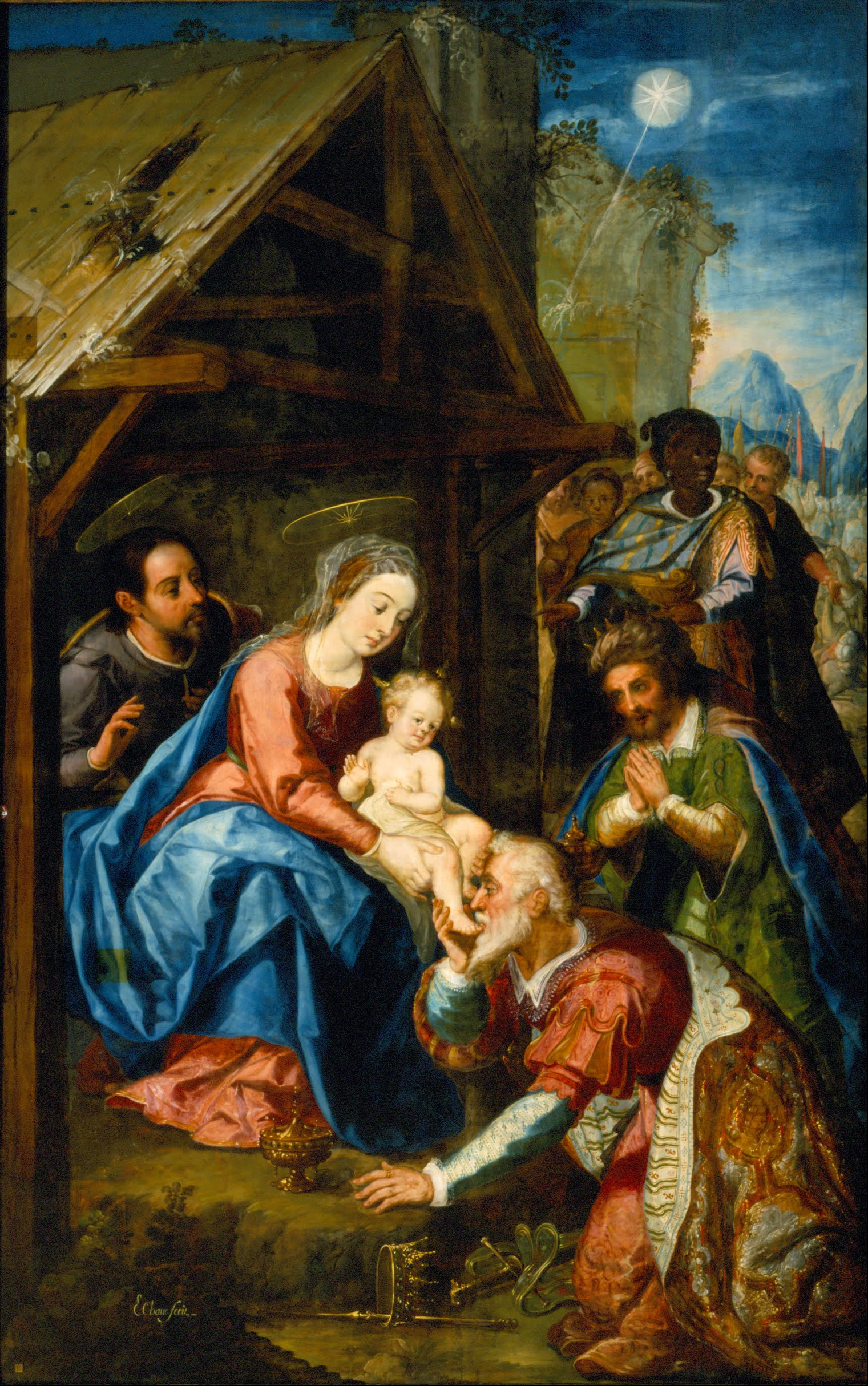
The Adoration of the Magi

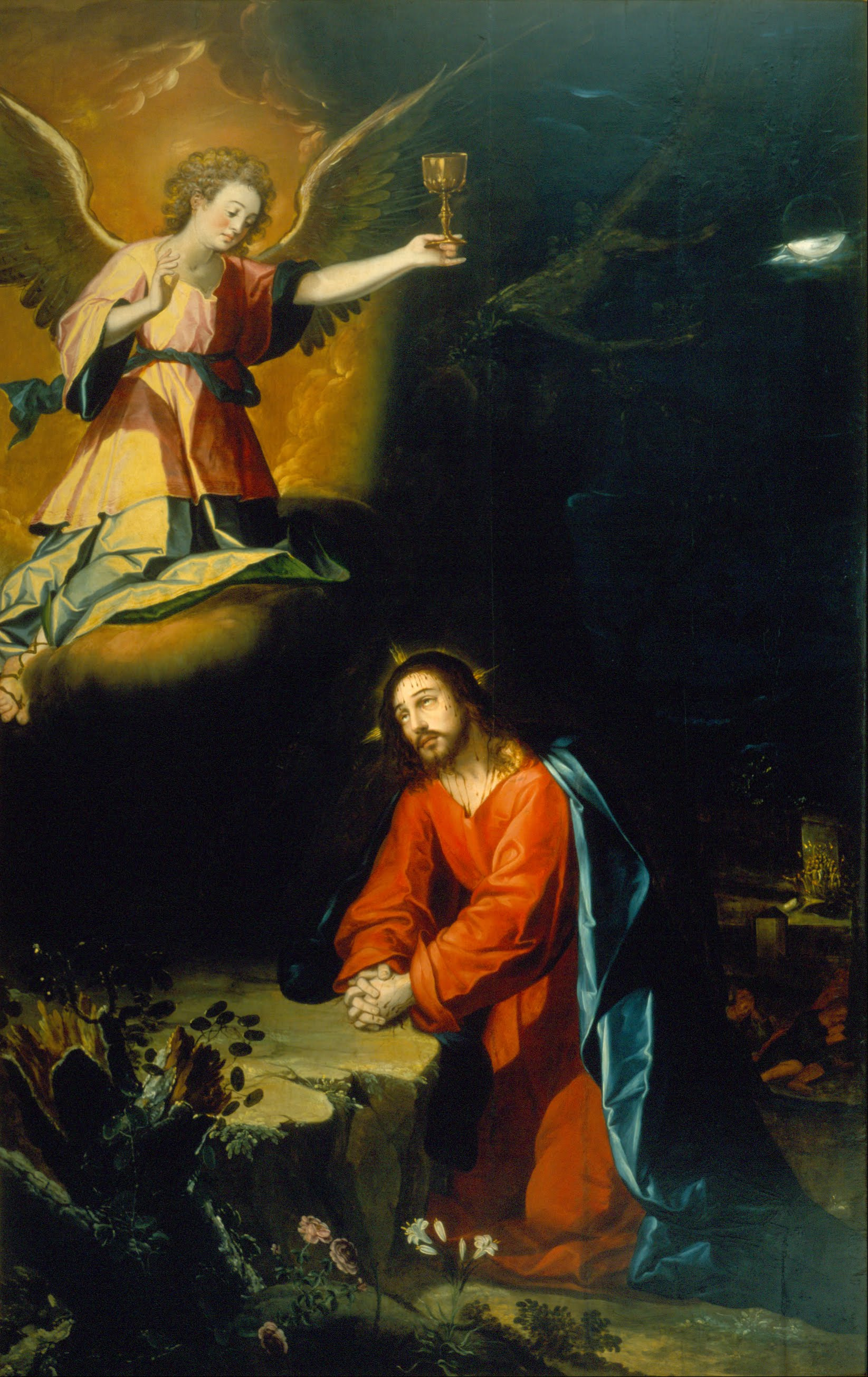
The Prayer in the Garden

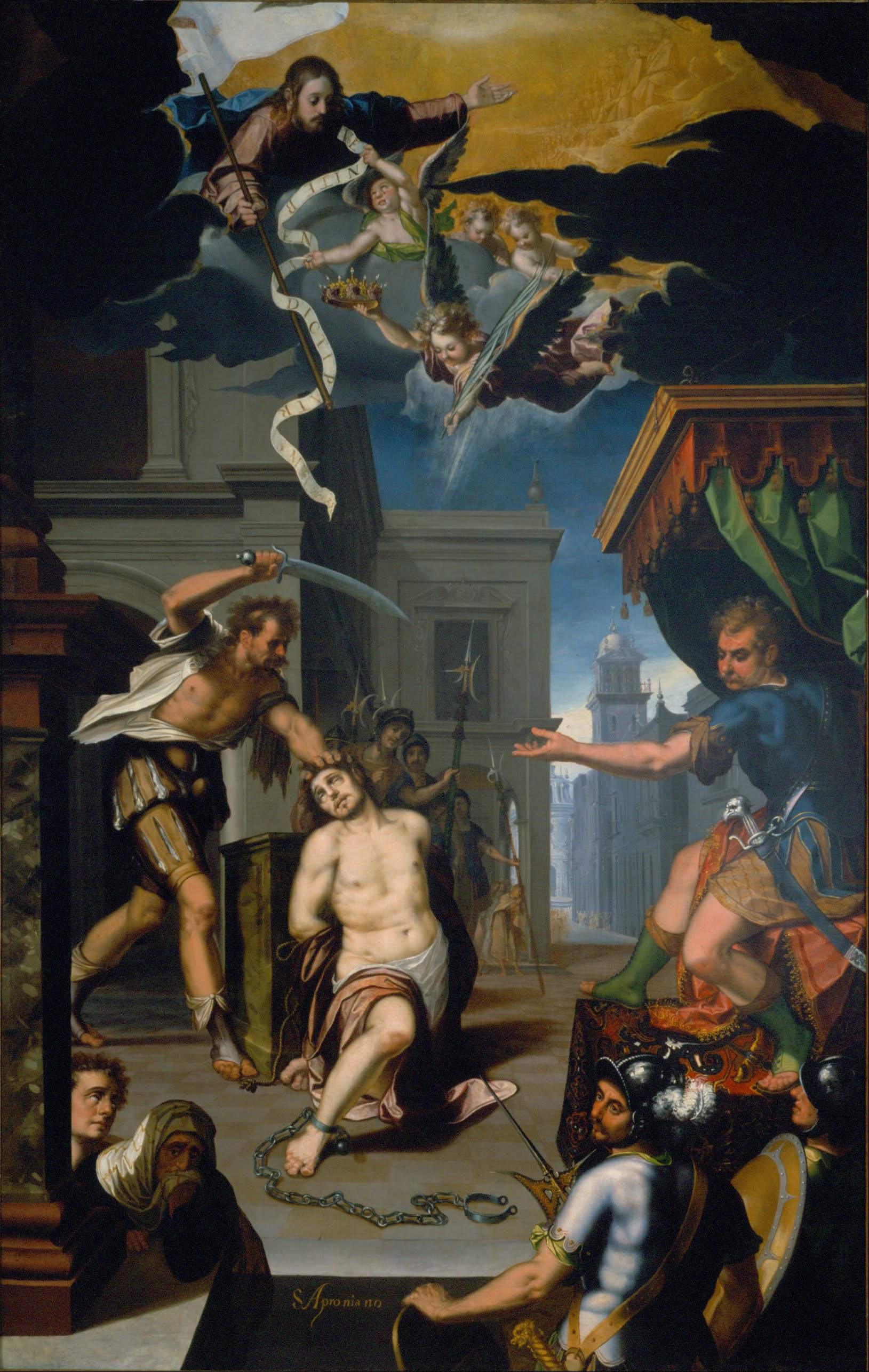
The Martyrdom of Saint Apronianus

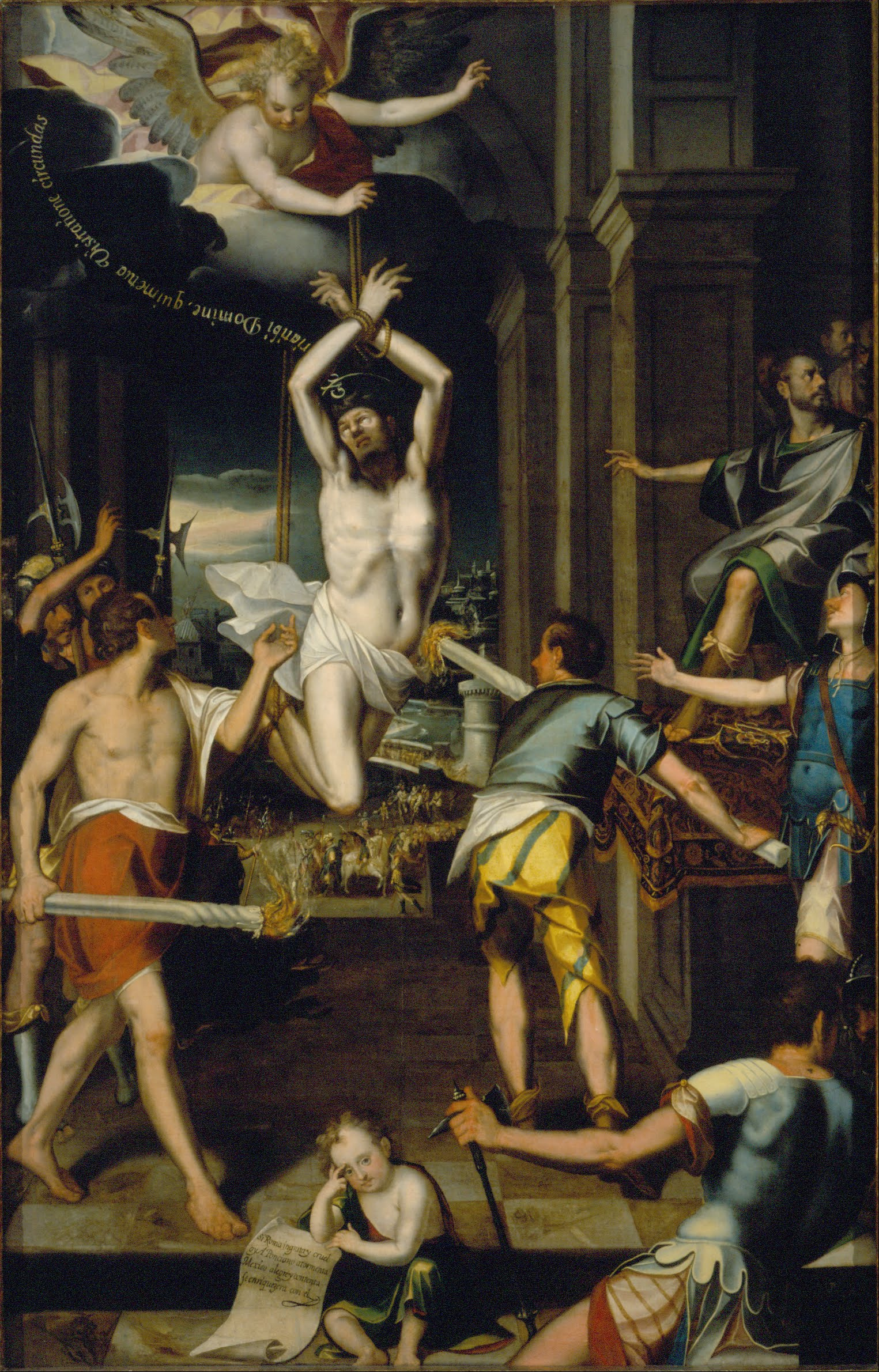
The Martyrdom of Saint Pontianus

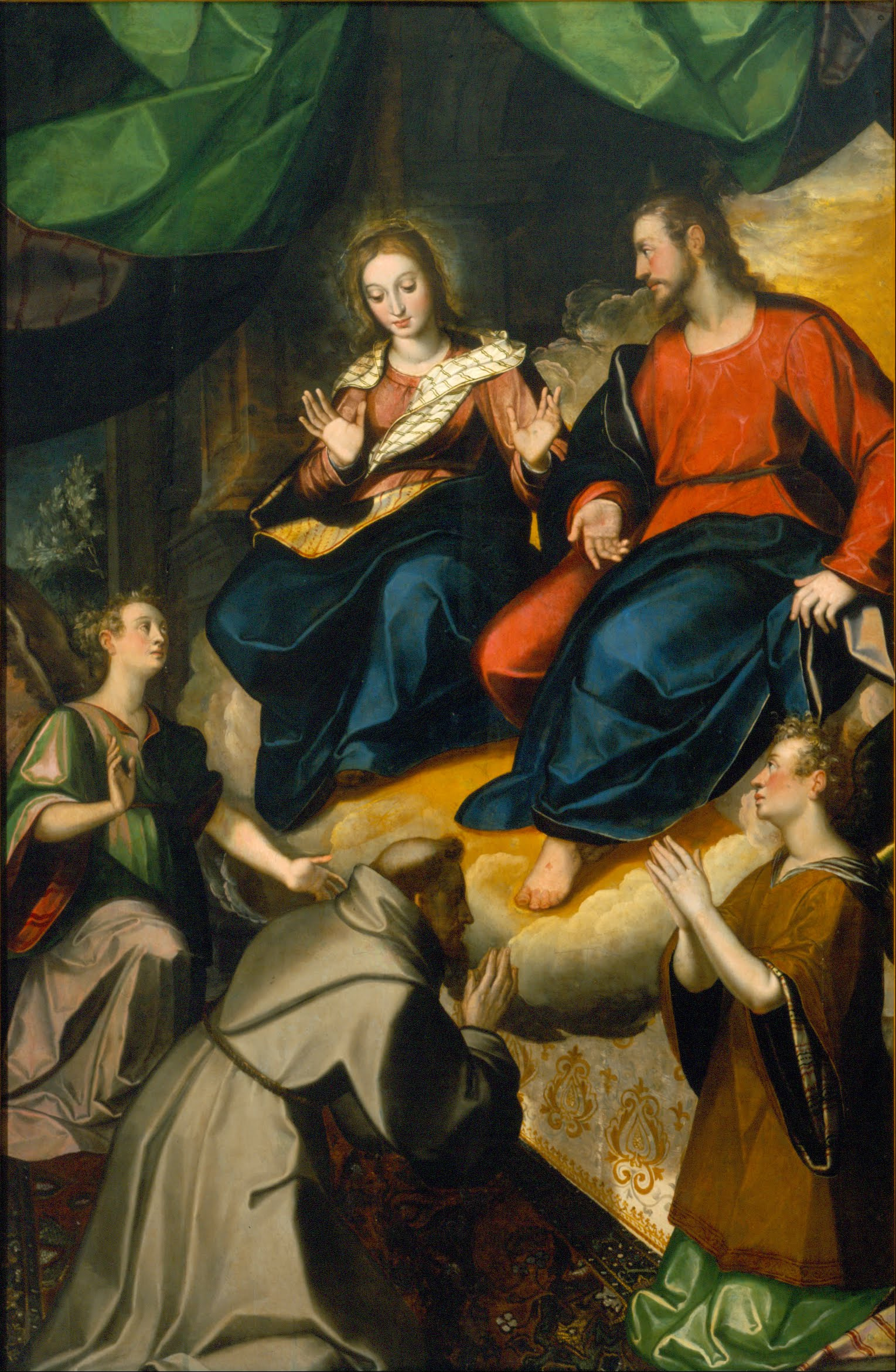
The Porciúncula

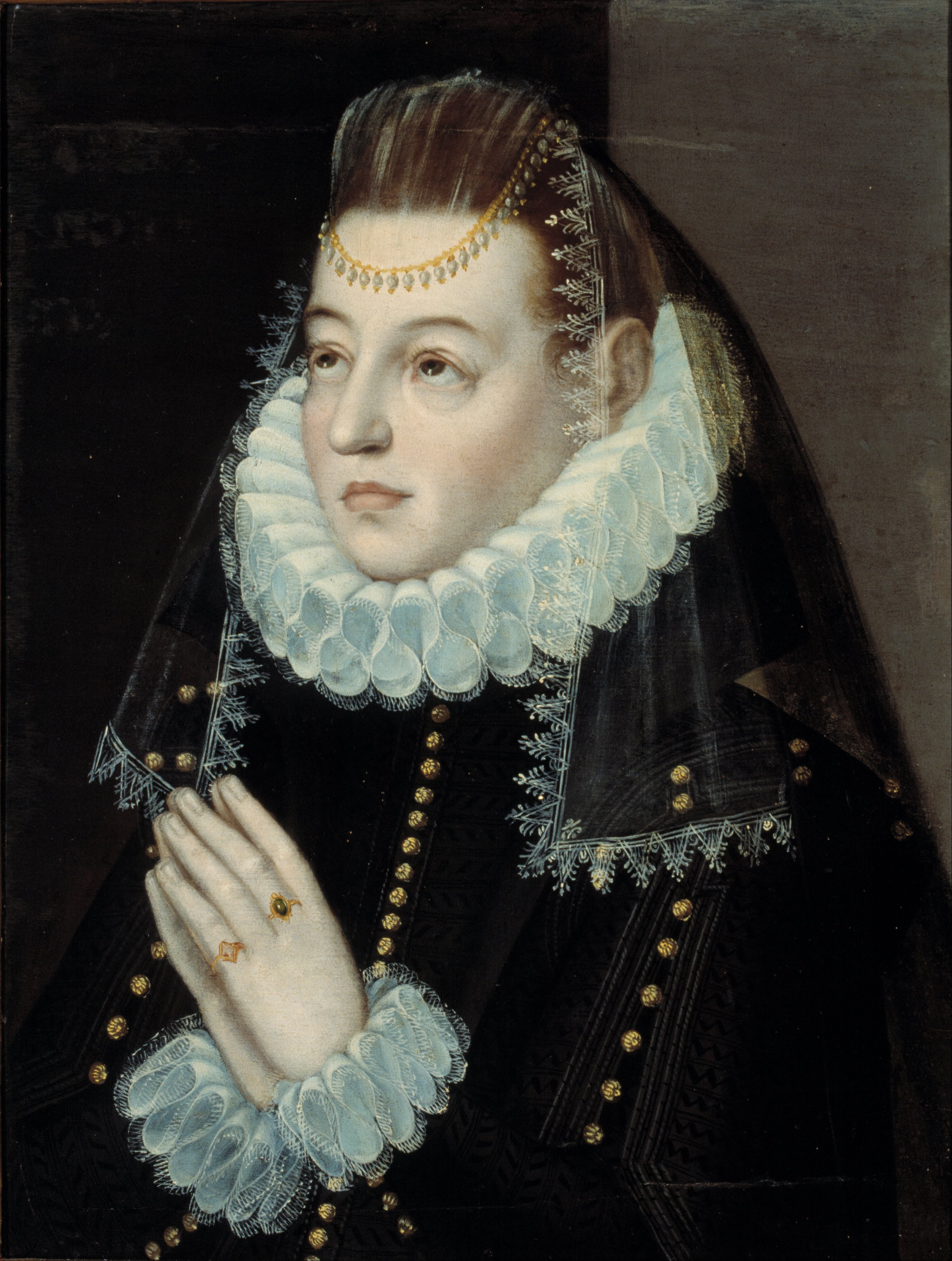
Portrait of a Lady
