= Guillermo Schulenburg =

Mexican abbot (1916–2009)

Guillermo von der Schulenburg Prado, often referred to simply as Guillermo Schulenburg (June 12, 1916 – July 19, 2009), was the abbot of the Basilica of Guadalupe in Mexico City from 1963 to 1996.

He was appointed Abbot of the Basilica of Guadalupe, the second-most visited Catholic shrine in the world, by the Pope in 1963, after having been the rector of the principal diocesan seminar in Mexico, after having coordinated the construction of its new campus. As abbot, he planned and successfully coordinated the efforts to build the new modern temple housing the venerated image of Our Lady of Guadalupe, inaugurated in 1976. He founded the famous children's choir of the Basílica, the "Coloraditos", from whose ranks opera tenors of global caliber have risen. Most of his legacy however has been obscured due to a controversy in 1996: at the age of 80, he was forced to resign following an interview published in the Catholic magazine Ixthus, in which he was quoted as saying that Juan Diego was "a symbol, not a reality," and that his canonization would be the "recognition of a cult. It is not recognition of the physical, real existence of a person."
