= Guadalupe, Spain =

Guadalupe, Spain may mean:

- Guadalupe (Spain), a river
- Guadalupe, Cáceres, a municipality in Extremadura
- Santa María de Guadalupe, a monastery in Guadalupe, Extremadura, Spain
- Guadalupe, Murcia, a village in the municipality and region of Murcia
