= Our Lady of Guadalupe in Extremadura =

Marian shrine in Caceres, Spain

Our Lady of Guadalupe in Extremadura, Spain
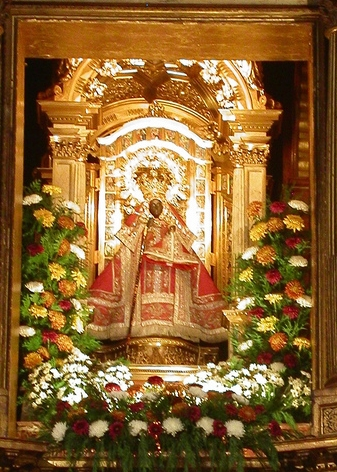
- The image, with its vestments, enshrined in the monastery.
- Location: Guadalupe, Spain
- Date: c. 14th century
- Witness: Gil Cordero
- Type: Marian apparition
- Approval: 12 October 1928, during the Canonical coronation granted by Pope Pius XI
- Venerated in: Catholic Church
- Shrine: Royal Monastery of Santa María de Guadalupe
- Attributes: Dark skin

Our Lady of Guadalupe in Extremadura is a Marian shrine in Guadalupe, Cáceres, Spain, that traces its history to the medieval kingdom of Castile. The image is enshrined in the Monastery of Santa María de Guadalupe, in the Extremadura autonomous community of Spain, and is considered the most important Marian shrine in the country.

It is one of the fifteen Black Madonnas in Spain. The statue was canonically crowned on 12 October 1928 by Pope Pius XI with a crown designed and crafted by Father Felix Granda, and crowned in the presence of King Alfonso XIII of Spain.

== Shrine ==
The shrine houses a statue reputed to have been carved by Luke the Evangelist and given to Saint Leander, Archbishop of Seville, by Pope Gregory I. According to local legend, when Seville was taken by the Moors in 712, a group of priests fled northward and buried the statue in the hills near the Guadalupe River in Extremadura.

At the beginning of the 14th century, the Virgin Mary appeared to a humble cowboy named Gil Cordero who was searching for a missing animal in the mountains. Cordero claimed that the Virgin had ordered him to ask priests to dig at the place of her apparition. The priests rediscovered the hidden statue, and built a small shrine around it which became the nucleus of the present monastery.

== Description ==
The polychromed cedar sculpture is just over two feet in height. It is a Black Madonna, in the style known as Sedes Sapientiae or the "Seat of Wisdom", with the Christ Child on Mary's lap.

Since at least the late 14th century, the wooden figure has been almost completely clothed in embroidered and brocaded vestments, leaving only the faces and hands of mother and child visible. Costly robes, deemed suitable for the Queen of Heaven, were often elaborately stitched in gold thread and set with precious gems, attesting to both the honor due the Virgin and the wealth of the donors. The underlying sculpture is rarely seen.

== Pilgrimage ==
Pilgrims began arriving in 1326, and in 1340, King Alfonso XI took a personal interest in the shrine's development, and had a Hieronymite monastery built there, attributing his victory over the Moors at the Battle of Río Salado to the Virgin's intercession. By 1386, copies of the statue were venerated in satellite chapels. Our Lady of Guadalupe, along with Santiago de Compostela and Nuestra Señora del Pilar, became rallying points for the Christian Spaniards in their reconquista of the Iberian Peninsula.

It was at the monastery that the monarchs Isabella I of Castile and Ferdinand II of Aragon signed documents that authorized the first voyage of Christopher Columbus to the Americas in 1492. Due to the royal prerogatives granted by the two Catholic Monarchs and their successors, the monastery of Guadalupe became one of the wealthiest ecclesiastical establishments in the country. Upon his return, Columbus went to the monastery to give thanks to God for a safe voyage.

The Monastery of Our Lady of Guadalupe was declared a UNESCO World Heritage Site in 1993.

== The Philippines ==
=== Virgen de Guadalupe of Loboc ===
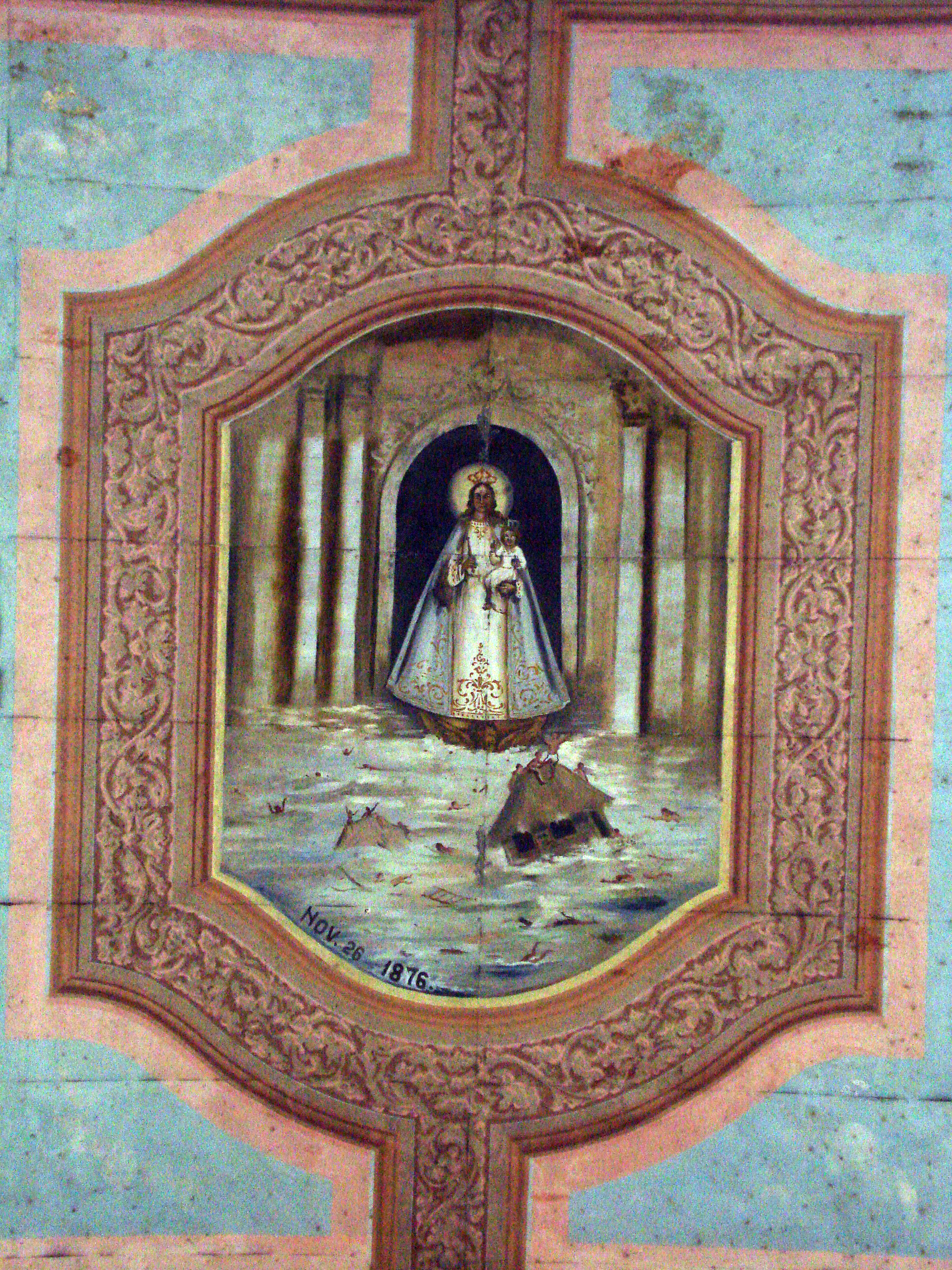
Fresco of 1876 miracle in San Pedro Church, Loboc, by renowned Cebuano painter, Ray Francia

A copy of the Extremaduran image is enshrined in Loboc Church in the island province of Bohol, and has documented miracles attributed to the Virgin. The most important of these is depicted in a fresco on the ceiling of the nave by Cebuano painter Ray Francia. The account of the miracle says that when Loboc was engulfed in a devastating flood on 26 November 1876, the waters submerged the altar of the church. Miraculously, these stopped at the base of the image of the Virgin, which remained intact as the waters receded. In addition, the townsfolk escaped unharmed and with no casualties despite the widespread damage.

Many devotees from throughout the Philippines join the residents of Loboc for the image’s feast in May, particularly childless women. They dance the Bolibongkingking before the image to ask for the Virgin’s intercession. Those who successfully bear children return to the shrine in thanksgiving, often dedicating the miraculously conceived child to God. Rich devotees would sometimes offer new vestments and metal regalia to the Virgen as ex votos.

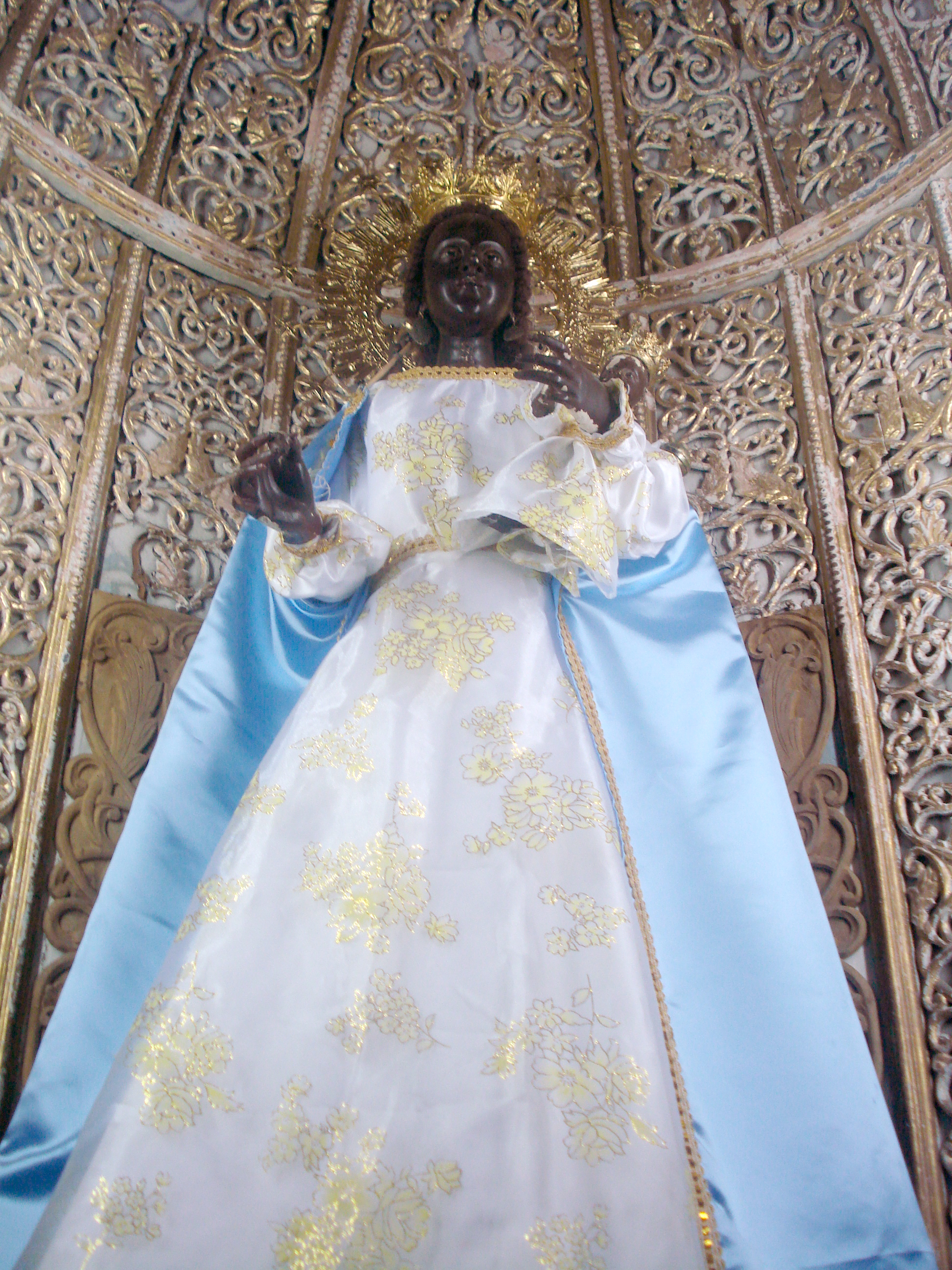
The marian image venerated in the main altar.

==== The Bolibongkingking Festival ====
The people of Loboc honor the Virgen de Guadalupe every 24 May. Named for the sounds of the indigenous drums (bolibong) and gongs (kingking) used in the ritual dance, Lobocanons begin celebrations nine days prior to the feast day with chanting of the Gozos to the Virgin preceding Mass on each day. A Gozo is a type of hymn in the Philippines, written in the vernacular or Latin, and is in the form of a ballad containing praises to God or a specific patron saint.

On the bísperás or vigil of the feast day, a fluvial procession is held on the Loboc River. The image is removed from its shrine and brought to a barge that is otherwise a floating restaurant, while Marian songs, marches, and hymns are played. Dignitaries from both church and state participate in the procession, which reenacts the miracle of the 1840s when a cholera epidemic ended after the townsfolk brought the image to the river.

The actual Bolibongkingking Festival is held on the feast day proper. Considered a ritual of both healing and thanksgiving, the dance has devotees, facing the image, swaying to the rhythm of the drums and gongs lifting their hands and prayers to God through the intercession of the Virgen de Guadalupe following Mass. Today the Bolibongkingking dance has spun off with an additional street dance event by students.

== See also ==
- List of churches under the patronage of Our Lady of Guadalupe
