= Unfinished building =

Building where construction is delayed or postponed

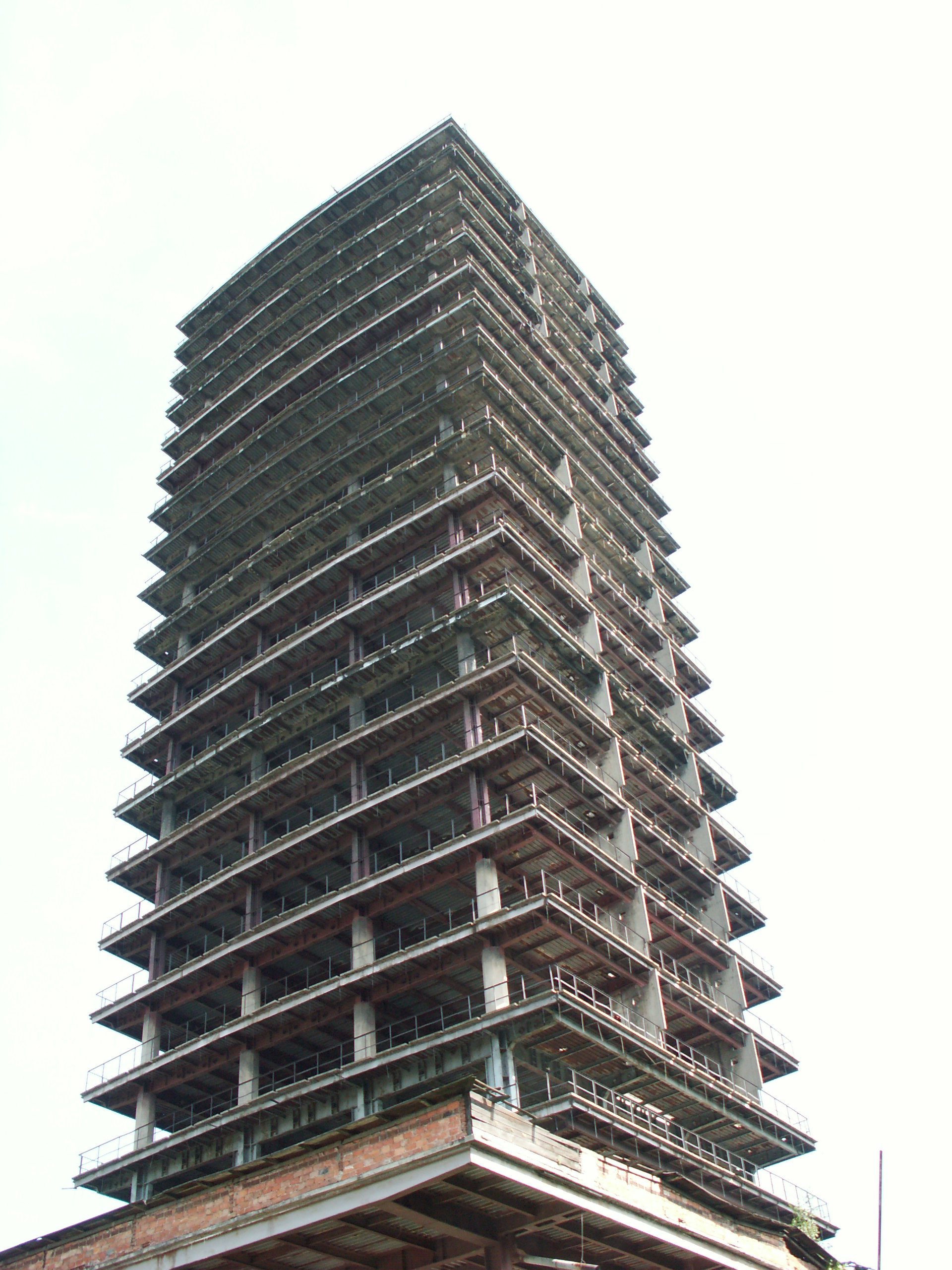
Unity Tower, a high-rise building in Kraków, Poland, sat in an unfinished state from 1981 until 2016 when construction restarted.

An unfinished building is a building (or other architectural structure, as a bridge, a road or a tower) where construction work was abandoned or on hold at some stage or only exists as a design. It may also refer to buildings that are currently being built, particularly those that have been delayed or at which construction work progresses extremely slowly.

Many construction or engineering projects have remained unfinished at various stages of development. The work may be finished as a blueprint or whiteprint and never be realised, or be abandoned during construction.

One of the best-known perennially incomplete buildings is Antoni Gaudí's basilica Sagrada Família in Barcelona. It has been under construction since 1882 and planned to be complete by 2026, Gaudí's death centenary.

== Partially constructed buildings ==
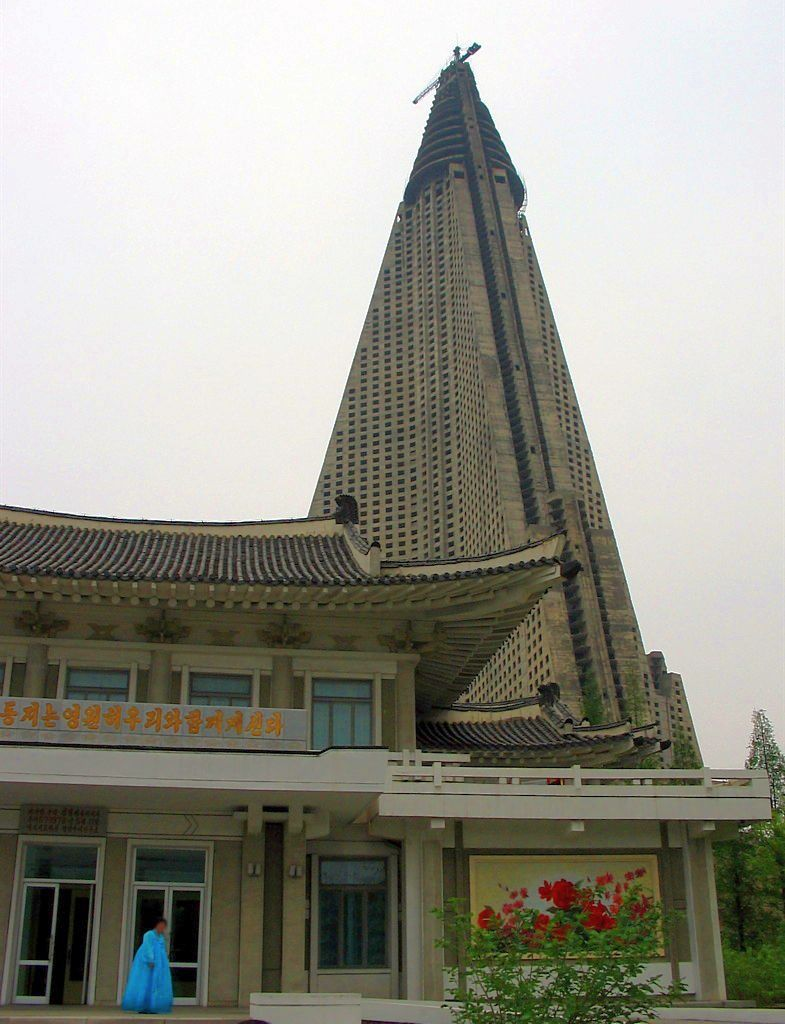
Construction of the Ryugyong Hotel in Pyongyang was on hold between 1992 and 2008. Had it been completed on schedule, it would have been the tallest hotel in the world at the time.

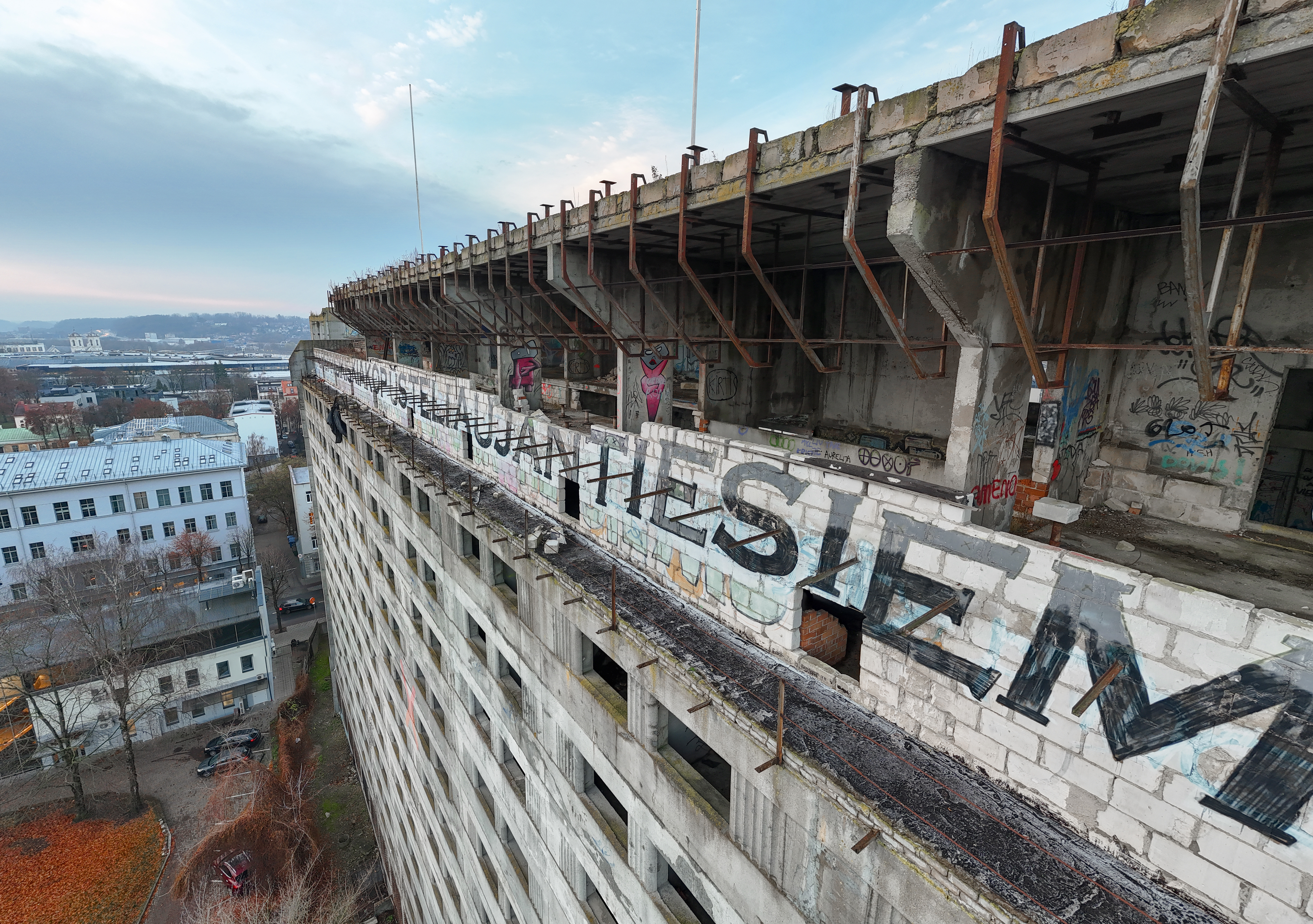
Construction on Hotel Britanika in Lithuania was halted after the country gained independence in 1990

There are numerous unfinished buildings that remain partially constructed in countries around the world, some of which can be used in their incomplete state but with others remaining as a mere shell. Some projects are intentionally left with an unfinished appearance, particularly the follies of the late 16th to 18th century.

Some buildings are in a cycle of near-perpetual construction, with work lasting for decades or even centuries. Antoni Gaudí's Sagrada Família in Barcelona, Spain, has been under construction for around 140 years, having started in the 1880s. Work was delayed by the Spanish Civil War, during which the original models and parts of the building itself were destroyed. Today, even with portions of the basilica incomplete, it is still the most popular tourist destination in Barcelona with 1.5 million visitors every year. Gaudí spent 40 years of his life overseeing the project and is buried in the crypt. Germany's Cologne Cathedral took even longer to complete; construction started in 1248 and finished in 1880, a total of 632 years.

=== Buildings (and other architectural structures) never completed ===
Buildings that were never completed and remain in that state include:

- Duomo di Siena (Siena Cathedral), Italy
- Abbey of the Santissima Trinità, Venosa, Italy
- San Petronio Basilica, Bologna, Italy
- Herrenchiemsee, Bavaria, Germany
- Prora, island of Rügen, Germany
- Hotel Britanika, Kaunas, Lithuania
- Woodchester Mansion, Stroud, Gloucester, England, UK
- Bishop Castle, San Isabel National Forest, Colorado, US
- Boldt Castle, Thousand Islands, New York, US
- National Monument, Edinburgh, Scotland, UK
- Ajuda National Palace, Lisbon, Portugal
- Cuenca Cathedral, Cuenca, Spain
- Al-Rahman Mosque, Baghdad, Iraq
- Kellie's Castle, Batu Gajah, Malaysia
- Plaza Rakyat, Kuala Lumpur, Malaysia
- Cathedral of St. Alban the Martyr, Toronto, Ontario, Canada
- Centro Financiero Confinanzas, Caracas, Venezuela
- Beaumaris Castle, Anglesey, Wales, UK
- Ryugyong Hotel, Pyongyang, North Korea
- Sathorn Unique Tower, Bangkok, Thailand
- 161 Maiden Lane, New York City, US

Unfinished buildings that were subsequently demolished:

- Aspotogan Sea Spa, Nova Scotia, Canada
- The Harmon, Las Vegas, US

In other cases, construction works proceeds extremely slowly, so one can also say form incomplete structures. Examples are:

- Cathedral of St. John the Divine, New York City, New York, US
- Sagrada Família, Barcelona, Spain
- Kaliakra transmitter, Cape Kaliakra, Bulgaria
- Westminster Cathedral, London, UK
- Mosul Grand Mosque, Mosul, Iraq
- Monumento a la Revolución, Mexico City, Mexico

=== Other unfinished structures ===
There are also roads, railway lines and channels which remained unfinished.

==== Roads ====
- MP-203, Madrid, Spain
- Interstate 710, Los Angeles County, California
- Route 11 Expressway, New London County, Connecticut
- LaSalle Expressway, Niagara County, New York
- South Mall Arterial/Dunn Memorial Bridge, Albany and Rensselaer, New York
- Seaford–Oyster Bay Expressway, Nassau County, New York
- Korean War Veterans Parkway (Richmond Parkway), Staten Island, New York
- Willowbrook Expressway/Parkway, Staten Island, New York
- Foothills Parkway, Tennessee
- Amstutz Expressway, Waukegan, Illinois
- Olimpijka in Poland
- M8 Bridge to Nowhere, Glasgow, Scotland
- The Foreshore Freeway Bridge in Cape Town, South Africa
- B 464 near Sindelfingen, Germany
- Strecke 19 (Berlin - Hamburg)
- Strecke 20 (Berlin - Wittstock)
- Strecke 24 (Basel - Hamburg)
- Strecke 37 (Koblenz - Mehren)
- Strecke 46 (Fulda - Würzburg)
- Strecke 73 (Dresden - Görlitz)
- Strecke 77 (Hamm - Kassel)
- Strecke 78 (Eisenach - Kassel)
- Strecke 85 (Bamberg - Eisenach)
- Strecke 86 (Nürnberg - Regensburg)
- Interstate 170, Baltimore, MD
- New Central Cross-Island Highway, Taiwan (including Provincial Highway 14, 18, 21)

==== Railway infrastructure ====
- Cincinnati Subway
- Mosel Railway (German: Moselbahn)
- Ahrtal Railway (German: Ahrtalbahn)
- Old Railway at Willebadessen
- Strategic Railway Embankment (German: Strategischer Bahndamm)

==== Arenas ====
- Deutsches Stadion
- Nou Mestalla
- Lithuania National Stadium

==== Ferris wheels ====
- New York Wheel, New York City, New York, US
- Skyvue, Las Vegas, Nevada, US
- Turn of Fortune, Changzhou, China

==== Industrial plants ====
- Kramatorsk Metallurgical Plant
- GRES-2 Power Station, Ekibastus

==== Nuclear power plants ====
- Crimean Atomic Energy Station, Shcholkine, Crimea
- Fast Breeder nuclear reactor SNR-300, Kalkar, Germany
- Lemoniz Nuclear Power Plant, Lemoniz, Spain
- Marble Hill Nuclear Power Plant, New Washington, IN, United States
- Satsop Nuclear Power Plant, Satsop, Washington, United States
- Stendal Nuclear Power Plant, Arneburg, Germany
- Unit 5, 6, 7, 8 of Chernobyl Nuclear Power Station
- Valdecaballeros Nuclear Power Plant, Valdecaballeros, Spain
- Lungmen Nuclear Power Plant, Taiwan
- Juragua Nuclear Power Plant, Cuba
- Żarnowiec Nuclear Power Plant, Poland

==== Electric power transmission systems ====
- Wolmirstedt HVDC-back-to-back plant
- Elbe Project
- HVDC Ekibastuz–Centre

==== Towers ====
- Watkins' Tower, London, UK
- Yekaterinburg TV Tower, Yekaterinburg, Russia (demolished)
- Berlin-Müggelberge TV Tower, Berlin, Germany
- Dubai Creek Tower, Dubai, United Arab Emirates
- Belgorod TV Tower, Belgorod, Russia
- Deutschlandsender Herzberg/Elster, Germany
- Wardenclyffe Tower, Shoreham, New York, USA
- Hakell Creative Educational Media, Haskell, Oklahoma, USA at 35°53'0"N 95°46'15"W
- Galich TV Mast

== See also ==
- Unfinished creative work
- List of visionary tall buildings and structures
- Off-plan property
