= La Villuerca =

Highest peak of the Sierra de Villuercas mountain range in Spain

- Risco de la Villuerca
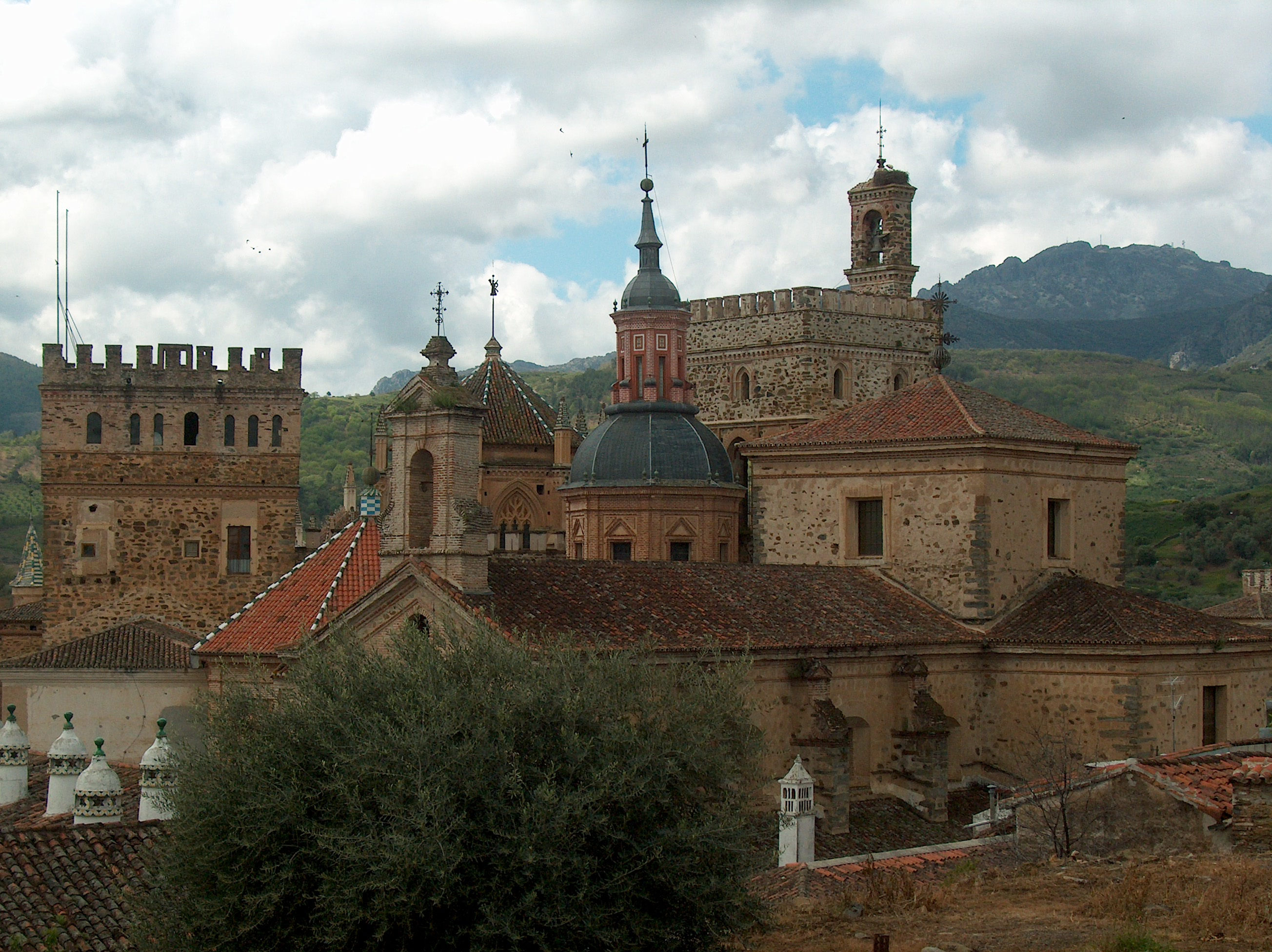
- La Villuerca on the right above Santa María de Guadalupe monastery

Highest point
- Elevation: 1,603 m (5,259 ft)
- Coordinates: 39°28′6″N 5°24′5″W

Geography
- Location within Spain
- Location: Las Villuercas comarca (Extremadura)
- Parent range: Sierra de las Villuercas, Montes de Toledo

Geology
- Mountain type: Granite

Climbing
- First ascent: Unknown
- Easiest route: Drive from Navezuelas or Guadalupe

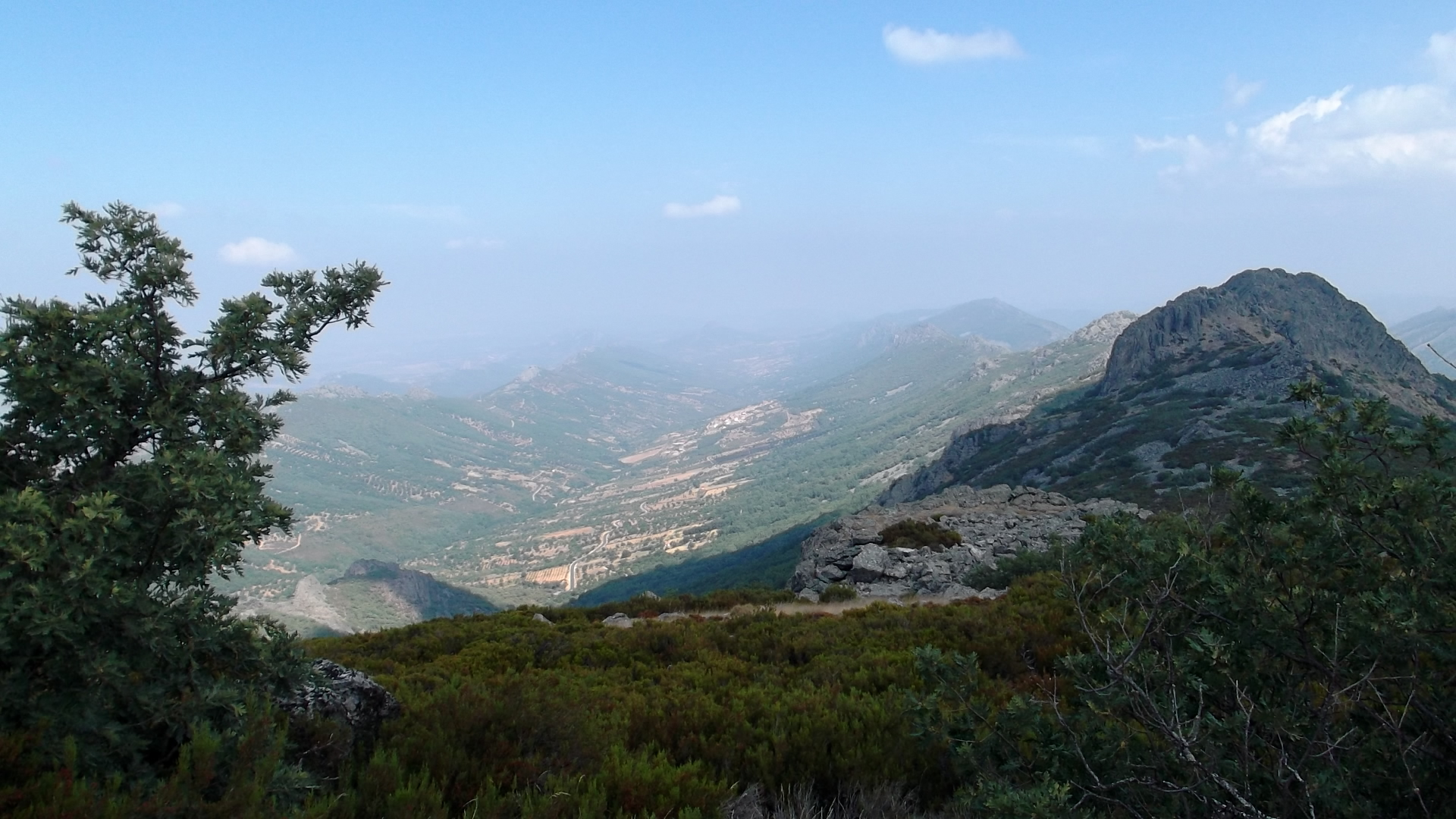
Navezuelas seen from La Villuerca

La Villuerca, also known as Risco de la Villuerca, Pico la Villuerca and Pico de las Villuercas, is the highest peak of the Sierra de Villuercas mountain range in Spain, also known as Sierra de Guadalupe.

It is located 6 km west of Guadalupe town in Las Villuercas comarca, Cáceres Province, Extremadura, Spain and is the highest point of the greater Montes de Toledo system.

== Description ==
La Villuerca has an elevation of 1,603 metres above sea level and is a conspicuous mountain that can be seen from quite a distance in the surrounding landscape. This peak has an ancient name that has been documented since 1353 and it gives its name to Las Villuercas comarca.

There is a narrow paved road leading to the mountaintop, where there are abandoned military installations of the former Base Centro Táctico, CT2, Guadalupe-Villuercas with tall antennas and a heliport. The peak is often covered with snow in the winter.
