= Sierra de Villuercas =

Mountain range in Spain

- Sierra de Guadalupe
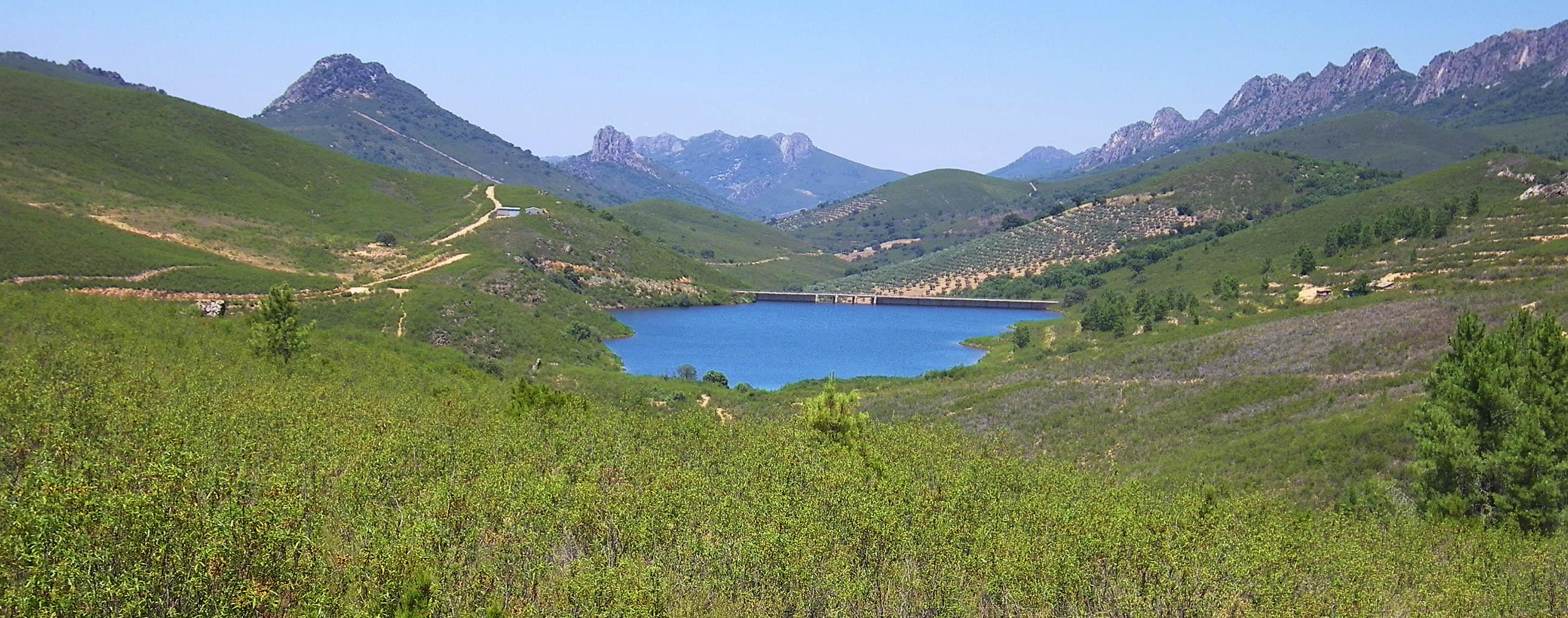
- The Sierra de Villuercas and Santa Lucia Dam

Highest point
- Peak: La Villuerca
- Elevation: 1,603 m (5,259 ft)
- Coordinates: 39°29′00″N 5°24′00″W

Dimensions
- Length: 62 km (39 mi) NW/SE
- Width: 15 km (9.3 mi) NE/SW

Geography
- Location within Spain
- Location: Extremadura
- Country: Spain
- Parent range: Montes de Toledo

Geology
- Orogeny: Alpine
- Rock age: Silurian
- Rock type: Granite

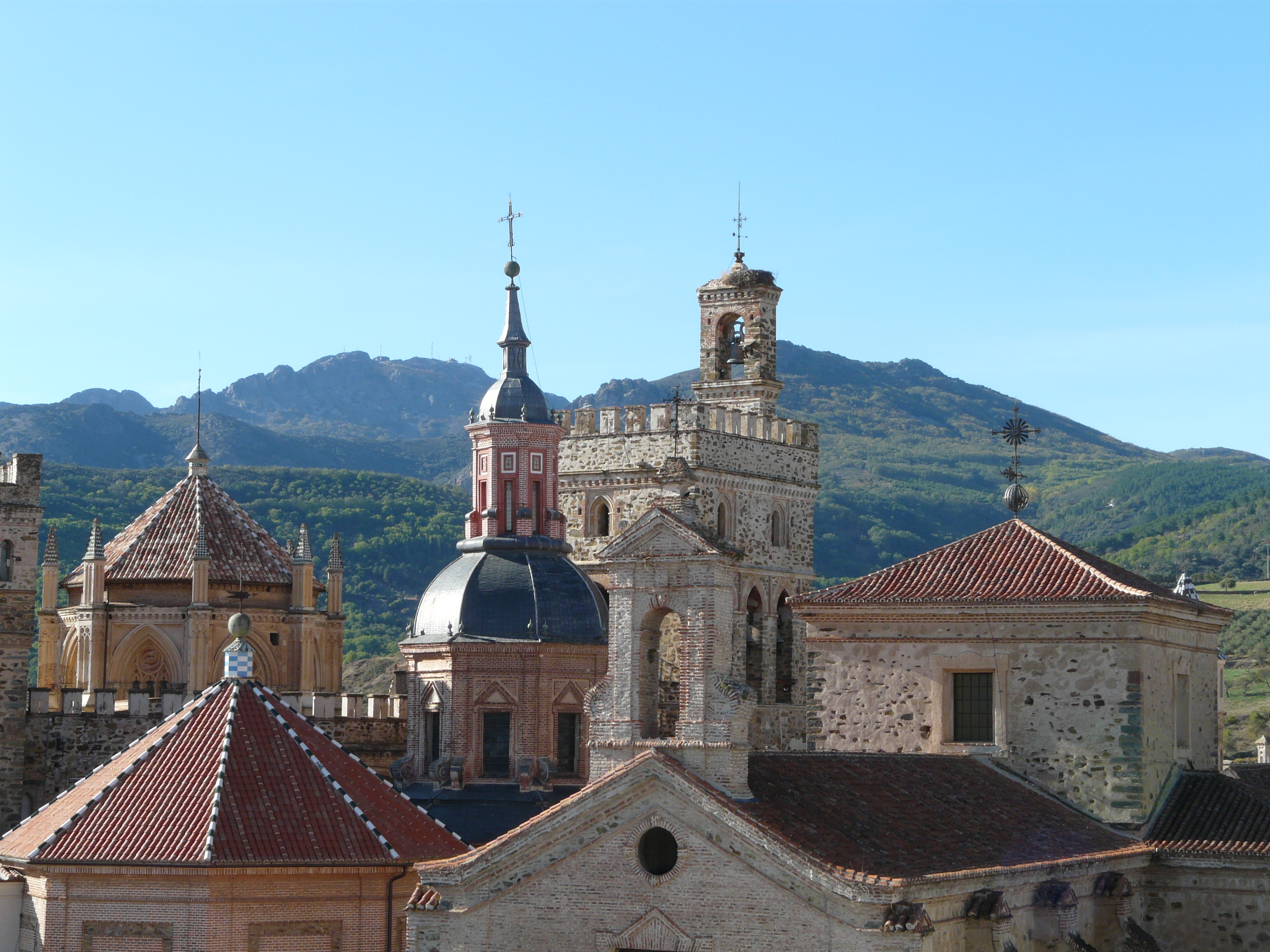
The main mountains of the range rising behind the Santa María de Guadalupe monastery

Sierra de Villuercas or Sierra de las Villuercas, also known as Sierra de Guadalupe after nearby Guadalupe town, is a mountain range in the greater Montes de Toledo range, Spain. It is located in province of Cáceres, autonomous community of Extremadura.

Rivers Almonte and Ibor, tributaries of the Tagus, and the Ruecas and Guadalupe River, tributaries of the Guadiana, have their sources in this range.

== Description ==
The Sierra de Villuercas stretches for about 60 km in a roughly NNW/SSE direction in the southeast of Cáceres Province. From its northern end a lower ridge stretches in an arch further westwards from Deleitosa. Southwards there is a straight low ridge aligned in a N/S direction connecting with the Sierra de los Golondrinos prolongation further south straddling river Guadiana. The lower Sierra de Montánchez extends further west of the Sierra de Villuercas.

This range is parallel to the Sierra de la Palomera and Sierra de Altamira further east of Guadalupe. There is an abundance of fossils of Ammonites, Trilobites, Brachiopods, Graptolites and Cloudinids in certain points of the range.

The highest point of the range is conspicuous La Villuerca (1,603 m), which gives name to Las Villuercas comarca and is the highest point of the greater Montes de Toledo range. Cervales (1441 m), Carbonero (1428 m), Ballesteros (1342 m), Sobacorbas (1320 m) o Risco Redondo (1287 m).

=== Geology ===
The Sierra de Villuercas geological structure is similar to the geology of the Appalachians. The range is mainly composed of slates and quartzites that are often exposed in its jagged peaks.

There are also interesting conglomerate geological formations made up of quartzite boulders and unstratified clays known locally as "rañas".

== History ==
This mountainous area was the scenario of the Battle of the Sierra Guadalupe, a bloody conflict at the beginning of the Spanish Civil War.
