= List of churches dedicated to Our Lady of Guadalupe =

List of churches under the patronage of Our Lady of Guadalupe

This is a list of church buildings of the Catholic Church that are under the patronage of Our Lady of Guadalupe.

- Basilica of Our Lady of Guadalupe
- Diocesan Sanctuary of Our Lady of Guadalupe
- Cathedral Santuario de Guadalupe (Dallas, Texas)
- Church of Our Lady of Guadalupe (Puerto Vallarta)
- Basilica of Guadalupe, Monterrey
- Our Lady of Guadalupe in Extremadura
- Our Lady of Guadalupe Cathedral
- Our Lady of Guadalupe Catholic Church
- Our Lady of Guadalupe Church
- Monastery of Saint Mary of Guadalupe
- National Shrine of Our Lady of Guadalupe (Makati City, Metro Manila, Philippines)
- Diocesan Shrine of Our Lady of Guadalupe (Pagsanjan, Laguna, Philippines)
