= MP-203 =

Motorway in Madrid, Spain

MP-203

Route information
- Length: 12.5 km (7.8 mi)

Major junctions
- From: Mejorada del Campo
- To: San Fernando de Henares

Highway system
- Highways in Spain; Autopistas and autovías; National Roads; Transport in the Community of Madrid

'MP-203' is an unfinished motorway in Madrid, Spain that connects from Mejorada del Campo to San Fernando de Henares. Its construction goal was to reduce the traffic congestion on the A-2 motorway by providing an alternative motorway route for drivers. The construction of the highway was started in 2005, with €70 million being spent on the construction. However, in 2007, the construction of this highway was suspended due to the issues regarding the Madrid–Barcelona high-speed rail line, the connection to the R-3 motorway, and also the period of great recession in Spain. As a result, only 70% of the route was completed.
