= Hotel Britanika =

Unfinished hotel building in Kaunas, Lithuania

- Viešbutis Britanika
- Above the unfinished Britanika hotel in 2025
- Interactive map of the Hotel Britanika area

General information
- Status: Abandoned
- Type: Hotel (planned)
- Architectural style: Late modernism
- Location: Kęstučio g. 26, Kaunas, Lithuania
- Coordinates: 54.8955°N 23.9184°E
- Construction started: 1986
- Construction stopped: 1990

Technical details
- Floor count: 14
- Grounds: 0.57 ha (1.4 acres)

Design and construction
- Architect: Alfredas Paulauskas

Britanika (Viešbutis „Britanika“) is an unfinished hotel in central Kaunas, Lithuania. Planned as a 14-storey, roughly 500-bed facility, it was one of the largest hotel developments launched during the final years of the Lithuanian SSR. Construction halted in the early 1990s, leaving the structure as an unfinished reinforced-concrete shell.

== History ==
Construction of Britanika began in 1986, at a time when large tourism and conference-oriented complexes were being promoted across Soviet republics. By the time work halted around 1990, the building’s structural frame had reached full height but lacked windows, mechanical systems and interior finishes; later assessments placed overall completion at roughly 60%.

During the first decade of Lithuanian independence, ownership shifted between the municipality and several private entities. A late-1990s joint-activity agreement failed to restart construction, and in 2011 the city sold its remaining minority stake. Throughout the 2000s and 2010s, multiple redevelopment or demolition proposals were announced but none advanced beyond preliminary discussions.

Because of its height and exposed concrete frame, the building became a long-standing example of post-Soviet urban stagnation. Local media often refer to it as a “gelžbetoninis monstras” (“reinforced-concrete monster”), framing it within wider debates on Soviet-era gigantism, post-independence investment failures and the aesthetics of derelict structures in Baltic cities.

Despite its deteriorated condition, Britanika has periodically attracted public interest. In September 2019 the roof was legally opened for the Kaunas Architecture Festival (KAFe), allowing visitors to access the upper floors and view the city. The event brought renewed attention to the building and prompted further discussion regarding its future use.

== Present condition ==
As of 2025, the building remains structurally intact but unused, with exposed concrete surfaces and no significant modernization since work ended in 1990. It is one of the most visible abandoned high-rise structures in central Kaunas. Its long-term fate including possible demolition or redevelopment remains unresolved.

== Gallery ==
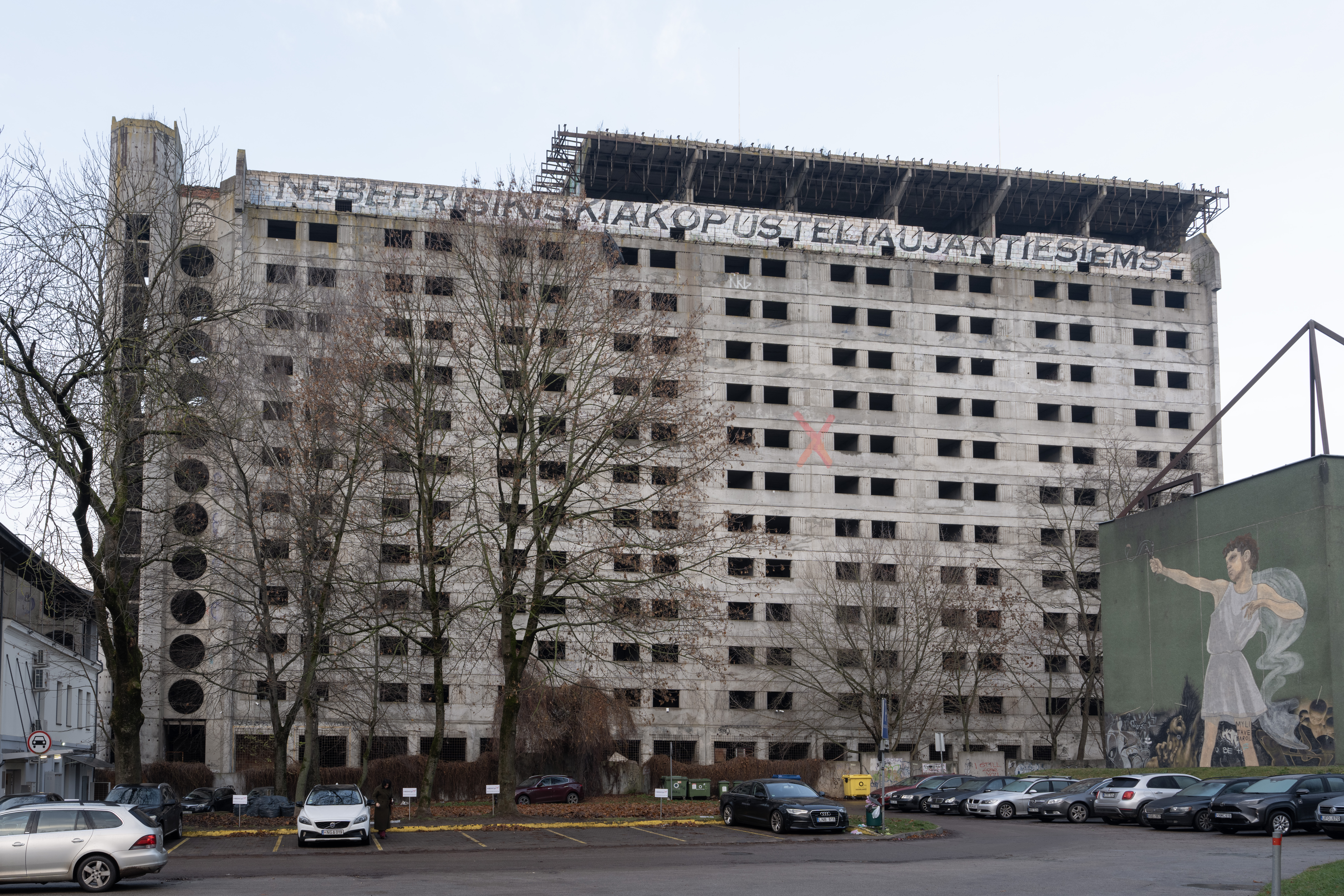
Ground view

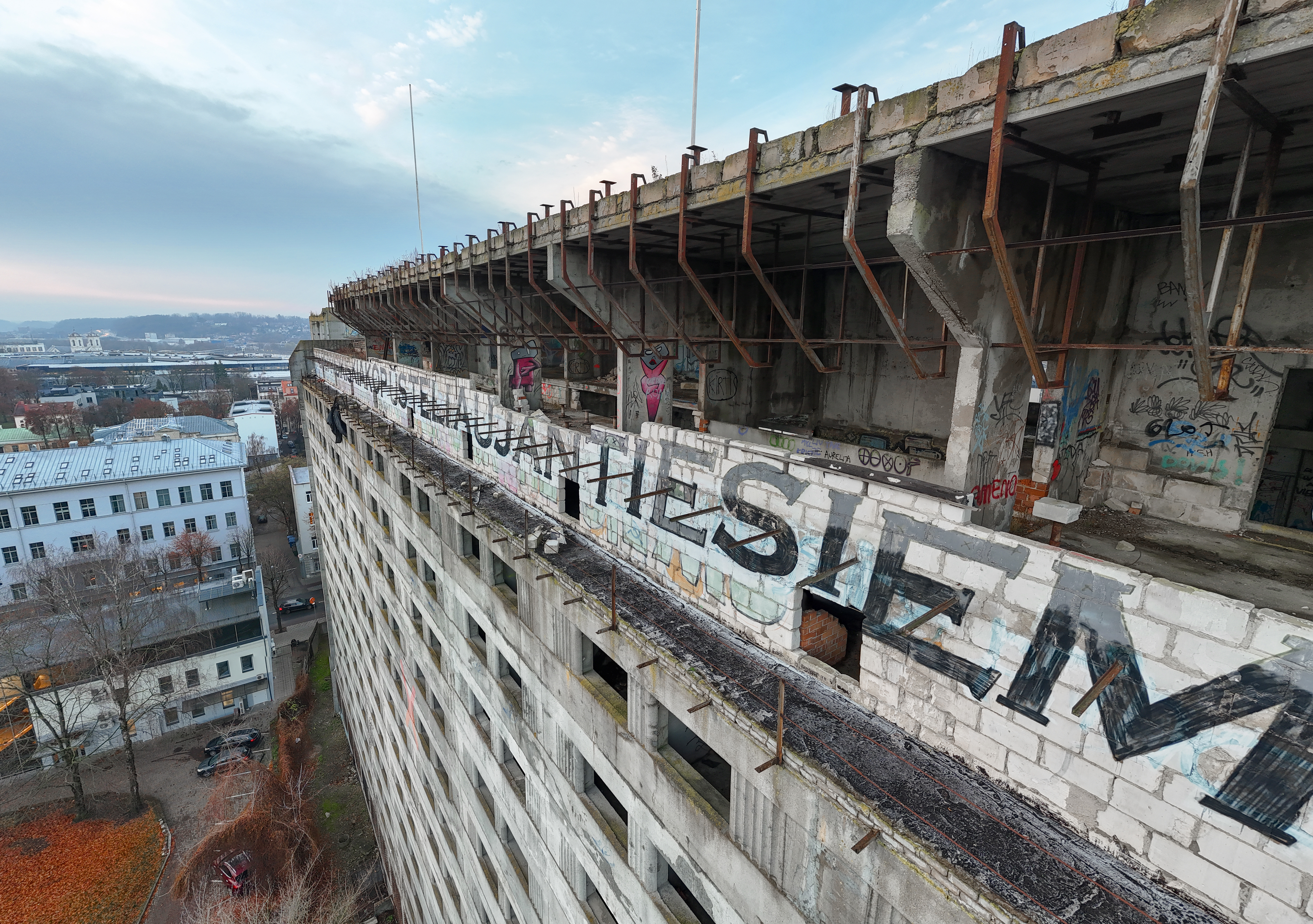
Top floor
