= Basilica of Guadalupe, Monterrey =

Roman Catholic church in Mexico

Coordinates: 25°39′28″N 100°18′52″W

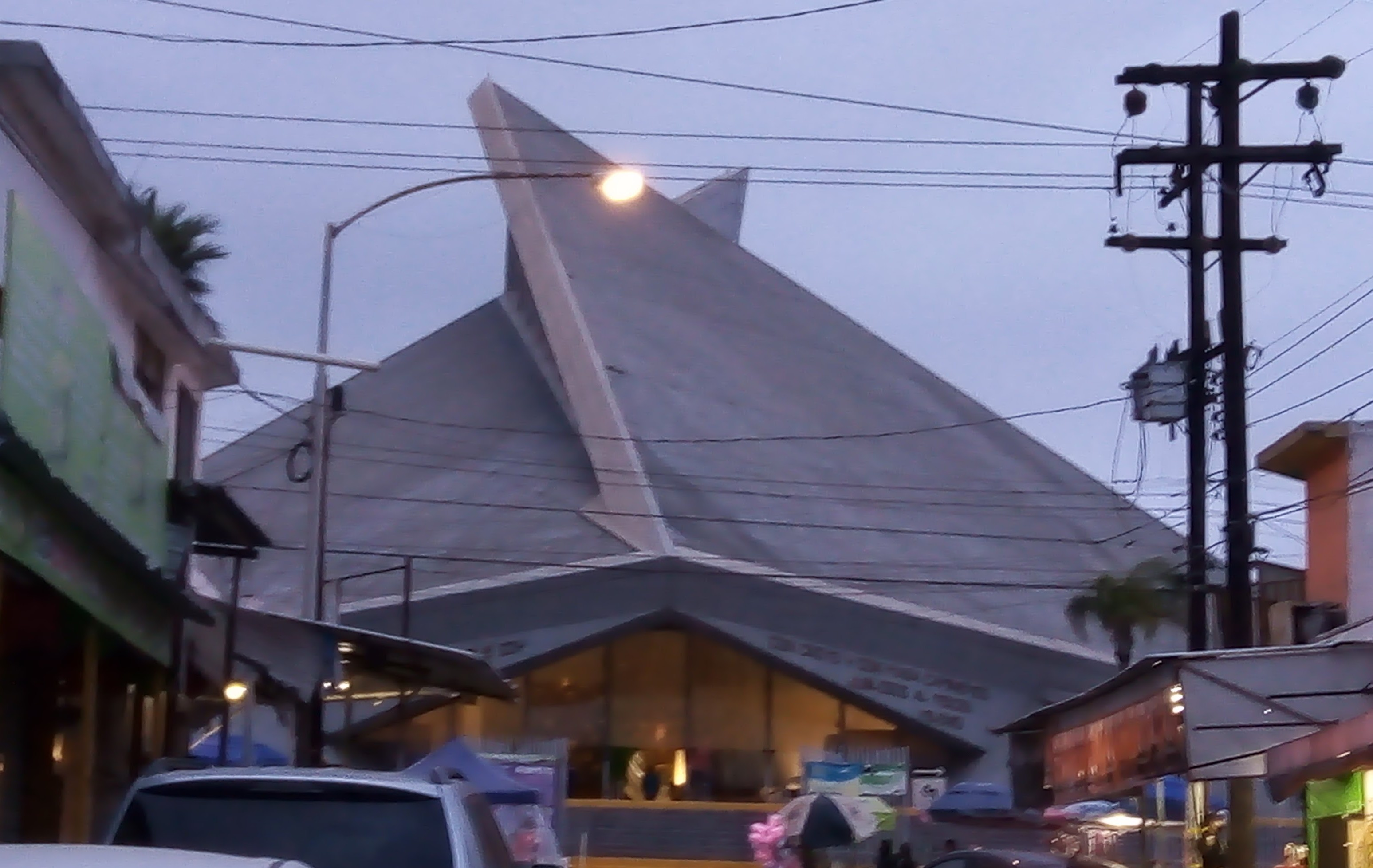
Outside view.

The Basilica of Guadalupe or Santuario de Nuestra Señora de Guadalupe is a Roman Catholic church located in the metropolitan area of Monterrey, Nuevo León, Mexico.

== Old Basilica of Guadalupe ==
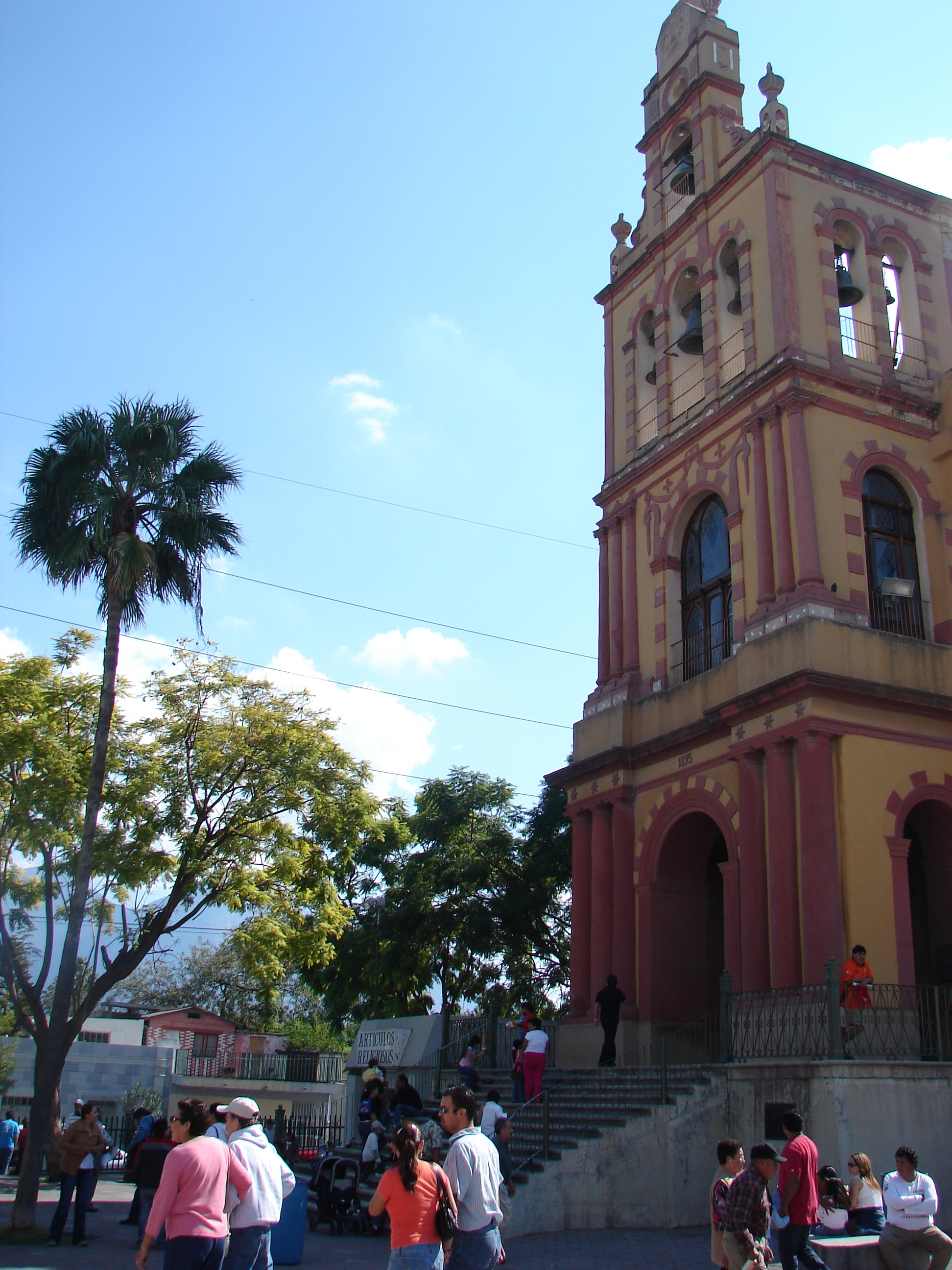
Old Basilica of Guadalupe.

The Old Basilica of Guadalupe is a Roman Catholic building in Monterrey, Nuevo León state, Mexico. It is located in the metropolitan area, just outside the city's downtown.

Francisco de Paula Verea y González de Hermosillo, Bishop of Linares, had a great devotion to the Virgin of Tepeyac. In 1867, he ordered the construction of a small church in her honor. The walls were of ashlar, and there was an oil-on-canvas painting of the Virgin of Guadalupe on the altar. Mass was said out in the open air in front of the church.

In 1895, Santiago de los Santos Garza Zambrano, bishop of Monterrey replaced the small church with a larger stone structure. The area in front of the church became known as La Plaza de Guadalupe, where vendors would set up stalls during the festival celebrations on December 12. Due to the popularity of the sanctuary, in 1905 the government extended the tram line to the area. In 1930, the plaza was renamed for the poet Salvador Díaz Mirón.

The Old basilica has a 1931 four-manual Wurlitzer. In the 1960s, the sanctuary became a parish church for the Colonia Independencia neighborhood. It is the former center for the Basilica of Guadalupe, by which it was replaced in the latter 20th century by the current Basilica complex. It is smaller than its more modern counterpart, which is barely 50 meters away.

== Present basilica ==
Standing in the neighborhood of Colonia Independencia, just outside the city's downtown area, the temple is one of the larger Church edifices in northern Mexico. It is dedicated to Virgin Mary under the title Our Lady of Guadalupe, Patroness of America, who reportedly appeared to St Juan Diego on Tepeyac Hill outside Mexico City in 1531.

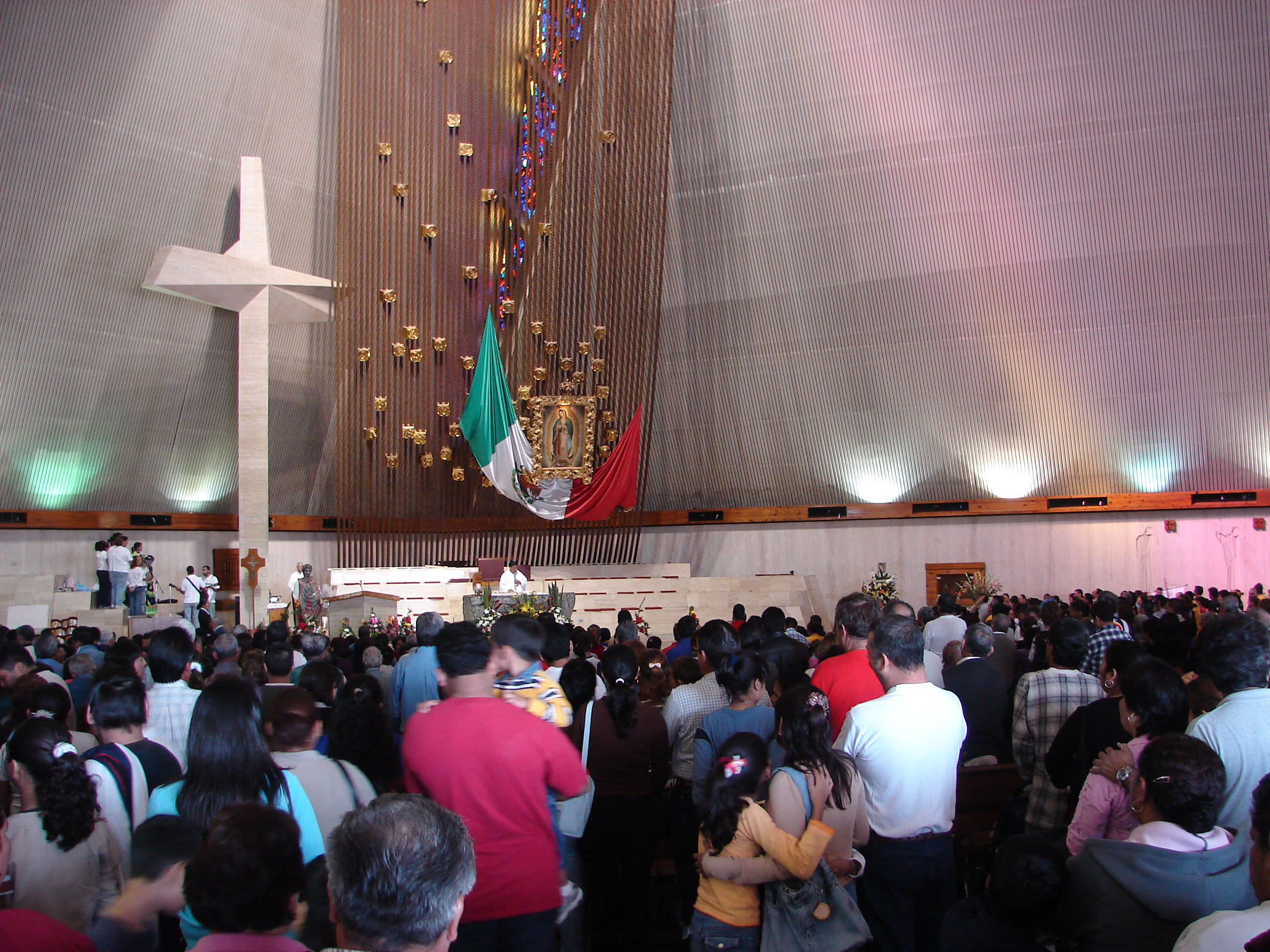
Temple Interior. The National Flag hangs under the image, as in Mexico City.

Year after year, the church becomes the destination for thousands of the faithful devoted to the Virgin, especially on the days prior to her feast day, December 12. On that date, beginning at the stroke of midnight leading into the 12th, mariachis play and sing traditional songs, or the mañanitas, paying tribute to the Virgin.

Usually, the weeks prior to Our Lady's holiday, pilgrimages are made by peregrinos who arrive praying or chanting, and matachines who dance all the way up to the basilica. They all emerge from various directions to converge onto the church to pray and hear Mass in front of the copy of the image of the Guadalupana. The original is in the Mexico City basilica.

On March 14, 2023, Pope Francis allowed the canonical coronation of the venerated copy in the basilica, through the Dicastery for Divine Worship and the Discipline of the Sacraments. A solemn ceremony was held on December 6, 2023, presided by Rogelio Cabrera López, Archbishop of Monterrey.

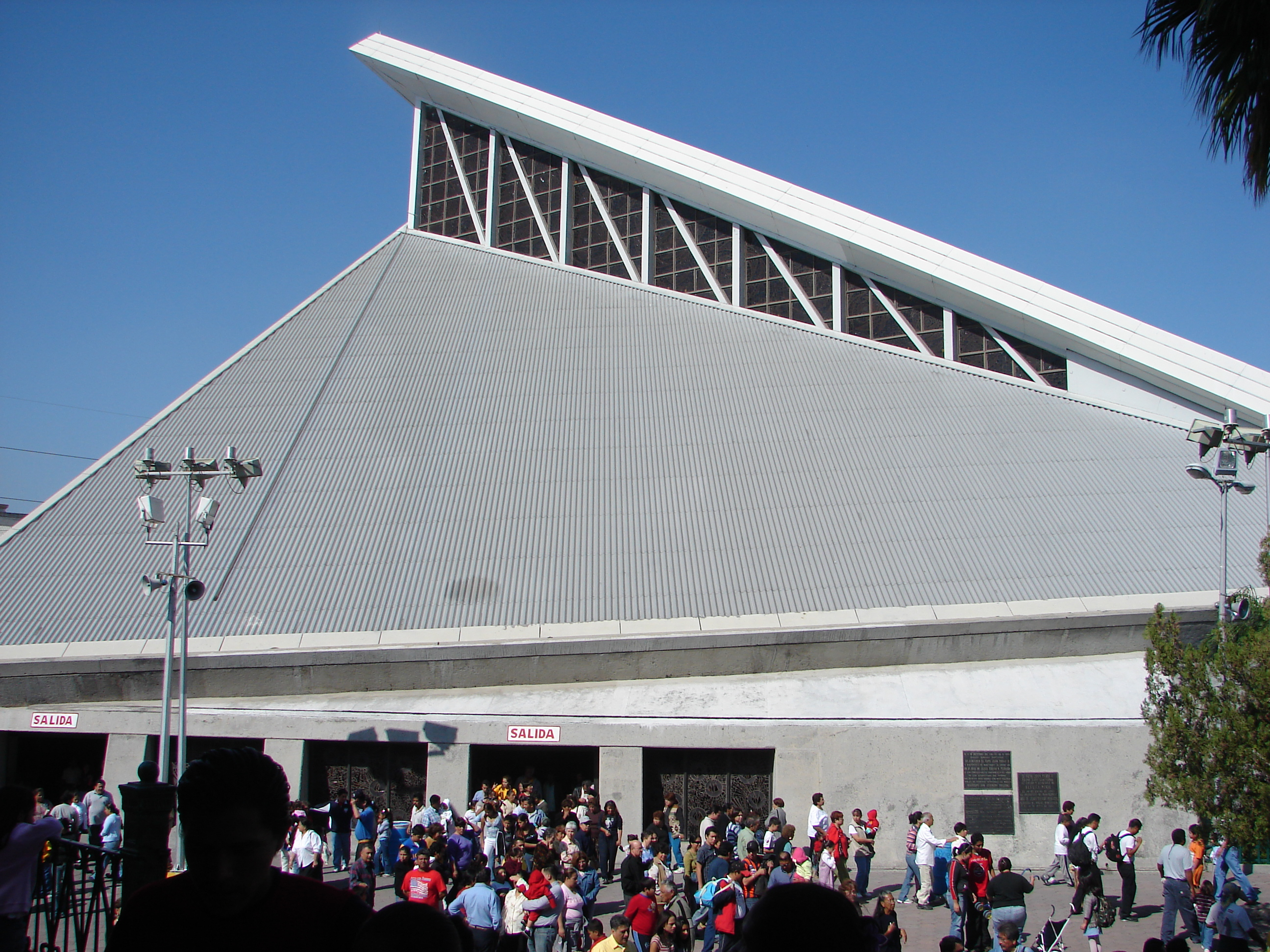
Basilica of Guadalupe (south side)

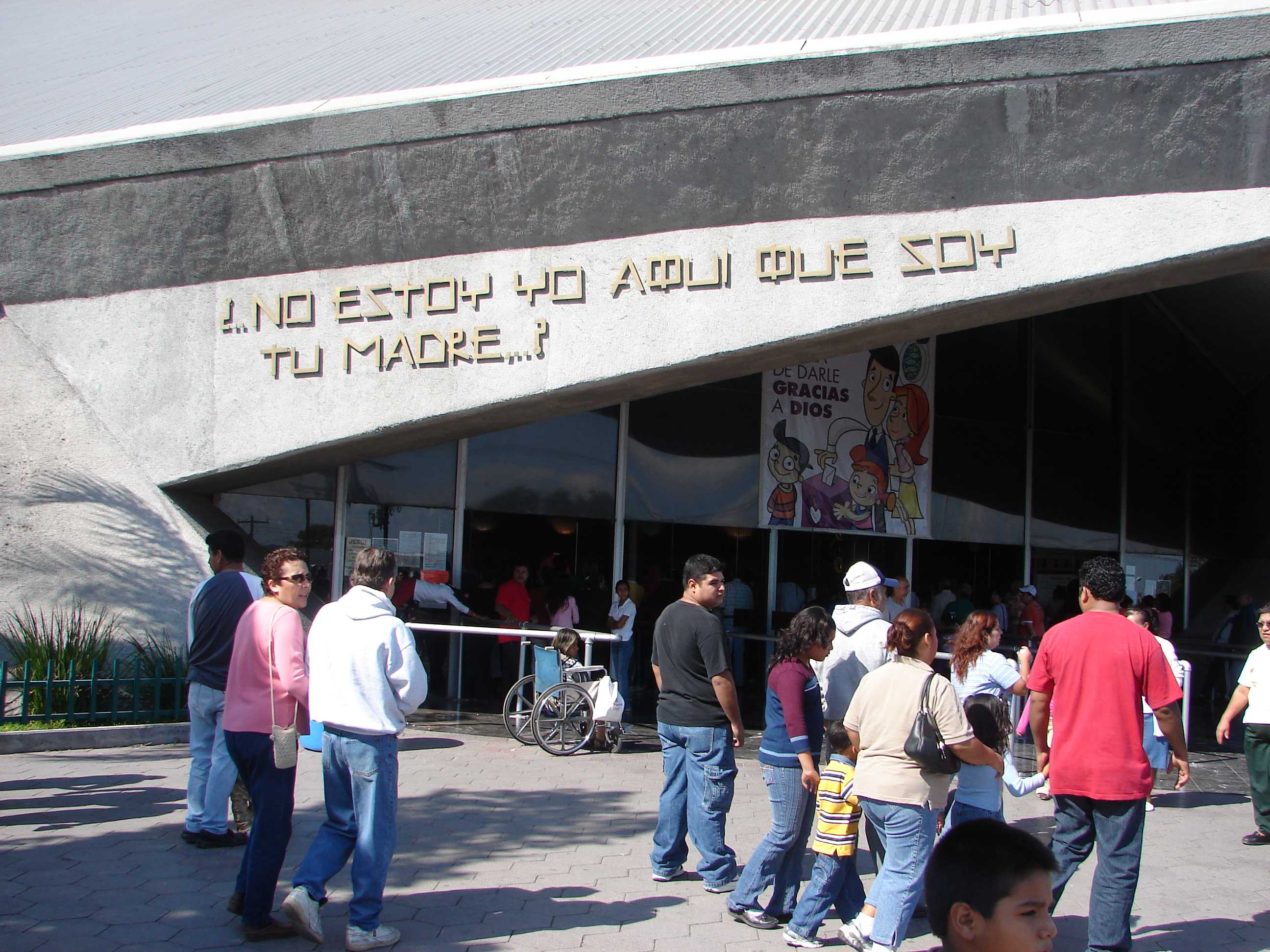
Temple entrance with the motto ¿No estoy yo aquí que soy tu Madre... ?, Spanish for Am I not here, who is your mother?

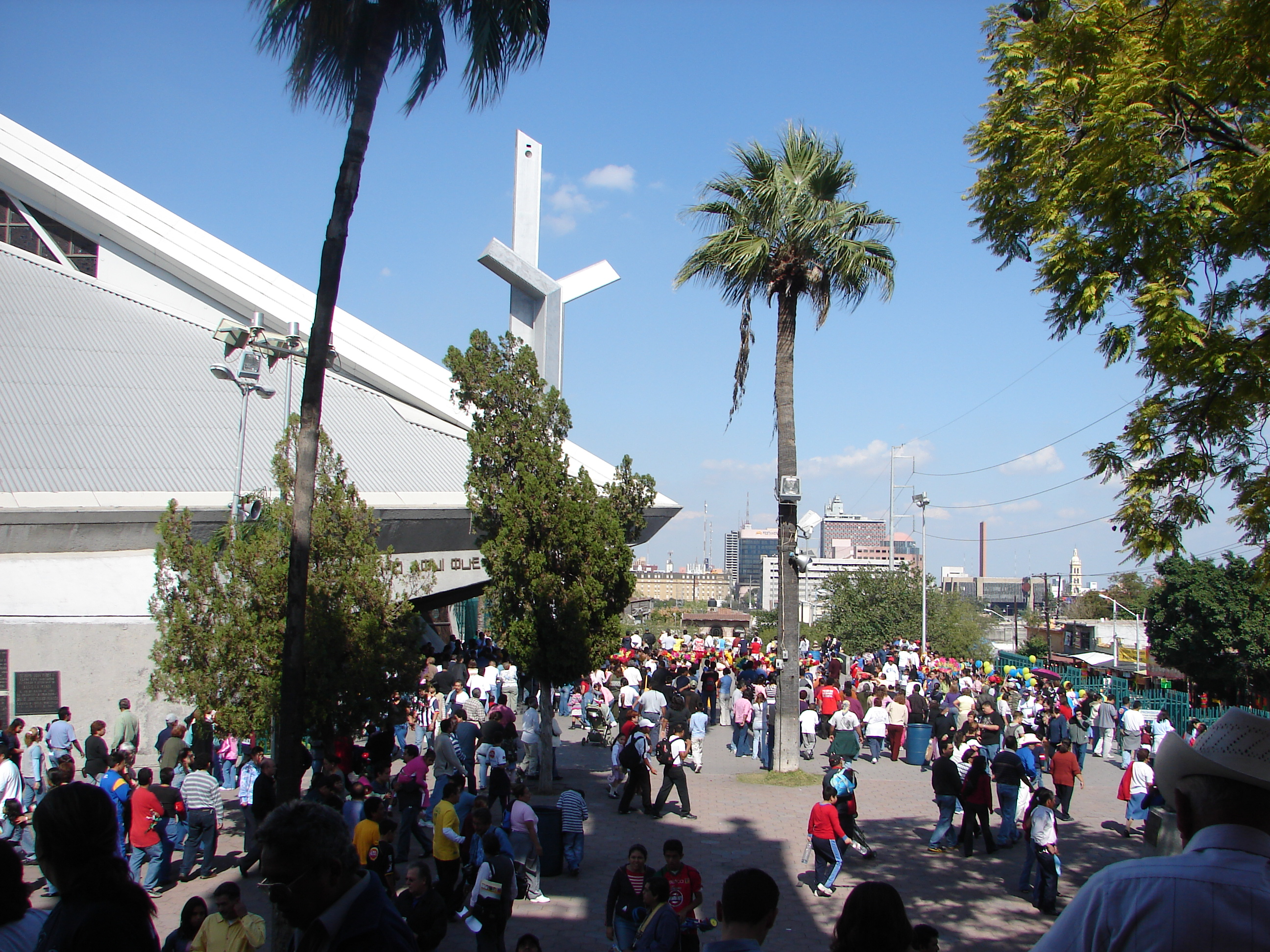
In the background, several downtown buildings.

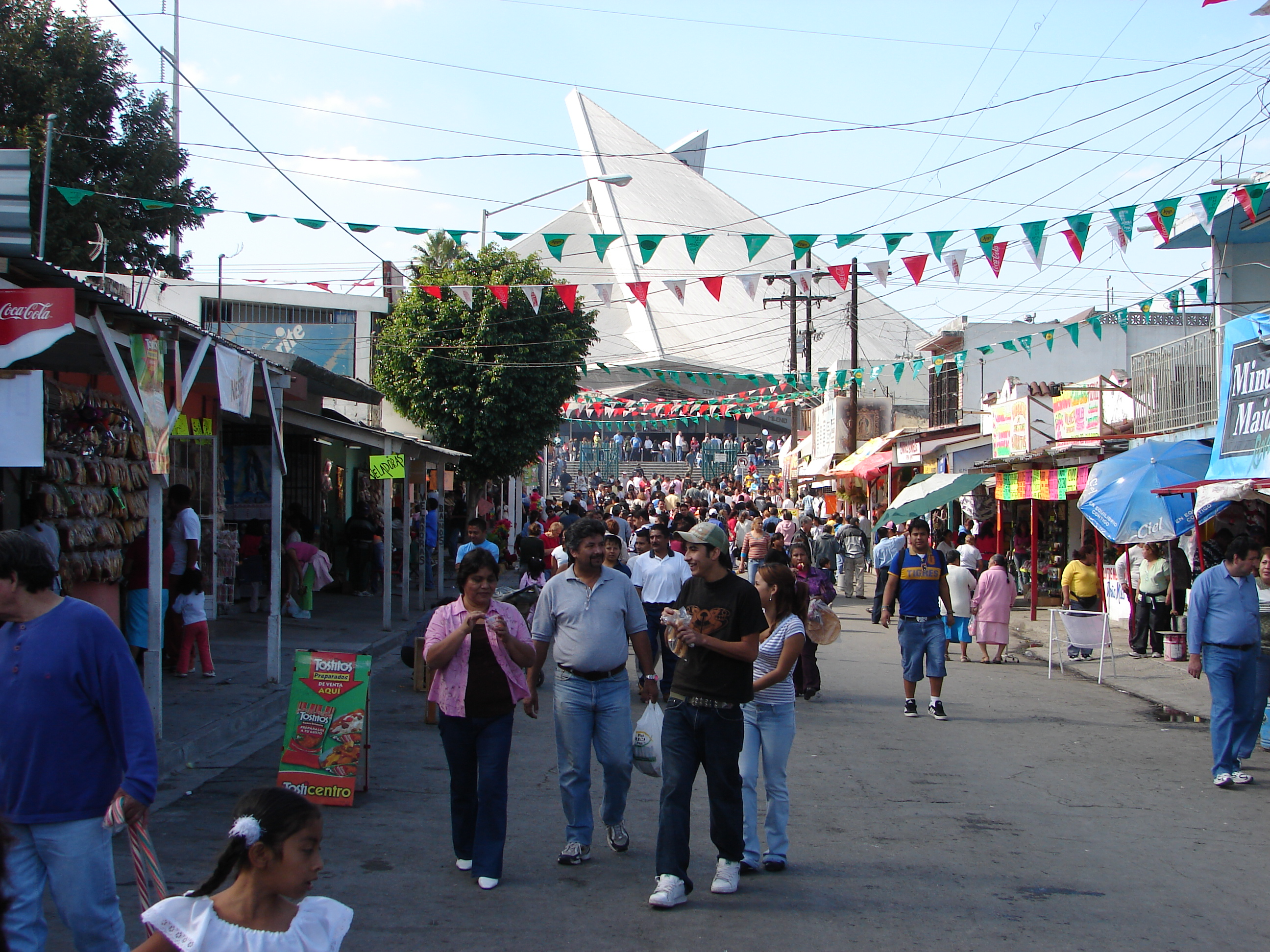
Outside the Basilica, traditional shops.

== Other Monterrey churches ==
Other notable Roman Catholic churches in the area are:

- Catedral Metropolitana de Nuestra Señora de Monterrey
- La Basilica de la Purísima Concepcion - ("La Purisima")
- Capilla de los Dulces Nombres (the Chapel of the Sweet Names)
- San Juan Bautista de La Salle
- Basilica de Nuestra Senora del Roble
- El Sagrado Corazon (Sacred Heart)

== See also ==
- List of basilicas
- List of churches under the patronage of Our Lady of Guadalupe
