= Valdecaballeros Nuclear Power Plant =

Abandoned Nuclear Power Plant in Spain

Coordinates: 39°17′27″N 5°10′50″W

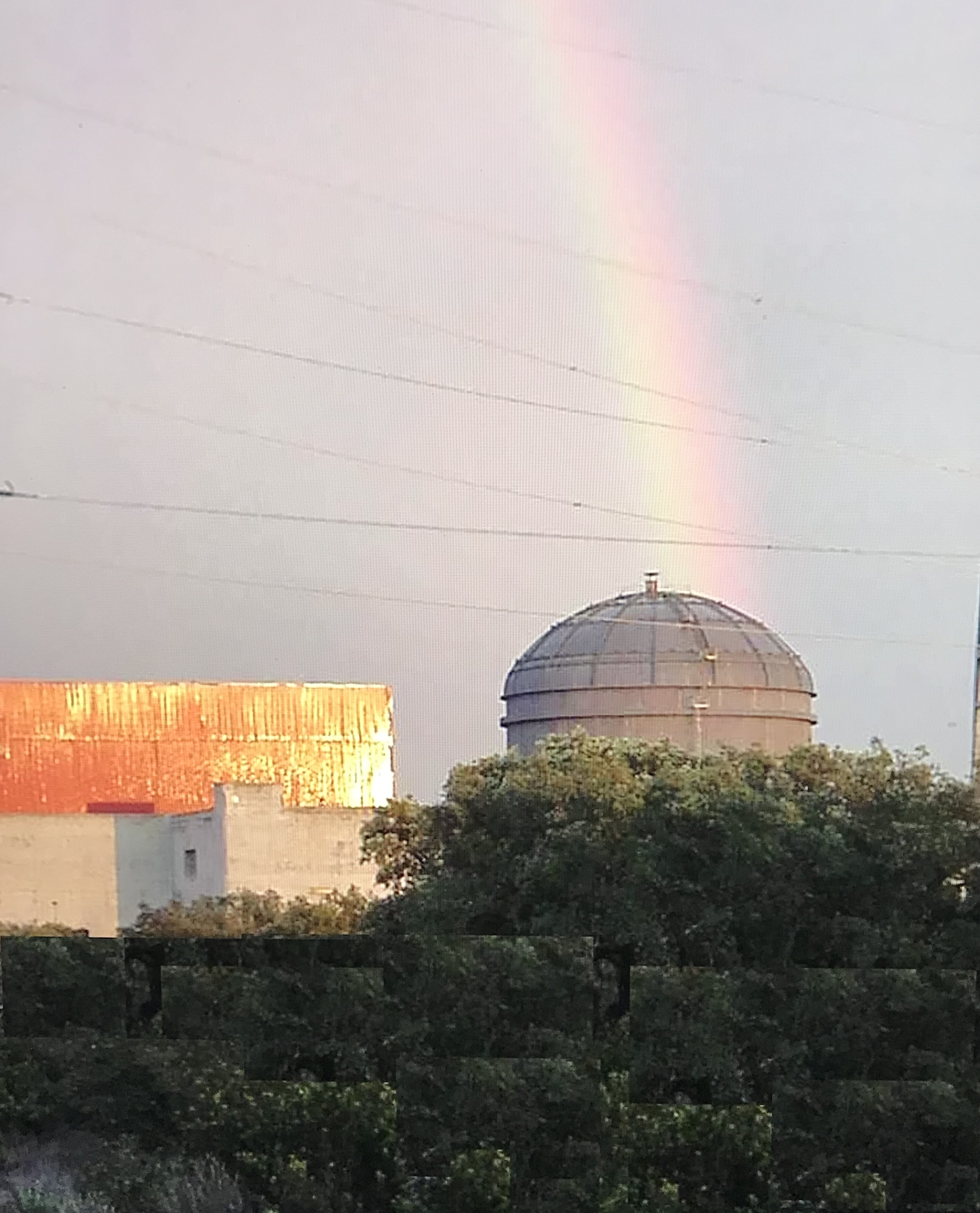
Valdecaballeros Nuclear Power Plant before dismantling

Valdecaballeros Nuclear Power Plant is an abandoned nuclear power plant in the Valdecaballeros municipality, Badajoz Province, Extremadura, Spain. It was under construction in 1983 when the Spanish nuclear power expansion program was cancelled following a change of government. Its two BWRs, each of 975 MWe, were mothballed, one 60% complete and the other 70% complete. In 1994, the decision was taken that the plant would not be completed.

The abandoned nuclear power plant is 4 km north of the town, close to the Guadalupe River which has its mouth in the Guadiana at the Garcia de Sola Dam only 2 km downriver from the plant.
