= Navezuelas =

Navezuelas, Spain
- municipality
- Flag Coat of arms

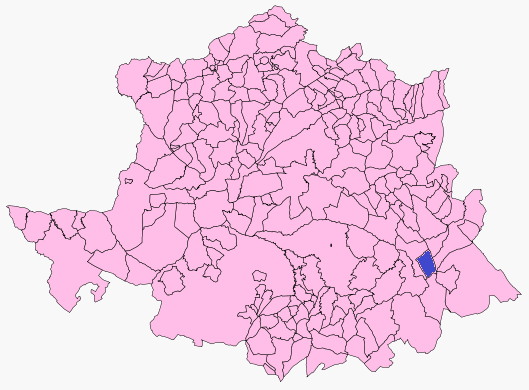
- Coordinates: 39°31′N 5°25′W
- Country: Spain
- Autonomous community: Extremadura
- Province: Cáceres
- Comarca: Las Villuercas

Area
  - Total: 60 km^{2} (23 sq mi)
- Elevation: 930 m (3,050 ft)

Population (2025-01-01)
  - Total: 668
  - Density: 11/km^{2} (29/sq mi)
- Time zone: UTC+1 (CET)
  - Summer (DST): UTC+2 (CEST)
- Website: http://www.navezuelas.es.tl

Navezuelas is a municipality located in the province of Cáceres, Extremadura, Spain. According to the 2005 census (INE), the municipality has a population of 740 inhabitants.

== See also ==
- List of municipalities in Cáceres
