= Valdecaballeros =

- municipality
- Flag Coat of arms
- Interactive map of Valdecaballeros
- Coordinates: 39°14′N 05°11′W
- Country: Spain
- Autonomous community: Extremadura
- Province: Badajoz

Area
  - Total: 90 km^{2} (35 sq mi)
- Elevation: 481 m (1,578 ft)

Population (2025-01-01)
  - Total: 1,036
  - Density: 12/km^{2} (30/sq mi)
- Time zone: UTC+1 (CET)
  - Summer (DST): UTC+2 (CEST)

Valdecaballeros is a municipality located in the province of Badajoz, Extremadura, Spain. According to the 2006 census (INE), the municipality has a population of 1264 inhabitants.

The Guadalupe River has its mouth in the Guadiana at the Garcia de Sola Dam, barely 1.5 km east of Valdecaballeros. The uncompleted Valdecaballeros Nuclear Power Plant is close to the town.

== See also ==
- List of municipalities in Badajoz
