= Guadalupe (Spain) =

River in Spain

Guadalupe Guadalupejo
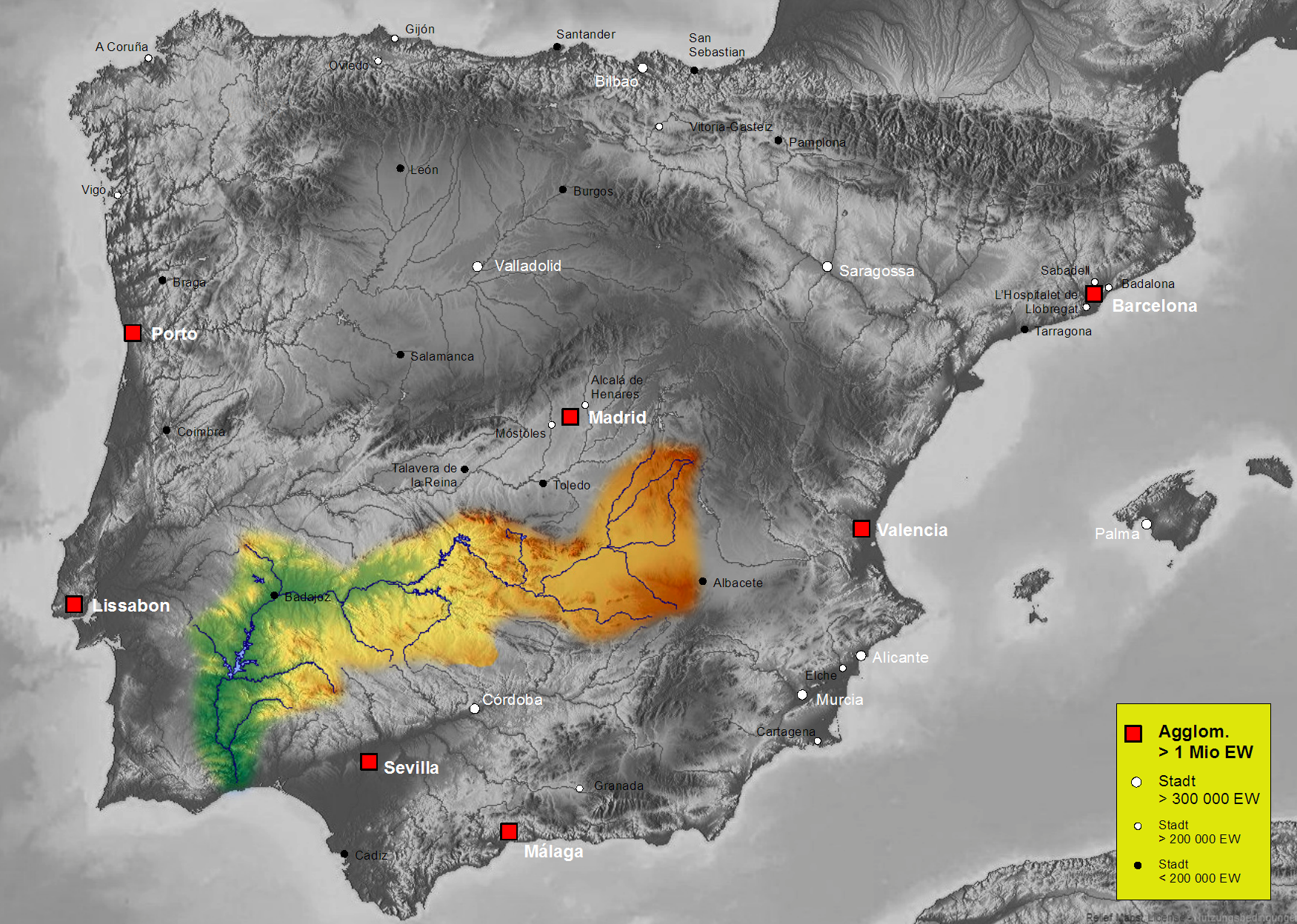
- The watershed of the Guadiana

Location
- Country: Spain

Physical characteristics
- Source: Pedreras de los Hollicios, near La Villuerca
  - location: Guadalupe, Extremadura, Spain
  - elevation: 1,157 m (3,796 ft)
- Mouth: Guadiana
  - location: Valdecaballeros, Extremadura, Spain
  - coordinates: 39°14′15″N 5°8′58″W
  - elevation: 391 m (1,283 ft)
- Length: 40.56 km (25.20 mi)

Basin features
- Progression: Guadiana→ Gulf of Cádiz

The Guadalupe or Guadalupejo is a river in the west of the Iberian Peninsula, a right-bank tributary of the Guadiana, which discharges into the Atlantic Ocean. Its course runs through the Spanish provinces of Cáceres and Badajoz.

== Course ==
The Guadalupe has its source in the place of Pedreras de los Hollicios, near La Villuerca.

It flows southwards into the Guadiana at the García Sola Reservoir, barely 1.5 km east of Valdecaballeros. There is an abandoned nuclear power plant, the Valdecaballeros Nuclear Power Plant, as well as a small dam near its mouth.

== Etymology ==
The name is believed to be derived from the Arabic phrase وادي اللب, wādī al-lubb, 'hidden river', or "river of the core", because the river narrows down as it flows near to the town of Guadalupe.

An alternative etymological explanation, which is commonly found on the internet, states that the name may have derived from the Arabic word for 'valley' or 'river' (wadi) and the Latin word lupus, meaning 'wolf'. Some find it unlikely that Arabic and Latin would be combined in this way, and suggest as an alternative the Arabic "Wadi-al-lub", signifying a river with black stones in its bed.

Another possibility is that it comes from وادي الحب, wādī al-hubb, meaning "River of Love".

The river gives its name to the town of Guadalupe, and by extension to the monastery of Santa María de Guadalupe. The Francization of the toponym gave its name to the Guadeloupe island in the Caribbean.

== See also ==
- List of rivers of Spain
