= Guadalupe, Cáceres =

Guadalupe
- Municipality
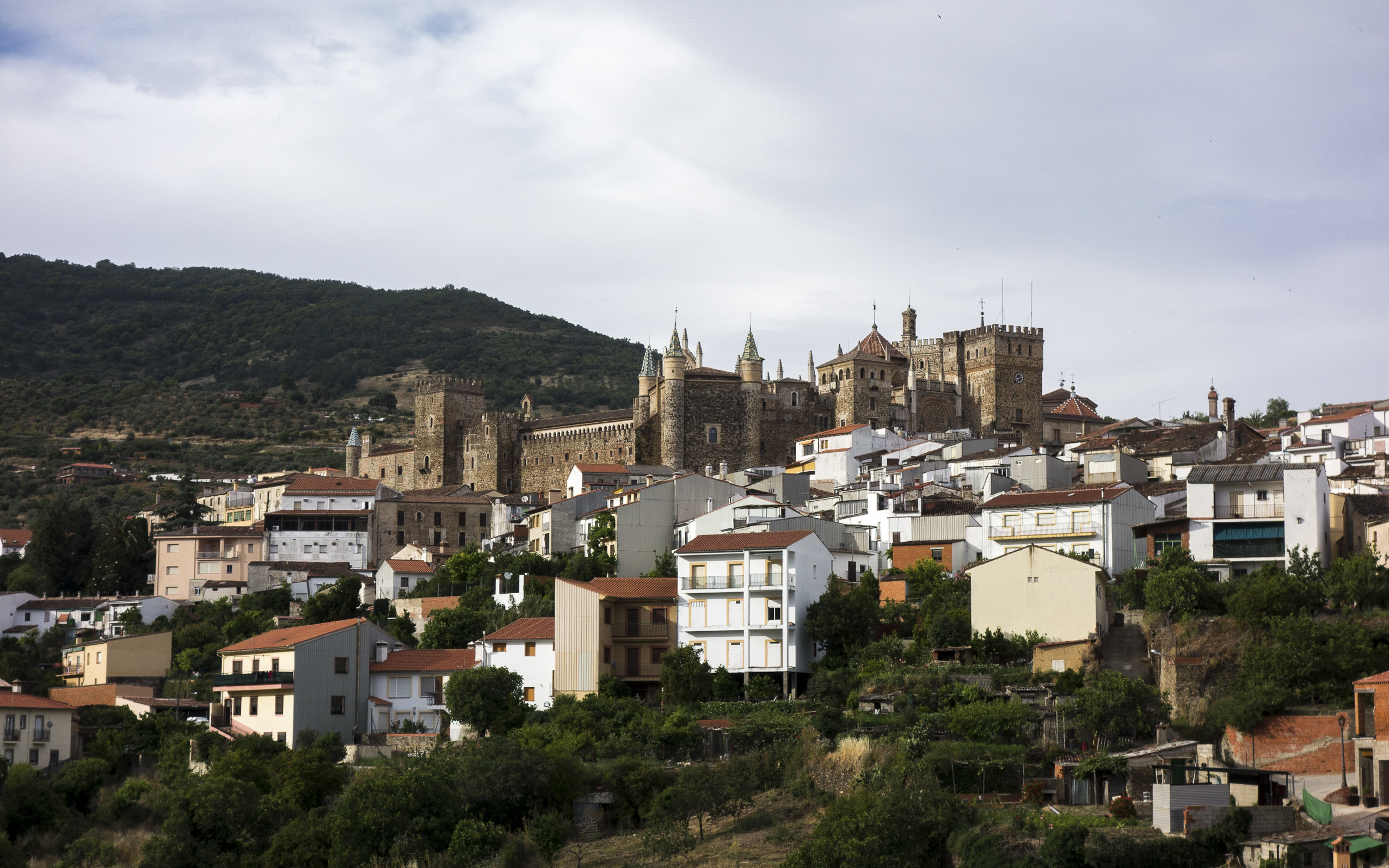

- Flag Coat of arms
- Interactive map of Guadalupe
- Location within mainland Spain
- Coordinates: 39°27′10″N 5°19′39″W
- Country: Spain
- Autonomous community: Extremadura
- Province: Cáceres

Area
  - Total: 68.19 km^{2} (26.33 sq mi)
- Elevation: 640 m (2,100 ft)

Population (2025-01-01)
  - Total: 1,722
  - Density: 25.25/km^{2} (65.40/sq mi)
- Time zone: UTC+1 (CET)
  - Summer (DST): UTC+2 (CEST)

Guadalupe (Extremaduran: Guadalupi) is a municipality of Spain located in the province of Cáceres, Extremadura. It has a total area of 68.19 km^{2} (23¼ sq. mi.) and, as of 1 January 2021, a registered population of 1,822. The monastery of Santa María de Guadalupe is situated here.

== Geography ==
The Guadalupe River has its origins near the town in the Sierra de las Villuercas. Its highest point, the Pico la Villuerca reaches an altitude of 1603 metres (5260 feet).

== History ==
According to tradition, a shepherd discovered a carved statue of the Virgin Mary in the Guadalupe River in the late 13th or early 14th century. A hermitage was built near the site where the image was found, around which the current settlement, named Puebla de Santa María de Guadalupe, developed. Since the construction of the first sanctuary, Guadalupe has become the second most important pilgrimage site on the Iberian Peninsula after Santiago de Compostela—a status it maintains today through pilgrimages arriving from across Spain via the Paths of Guadalupe. This prominence stems from the Virgin of Guadalupe’s role as the patron saint of all Spanish-speaking lands and her title as Queen of the Spains in Catholic tradition, while Santiago (St. James) remains the patron saint of Spain itself. The Royal Monastery of Santa María de Guadalupe is regarded as one of Extremadura’s most iconic landmarks, and the Virgin of Guadalupe is also the region’s patron saint. The town boasts numerous historical monuments alongside the monastery.

Guadalupe has been listed among The Most Beautiful Villages of Spain (Los Pueblos Más Bonitos de España) since 2018 and has been a member of the association since then.

On 14 December 2017, Guadalupe was awarded the title of First Rural Wonder of 2017. This recognition was followed by its victory in the Ferrero Rocher "Showcase Your Village" (Luce tu Pueblo) contest to select Spain’s Most Beautiful and "Good" Village, officially granted on 16 December 2017. Additionally, Guadalupe hosted the national broadcast of the 2019 New Year’s Eve bell-ringing ceremony. The town was also honored with the Ferrero Rocher prize, and its residents received samples of Ferrero Rocher chocolates.

== See also ==
- Monastery of Santa María de Guadalupe
- List of municipalities in Cáceres
