= Monastery of Saint Mary of Guadalupe =

Roman Catholic monastery in Guadalupe, Extremadura, Spain

Royal Monastery of Saint Mary of Guadalupe
- Real Monasterio de Santa María de Guadalupe
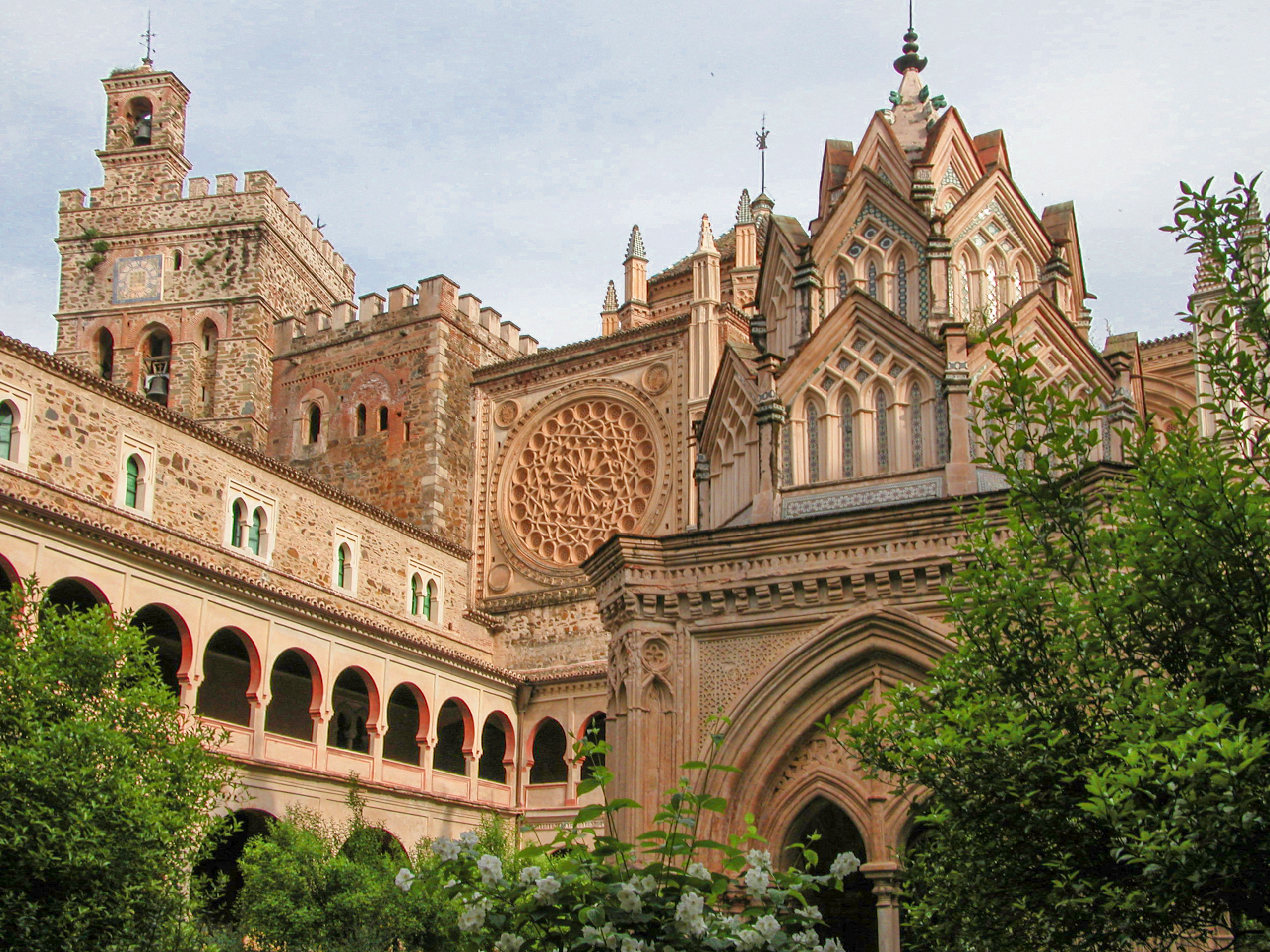

- Location within Spain

Religion
- Affiliation: Catholic
- Ecclesiastical or organizational status: Monastery

Location
- Location: Guadalupe (Cáceres), Spain
- Interactive map of Royal Monastery of Saint Mary of Guadalupe
- Coordinates: 39°27′10″N 5°19′39″W

Architecture
- UNESCO World Heritage Site
- Criteria: Cultural: (iv), (vi)
- Designated: 1993 (17th session)
- Reference no.: 665
- Region: Europe and North America
- Area: 1.1 ha (2.7 acres)
- Buffer zone: 43.65 ha (107.9 acres)
- Spanish Cultural Heritage
- Type: Non-movable
- Criteria: Monument
- Designated: 1 March 1879
- Reference no.: RI-51-0000024

The Royal Monastery of Saint Mary of Guadalupe (Spanish: Real Monasterio de Santa María de Guadalupe) is a Roman Catholic monastic establishment built during the 14th century located in Guadalupe, in Extremadura, Spain. It is located at the foot of the eastern side of the Sierra de las Villuercas and was one of the finest and most important monasteries in the country for more than four centuries. UNESCO declared it a World Heritage Site in 1993.

== History ==
The monastery had its origins in the late 13th century, when a shepherd from Cáceres, named Gil Cordero, discovered on the bank of the Guadalupe River a statue of the Blessed Virgin, which had been apparently hidden by local inhabitants from Moorish invaders in 714. On the site of his discovery a chapel was built, dedicated under the title of Our Lady of Guadalupe.

King Alfonso XI, who visited the chapel more than once, invoked Santa Maria de Guadalupe in the Battle of Rio Salado. After gaining the victory, he ascribed it to the Madonna's intercession, declared the church at Guadalupe a royal sanctuary and undertook an extensive rebuilding program.

In 1389, the Hieronymite monks took over the monastery and made it their principal house. Construction works continued under the auspices of the order's first prior, and in 1474 Henry IV of Castile was entombed in Guadalupe, next to his mother.

King Ferdinand II of Aragon issued the Sentencia Arbitral de Guadalupe at the monastery on 21 April 1486, thus effectively ending the onerous evil customs allowing medieval nobles in Catalonia to maltreat the remensa peasants and tie them to their lands.

The monastery has rich associations with the New World, including the Guadeloupe island in the Caribbean. It was here in Extremadura where Christopher Columbus made his first pilgrimage after discovering America in 1492 and where he first thanked heaven for his discovery.

Even after the monks from Guadalupe founded the famous monastery of Escorial, which was much closer to the royal capital, Madrid, Santa Maria de Guadalupe retained the royal patronage. It remained the most important cloister in Spain until the Confiscation of monasteries in 1835. In the 20th century, the monastery was revived by the Franciscan Order and Pope Pius XII declared the shrine a "Minor Papal Basilica" in 1955.

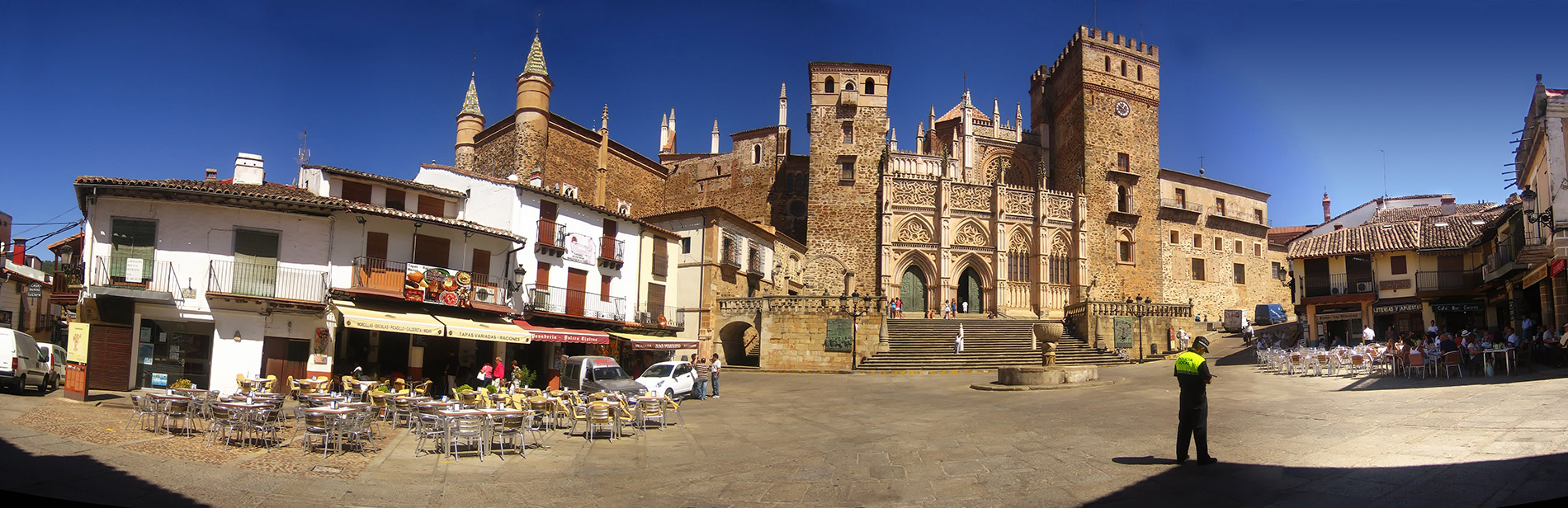
Overview of the main facade and the square that lies before it.

== Monuments ==
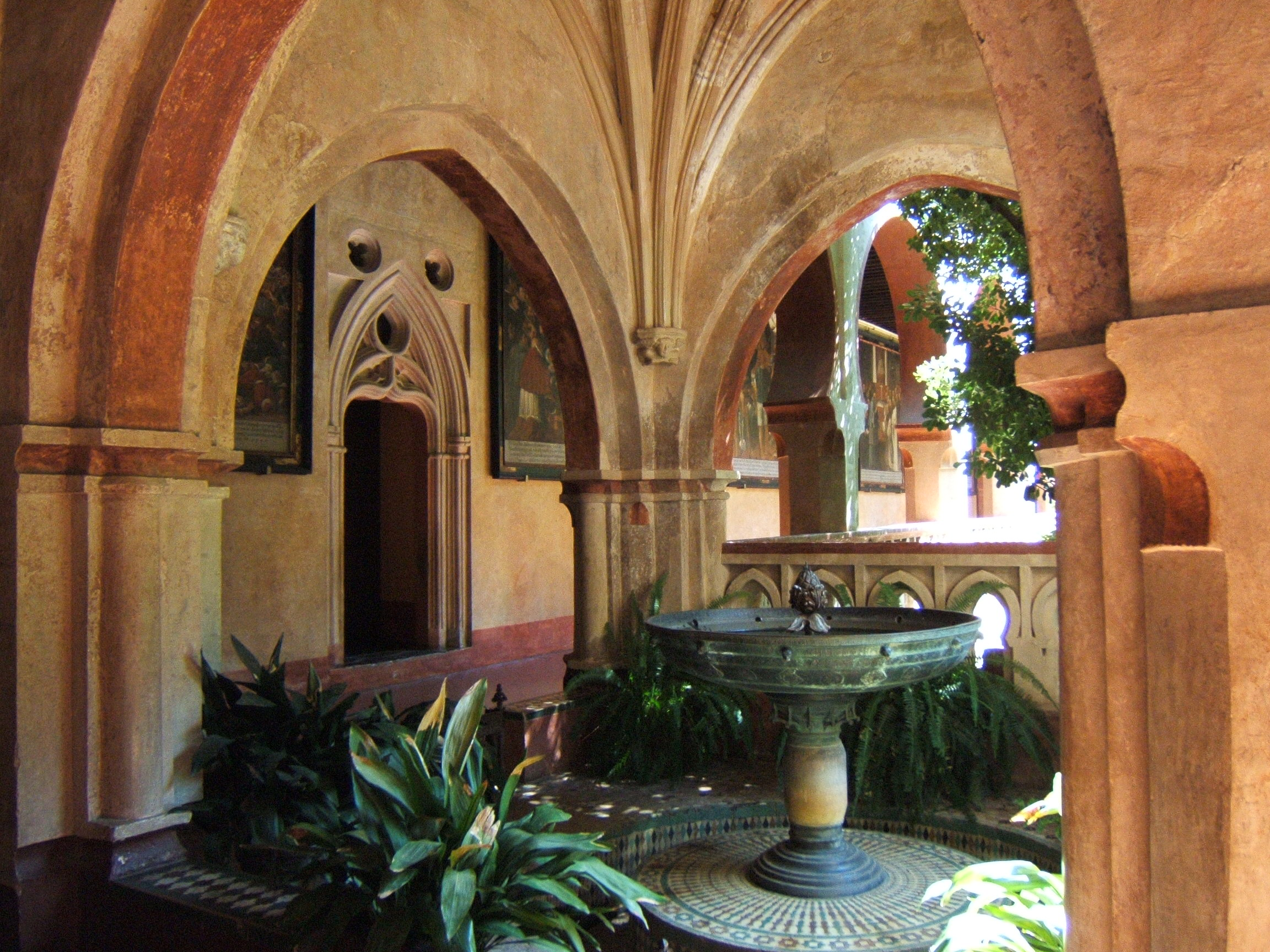
Mudéjar fountain

The monastery, whose architecture evolved throughout many centuries, is still dominated by the templo mayor, or the main church, built by Alfonso XI and his immediate successors in the 14th and 15th centuries. The square chapel of Santa Catalina is also of the 15th century; it is known for a cluster of ornate 17th-century tombs. The 16th-century reliquaries chapel connects Santa Catalina with the baroque sacristy (1638–1647), lavishly decorated and boasting a series of paintings by Zurbarán.

Behind the basilica is Camarin de la Virgen, an octagonal baroque structure (1687–1696) with the stuccoed Chamber of the Virgin and nine paintings by Luca Giordano. The jewel of this profusely ornamented hall is a throne containing the statue of the Madonna which gave the monastery its name.

Other notable structures include the Mudéjar cloister (1389–1405), with the magnificent Plateresque portal; the late Gothic cloister from 1531–1533, and the new church, commissioned by one of Columbus's descendants in 1730. Regrettably, the palace of Isabella I of Castile (1487–1491) was pulled down in 1856.

The sanctuary is divided into:

- Stewardship or portería
- Basilica Temple (finished in 15th century)
- Mudéjar cloister (finished in 14th century)
- Gothic cloister and Welcomer (finished in 14th century)
- Temple of the Holy Trinity (finished in 18th century) (since 1978 dedicated to Auditorium)
- Embroidery Museum: liturgical vestments made in its embroidery workshop and includes pieces that cover the period between 15th and 19th centuries
- Museum of Books and Cantonals: more than ninety examples are exhibited, gigantic cantonals and two 15th-century passionaries.
- Museum of sculpture and painting: include paintings by Goya and El Greco, along with Anequín carvings by Egas Cueman or a crucified ivory Christ attributed to Michelangelo. The canvases of Zurbarán are in the old sacristy.
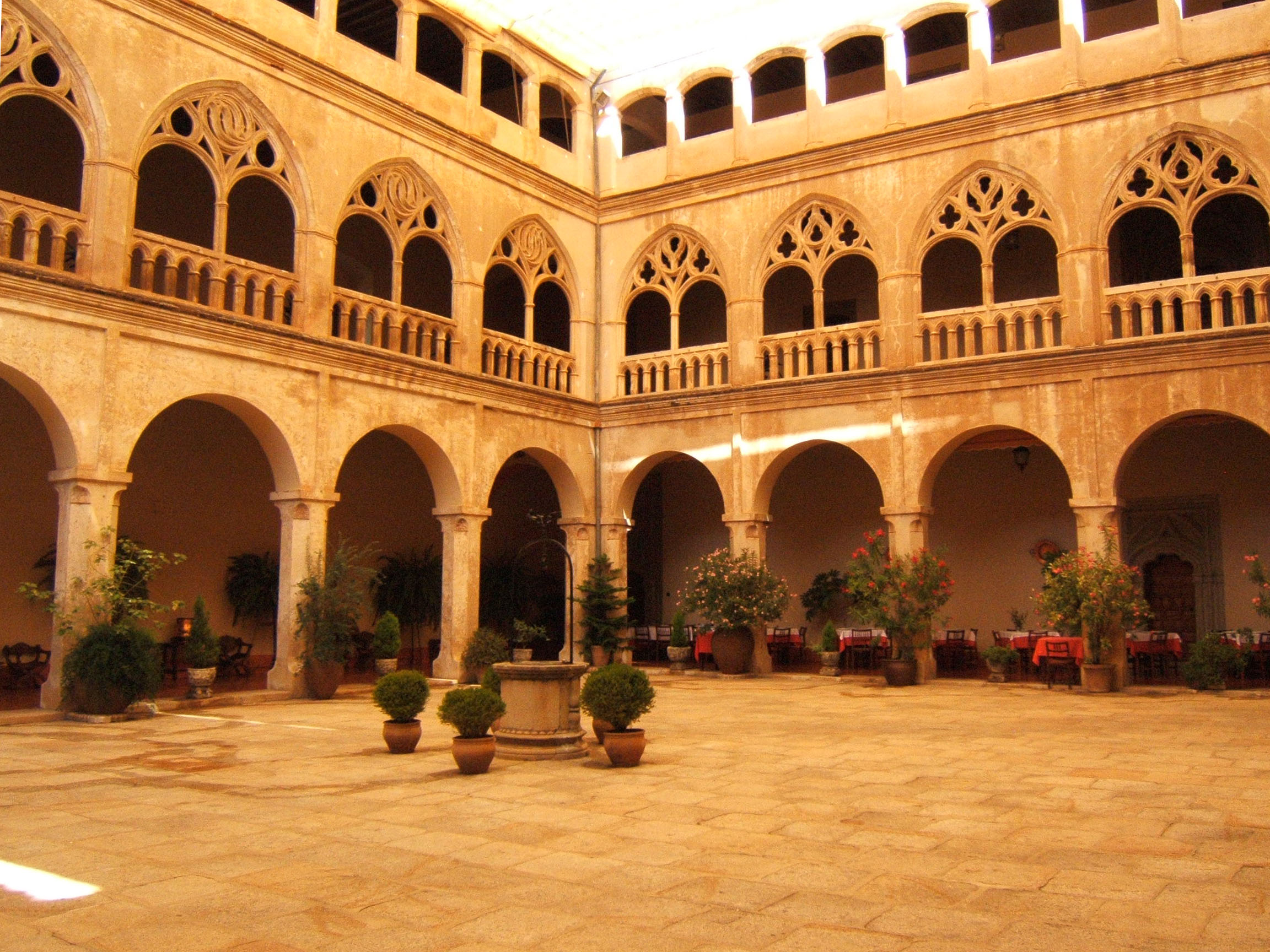
Gothic cloister

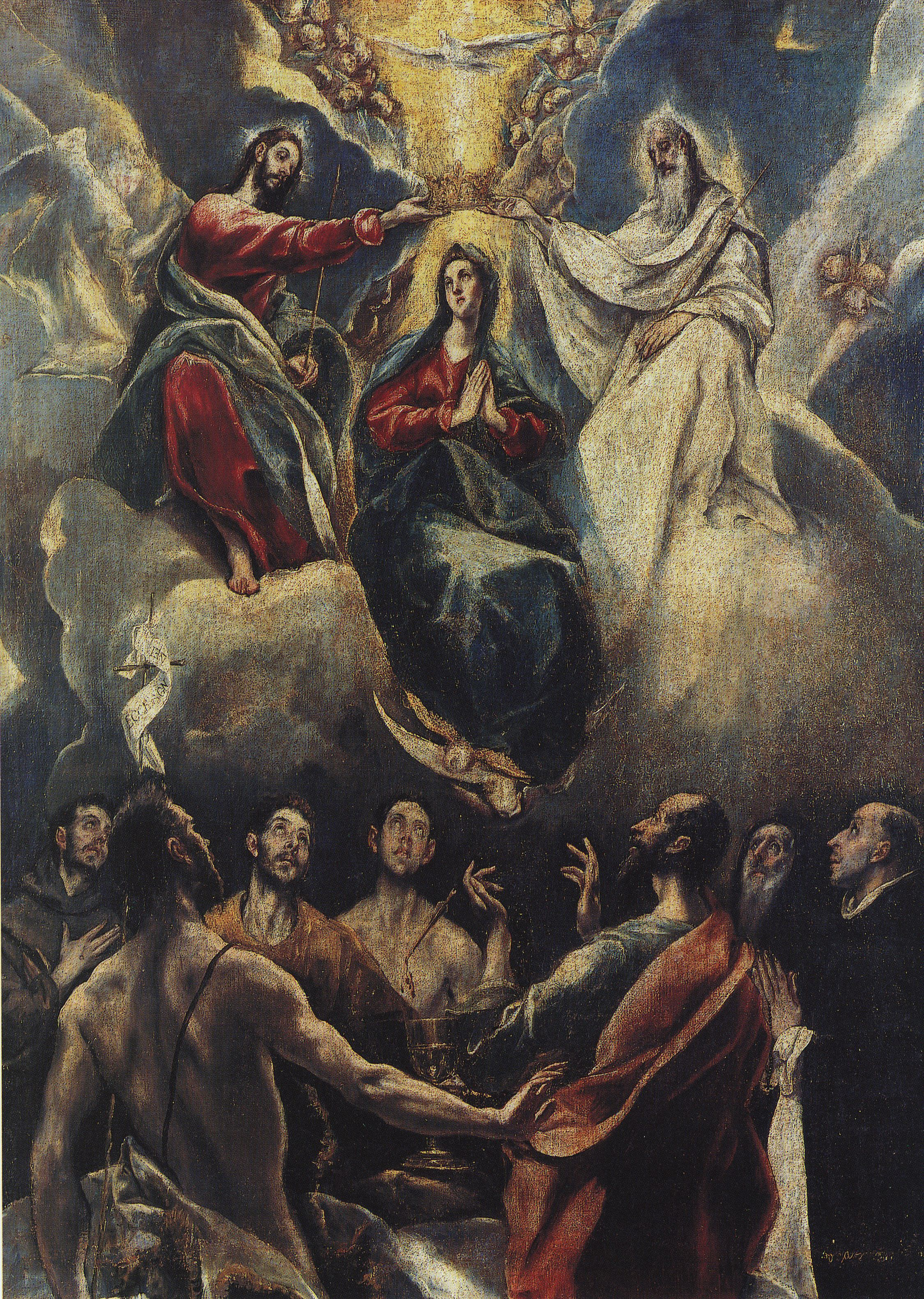
Coronation of the Virgin, by El Greco, 1591.

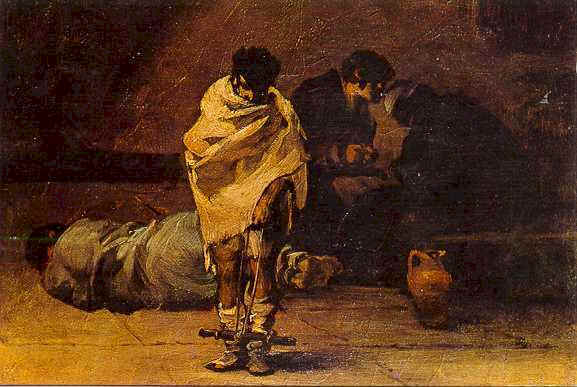
Confessions in Prison, Goya, 1808-1812.

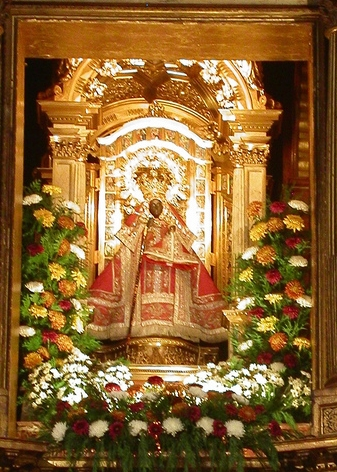
Our Lady of Guadalupe in Extremadura

== Burials ==
- Denis, Lord of Cifuentes

== See also ==
- Our Lady of Guadalupe
- List of churches dedicated to Our Lady of Guadalupe
- Basilica of Our Lady of Guadalupe
