= Guadalupe =

Guadalupe or Guadeloupe may refer to:

== Places ==
=== Bolivia ===
- Guadalupe, Potosí

=== Brazil ===
- Guadalupe, Piauí, a municipality in the state of Piauí
- Guadalupe, Rio de Janeiro, a neighbourhood in the city of Rio de Janeiro

=== Colombia ===
- Guadalupe, Antioquia, a municipality and town
- Guadalupe, Huila, a municipality and town
- Guadalupe, Santander, a municipality and town
- Guadalupe Hill, a hill in Bogotá

=== Costa Rica ===
- Guadalupe, Costa Rica, a suburb of San José, Costa Rica

=== El Salvador ===
- Guadalupe, El Salvador

=== France ===
- Guadeloupe, a French overseas department in the Caribbean

=== Mexico ===
- Guadalupe, Baja California
- Guadalupe, Chihuahua
- Guadalupe, Nuevo León, part of the metropolitan area of Monterrey
- Guadalupe Etla, Oaxaca
- Guadalupe, Puebla, see Municipalities of Puebla
- Guadalupe, Zacatecas
- Guadalupe de Ramírez, Oaxaca
- Guadalupe y Calvo, Chihuahua
- Villa de Guadalupe, Mexico City, a town near Mexico City, now a suburb incorporated into the city
- Presa de Guadalupe, lake near Cuautitlán Izcalli
- Guadalupe Island, an oceanic island off Baja California

=== Peru ===
- Guadalupe, Peru

=== Philippines ===
- Guadalupe, Cebu City, a barangay in Cebu City, Cebu
- Guadalupe Nuevo and Guadalupe Viejo, two barangays in Makati

=== Portugal ===
- Nossa Senhora de Guadalupe, a civil parish in Évora
- Guadalupe (Santa Cruz da Graciosa), a civil parish in the municipality of Santa Cruz da Graciosa, island of Graciosa, Azores

=== São Tomé and Príncipe ===
- Guadalupe, São Tomé and Príncipe

=== Spain ===
- Guadalupe, Cáceres, a municipality in Extremadura
- Guadalupe, Murcia, a village in the municipality and region of Murcia
- Guadalupe (Spain), a river

=== United States ===
- Guadalupe, Arizona, a town
- Guadalupe, California, a city
- Guadalupe County, Colorado Territory, former name of Conejos County
- Guadalupe, Colorado, an unincorporated community
- Guadalupe County, New Mexico
- Guadalupe County, Texas
- Guadalupe Mountains, in New Mexico and Texas
- Guadalupe Mountains National Park, Texas
- Guadalupe River (California)
- Guadalupe River (Texas)
- Guadalupe-Nipomo Dunes, in California

== Ships ==
- USS Guadalupe (AO-32), a United States Navy replenishment oiler in commission from 1941 to 1974
- USNS Guadalupe (T-AO-200), a United States Navy fleet replenishment oiler in service since 1992

== Other uses ==
- Guadalupe (name)
- Guadalupe (film), a 2006 film concerning archaeologists
- Guadalupe (Mexican TV series), a 1984 Mexican telenovela television series that aired on Canal de las Estrellas
- Guadalupe (U.S. TV series), a 1993 American Spanish-language telenovela television series that was broadcast on Telemundo

== See also ==
- Guadalupe District (disambiguation), several locations
- Guadalupe Municipality (disambiguation), several municipalities
- Sierra de Guadalupe (disambiguation)
- Valle de Guadalupe (disambiguation), several locations
- Our Lady of Guadalupe, the patroness of Mexico, the Americas, and secondary Patroness of the Philippines
  - Basilica of Our Lady of Guadalupe in Mexico City
- Our Lady of Guadalupe, Extremadura, Marian shrine in Extremadura, Spain
