= Lupita =

The name Lupita is a diminutive of Lupe (disambiguation), itself a shortening of Guadalupe. It may refer to:

== People ==
- Lupita D'Alessio (born 1954), Mexican singer and actress
- Lupita Ferrer (born 1943), Venezuelan actress
- Lupita González (born 1989), Mexican racewalker
- Lupita Infante, American singer-songwriter
- Lupita Jones (born 1968), Mexican businesswoman, former model and beauty queen
- Lupita Nyong'o (born 1983), Kenyan-Mexican actress
- Lupita Pallás (1926–1985), Mexican actress and dancer
- Lupita Tovar (1910–2016), Mexican actress

== Other uses ==
- La Lupita, Mexican Latin rock band
- Lupita dolls, traditional dolls in Mexico
- Miss Lupita project, project based in Mexico City

== See also ==
- Guadalupe (disambiguation)
- Lupe (disambiguation)
