= Tepeyac =

Hill and Catholic shrine in northern Mexico City

Coordinates: 19.4905°N 99.114°W

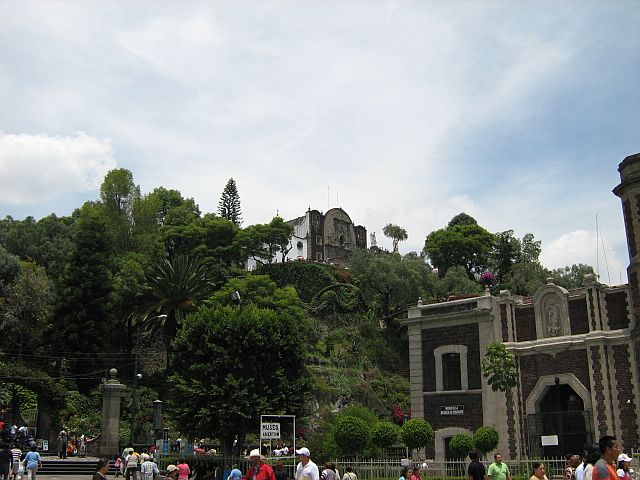
A view of Tepeyac Hill

Tepeyac or the Hill of Tepeyac, historically known by the names Tepeyacac and Tepeaquilla, is located inside Gustavo A. Madero, the northernmost Alcaldía or borough of Mexico City. According to the Catholic tradition, it is the site where Saint Juan Diego met the Virgin of Guadalupe in December 1531, and received the iconic image of the Lady of Guadalupe. The Basilica of Our Lady of Guadalupe located there is one of the most visited Catholic shrines in the world. Spanish colonists erected a Catholic chapel at the site, Our Lady of Guadalupe, "the place of many miracles." It forms part of the Sierra de Guadalupe mountain range.

== Pre-Columbian history ==
Tepeyac Hill "had been a place for worshipping Aztec earth goddesses." Tepeyac is believed to have been a Pre-Columbian worship site for the indigenous mother goddess Tonantzin Coatlaxopeuh ("Tonantzin" is a title of the greatest respect and "Coatlaxopeuh" is a name).

== Etymology ==
In Nahuatl, Tepeyacac is a proper noun, a combination of tepetl ("mountain"), yacatl ("nose"), and the relational word -c, ("at"). According to scholars of the Nahuatl language, "the term would generally be expected to mean 'a settlement on the ridge or brow of a hill.' Since yacatl (the nose going first) often implies antecedence, here the word may refer to the fact that the hill is the first and most prominent of a series of three."

== See also ==
- Basilica of Our Lady of Guadalupe
- El Tepeyac National Park
