= Lupe =

Lupe is a given name, short for Guadalupe, and may refer to:

== People ==
- Lupe Aquino (born 1963), Mexican boxer
- Lupe Fiasco (born 1982), American hip hop artist
- Lupe Ontiveros (1942–2012), Mexican-American film and television actress
- Lupe Pintor (born 1955), Mexican boxer
- Lupe Sanchez (1961–2025), American football player
- Lupe Vélez (1908–1944), Mexican-American actress
- Lupe (Arrested Development), a fictional character from the television series Arrested Development
- Lupe, a fictional character from the television series Fanboy & Chum Chum

== Other uses ==
- Lupé, a commune in the Loire department, France
- Lupe (horse), a racehorse
- Pacific imperial pigeon, a pigeon found in Polynesia.
- SAR-Lupe, a German military reconnaissance satellite system

== See also ==
- Lope (disambiguation)
- Lopez
- Guadalupe (disambiguation)
