= Joaquín Fuero =

Mexican soldier and author

- Born: August 21, 1814; Villa de Guadalupe, New Spain (now Mexico)
- Died: April 21, 1861 (aged 46); Mexico City, Mexico
- Cause of death: Complications from war wound (softening of the brain)
- Education: Military College of Segovia
- Military career
- Allegiance: Mexico
- Branch: Mexican Army
- Rank: Colonel
- Commands: Companies of regular troops, Army of Operations in Tamaulipas (Chief of Staff)
- Known for: Fighting in the Mexican-American War, suppressing the 1840 revolt, author of "Manual del Militar"
- Battles: Battle of Padierna (Mexican-American War)

Joaquín Fuero (21 August 1814 Villa de Guadalupe – 21 April 1861 Mexico City) was a Mexican soldier and author who fought in the Mexican–American War.

== Biography ==
His father was a lieutenant-colonel in the Spanish army. The son was sent to Mexico City for his primary education, but the family had to leave the country toward the close of 1821, as his father refused to serve the cause of Mexican independence. Young Fuero entered the military college of Segovia, and on leaving it entered the army as ensign.

He was promoted to captain for gallantry in 1836, and in 1838 accompanied his father to the island of Cuba, where the latter soon died. Fuero then returned to Mexico, where he entered the army, with the rank of captain, in 1839, was appointed professor in the military college in 1840, and soon established a regular course of practical line-drill, military tactics, and topographical design.

When General Urrea pronounced against the government on 15 July 1840, Fuero attacked him in the citadel at the head of a column of his scholars, and drove him back. He was then given command of several companies of regular troops, with which he aided in suppressing the insurrection, after a fortnight of street fighting.

In 1841 Fuero was promoted major and resigned the vice-presidency of the military college. In 1843 he was appointed chief of staff of the army of operations in Tamaulipas, and as such designed all the plans of the campaign. During the war with the United States, Fuero took part in all the battles, till the defeat at Padierna, after which he protected the retreat of the army at the head of a small force, and received a wound that ultimately caused his death. After the Treaty of Guadalupe Hidalgo he was retired as an invalid on full pay, with the rank of colonel, and opened a private college, but during the latter years of his life he had to abandon this pursuit, as his wound caused a gradual softening of the brain.

== Works ==
Fuero published Manual del Militar, ó Tratado complete de Instrucción en la Ordenanza (2 vols., 1842), and a translation of General McKenna's Treatise on Military Tactics (1844).
