= Valle de Guadalupe (disambiguation) =

Valle de Guadalupe may refer to:

- Valle de Guadalupe, Baja California
- Valle de Guadalupe, Northern Jalisco
- Valle de Guadalupe, Southern Jalisco
- Valle de Guadalupe, Michoacán
- Valle de Guadalupe, Querétaro
