= Boa Esperança Hydroelectric Power Plant =

Boa Esperança Hydroelectric Power Station
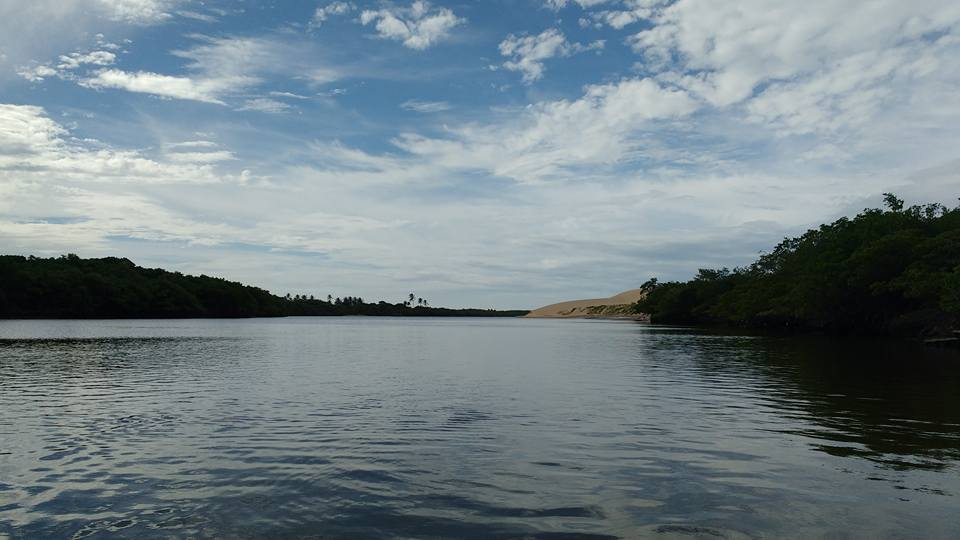
- Interactive map of Boa Esperança Hydroelectric Power Station
- Location: Guadalupe, Piauí, Brazil
- Coordinates: 06°42′21″S 43°44′11″W
- Construction began: 1964
- Opening date: 1970

Dam and spillways
- Impounds: Parnaíba River
- Height: 53 m (174 ft)
- Length: 5,212 m (17,100 ft)
- Spillway capacity: 12,000 m^{3}/s (420,000 cu ft/s)

Reservoir
- Creates: Boa Esperança Reservoir
- Total capacity: 5,100,000,000 m^{3} (4,100,000 acre⋅ft)

Power Station
- Installed capacity: 237.3 MW (318,200 hp)

The Boa Esperança Hydroelectric Power Station (formerly known as Marshal Castelo Branco Hydroelectric Power Station) is a hydroelectric power station in the city of Guadalupe, Piauí in Brazil. It is located on the Parnaíba River.

== See also ==
- List of power stations in Brazil
