= Sierra de Guadalupe =

Sierra de Guadalupe may refer to any of the following:

- Sierra de Guadalupe, Spain, a mountain range in Extremadura also known as Sierra de Villuercas
  - Battle of the Sierra Guadalupe, a battle of the Spanish Civil War
  - Sierra de Guadalupe (Madrid Metro), a station on Line 1
- Sierra de Guadalupe, Texas, a mountain range located in West Texas and southeastern New Mexico
- Sierra de Guadalupe, New Mexico, a mountain range located in Hidalgo County, southwestern New Mexico
- Sierra de Guadalupe, Mexico, a mountain range fringing the northern side of the Valley of Mexico
- Sierra de Guadalupe cave paintings, in Baja California Sur, Mexico

== See also ==
- Guadalupe Mountains
