= Guadalupe District =

Guadalupe District may refer to:

== Peru ==
- Guadalupe District, Pacasmayo, in Pacasmayo province, La Libertad region

== Costa Rica ==
- Guadalupe District, Zarcero, in the canton of Zarcero, Alajuela province
- Guadalupe o Arenilla District, Cartago, in the canton of Cartago, Cartago province
- Guadalupe District, Goicoechea, in the canton of Goicoechea, San José province

== See also ==
- Guadalupe (disambiguation)
