= El Tepeyac National Park =

National park in Mexico

Coordinates: 19°30′11″N 99°6′24″W

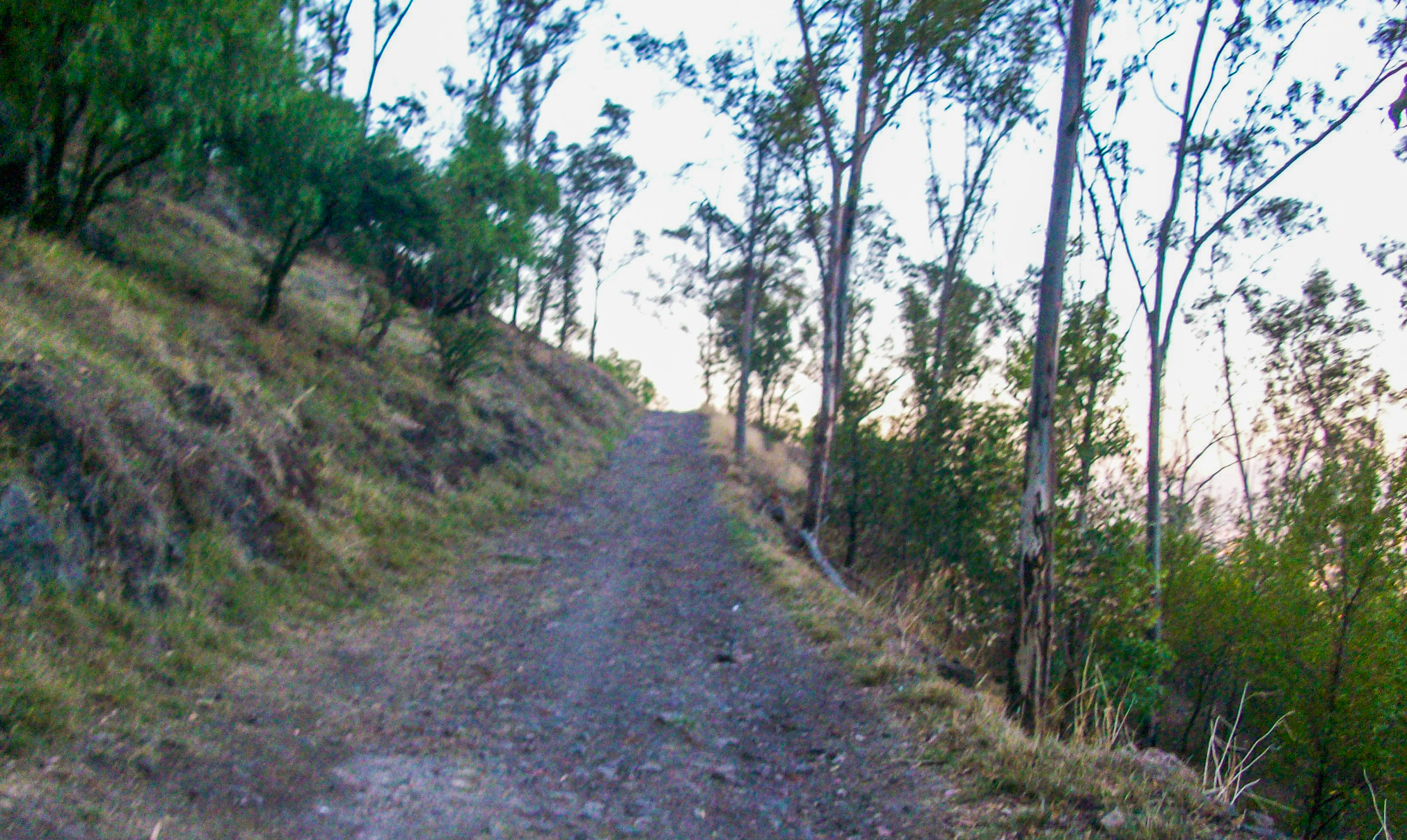
El Tepeyac National Park

El Tepeyac National Park is one of a number of federally recognized national parks in Mexico that are protected natural areas and administered by the federal National Commission of Protected Natural Areas (CONANP), a subsidiary of SEMARNAT (Ministry of Environment). It is one of the few green areas located north of the Mexico City suburbs. 95% of its territory is located in Gustavo A. Madero, D.F. Borough and 5% in the municipality of Tlalnepantla de Baz.

This is one of the large expanses of artificial forest of eucalyptus and was reforested in the first half of the 20th century in the Federal District. The designated territory for the National Park is the Tepeyac Hill, place known for the legend of the apparition of the Virgin of Guadalupe to the indigenous Juan Diego. From the top of the hill a whole view of the Valley of Mexico can be seen. However, this place is threatened by the urban sprawl growing in the surroundings.

This park covers part of the Sierra de Guadalupe mountain range and was created through a decree issued on February 18, 1937. Originally it had an extension of 1,500 ha. Even though several other authors indicate different current numbers depending on the type of topographic study applied. 56% of the park is legally an "ejido" and the 44% left is privately owned.

Because once the territory had a completely lack of vegetation and was restored after reforestation activities, by decrees issued in 1926, 1937 and 1972, El Tepeyac is now considered a protected National Park under reforestation programs of Local and Federal administration.

== Geography and nature ==
The park includes within its territory the Tepeyac Hill, Cerro de Guerrero and the Cerro de Santa Isabel. The territory is shared in the middle by 6 colonias of the Gustavo A. Madero borough that surround it. Their population rises to 33,263 hab. Another 87,604 people live in the surrounding neighborhoods of the same borough.

The main access of the park is still located in Mexico City on Insurgentes avenue, after the town of Santa Isabel Tola. The park is located at the Eastern Sierra de Guadalupe with a low altitude. There are three main elevated areas that are between 2,450 and 2,500 meters above sea level. These elevations are composed mainly of volcanic soil. They are geologically composed of igneous hypabyssal rocks, tuffs and basaltic andesite. The soil of the Park is constituted mainly by eutric regosols (soils on the convergent toe slope, having typical horizontal arrangements), all of them fertile and easily erodible with low retention of moisture. Some areas of the Park are constituted by lithosols and faeozems haplic. It does not have any nearby tributary. Above Lake Texcoco and Lake Zumpango lined hills part. The Aqueduct of Guadalupe, which produced water for the nearby Villa Guadalupe and came with the vital fluid to Tlalnepantla village, was built due to the lack of liquid for human consumption. In general the climate zone is temperate semi-dry type with rains that occur during the summer. There are only temporary torrential runoffs during the wet season and some over-pumping emanations forming small wells of volcanic rock in the Park.

== Flora and fauna ==
The predominant species is eucalyptus, which was planted to reforest this Park and other areas around the Valley of Mexico, thereby creating large tracts of protected forest. Although you it can also be observed some of the following species to a lesser extent: Cedar, oak, radiata pine, pine patula pirules. In some smaller areas there is presence of grasslands.

The fauna of the place is gone, there are just some kind of rats, mouses and some species introduced by people that live or work close to the Park.

== Cultural aspects ==
Since the pre-Hispanic period the reference zone is a ceremonial center of great importance to the Aztec culture in the worship of the goddess Tonatzin and since the Hispanic period in the veneration of the Virgin of Guadalupe. The etymology is Nahuatl, and Zacahuitzco Zacatenco means place of grass and thorns; Vicente Guerrero, also called Atzacualtépetl: on the Hill; door Gachupines, known as Quezahuatitlan: sterile tree.

Early settlers pre-Hispanic the area settled on the slopes of the mountain range of Guadalupe sites today known as Ticoman, Tlatilco and Zacatenco, outside of these sites not found vestiges that indicate the presence of other people, due perhaps to the waters of the Lake reached the slopes of the hills of Tepeyac and Guerrero. A series of excavations in this region on the North of the Mexico City, found human remains in adjoining buildings inhabited; tombs finding also ceramic, clay, stone and obsidian tools figurines objects ornament; simple shapes and with clear Olmec influence. It is not known with precision when started this classic horizon, but it is estimated that it was at the beginning of the Christian era and ends in the ninth century. During this period, Mexico’s Valley is influenced by many cultures, among which are evident with greater significance: the Olmec the Teotihuacana, the Cholulteca, the Toltec, Chichimeca; latter being which predominated in the Serranía de Guadalupe.

== Services ==
Among others, El Tepeyac lodges administrative offices, an open refuge, sanitary services, a small chapel on top of the Gachupines Hill, a concreted road of 1.3 km, a small pond, storeroom, benches and tables, an out of service greenhouse and a children playground.

=== Recreational activities ===
Most visitors like going to the park in the mornings to take a walk. Camping is also popular during weekends. There is also a kids playground as part of the facilities of the park as well as soccer courts so that visitants can enjoy a soccer match. Picnics are also a common activity that the local population tend to perform inside the park.

== Problems ==
The park has several security issues. There is vandalism occurring and constant attacks to visitors due to the lack of surveillance in the park. In consequence, only about 70 people attend the park on Sundays.

There is also a high level of contamination due to waste accumulation and forest fires. The fires have made it a giant dump for the inhabitants from the nearby colonies. National Park Tepeyac, has served in recent years as a dump of gravel for underground works. There is currently a government authorization to deposit 60,000 cubic meters of trash in the park. The director of the Mexican Institute of Renewable Natural Resources, Enrique Beltran, stated that the waste deposited in "Parque del Tepeyac" constitutes a source of infection for inhabitants of the nearby area. The infections are originated because of the precipitations that have caused black waters to disseminate and contaminate neighbor colonies. There are other sources of pollution like solid waste (garbage) in different areas of the park. The green area suffers from removal and destruction of natural resources such as the collection of snails, insects, bird hunting, quarrying, fodder, roots and damage to its vegetation due to excessive logging and lack of flora and fauna care.

As consequence of the lack of security and service employees, the park faces continuous uncontrolled access of visitors as well as lack of appropriate signing to indicate directions both externally and within the park area. The facilities are insufficient and in devastating conditions. Theoretically the park should have 1.500 hectares, but in reality there are only 650 because there are about six thousand illegally sold houses in the 850 hectares left. This Park serves as a natural barrier to erosion and also helps Mexico City with oxygen and weather stability.

== Basílica de Santa María de Guadalupe ==
Parque Nacional El Tepeyac shares part of the hills of Santa Isabel and Guerrero with the Basilica of Guadalupe. El Tepeyac is famous for being, according to the Catholic faith, the site where the Virgin of Guadalupe appeared to Juan Diego Cuauhtlatoatzin the first Latin American indigenous who witnessed the apparition of the Virgin of Guadalupe in 1531. Currently at the foot of the hills of Santa Isabel and Guerrero is the Basilica of Guadalupe (the monumental complex dedicated to Virgin Guadalupe), which every year receives millions of pilgrims, especially on December 12. It is considered the main American Catholic religious meeting point and one of the most visited in the world with annually twenty million visitors.

The Basilica of Guadalupe is formed by a compound called Plaza Mariana composed of several churches and buildings. Forming the Basilica there are several chapels such as Capilla el Pocito, Parroquia de Capuchinas, Capilla del Cerrito and Capilla de Indios. It also has among their facilities an investigation center which includes an historical collection of Colonial Mexico documents mainly divided into three branches: Claveria, Parroquia and Secretaria Privada. It also holds music files with over 131 Mexican authors, 77 Italians, 23 Spanish and from other nationalities. Lorenzo Boturinis’ Theological Library is also inside the facilities and it includes more than 17 000 titles.

Another important part of the compound is the museum that opened in 1941 and holds an important art collection of 1500 Colonial Mexico pieces including paintings, sculptures, jewellery and more. It also has works from the most important painters of New Spain such as Cristobal de Villalpando and Miguel Cabrera. The halls are dedicated to the Virgin of Guadalupe and serve as temporary exhibition spaces.

== See also ==
- List of national parks of Mexico
