= Sierra de Guadalupe, Mexico =

Mountain range along Central Mexico

Sierra de Guadalupe
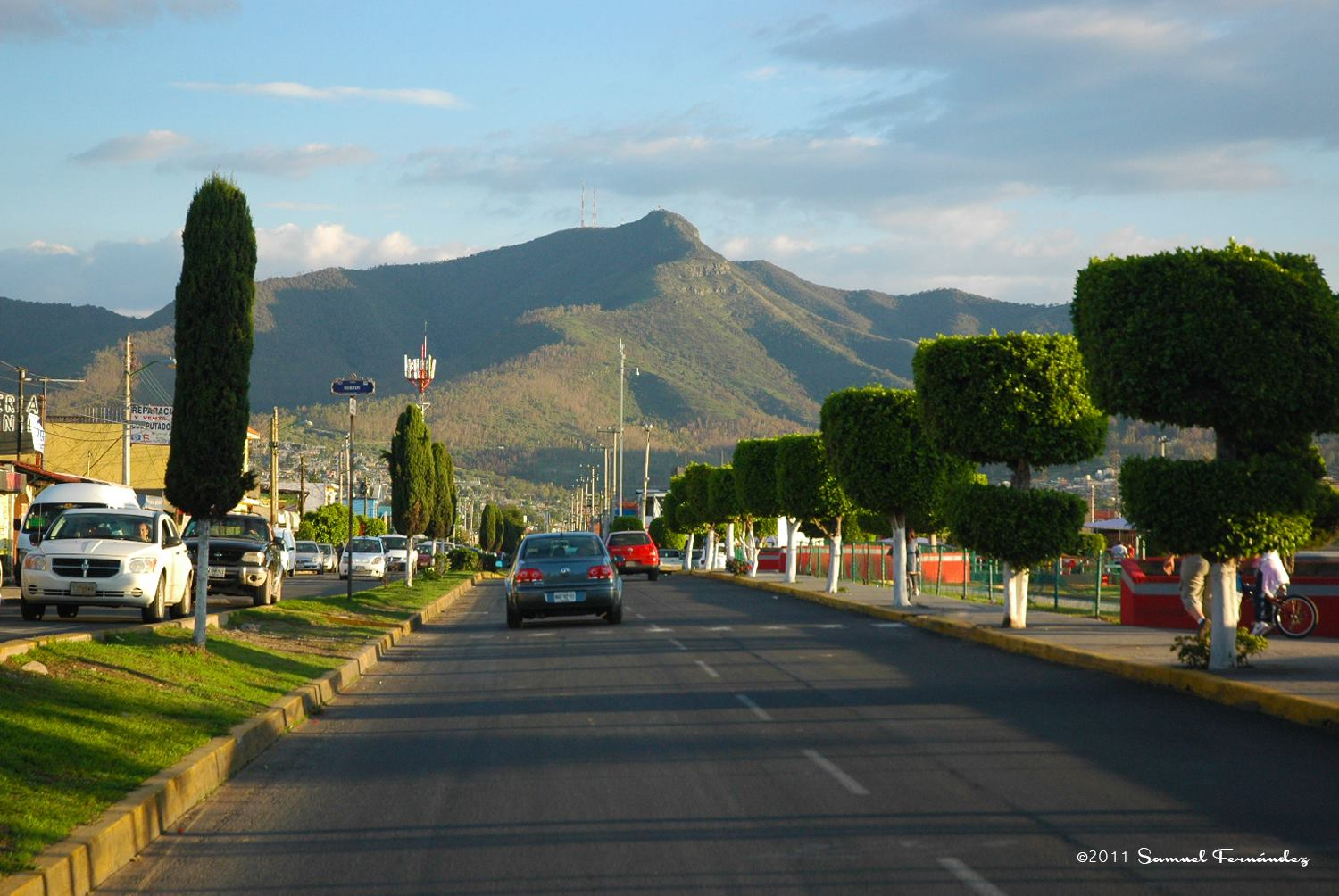
- Highest point as seen from Coacalco

Highest point
- Peak: Picacho Moctezuma
- Elevation: 3,055 m (10,023 ft)
- Coordinates: 19°34′59″N 99°07′01″W

Dimensions
- Length: 25 km (16 mi) W x E
- Width: 8 km (5.0 mi) N × S

Geography
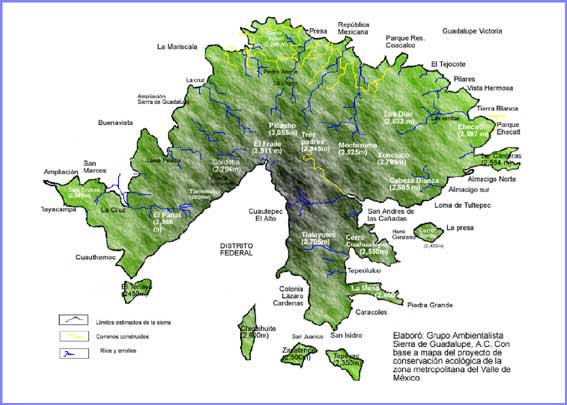
- Country: Mexico
- State(s): State of Mexico; Mexico City
- Region: Central Mexico

Geology
- Volcanic belt: Trans-Mexican Volcanic Belt

The Sierra de Guadalupe is a mountain range in Mexico. It is found between the borough of Gustavo A. Madero in northern Mexico City and the municipalities of Cuautitlán Izcalli, Tultitlán, Coacalco, Ecatepec and Tlalnepantla, in the State of Mexico. Its highest peak is at 3,055 meters (10,023 ft).

== History ==
Lake Texcoco in 1519. The sierra is located to the northwest

There is evidence that the Aztecs worshipped Tonantzin (Goddess of Sustenance) at Tepeyac hill. The sierra is named after Our Lady of Guadalupe, a Marian apparition that, according to oral and written colonial sources such as the Huei tlamahuiçoltica, Juan Diego saw at the Tepeyac hill.

In 1937, the El Tepeyac National Park was created in the Tepeyac hill, in the eastern portion of the sierra, by decree of the president Lázaro Cárdenas.

== Geology ==
The sierra is a dormant volcano that is part of the Trans-Mexican Volcanic Belt. The basement is made of andesitic and dacitic soil. The last volcanic activity in the area occurred 14 to 15 million years ago.

== Ecology ==
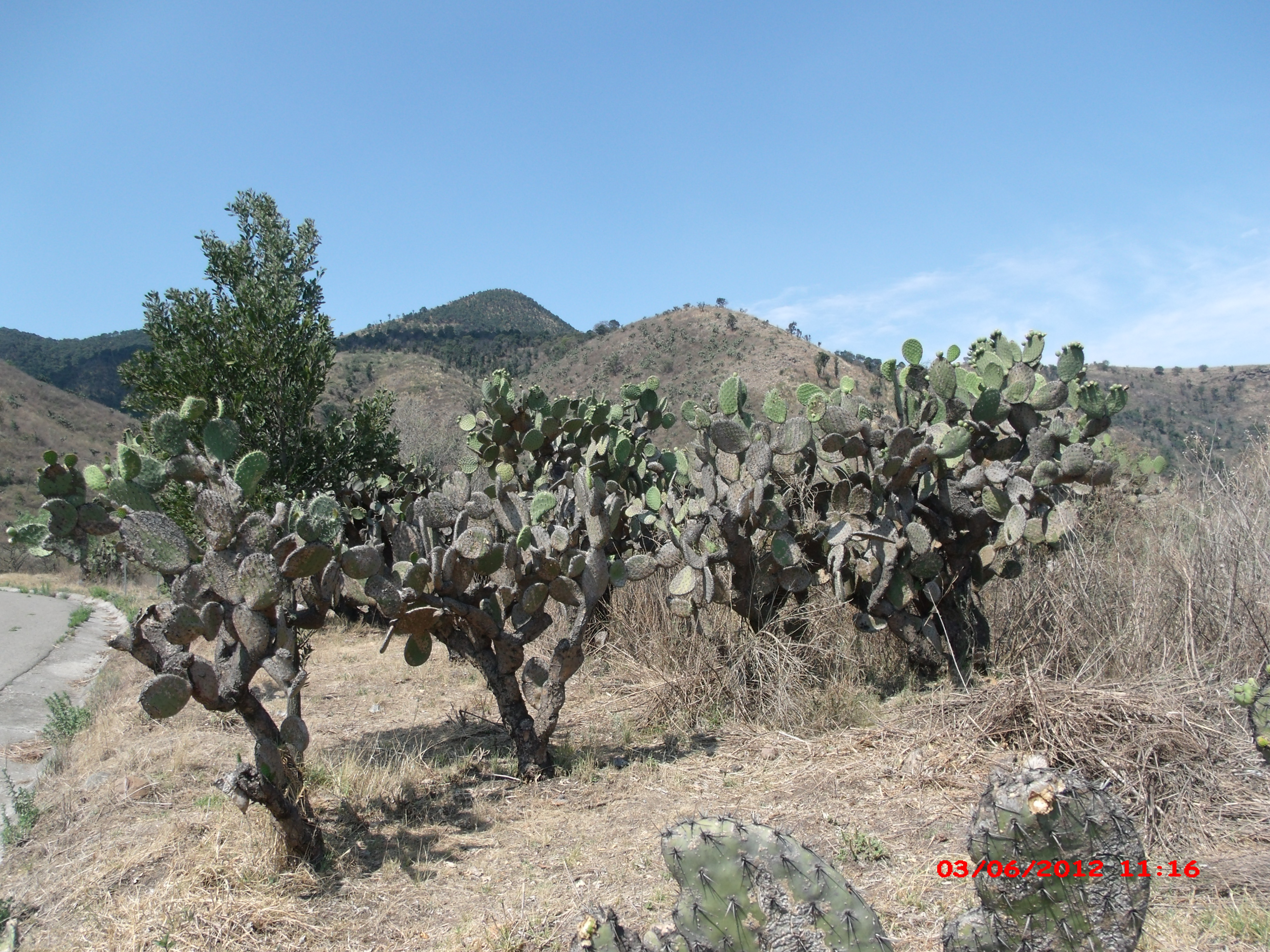
Cactaceae in the sierra

=== Climate ===
The sierra has a humid subtropical climate. It rains mostly during summers with rainfall of between 700 and 800 mm (2.5 and 3.5 in) per year. The temperature ranges from 12 to 16 °C (53 to 60 °F).

=== Fauna ===
Among the species found in the sierra, it is included the Mexican pine snake, the American kestrel, the roadrunner, the opossum, and the bobcat. Introduced species include the white-tailed deer, tapirs and bisons.

=== Flora ===
In the area, quercus trees and xerophile plants are abundant.

=== Preservation ===
The area has suffered from environmental deterioration due to deforestation. Part of the eastern part of the sierra was reforested with the introduction of eucalyptus, pinus, cedrus and casuarina trees.

== Hills ==
It is composed of the following hills:

- Cerro del Sombrero or Pico Tres Padres
- Cerro de los Gachupines (2,330 m [7,640 ft])
- Cerro del Chiquihuite (2,730 m [8,960 ft])
- Cerro del Picacho Moctezuma (3,055 m [10,023 ft])
- Cerro del Picacho El Fraile (2,902 m [9,521 ft])
- Cerro del Picacho El Jaral
- Cerro del Tenayo
- Cerro Petlecatl
- Cerro de la Calavera
- Cerro Gordo
- Cerro Zacatenco (2,500 m [8,200 ft])
- Cerro del Guerrero (2,440 m [8,010 ft])
- Cerro de Santa Isabel
- Cerro del Tepeyac (2,270 m [7,450 ft])

=== Gallery ===
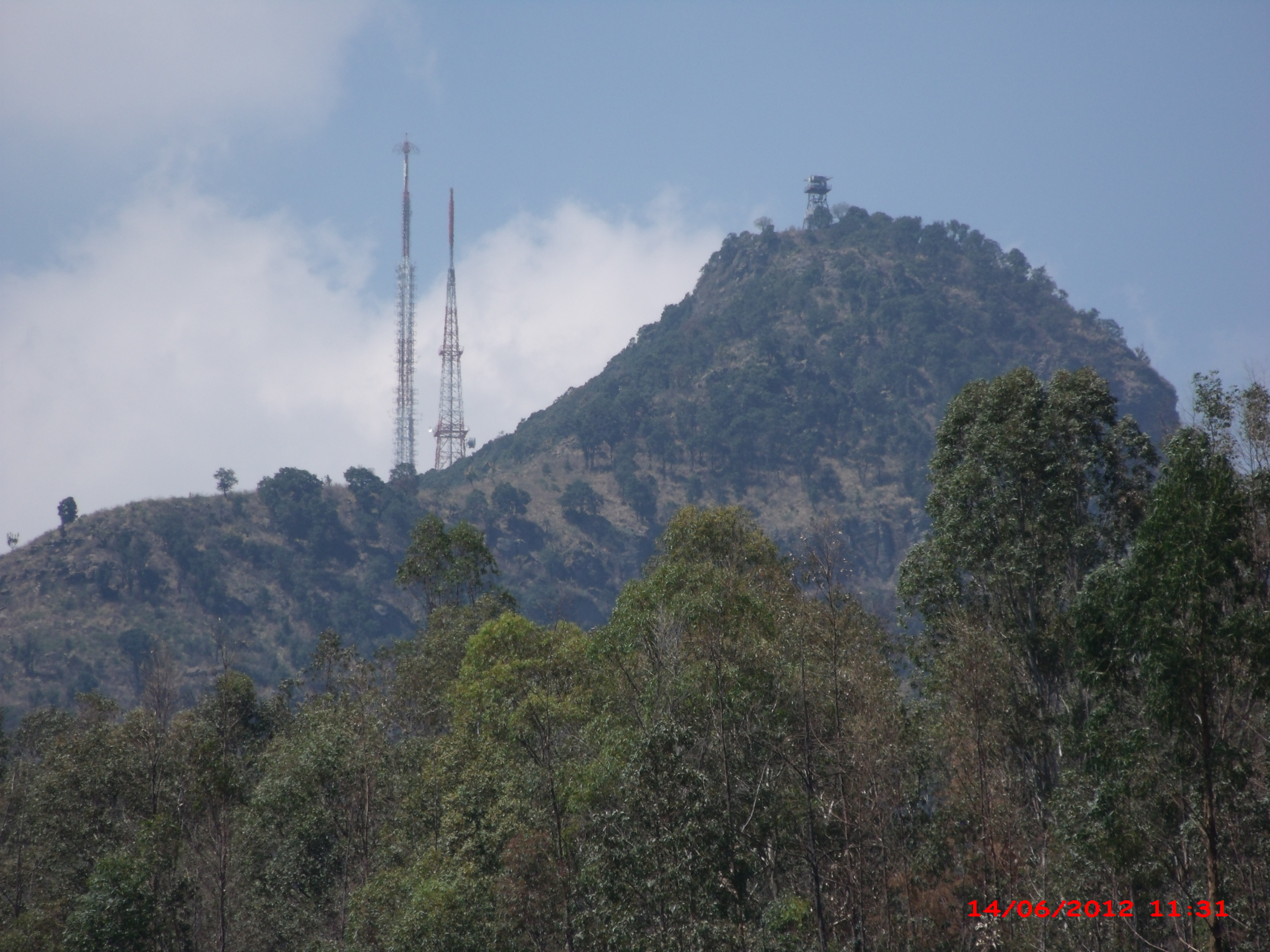
Cerro Picacho Moctezuma

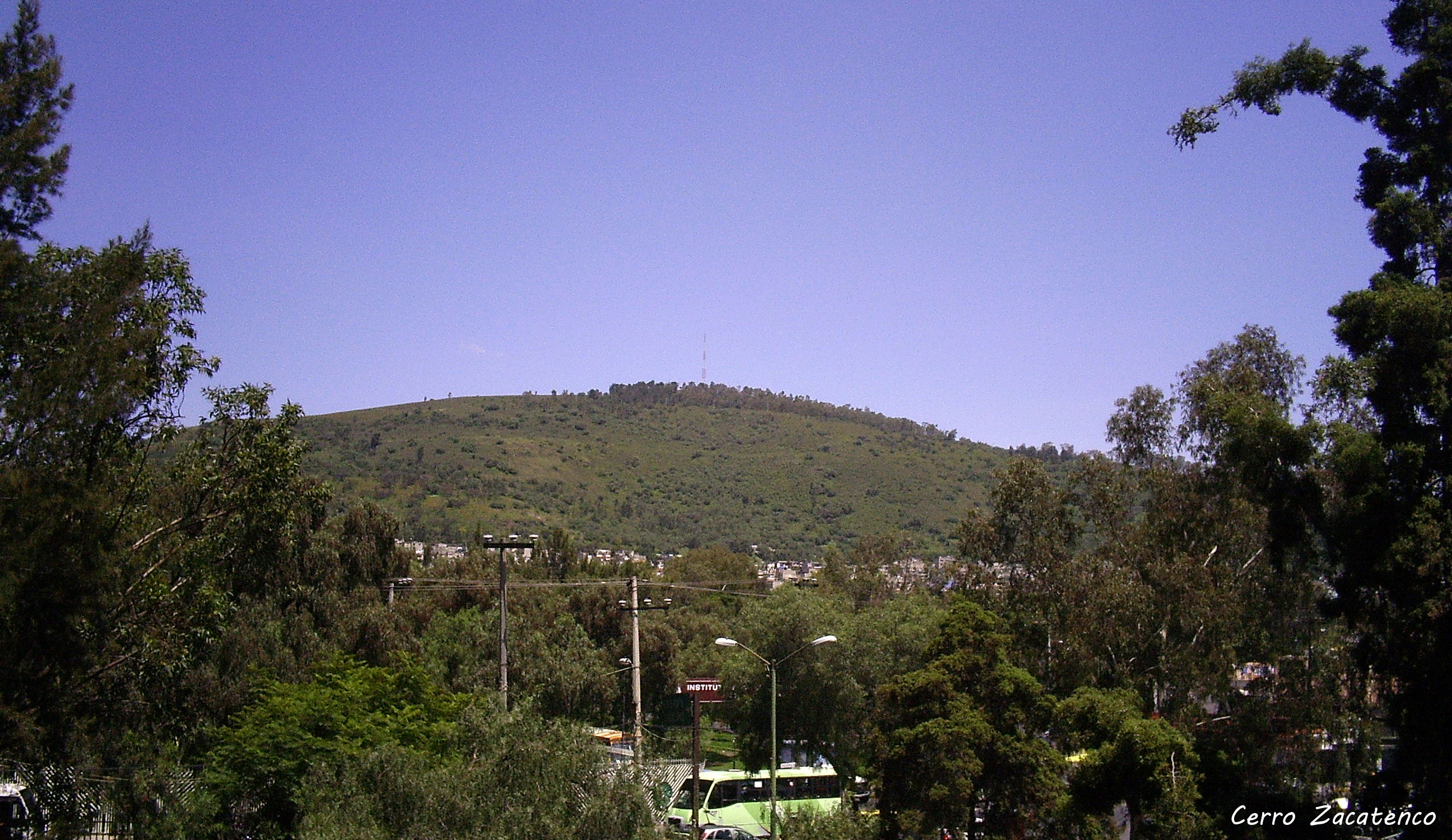
Cerro Zacatenco

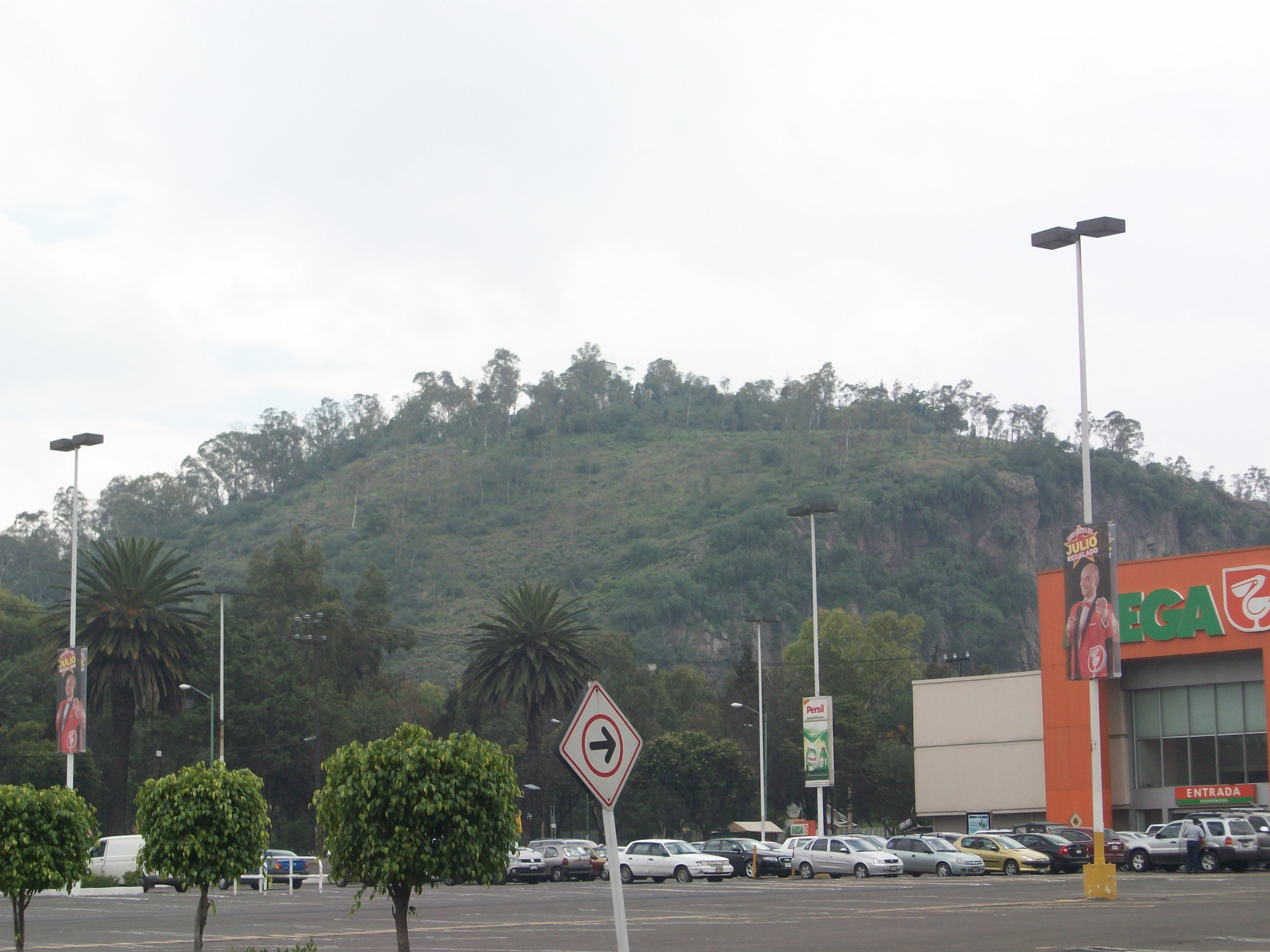
Cerro Los Gachupines

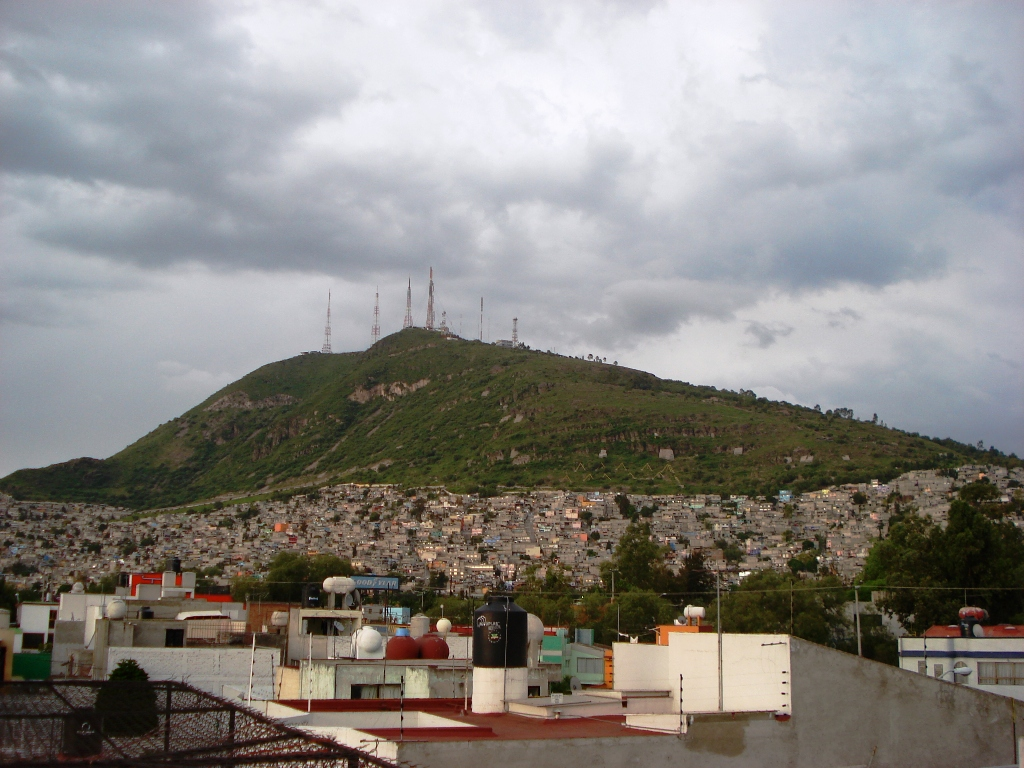
Cerro del Chiquihuite

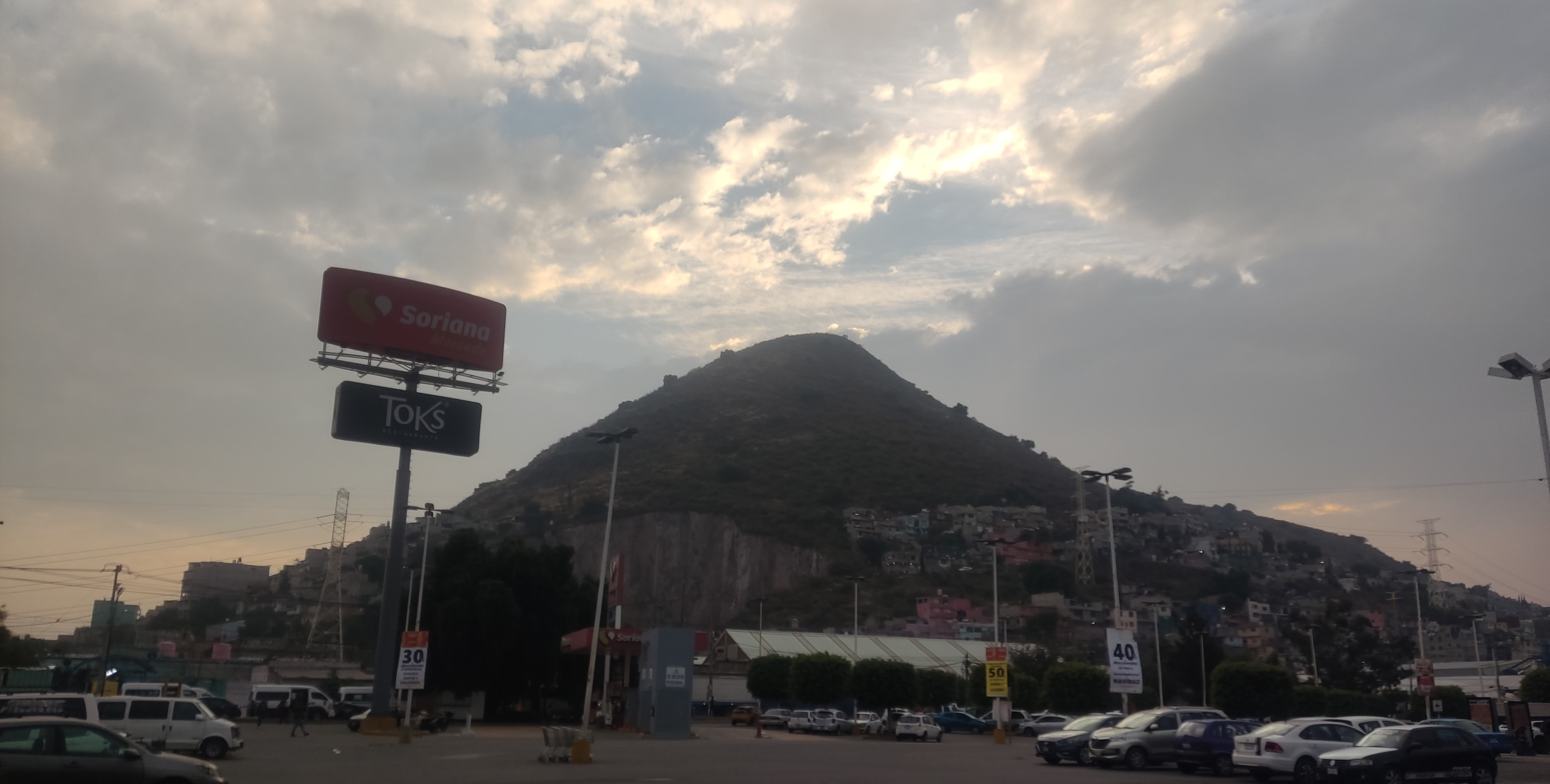
Cerro Gordo

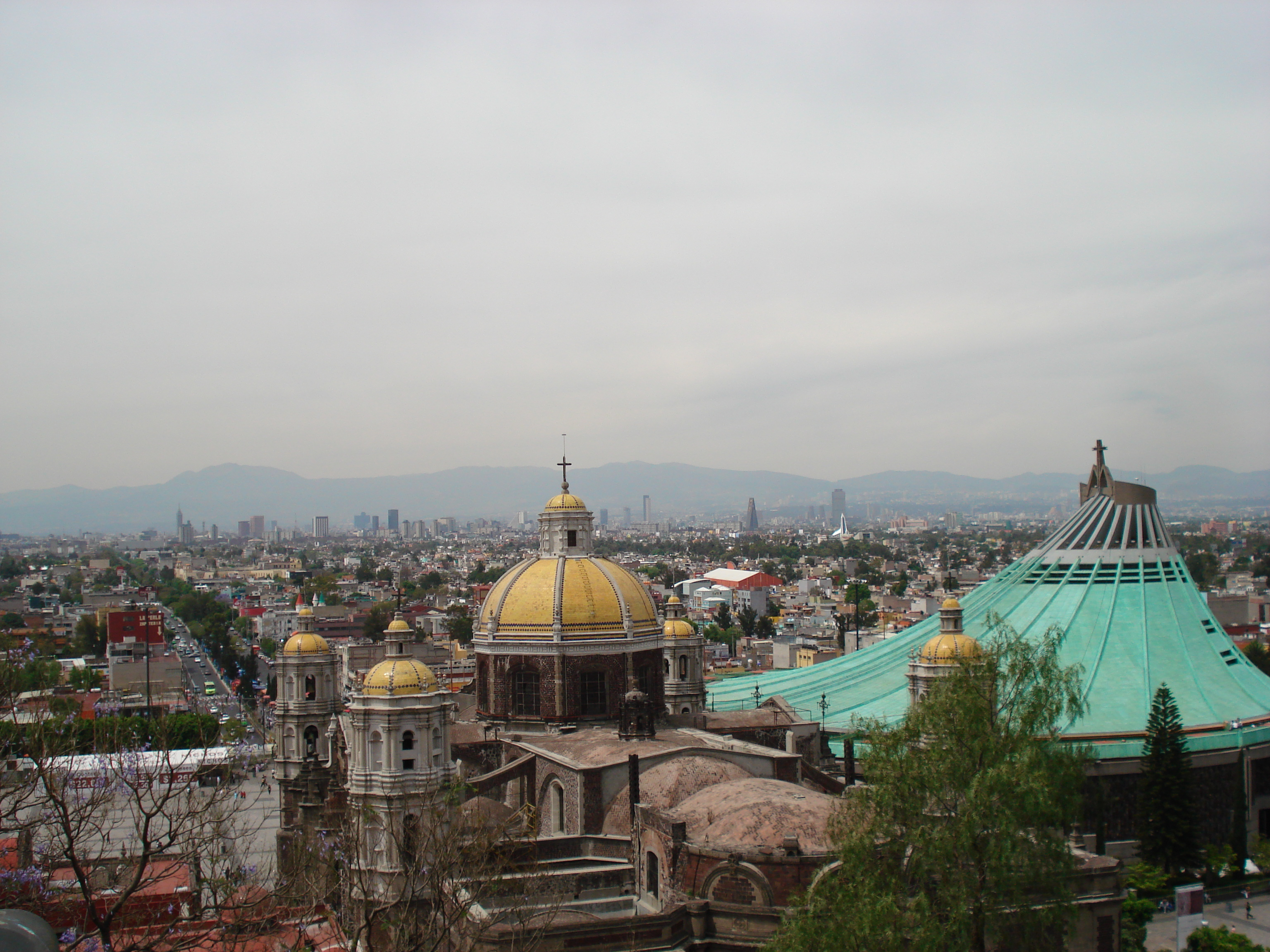
The Basilica of Our Lady of Guadalupe is located at the Cerro del Tepeyac

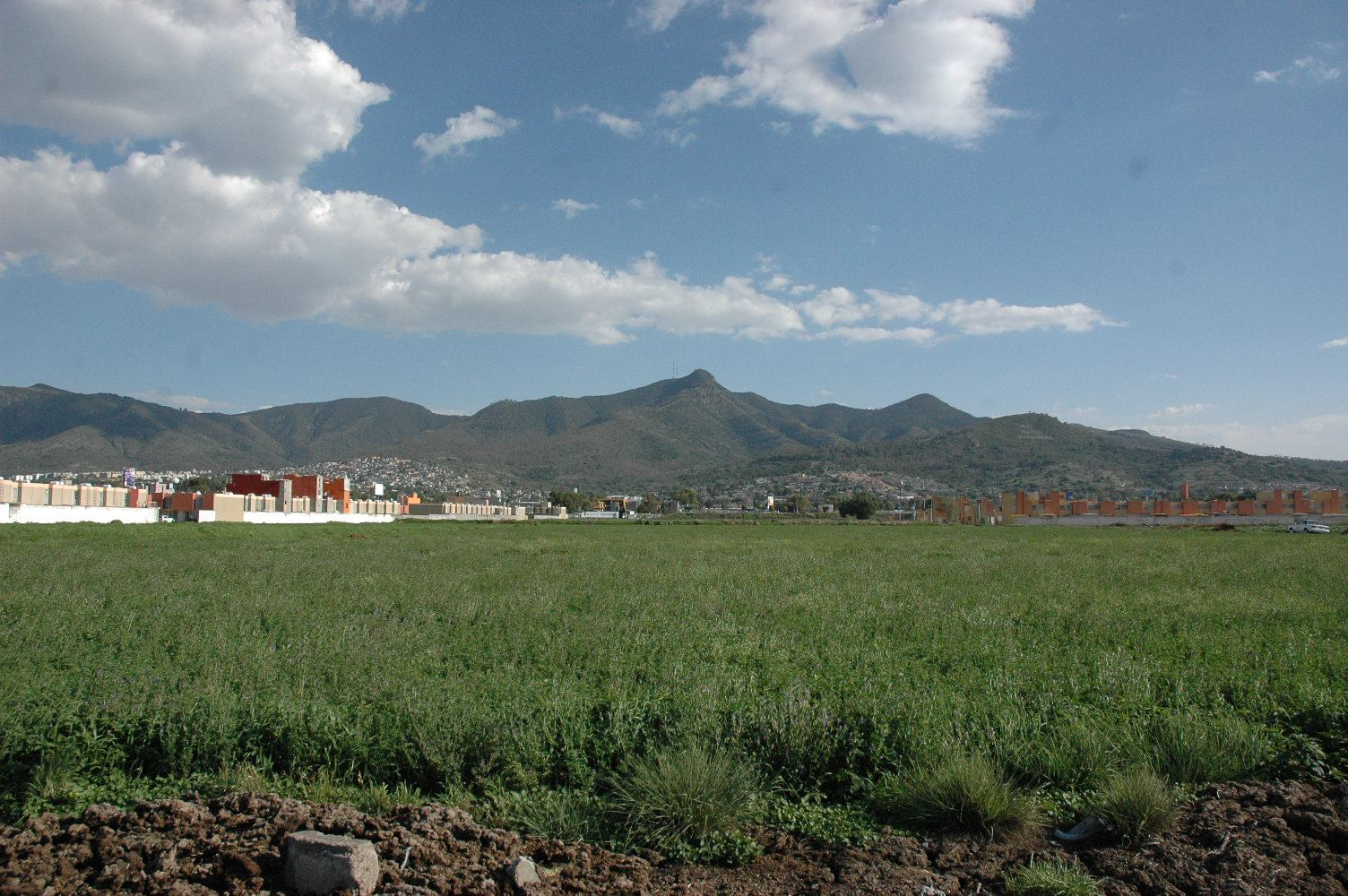
Wider view

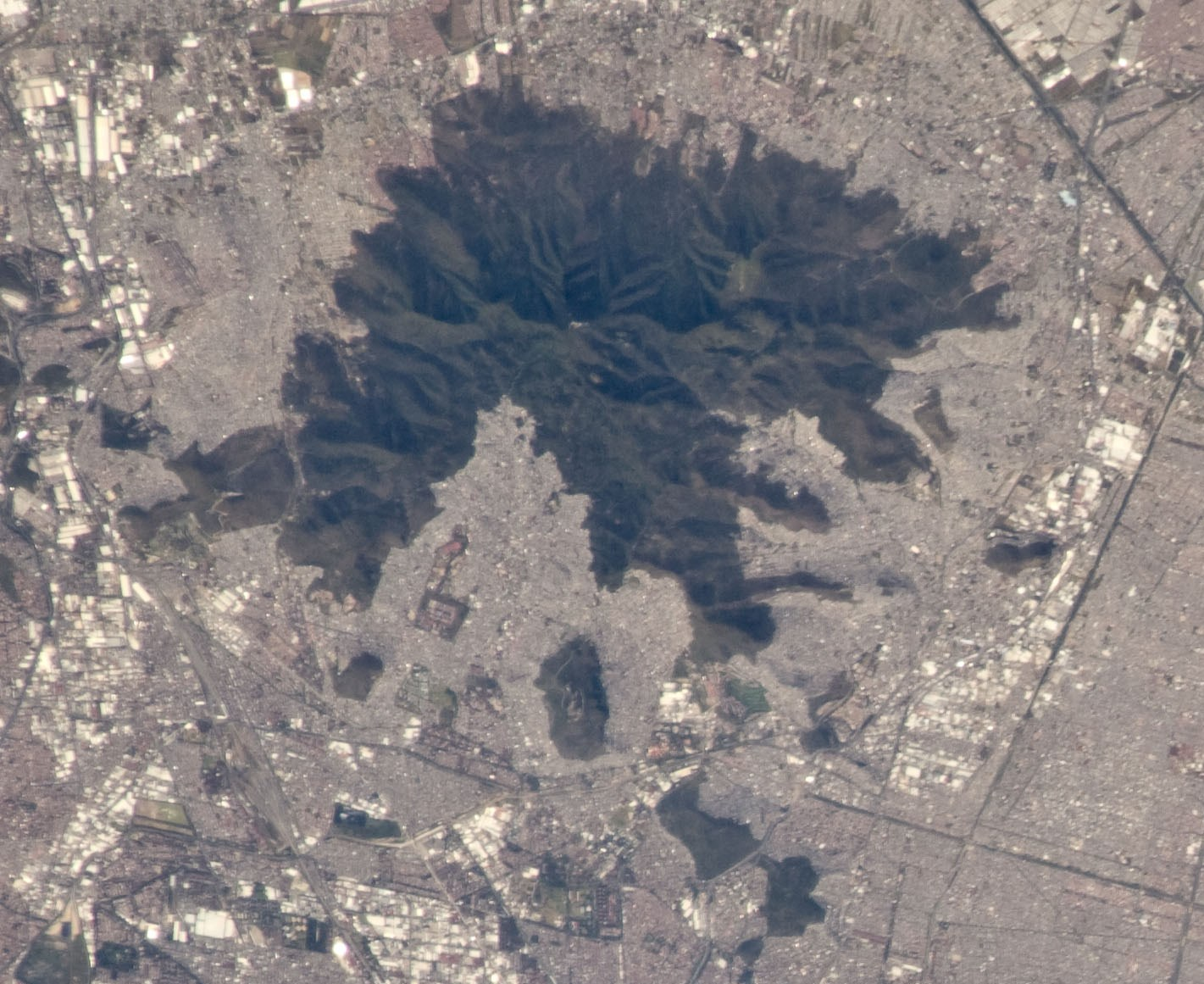
Satellite view
