= Tonantzin =

Aztec goddess

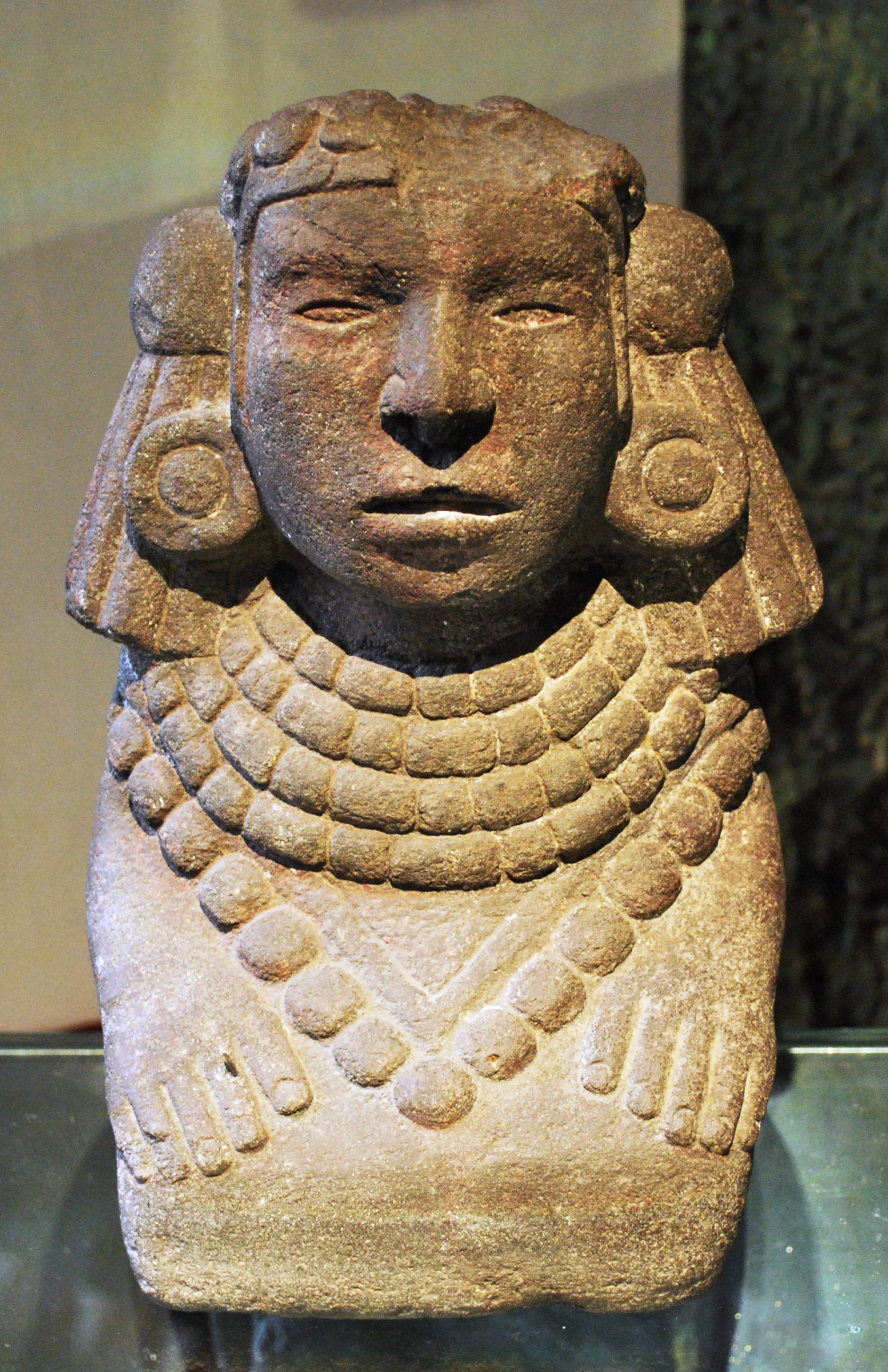
Stone figure of Tonatzin found at the Museo Nacional de las Intervenciones, Mexico City

Tonantzin (Classical Nahuatl: Tonāntzin [toˈnáːn.tsin]) is a Nahuatl title composed of to- "our" + nān "mother" + -tzin "(honorific suffix)". When addressing Tonantzin directly, men use the suffixed vocative form Tonāntziné [toˌnaːntsinˈé], and women use the unsuffixed vocative form Tonāntzín [tonaːnˈtsín].

== Aspects ==
Such Goddesses as "Mother Earth", the "Goddess of Sustenance", "Honored Grandmother", "Snake", "Bringer of Maize" and "Mother of Corn" can all be called Tonantzin, as it is an honorific title comparable to "Our Lady" or "Our Great Mother". Other indigenous (Nahuatl) names include Chicōmexōchitl [tʃikˌoːmeˈʃóːtʃitɬ] (literally "Seven Flower") and Chālchiuhcihuātl [ˌtʃaːɬtʃiʍˈsíwaːtɬ] (literally "Emerald/Jade Woman"). A "Tonāntzin" was honored during the movable feast of Xōchilhuitl [ʃoːˈtʃíɬwitɬ].

Some have claimed that upon the apparition of Our Lady of Guadalupe in the hill of Tepeyac where Tonantzin's temple had been destroyed by the Spanish priests, the natives recognized Our Lady of Guadalupe as Tonantzin Coatlaxopeuh (Meaning "Our Lady" who emerges from the region of light like the Eagle from fire).

== Alleged syncretism ==
Mexico City's 17th-century Basilica of Guadalupe—built in honor of the Blessed Virgin and perhaps Mexico's most important religious building—was constructed at the base of the hill of Tepeyac. 16th century Franciscan friar Bernardino de Sahagún wrote in his Florentine Codex that Indians traveled to Tepeyac to worship Tonantzin. In her book Goddesses and the Divine Feminine: A Western Religious History, Rosemary Radford Ruether wrote:

"Sahagún’s protests have been understood in modern times to mean that an Aztec Goddess named Tonantzin had a temple on the hill of Tepeyac, but this has been questioned. Tonantzin was a title for the maternal aspect of any Aztec goddess, not the name of a particular goddess. When it was used as a title for Mary, the maternal aspect of the Aztec Goddess could be read into the Spanish Marian cult by Nahua Christians. This seems to be what happened, rather than the cult of Guadalupe intentionally replacing an earlier temple or cult of an Aztec Mother Goddess at this particular site.”

It has been asserted that the word Guadalupe in this appellation may derive from Coatlaxopeuh, meaning "the one who crushes the serpent", and perhaps referring to Quetzalcoatl. The name really came about because the Spanish remembered the Virgin of Guadalupe in Extremadura, Spain, and they realized that by giving this apparition the same name as the one from their homeland, the etymological slippage between their term and the Nahuatl term would further contribute toward their project of conquest through cultural colonization. Of note here is the historical fact that La Virgen de Guadalupe is of tremendous significance in Mexico, reflecting a pre-Columbian understanding on the part of colonized people that Guadalupe must be understood in relation to Coatlaxopeuh, despite ongoing effort by colonizing forces to erase this historical context.

Likewise José de Villerías y Roelas says she was the daughter of Pluto and Proserpina

In her book, Borderlands/La Frontera: The New Mestiza, Gloria E. Anzaldúa notes that "lopeuh" is a Nahuatl word meaning "the one who is at one with the beasts", and "coatl" is the Nahuatl word for serpent. In the story of the virgin's apparition to Juan Diego, Guadalupe tells Juan Diego that her name is "María Coatlalopeuh". Anzaldúa suggests this name equates to "the one who is at one with the beasts".

== Modern usage ==
Tonantzin is sometimes used as a female given name; Native Californian actress Tonantzin Carmelo is an example. Tona, Tonzi, Toni, Nantzin, and Nancy are possible nicknames.

Tonantzín (spelled with an accent on the final syllable) plays an inspirational role in the Sandra Cisneros short story "Little Miracles, Kept Promises", from her collection Woman Hollering Creek and Other Stories (1991). The story includes Cisneros's portrait of the artist as a young Chicana.

In the comic series Love and Rockets by Gilbert Hernandez and Jaime Hernandez, Tonantzin is the name of a central character in Gilbert's world of Palomar. The character is often linked to the Aztec goddess.
