= Valle de Guadalupe, Michoacán =

Coordinates: 19°54′N 102°07′W

Valle de Guadalupe is a village in Michoacán, Mexico.

Traditionally, they celebrate the fiesta of Virgen de Guadalupe on the second Saturday of the month of January.

The lake of Camecuaro is nearby.
