= Guadalupe, Santander =

Coordinates: 6.247°N 73.418°W

Guadalupe, Santander (Colombia)
- Municipality and town
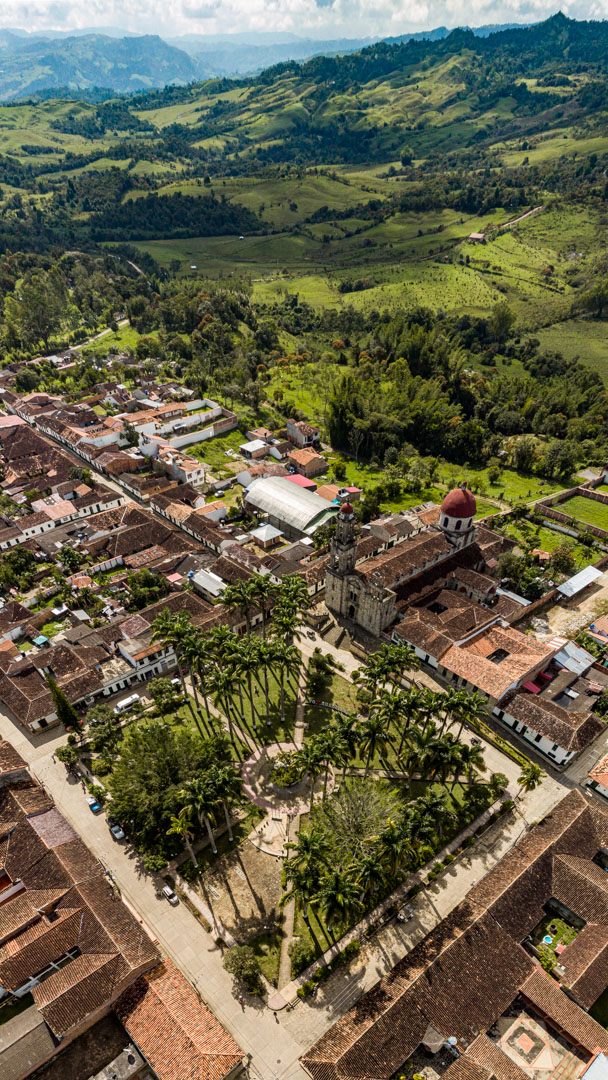
- Vista Guadalupe, Santander, Colombia

- Flag Coat of arms

- Location of the municipality and town of Guadalupe, Santander in the Santander Department of Colombia.
- Country: Colombia
- Department: Santander Department
- Established: 30 March 1715

Area
  - Municipality and town: 15,581 km^{2} (6,016 sq mi)
- Elevation: 1.395 m (4.58 ft)

Population
  - Municipality and town: 5.596 inhabitants
  - Density: 401/km^{2} (1,040/sq mi)
  - Urban: 1.692 inhabitants
- Time zone: UTC-5 (Colombia Standard Time)

Guadalupe is a town and municipality in the Santander Department in northeastern Colombia. It was founded in 1715 by the family Camacho Sabidos, in the lead of the Spanish Captain José Camacho Sabidos and management of Don Juan de Herrera and Tovar, according to church records of the year 1713.

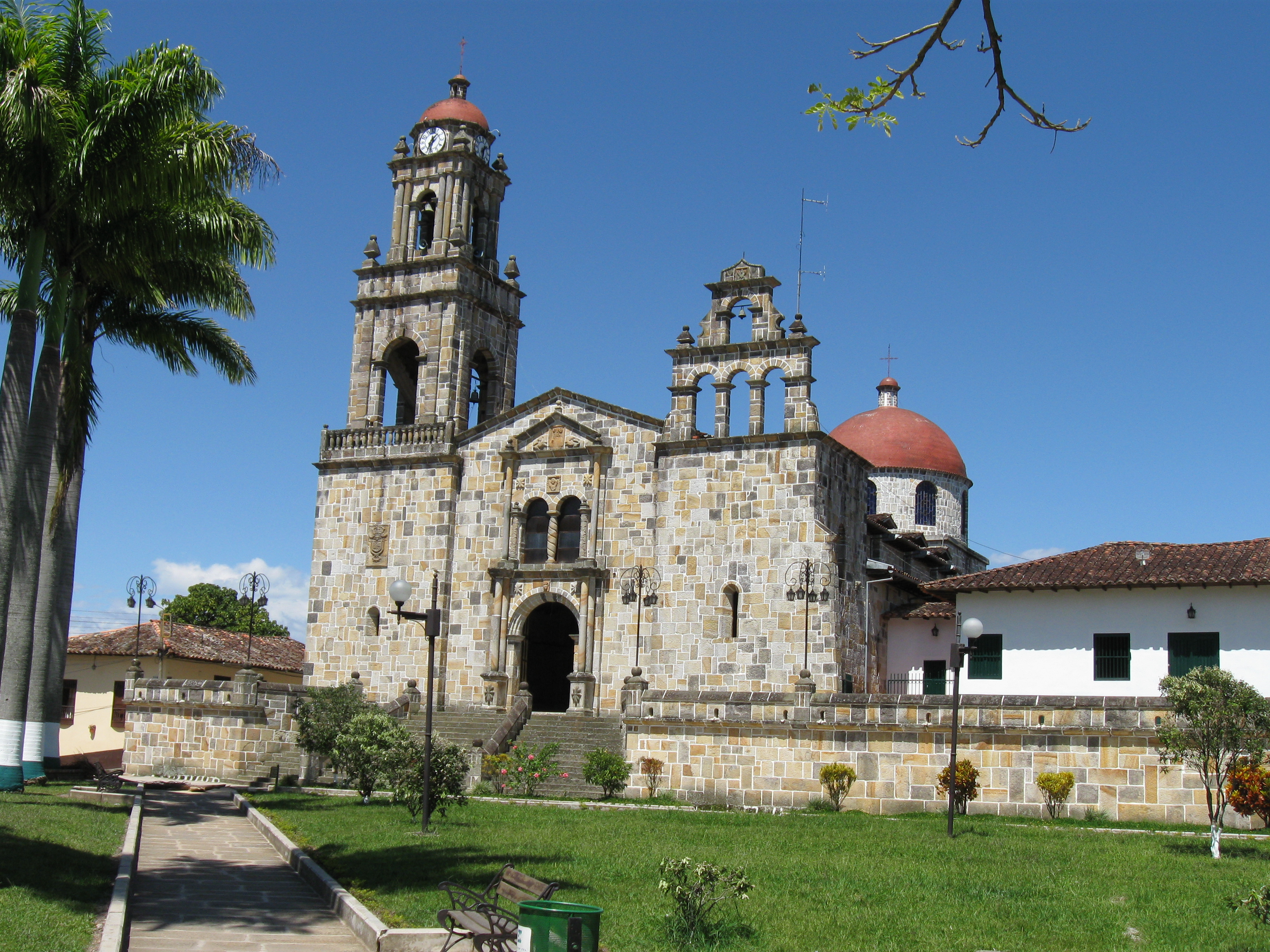
Iglesia principal -main church- Guadalupe, Santander

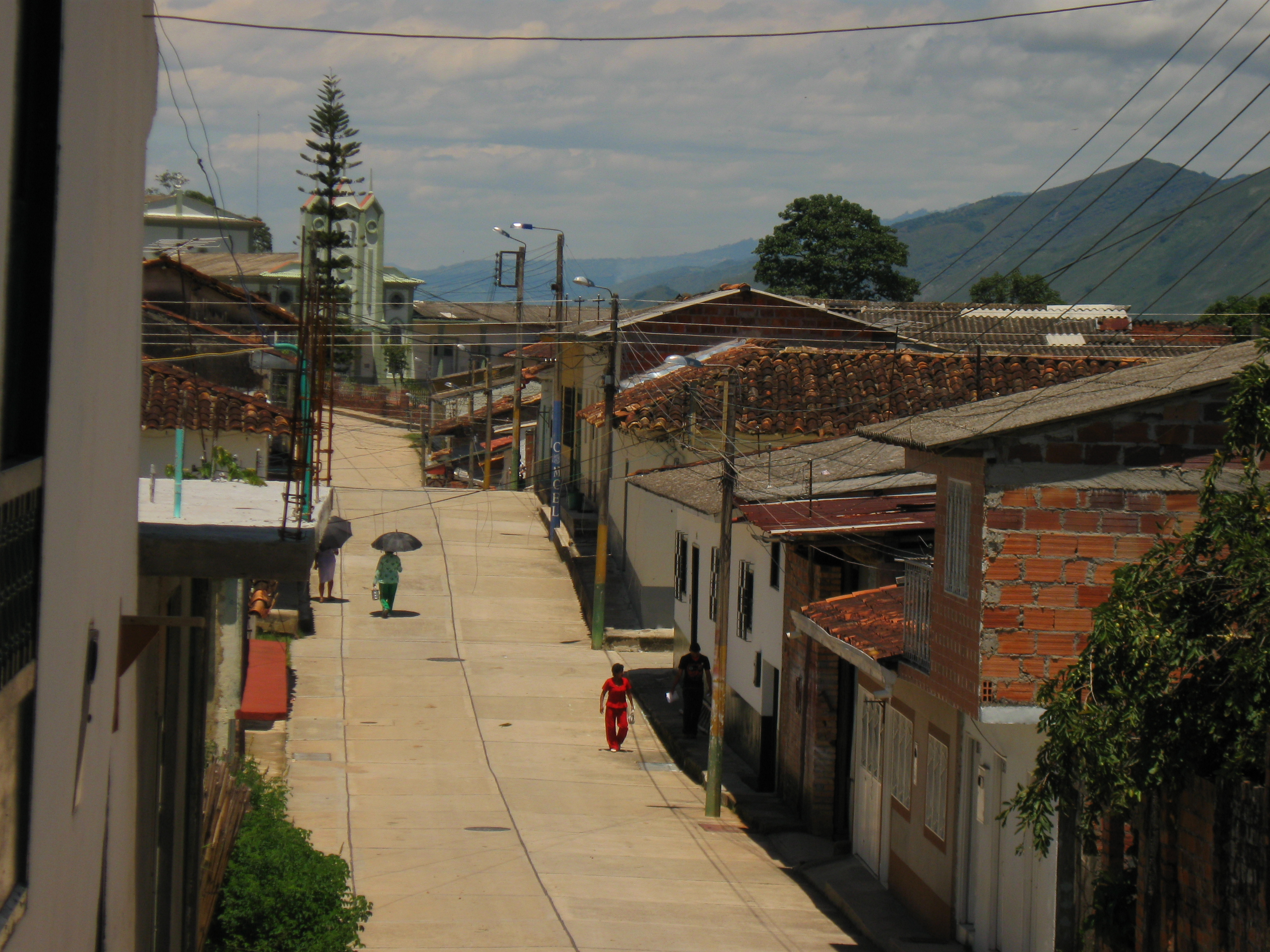
Guadalupe, Santander

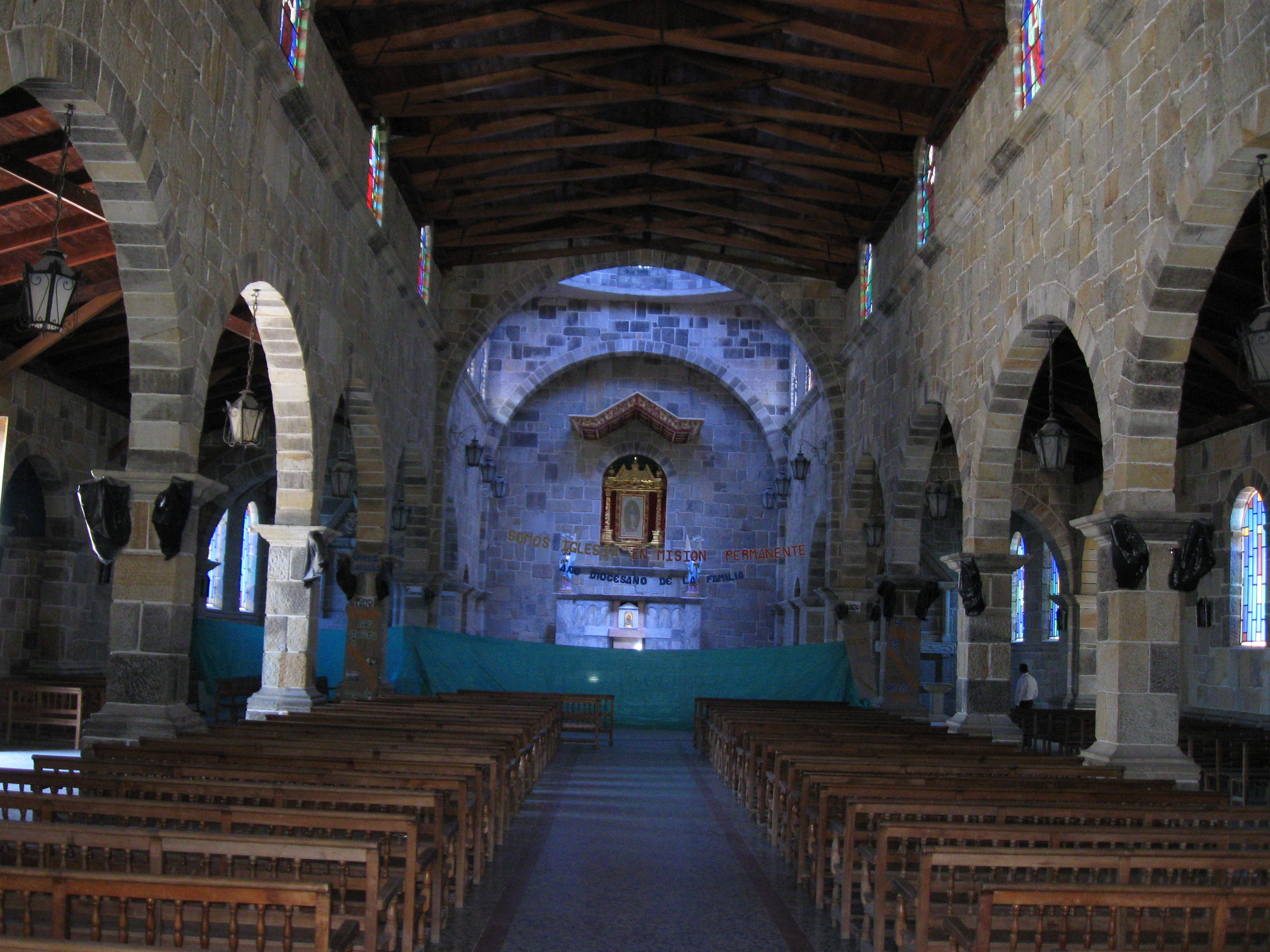
Interior Iglesia Principal, Guadalupe, Santander

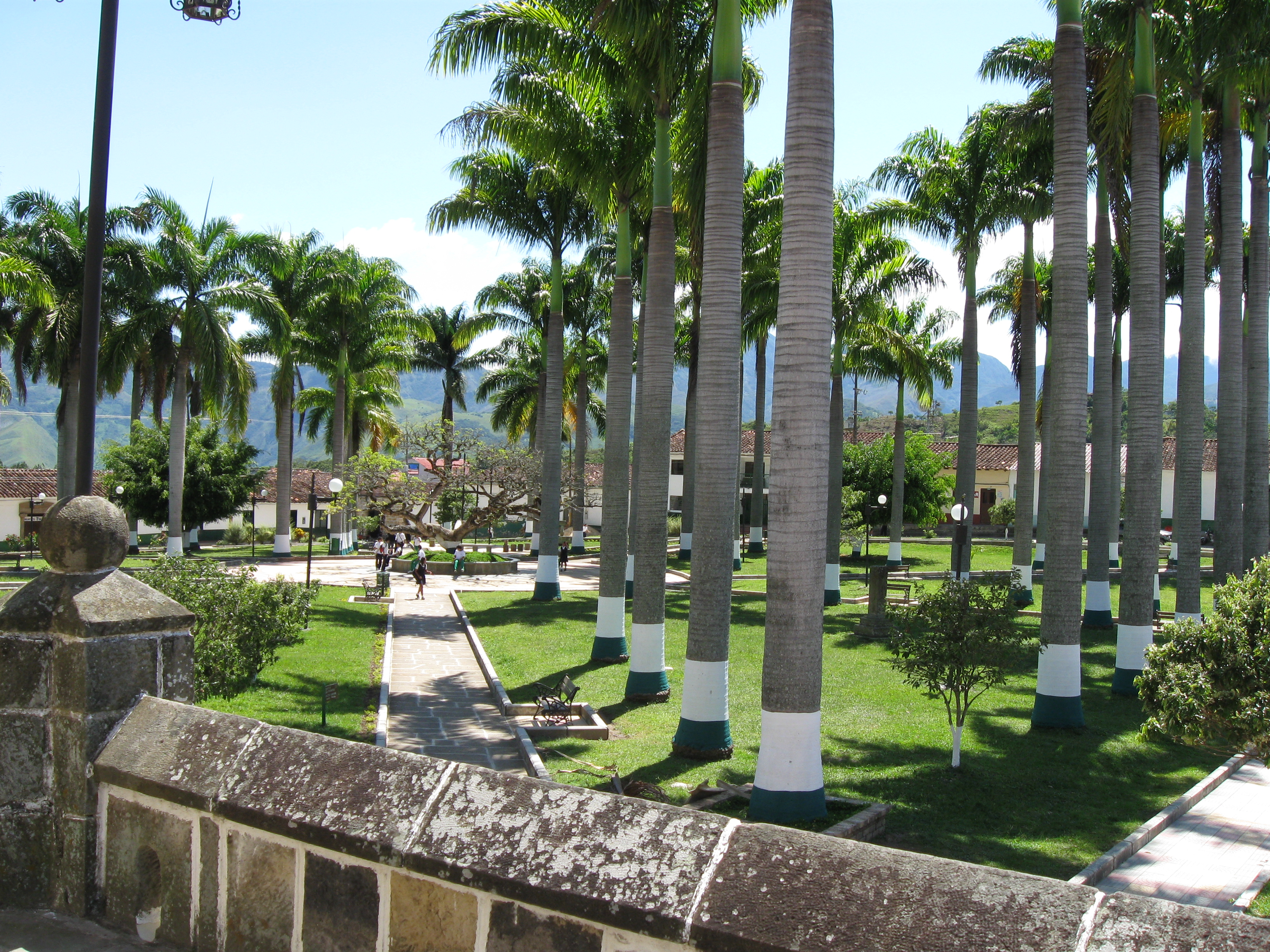
View Parque principal Guadalupe, Santander

== Tourism ==
Among the sites of interest are:

- El Salitre pond: consists of a stream of water that gets heated by sunlight and runs into a natural well carved on the rock by the stream, as natural jacuzzis.
- La Gloria pond: located less than 1 km from El Salitre, it is a natural well where people go swimming and enjoy barbecues.
- La Cueva el Perico: natural cave located about 3 km from the main road that leads to El Mararay village.
- La Peña del Cajón: Natural formation in the form of a cut in the ground, which has a height of 110 mt at its highest point, ideal for rappelling.

Other recommended sites are: La Chorrera Waterfall, La Cueva del indio (The indian´s Cave), la Piedra del Sapo (the Frog´s Stone, Las Gachas stream, La Cueva de los Aviones (The airplanes cave), La LLanera waterfall, Suarez river, and its great church made of hewn stone, which is located in the towns central park. The town has lately attracted many eventual travellers, after someone's initiative of founding a hotel with 25 available rooms which made it easier for tourist to visit and stay to spend some time in the municipality.

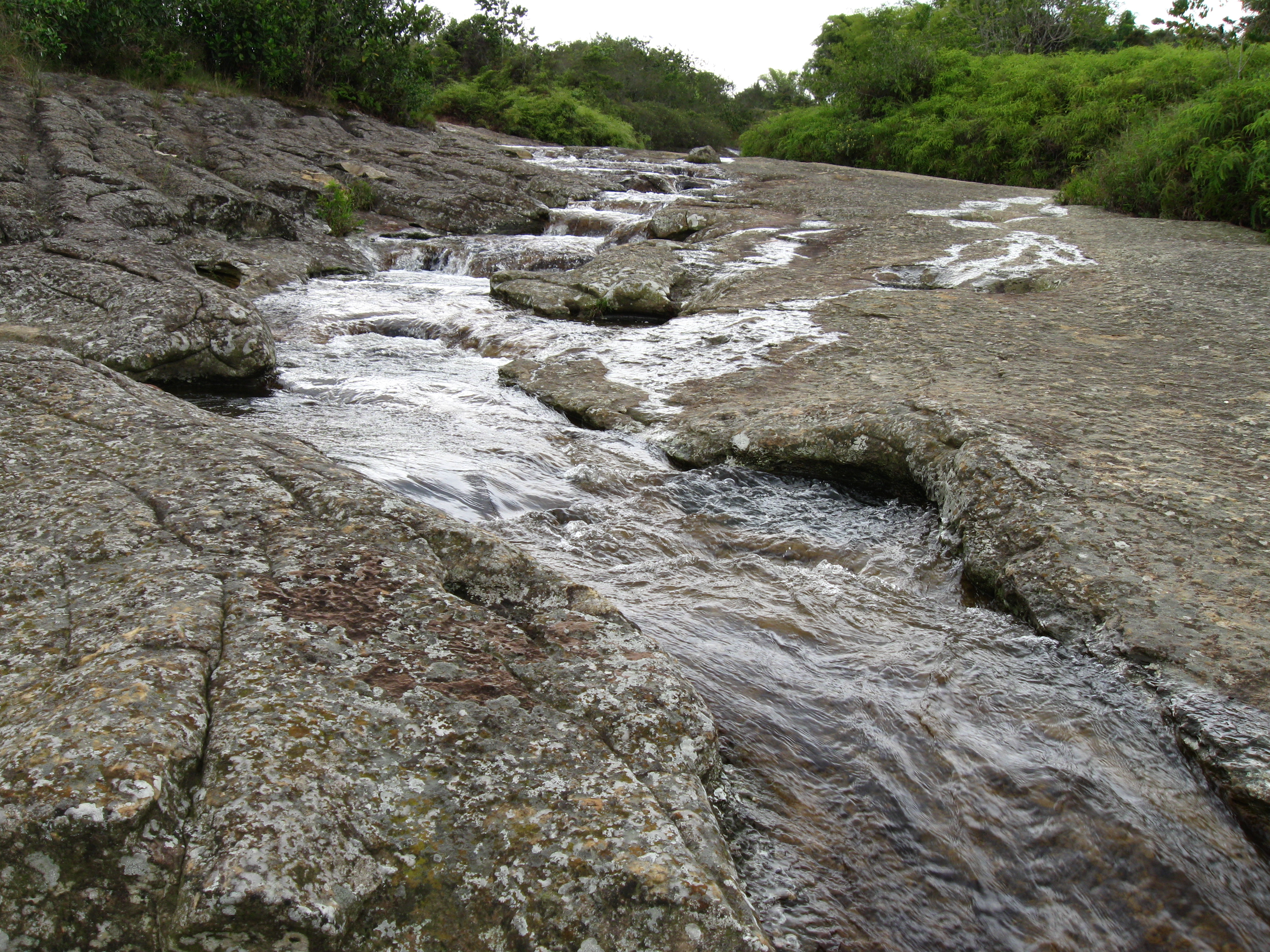
El Salitre1

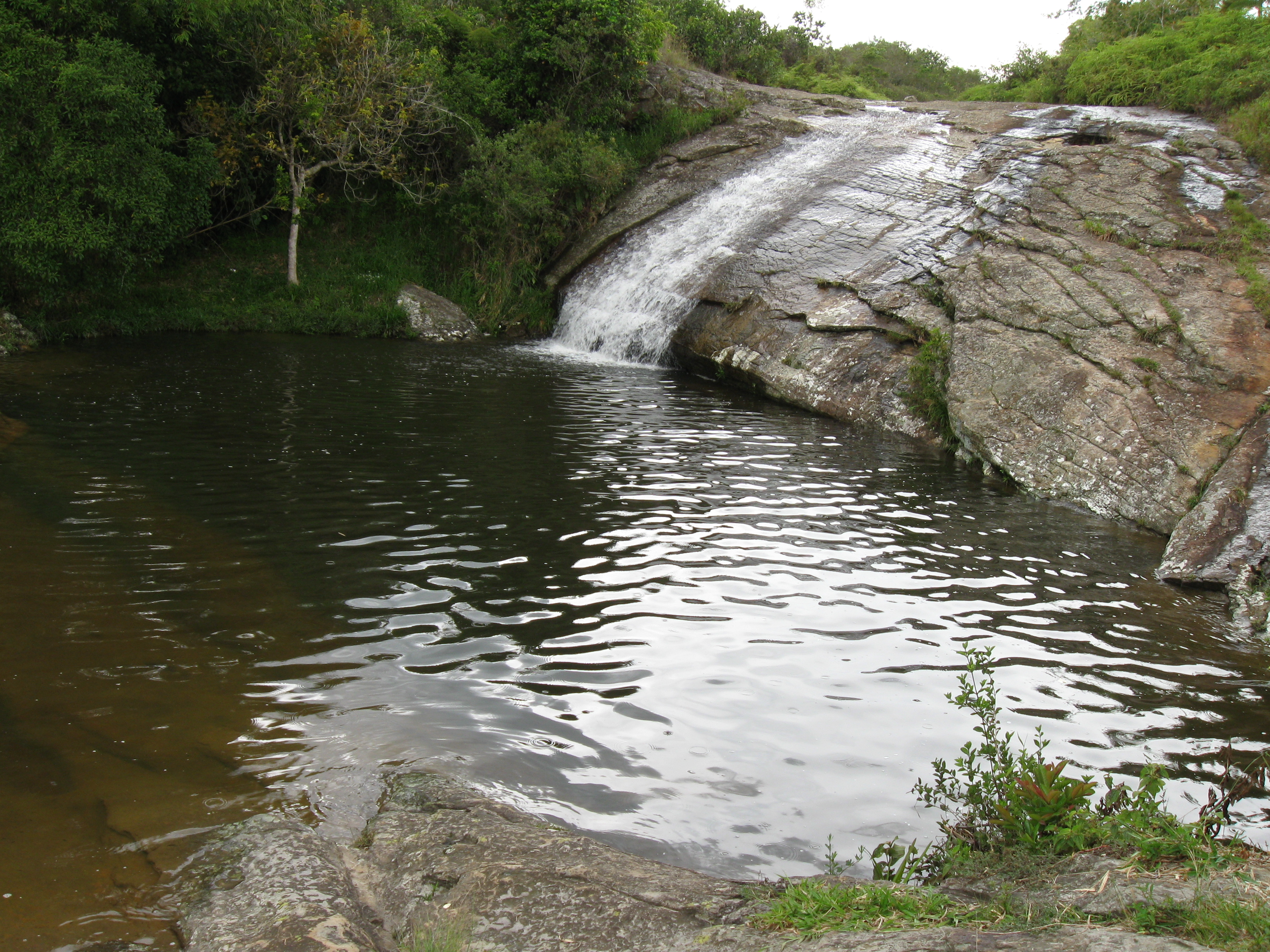
Pozo de la Gloria

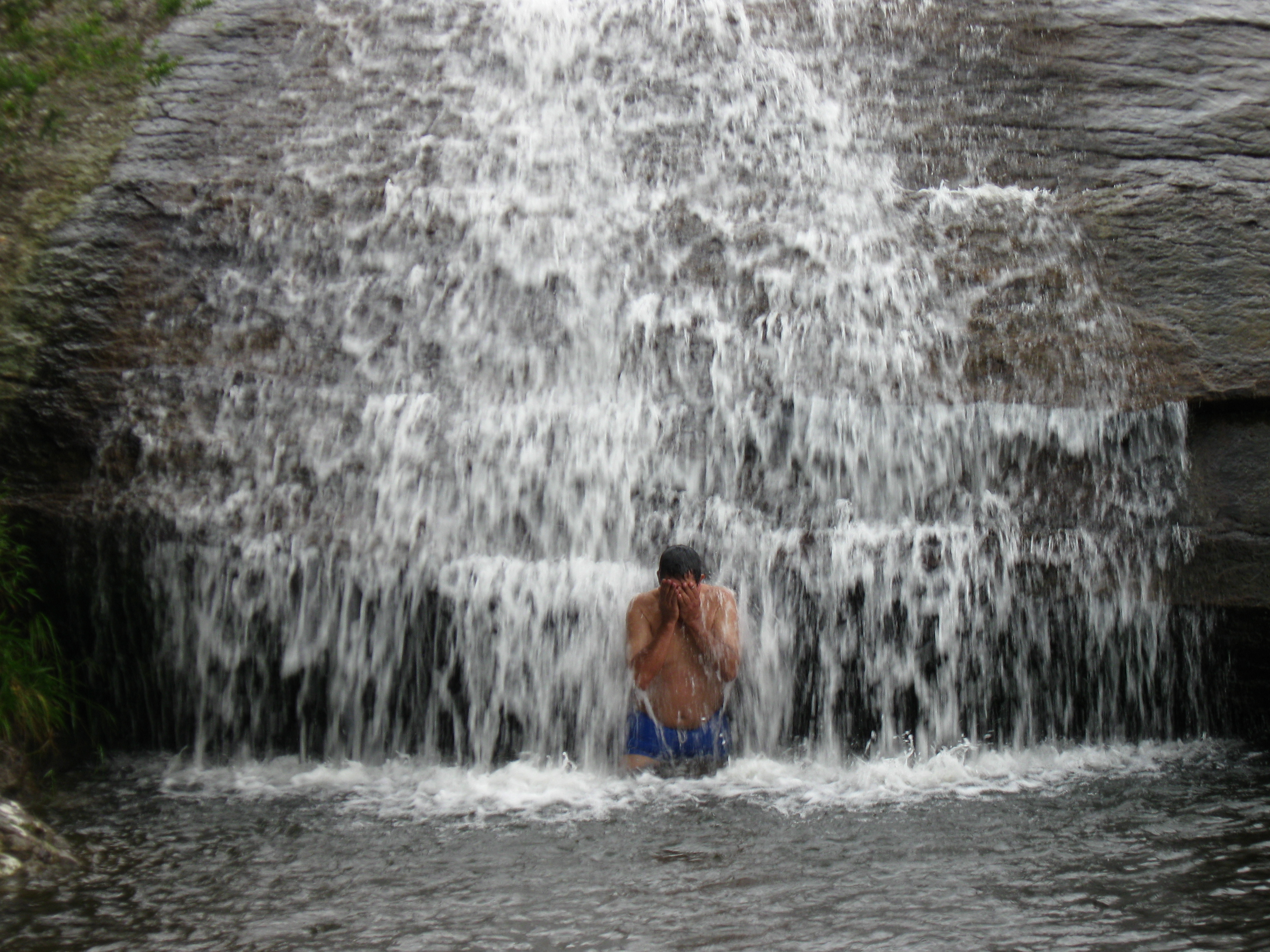
Cascada Pozo de la Gloria

== Economy ==
The town´s economy is based on agriculture and livestock. Other important sources of its economy are the contributions from entities like Multicoop LTDA, with more than 48 years of service, and the Banco Agrario, previously called Caja Agraria.

== Transport ==
The municipality of Guadalupe is connected to the main road, which links Bucaramanga and Bogotá, by a secondary road, connecting, thus, Guadalupe with Oiba. The road to Guadalupe is 60% paved today. The municipal head is also connected with the town of Suaita, passing through the town of San Jose Suaita, where you have access to the central highway that leads to the capital city, Bogota. It is also connected with the municipalities of Contratación and Guapotá. These roads are unpaved but with acceptable conditions for trafficking, although its use for automobile vehicles is not recommended.

== Education ==
Currently, the town has two educational institutions: the Escuela Normal Superior María Auxiliadora and the Instituto Técnico Agropecuario.

== Festivities ==
People in Guadalupe celebrate the following festivities: - Festivity of Virgen el Carmen (16 July) - Festivity of Virgen de Guadalupe (12 December) - Ferias y Fiestas (Fairs and Feasts), generally on the 2nd week of January. - The sports week, generally between September and October.

And other religious celebrations such as Corpus Christi, Festivity of some saints, Holy Week (Easter), and Christmas.

== Media ==
Currently the town has two community media. These are Guadalupe Stereo, a Community radio station www.guadalupestereo.jimdo.com; and the community TV channel, TV Guadalupe. Both media have become the voice of the town´s residents and they have tried to be present in most of the relevant events that take place in Guadalupe.

== Climate ==
Climate data for Guadalupe (Laja La), elevation 1,400 m (4,600 ft), (1981–2010)
Month	Jan	Feb	Mar	Apr	May	Jun	Jul	Aug	Sep	Oct	Nov	Dec	Year
Mean daily maximum °C (°F)	26.3 (79.3)	26.7 (80.1)	27.0 (80.6)	26.5 (79.7)	26.4 (79.5)	26.3 (79.3)	26.3 (79.3)	26.5 (79.7)	26.4 (79.5)	26.0 (78.8)	25.9 (78.6)	26.0 (78.8)	26.3 (79.3)
Daily mean °C (°F)	21.4 (70.5)	21.5 (70.7)	21.6 (70.9)	21.5 (70.7)	21.4 (70.5)	21.3 (70.3)	21.2 (70.2)	21.2 (70.2)	21.1 (70.0)	21.1 (70.0)	21.1 (70.0)	21.4 (70.5)	21.3 (70.3)
Mean daily minimum °C (°F)	15.6 (60.1)	15.3 (59.5)	15.6 (60.1)	16.0 (60.8)	15.9 (60.6)	15.6 (60.1)	15.2 (59.4)	15.1 (59.2)	15.2 (59.4)	15.3 (59.5)	15.6 (60.1)	15.8 (60.4)	15.5 (59.9)
Average precipitation mm (inches)	119.0 (4.69)	165.8 (6.53)	219.4 (8.64)	361.4 (14.23)	373.7 (14.71)	273.7 (10.78)	270.6 (10.65)	276.4 (10.88)	324.0 (12.76)	408.1 (16.07)	342.6 (13.49)	200.3 (7.89)	3,335.1 (131.30)
Average precipitation days	12	13	18	24	24	21	23	22	23	24	22	15	242
Average relative humidity (%)	82	82	81	83	83	83	81	81	82	83	83	83	82
Source: Instituto de Hidrologia Meteorologia y Estudios Ambientales
