= Villa de Guadalupe, Mexico City =

Former separate town, now a neighborhood of northern Mexico City

Coordinates: 19.485633°N 99.116796°W

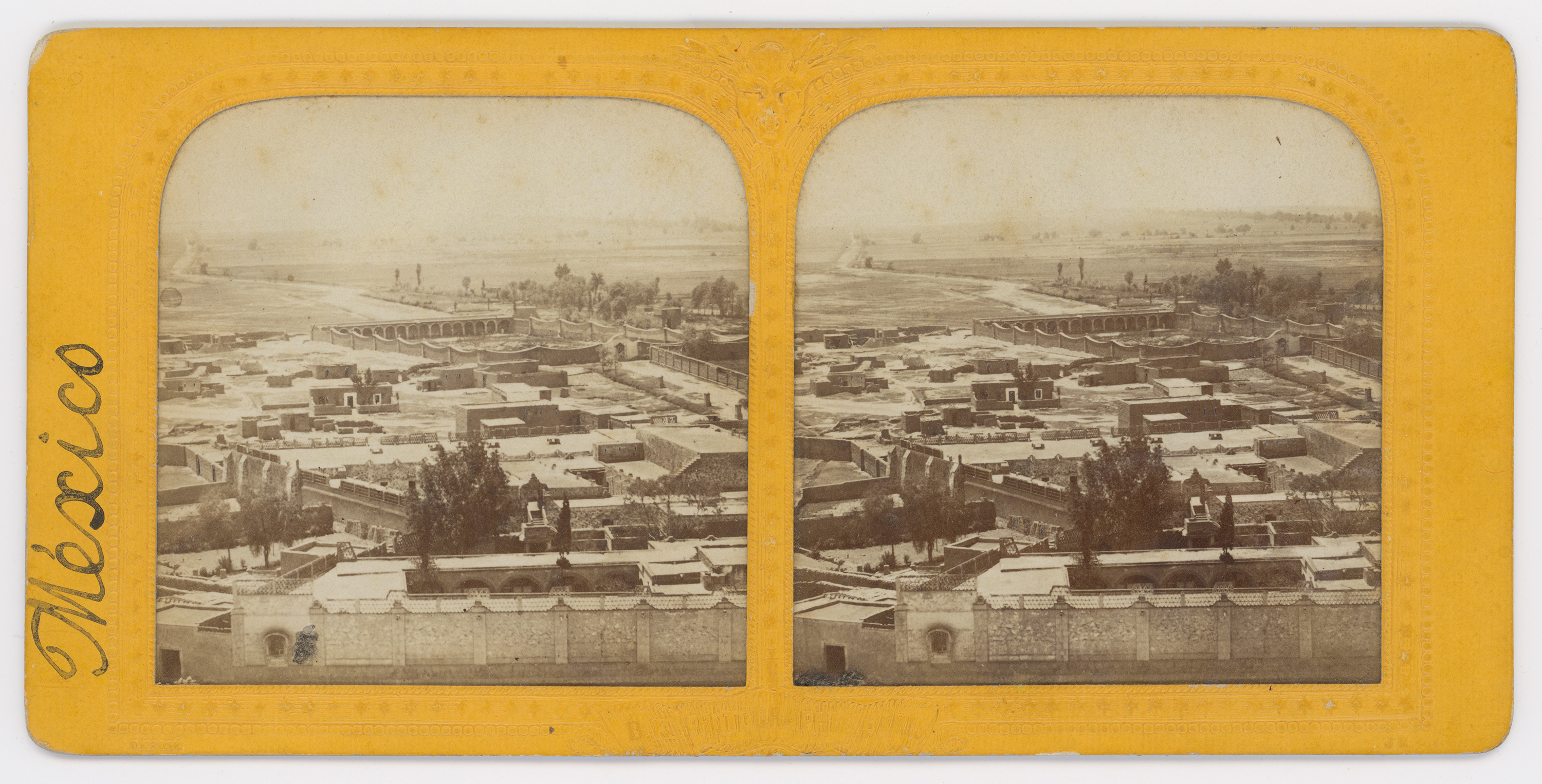
Stereocard of 'Ville de Guadalupe'

Colonia Villa de Guadalupe (also known as La Villa de Guadalupe Hidalgo) is a former separate town, now a neighborhood in northern Mexico City which, in 1531, was the site of the alleged apparition of Our Lady of Guadalupe, the most renowned Marian apparition in the Americas. She is venerated in the Our Lady of Guadalupe Shrine, located in the villa (town).

== Etymology ==
The word Guadalupe comes from Spain, where it was originally the name of a river.

== History ==
La Villa de Guadalupe is located in Mexico City (formerly called the Mexican Federal District) within the borough of Gustavo A. Madero. The town was founded in 1563 and chartered as the city of "Villa de Guadalupe Hidalgo" in 1828. The city was named after Miguel Hidalgo y Costilla, the initiator of the Mexican War of Independence.

The Treaty of Guadalupe Hidalgo (1848) which ended the Mexican–American War was signed there.

== See also ==
- 1848 in Mexico
