= Guadalupe Municipality =

Guadalupe Municipality may refer to several municipalities of Mexican states:

- Guadalupe Municipality, Chihuahua
- Guadalupe Municipality, Nuevo León
- Guadalupe Municipality, Oaxaca
- Guadalupe Municipality, Puebla
- Guadalupe Municipality, Zacatecas

== See also ==
- Guadalupe y Calvo Municipality, Chihuahua
- Guadalupe Victoria Municipality, Durango
- San Juan de Guadalupe Municipality, Durango
