= Guadalupe, Piauí =

Municipality in Brazil

Guadalupe
- Municipality
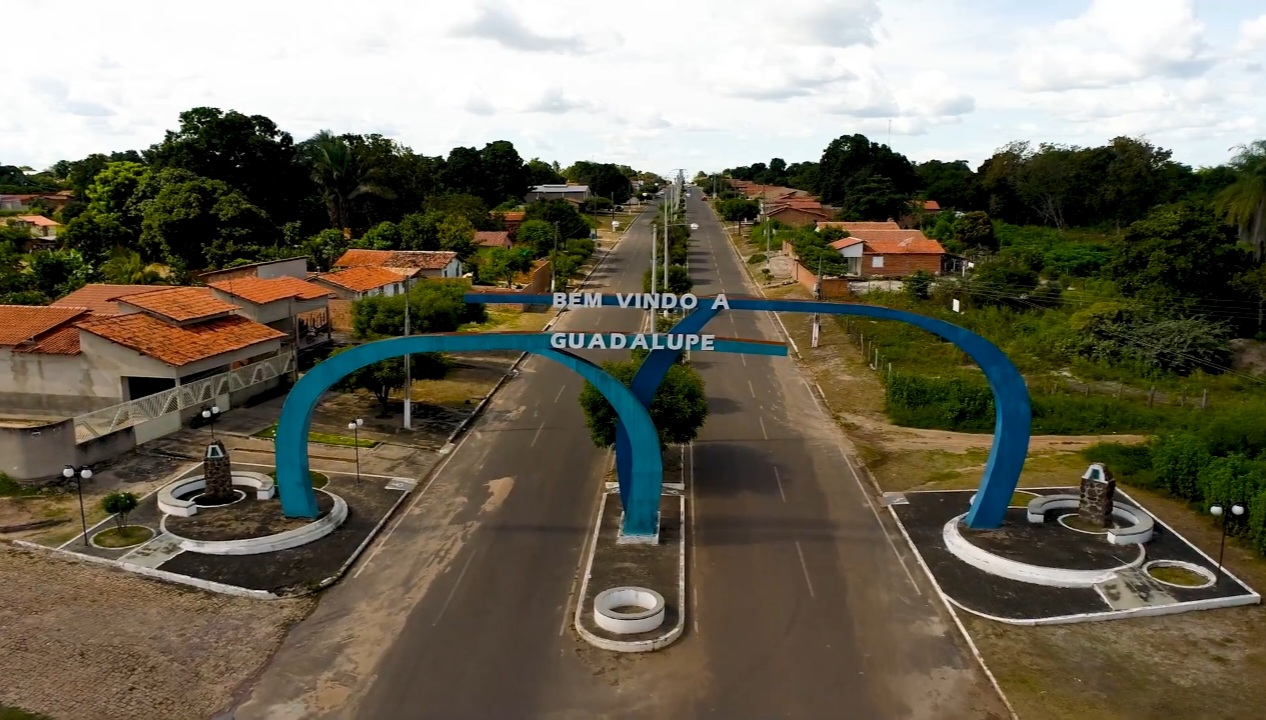

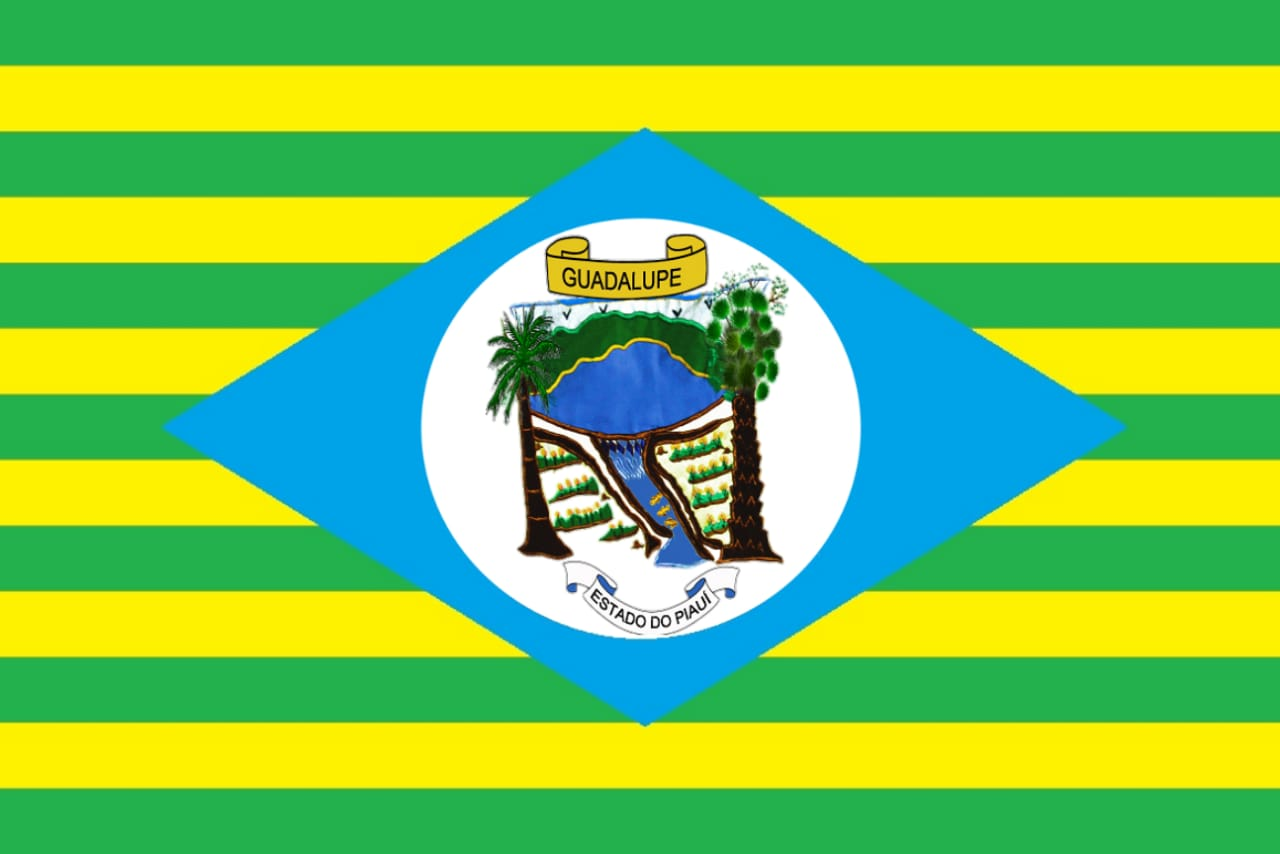
- Flag

- Location in Piauí state

- Location in Brazil
- Coordinates: 6°47′13″S 43°34′8″W
- Country: Brazil
- Region: Northeast
- State: Piauí
- Elevation: 177 m (581 ft)

Population (2020)
  - Total: 10,497
- Time zone: UTC−3 (BRT)

Guadalupe is a municipality of the Brazilian state of Piaui. It is located in latitude 06° 47' 13" south and longitude 43° 34' 09" west, with an elevation of 177 meters.

The Boa Esperança Hydroelectric Power Plant is in Guadalupe, and provides electricity to the state of Piauí.
