= Valle de Guadalupe, Querétaro =

Coordinates: 21°22′10″N 99°12′00″W

Valle de Guadalupe is a village in Querétaro, Mexico. It is located in the municipality of Landa de Matamoros. As of 2020, it has 809 inhabitants, and is located at 1635 meters above sea level.
