= Guadalupe (name) =

Unisex given name in the Spanish language

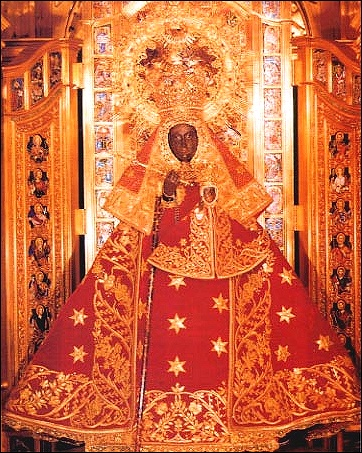
Our Lady of Guadalupe in Extremadura

Guadalupe is a unisex given name in the Spanish language. The name initially designated the Guadalupe river in the province of Extremadura, Spain.

== History ==
The name first became famous as a result of a 14th-century Marian apparition in Spain and associated pilgrimage site, located in a town called Guadalupe near the source of the Guadalupe river. The apparition, and the statue associated with it, was originally known as "Our Lady of Guadalupe" and is now known as "Our Lady of Guadalupe, Extremadura" or "Our Lady of Extremadura".

Two centuries later, the name gained additional fame through association with another Marian apparition in Mexico, also associated with the name Guadalupe. The apparition and the image it made famous became known as Our Lady of Guadalupe.

The name is believed to be derived from the Arabic phrase وادي اللب, (wādī al-lubb; English: "hidden river", or "river of the core"), because the river narrows down as it flows near to the town of Guadalupe. An alternative etymological explanation, which is commonly found on the internet, states that the name may have derived from the Arabic word for 'valley' or 'river' (wadi) and the Latin word lupus, meaning 'wolf'. Another possibility is that it comes from وادي الحب, (wādī al-hubb; "river of love").

The Mexican Guadalupe supplanted her Spanish original both in name and in fame. There are some who contend that the Mexican "Guadalupe" is in fact a corruption of a word in the native Nahuatl language. Nonetheless it is fairly certain that the Mexican name "Guadalupe", as a title for the Virgin Mary, does in fact derive from the Spanish place-name, probably by some association of the Virgin with the cultus of Our Lady of Guadalupe, Extremadura, which would have been strong at the time of the Spanish Conquista of Mexico, and which claimed its own apparition, shrine and pilgrimage.

The name's use in relation to the Marian apparition in Mexico has led to some controversy regarding its origin and meaning. The name's similarity to a variety of Nahuatl words and phrases have given rise to various hypotheses that "Guadalupe" was a corruption of these Nahuatl phrases – the idea being that the white Spaniards in 16th century Mexico found it difficult to pronounce the Nahuatl words. Such Nahuatl phrases include Coatlaxopeuh ("The one (female) who defeats the snake", interpreted as a reference to the serpent-Devil in the book of Genesis); Tequatlanopeuh ("she whose origins were in the rocky summit"), and Tequantlaxopeuh ("She who banishes those who devoured us"). The first to suggest the corruption theory behind the name was Bercera Tanco, in 1675.

However, every manuscript from the first 150 years following the apparition uses the name "Guadalupe", including the original text in Nahuatl, leading scholars to conclude that time provides "no historical evidence indicating that the Virgin was called by any of the names proposed". In fact, accounts of Spaniards' response to the story of the apparitions show that it was the native Mexicans who insisted on using the name "Guadalupe" for Mary. A number of Spaniards had urged that "Guadalupe" be abandoned for a Nahuatl name, like Tepeaquilla or Tepeaca.

Today, the name "Guadalupe" is relatively common in Hispanic countries, especially in Mexico, where it can be a personal name as well as a place name. As a personal name, it can be given to both boys and girls. Notable examples of men named Guadalupe are Guadalupe Victoria, the first President of Mexico, and Guadalupe Acosta Naranjo, a Mexican politician.

== Notable people ==
- Guadalupe Victoria, nom de guerre of the first President of Mexico
- Guadalupe Canseco (born 1962), Mexican Olympic diver
- María Guadalupe Jones Garay, best known as Lupita Jones (born 1967), Mexican businesswoman, former model and beauty queen
- Guadalupe Ortiz de Landázuri Fernández de Heredia, (1916–1975), Spanish chemist
- Guadalupe Sabio (born 1977), Spanish scientist
- María Guadalupe Sánchez (racewalker, born 1977), Mexican race walker
- María Guadalupe Villalobos Vélez, known as Lupe Vélez (1908–1944), a Mexican film actress who starred in many classic Hollywood films during the Classical Hollywood cinema and Mexican films during the Golden Age of Mexican cinema.
- Guadalupe Hayes-Mota, Mexican-American biotechnologist and business director.
