= Possible Nahuatl etymologies of Guadalupe =

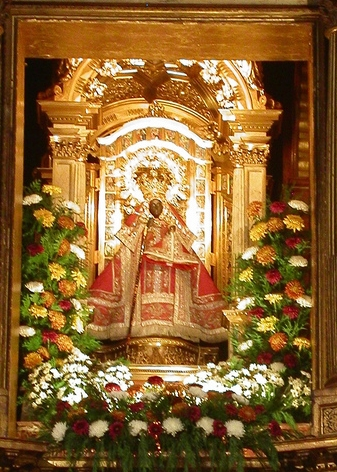

Because Juan Diego did not speak Spanish, it has been proposed by multiple authors that the name "Guadalupe", referring to the image of Our Lady of Guadalupe, was likely derived from a word in Nahuatl. While it is not the ultimate origin of the name, as prior to the Spanish conquest of the Aztec Empire it was already associated with the veneration of Mary at the Our Lady of Guadalupe in Extremadura in Guadalupe, Cáceres, Spain, some authors have proposed that a similar-sounding Nahuatl word was interpreted by the Spanish as "Guadalupe" due to the connection.

== Coatlaxopeuh ==
Coatlaxopeuh ("She who crushes the serpent") is a word proposed by Mariano Jacobo Rojas of Tepoztlán as a possible Nahuatl origin of the word Guadalupe, the appellation of Our Lady of Guadalupe. The suggestion of a Nahuatl etymology for this name was part of the indigenista debates of the mid-20th-century Mexico, in which prominent intellectuals reinterpreted Mexican history with a renewed emphasis on the nation's indigenous heritage. Many other proposed Nahuatl etymologies of Guadalupe have been suggested; however, in the devotional literature, coatlaxopeuh remains the most widely accepted.

== Tequantlanopeuh ==
The earliest suggestion that the word "Guadalupe" was a corruption of an original Nahuatl word was by the priest Luis Becerra y Tanco in 1666. He proposed that because Juan Diego did not speak Spanish, and since the Nahuatl language did not have the voiced consonants "g" or "d", it was likely that the name had originally been a Nahuatl word which was later misheard by Spaniards as “Guadalupe”. He proposed that the original name could have been "tequantlanopeuh" which he translated as "She who originated from the summit of the rocks".

== Tlecuauhtlapeupeuh ==
Father Mario Rojas Sánchez who translated the Nicān Mopōhua suggested the Nahuatl name "Tlecuauhtlapeupeuh," which he translates as "She who emerges from the region of light like the Eagle from fire".

Scholar Jeanette Rodríguez, citing Xavier Escalada, notes "the Nahuatl language does not contain the letters d and g; therefore Our Lady's name could not have been "Guadalupe". She also presents the theory that Juan Diego and his uncle called the Virgin "Tlecuauhtlacupeuh", saying "The Nahuatl understanding of 'Tlecuauhtlacupeuh' is La que viene volando de la luz como el águila de fuego (she who comes flying from the region of light like an eagle of fire). The region of light was the dwelling place of the Aztec gods, and the eagle was a sign from the gods. To the Spaniards, it sounded like 'Guadalupe' and reminded them of their Virgin at home."

Rodríguez holds that the Spanish thought of "Guadalupe of Estremadura, Spain. [As] A large number of conquistadors were from the province of Estremadura and quite naturally were devoted to the local patroness. ...the devotion to Our Lady of Guadalupe in Estremadura was reaching its peak at the time of the first contacts between Spain and the New World".

Rodríguez adds that the name "To the Spaniards...reminded them of their Virgin at home. To the natives, it...referred to a sign that had come from their gods." This allowed each side to see in the story something it "understood and valued, which would inevitably bring them together as a unifying force."

== Coatlalopeuh ==
Gloria Anzaldúa, in her book Borderlands / La Frontera, proposes the indigenous origin of Guadalupe as Coatlalopeuh, which she translates as "She Who Has Dominion over Serpents." She argues that because Coatlalopeuh sounds like Guadalupe, the Spanish saw Coatlalopeuh as parallel or identical to "the dark Virgin, Guadalupe, patroness of West Central Spain" (Page 27). Anzaldúa gives Coatlaxopeuh as a variant name. She sees both versions as being linked historically to Cōātlīcue, whose name means "Serpent Skirt."

== Bibliography ==
- Anzaldúa, Gloria E. (2000). "Coatlalopeuh, la que domina a los serpientes." in Ana Castillo, ed., La diosa de las Américas. New York: Random House|Vintage Books. ISBN 0-375-70369-1.
- Anzaldúa, Gloria E. 2007. Borderlands / La Frontera: The New Mestiza. 3rd ed. San Francisco: Aunt Lute Books.
- Barnes, Rhonda L. 1997. Demanding Social Equality: A Feminist Re-Interpretation of the Virgin of Guadalupe.
- Becerra Tanco, Luis. 1979 [1675]. Felicidad de México. 3a ed. facsimilar. México: Editorial Jus.
- Behrens (von Habsburg), Helen. 1952. The Treasure of México. México ?: published by the author.
- Behrens (von Habsburg), Helen. 1966. The Virgin and the Serpent God. México: Editorial Progreso.
- Dávila Garibi, Ignacio. 1936. Breve estudio histórico-etimológico acerca del vocablo "Guadalupe". 4a ed. Mexico: Imp. Emilio Pardo e Hijos.
- Keen, Benjamin. 1971. The Aztec Image in Western Thought. New Brunswick: Rutgers University Press.
- Lafaye, Jacques. 1977. Quetzalcóatl y Guadalupe: La Formación de la conciencia nacional en México. México: Fondo de Cultura Económica
- Leatham, Miguel. 1989. "Indigenista Hermeneutics and the Historical Meaning of Our Lady of Guadalupe of Mexico". Folklore Forum 22:1/2 (1989).
- León-Portilla, Miguel. 1978. Aztec Thought and Culture: A Study of the Ancient Náhuatl Mind. 5th printing. Norman, Okla.: University of Oklahoma Press
- Phelan, John. 1960. "Neo-Aztecism in the Eighteenth Century and the Genesis of Mexican Nationalism". In Culture and History: Essays in Honor of Paul Radin, ed. S. Diamond, pp.761–770. New York: Columbia University Press.
- Rodríguez, Mauro. 1980. Guadalupe: ¿Historia o símbolo? México: Editorial Edicol.
- Rojas Sánchez, Mario, trans. 1978. Nican Mopohua. Puebla: Diócesis de Huejutla.
- Rojas Sánchez, Mario, and J. Hernández Illescas. 1983. Las Estrellas del manto de la Virgen de Guadalupe. México: Francisco Méndez Oteo.
- Wolf, Eric. 1958. "The Virgin of Guadalupe: A Mexican National Symbol". Journal of American Folklore 71:34-39.
