= Testerian =

Pictorial writing system used to proselytize Christianity to indigenous Mexican peoples

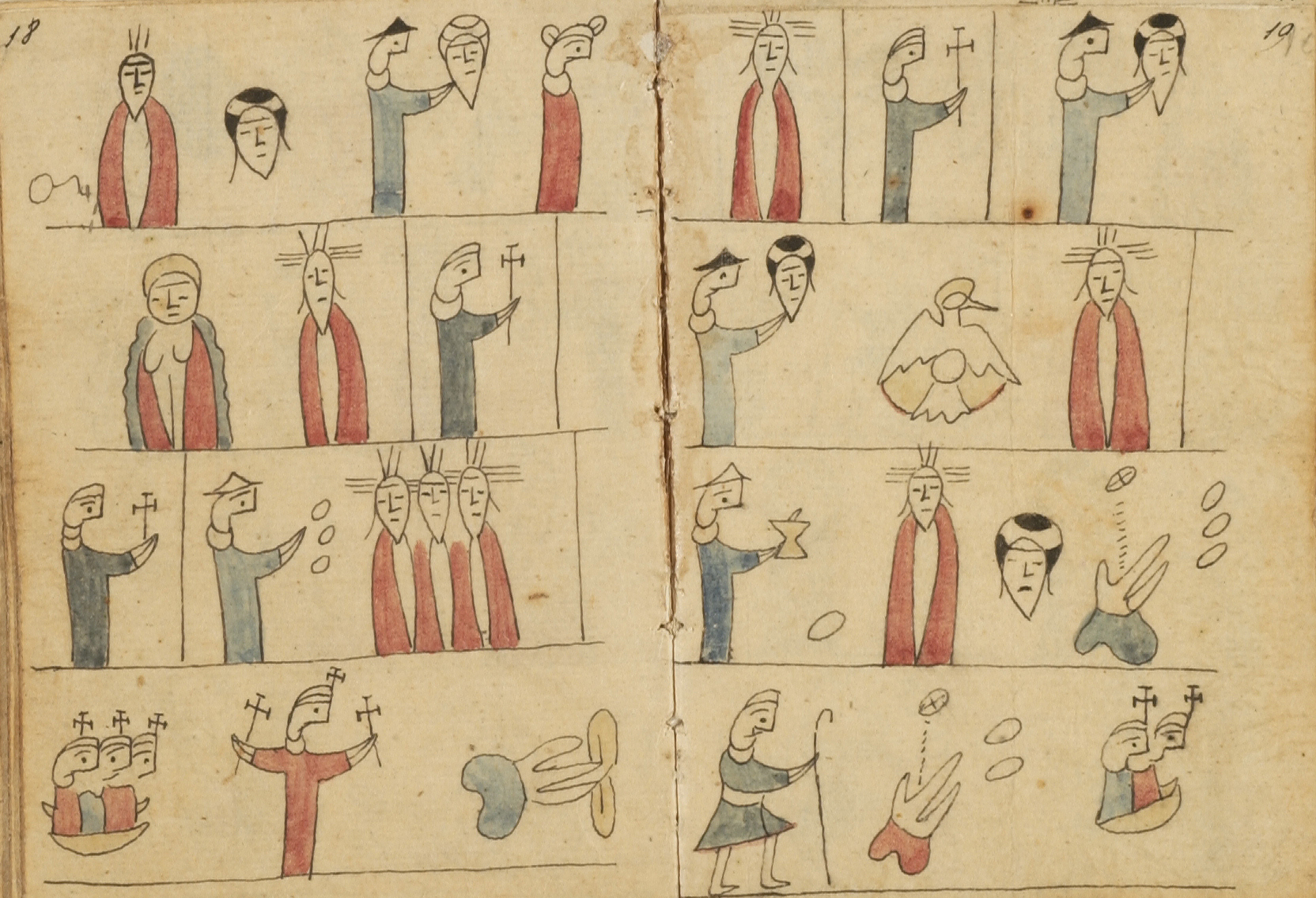
- Script type: Pictographic
- Creator: Jacobo de Testera
- Period: 16th to 19th centuries
- Direction: Boustrophedon
- Languages: Various

Testerian is a pictorial writing system that was used until the 19th century to teach Christian doctrine to the indigenous peoples of Mexico, who were unfamiliar with alphabetic writing systems. The invention of Testerian catechisms is attributed to Jacobo de Testera, a Franciscan who arrived in Mexico in 1529.

== Bibliography ==
- Haberly, David (1963). The Hieroglyphic Catechisms of Mexico. Harvard University.
- Leeming, Ben (2005). Preaching With Pictures: How Hieroglyphic Catechisms Shaped Native Mesoamerican Christianity in Sixteenth-Century Mexico.
- Normann, Anne (1985). Testerian Codices: Hieroglyphic Catechisms for Native Conversion in New Spain (Latin America, Catholic Church, Indians, missionaries, Mexico). Tulane University.
- Robertson, Donald (1994). Mexican Manuscript Painting of the Early Colonial Period: The Metropolitan Schools. University of Oklahoma Press. pp. 53–55. ISBN 0-585-14632-2.
- Catecismo pictórico Otomí
