= Faustino Galicia =

Mexican lawyer (1802–1877)

Faustino Chimalpopoca Galicia or Faustino Chimalpopoca (tl) (1802–1877) was an Indigenous Mexican lawyer, professor, translator, and administrator. He was educated at San Gregorio and San Ildefonso, his studies were supported by Agustín de Iturbide.

Chimalpopoca was an active participant in the debates about citizenship, indigeneity, and religion that characterized the transition to the national period. He was the most active scholar of the Nahuatl language of the 19th century. Chimalpopoca is a Nahuatl name usually translated as "smoking shield", also borne by the third Aztec ruler. Under the Second Mexican Empire, he was appointed as an advisor to the government in 1865.

== Early life ==
Galicia was born in 1802 in San Pedro Tláhuac as a child of the Indigenous elite.

Little is known about Galicia Chimalpopoca's childhood. At around 1810, he was studying at the Colegio de San Gregorio, in Mexico City, a school run by the Catholic Church, and which was also known to have housed extensive Nahuatl documents. He would eventually become a professor at the same institution teaching Nahuatl and law.

After Mexican independence in 1821, there was debate on whether the Colegio de San Gregorio would continue to be a religious school, and Chimalpopoca was in favor of keeping it as such.

In 1849, shortly after the Mexican–American War, Chimalpopoca served as president of the Board of Public education for the ayuntamiento in Mexico City.

He wrote about the importance of instruction of science, tradition, and religion, and proposed establishing a school for teachers. He also lobbied for Catholic religious material to be printed in Nahuatl and distributed throughout Mexico City.

In 1856, as part of La Reforma, the liberal Mexican government through the Ley Lerdo, forced "corporate entities" to dispose of their lands and sell them to individuals. This measure was aimed at the Catholic Church and at Mexico's Indigenous communities that held land as corporations. During this time Chimalpopoca served as an attorney defending the rights of indigenous peoples whose community lands were threatened by the new laws. He became the official property administrator for the Indigenous residential district of San Juan Tenochtitlan in Mexico City. During this period, he was also professor of Nahuatl at the University of Mexico.

== First and Second Mexican Empire ==
During the First Mexican Empire, Chimalpopoca who served as Commissioner of the Indigenous Administration for the management and representation of Indigenous affairs in 1822 under the General Directorate of Public Instruction.

In the second French intervention in Mexico, Chimalpopoca was a notable participant during and the establishment of the Second Mexican Empire. He was among the Assembly of Notables that elected Maximilian as Emperor. He gave a speech before an Indigenous crowd, which was later published in the press, celebrating the defeat of the liberals at the hands of the French, praising the Empire, and emphasizing the importance of religion for the nation.

He was the personal tutor and interpreter of Nahuatl to Emperor Maximilian, and was named president of the Council for the Protection of the Impoverished. He found a place among the Emperor's inner circle and lobbied extensively to improve the lives of the marginalized, especially his fellow Indigenous Mexicans. The council has records of 272 complaints received totaling 4,800 pages, dealing with issues such as working conditions, land, and water issues. In addition to reviewing such complaints the council also opened a maternity hospital and an orphanage. Chimalpopoca kept Maximilian briefed on the council's activities.

The regime of Maximilian was propped up by the French Army, and when Napoleon III withdrew the troops and the Republican forces had success on the battlefield, the Empire was doomed. After a last stand in Querétaro, the Emperor was captured by liberal forces in May 1867. He was tried and then executed on June 19. Republican forces attempted to capture Chimalpopoca, but he escaped detection by hiding in the basement of his home. All of his properties were confiscated by the government of the Restored Republic. He lived in exile in France, but later returned to Mexico. He died in 1877.

== Published works ==
- Silabario de idioma mexicano (1849)
- Epítome o modo fácil de aprender el idioma nahuatl o lengua mexicana (1869)
