= Tecayehuatzin of Huexotzinco =

Tecayehuatzin
- Born: Second Half of 15th Century
- Died: Early 16th Century

Tecayehuatzin, was lord of Huexotzinco.

== Poetry ==
Though remembered as a politician, Tecayehuatzin has been a poet with several poems surviving.

Poems attributed to Tecayehuatzin include:

- Tla Oc Toncuicacan (Now Let Us Sing)
- Tlatolpehualiztli (The Beginning of the Dialogue)
- Itlatol Temictli (The Dream of a Word)
