= Testerian catechisms =

Documents used by Catholic missionaries in New Spain

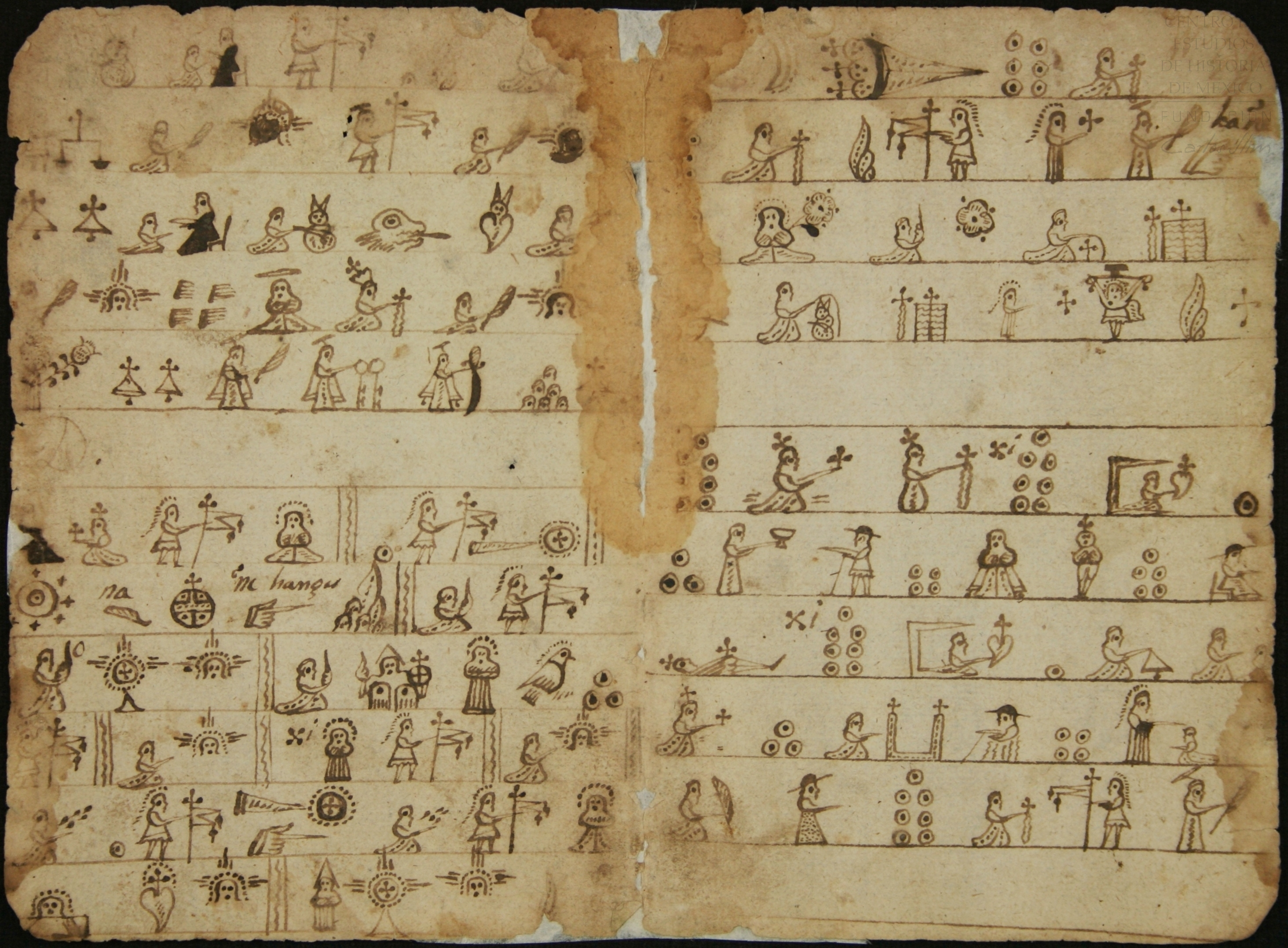
Testerian catechism, c. 1524. Centre of Studies of History of Mexico Carso

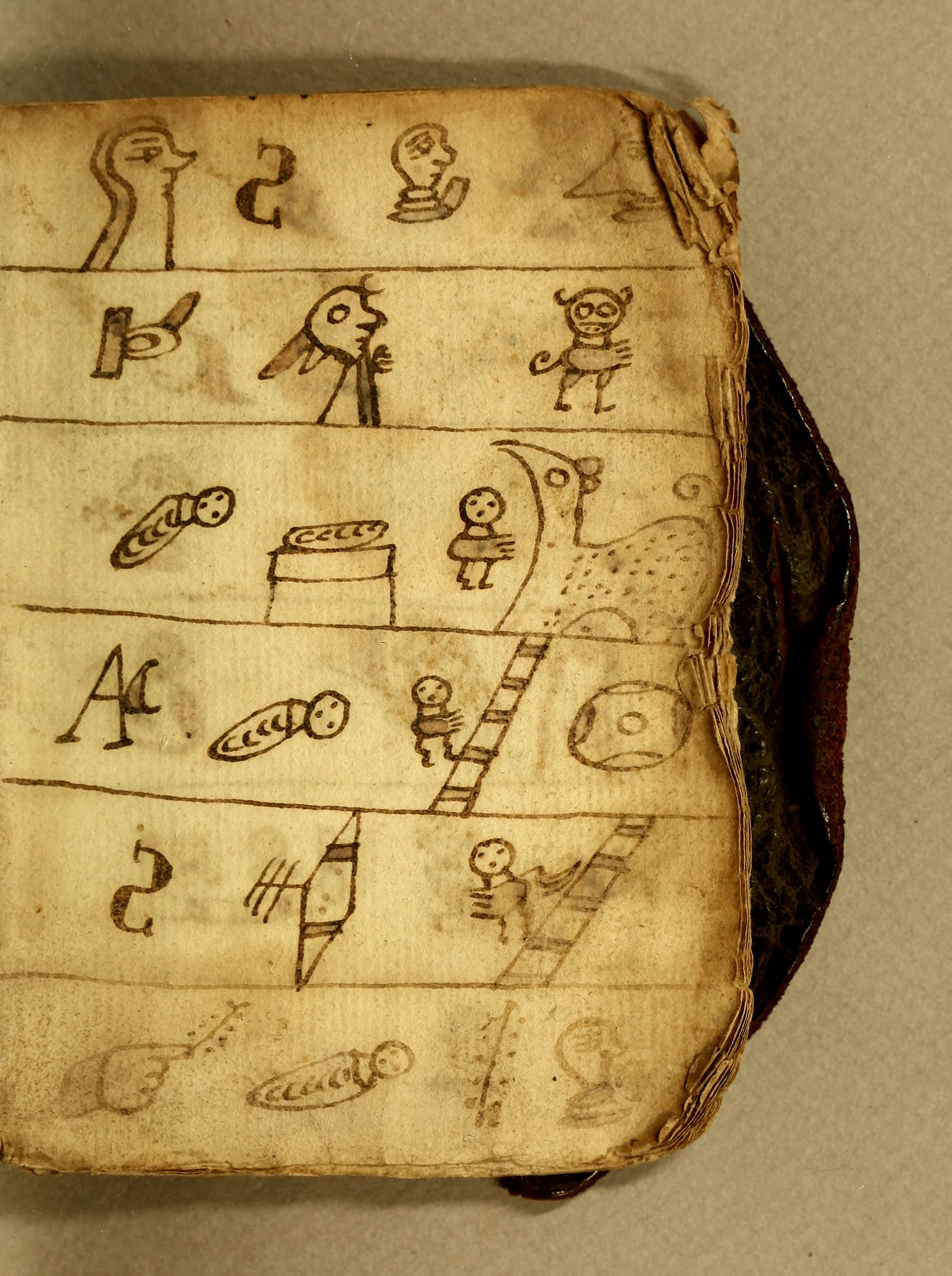
Page from the Catecismo Testerino (circa 1700s) manuscript codex at the John Carter Brown Library

The Testerian catechisms (Spanish: Catecismos testerianos) were religious documents that were used in the Christian evangelization of the Spanish American colony of New Spain. They explain Catholic doctrine through sequential images based on indigenous conventions used prior to the Conquest of Mexico and the introduction of the Latin alphabet to write the indigenous languages of Mesoamerica. These documents were an attempt at educational materials for Christians who were either not literate in Spanish, or unfamiliar with the aboriginal languages then spoken in the territory that is now Mexico. They were named after Jacobo of Testera, a Franciscan friar who elaborated catechisms of this type.

== Context ==
The missionaries who participated in the evangelization of the American continents looked for ways to transmit the new doctrine. Native Mesoamerican images and documents were subject to destruction, as they were considered idolatric materials, but were tolerated when used in a Christian religious context. Theatrical performances, music, architecture, public sermons, and other types of media supported the new religious precepts. The Testerian catechisms were used to transmit the Ten Commandments and prayers like the Lord's Prayer and the Hail Mary.

== Images ==
Testerian Codex c. 1524

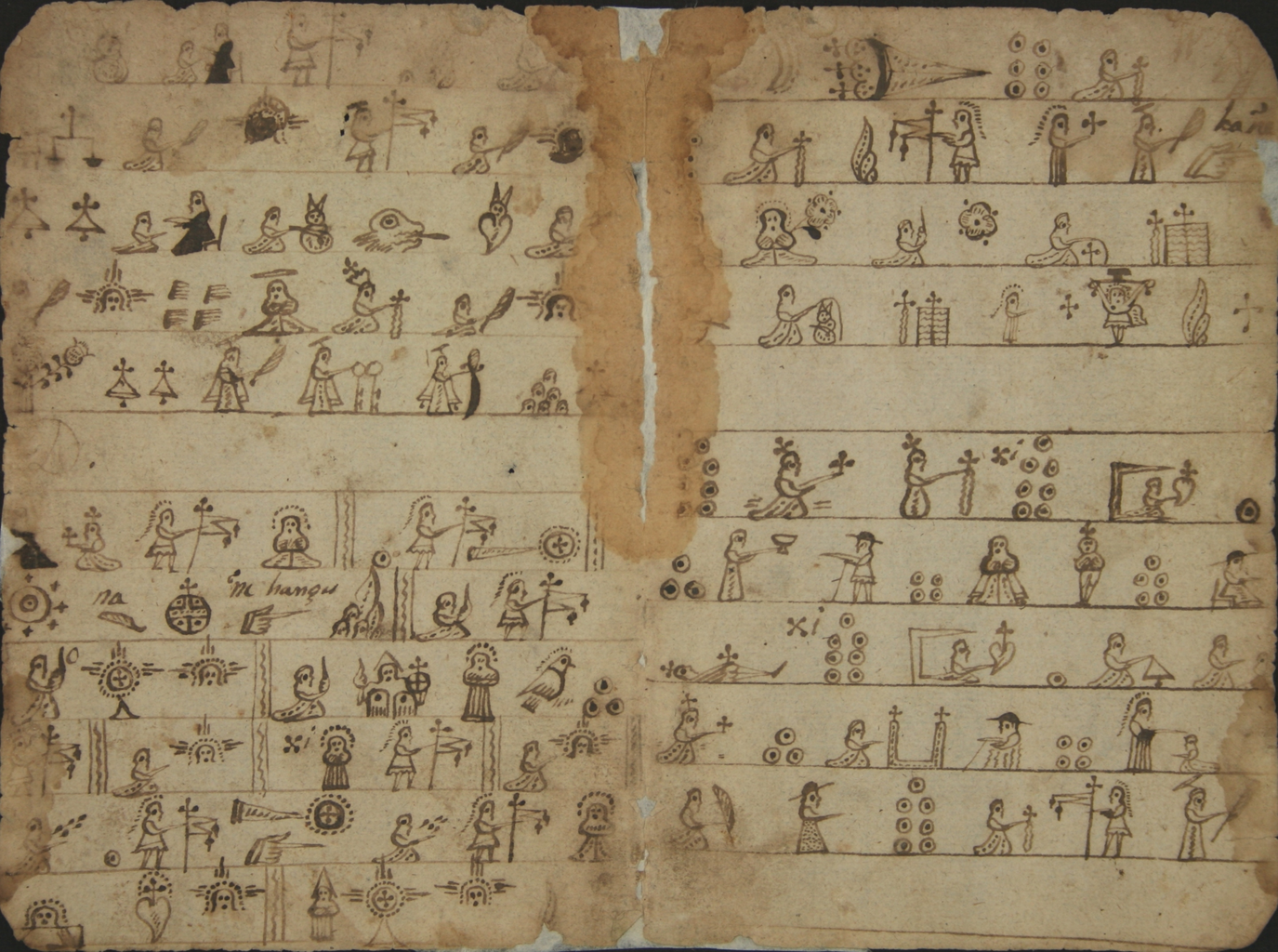

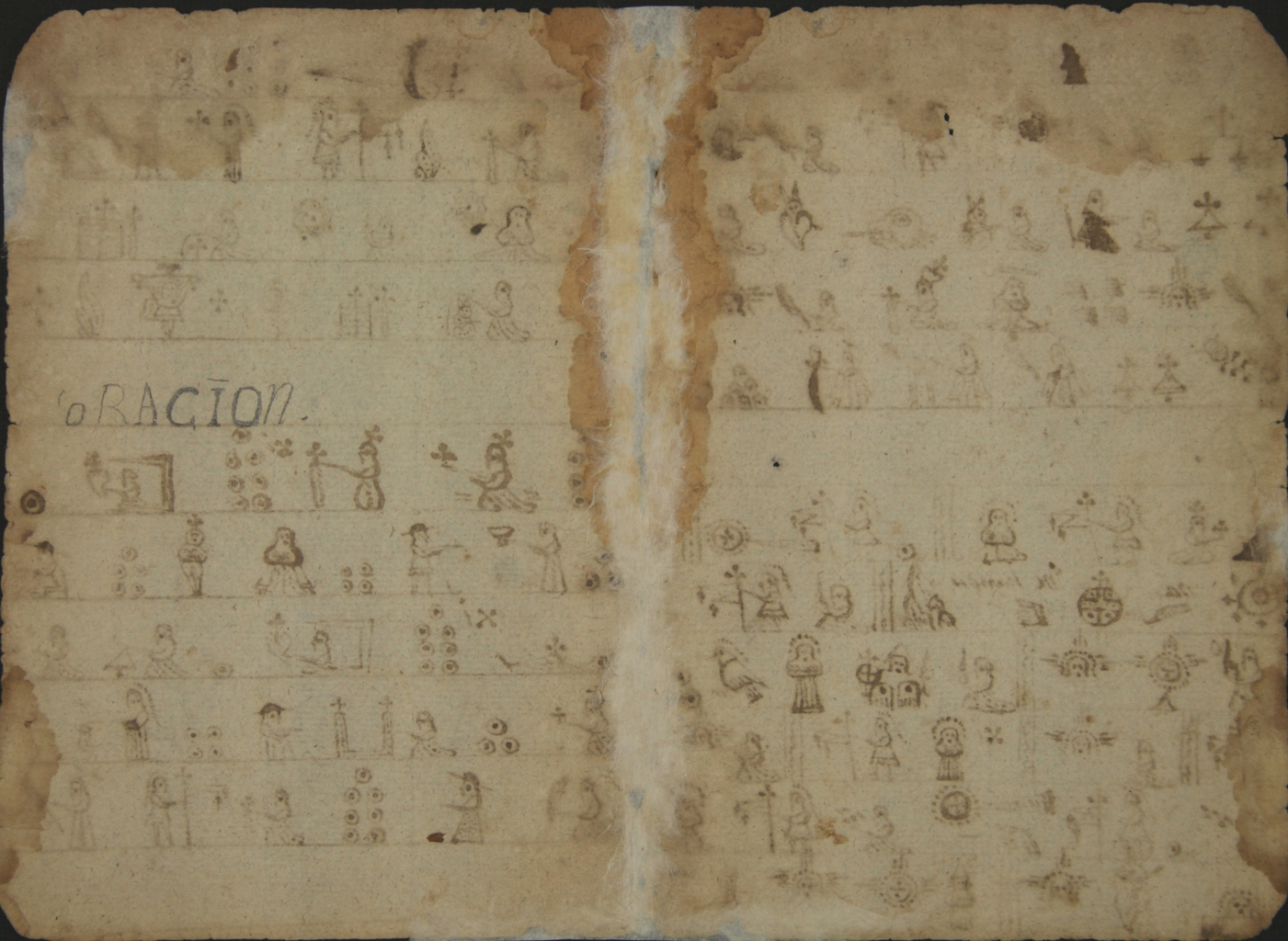

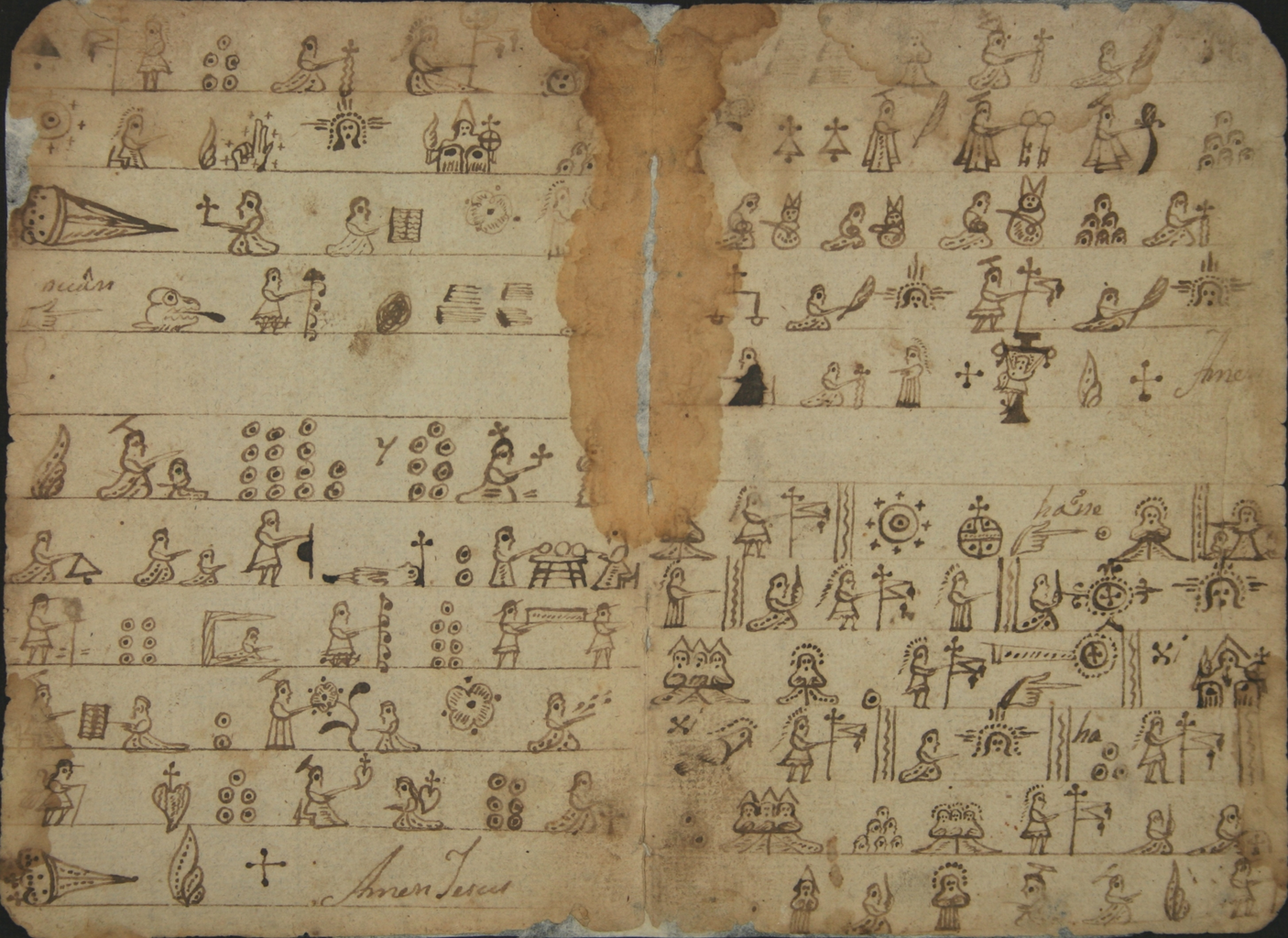

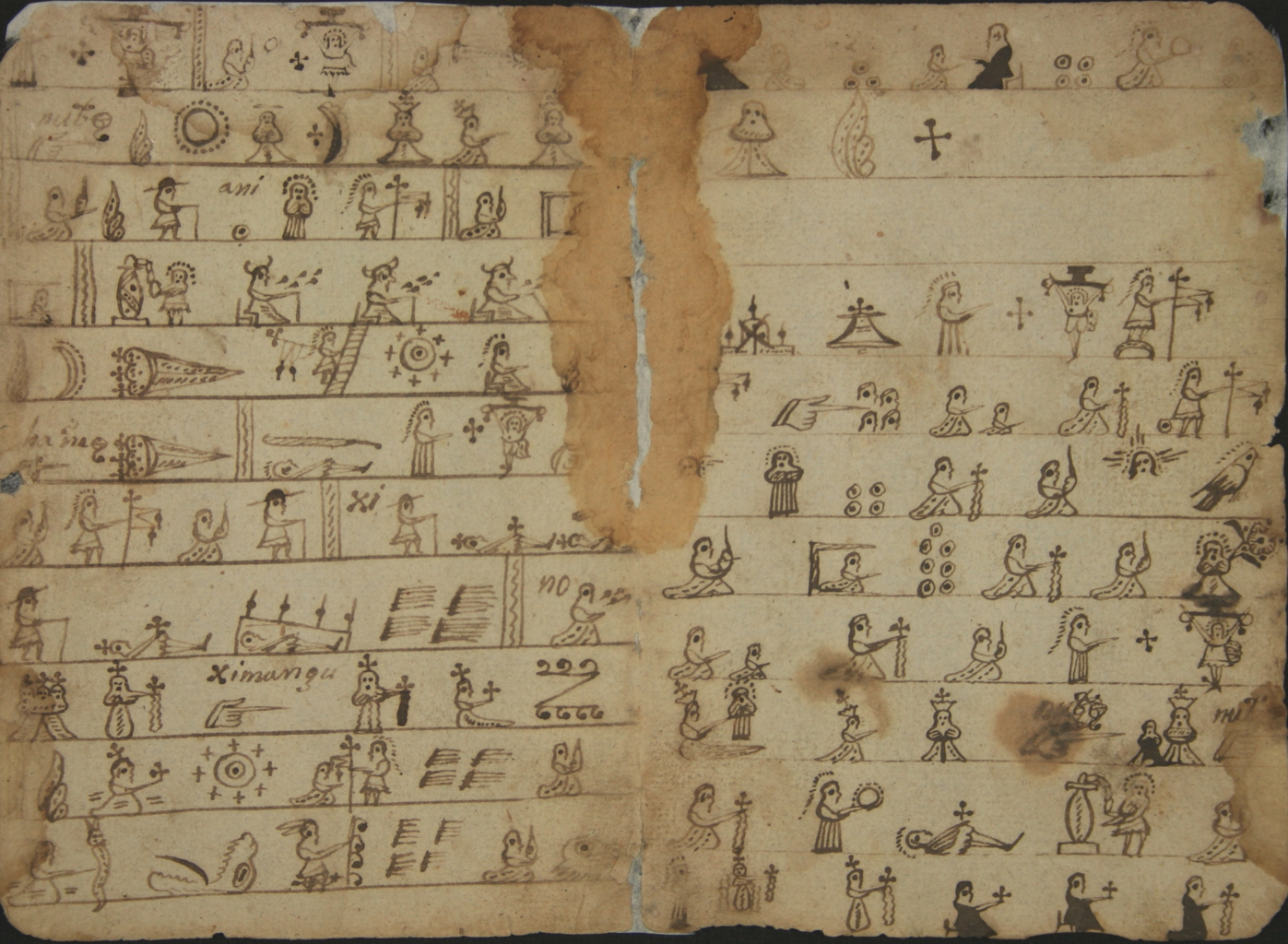

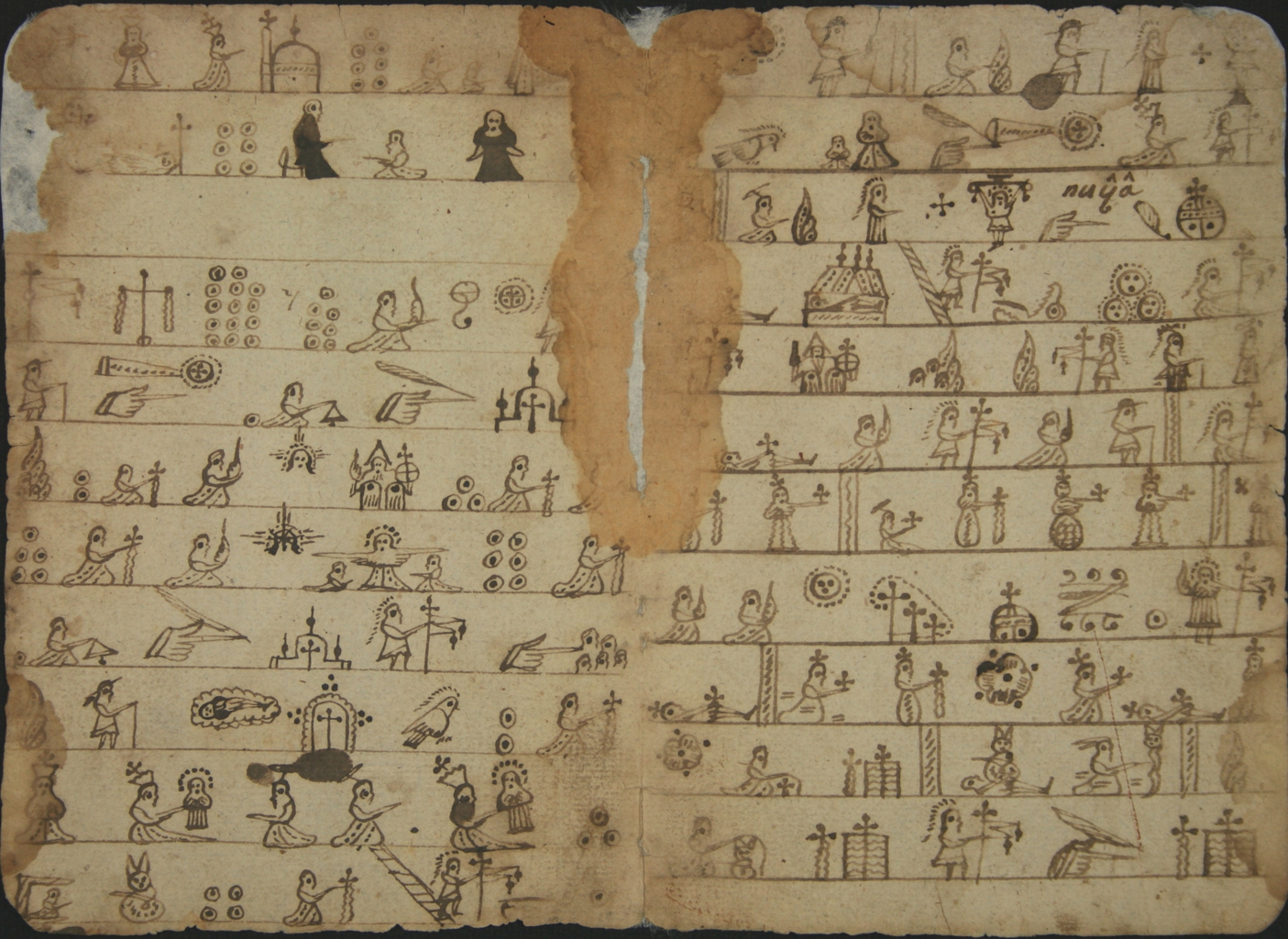

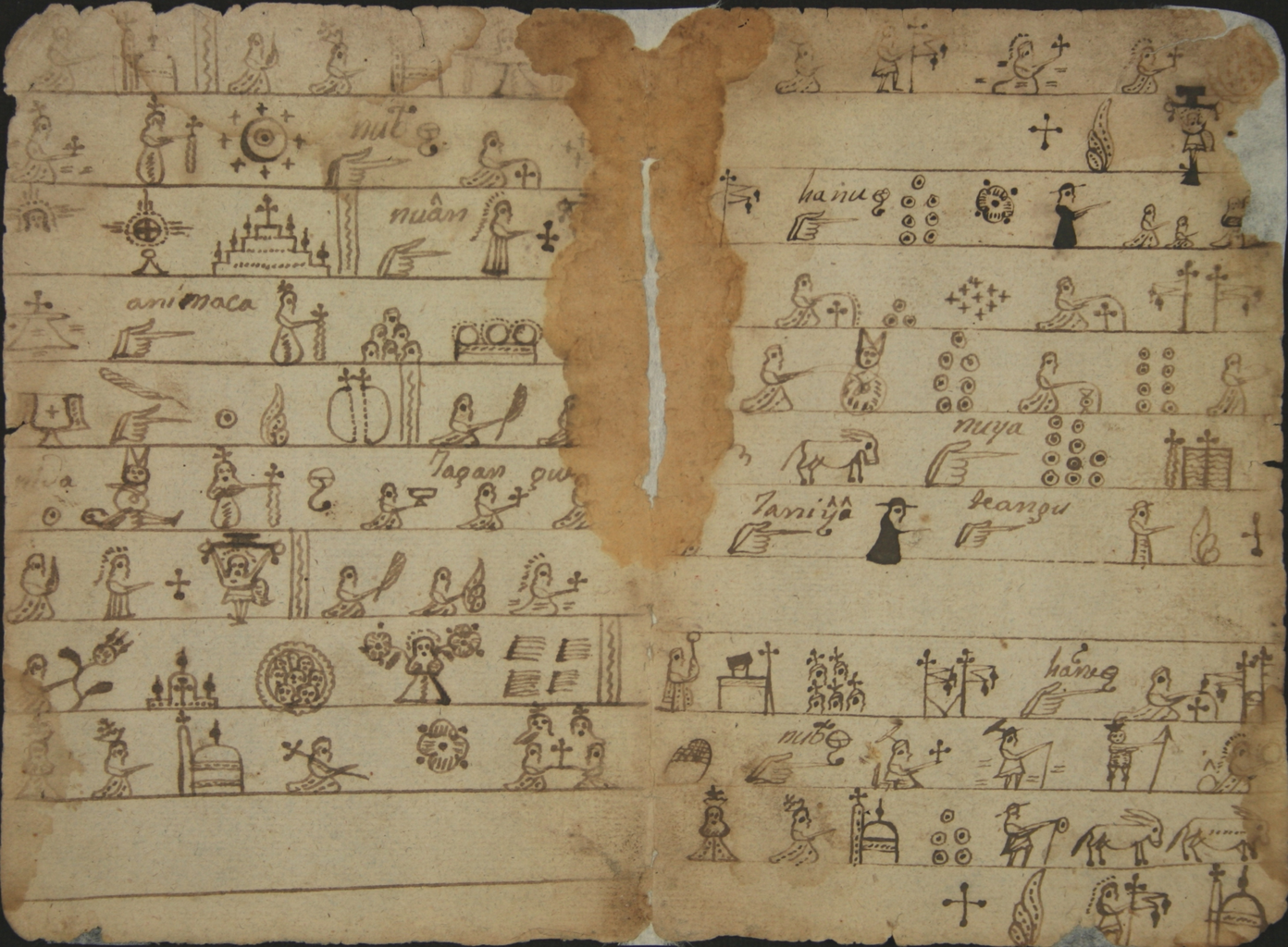

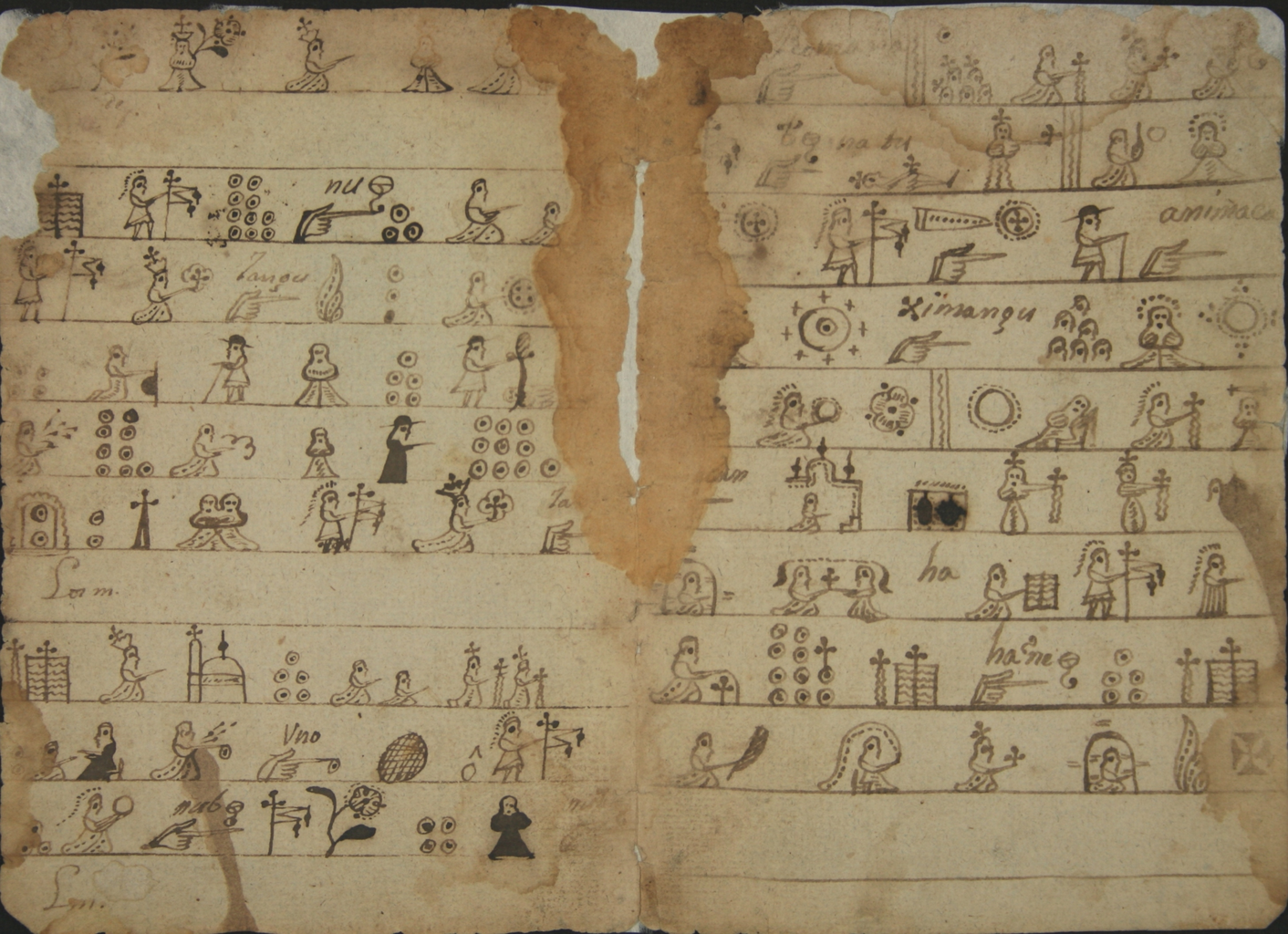

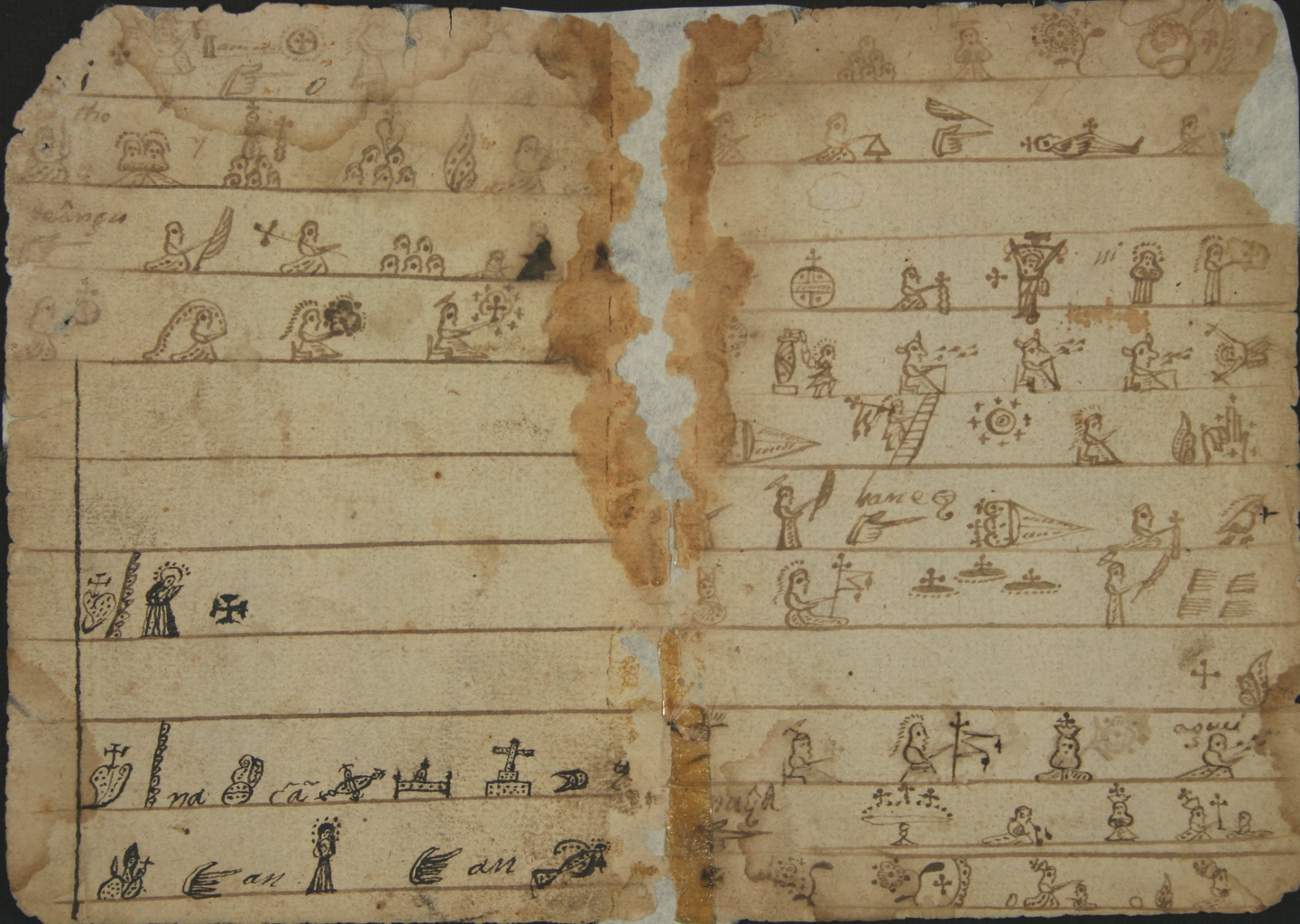
