= Cuacuauhtzin =

Aztec lord

- Born: c. 1410
- Died: 1443
- Cause of death: Killed in battle
- Title: Lord
- Spouse: Azcalxóchitzin

Cuacuauhtzin (c. 1410–1443) was an Aztec poet, composing in the Nahuatl language, and lord of Tepechpan. Born around the year 1410, Cuacuauhtzin became lord when his father, Tencoyotzin died at a young age.

As lord, he led his people to battle several times. The spoils from these exploits increased the prosperity of his town and were used to decorate his palace more lavishly.

After giving a large gift to an important Mexica named Temictzin, Cuacuauhtzin married that man's daughter, Azcalxóchitzin, in the year 12-Flint (1440). Because Azcalxóchitzin was so young, Cuacuauhtzin did not immediately consummate their marriage. After their marriage, Nezahualcoyotl, tlatoani of Texcoco, fell in love with Azcalxóchitzin and sent Cuacuauhtzin to the war against Tlaxcala. At Nezahualcoyotl's command, Cuacuauhtzin was ordered into the midst of the most dangerous fighting, so that he would be killed and Nezahualcoyotl could marry Azcalxóchitzin. Cuacuauhtzin found out this plot before he left for war and composed what is known as the "Song of Sadness" or "Sad Song." Addressed to a gathering of close friends, the poem deals with the betrayal of his lord and friend, Nezahualcoyotl, and the certainty of death: "Where would we go/that we never have to die?" He makes apostrophe to Nezahualcoyotl by means of an epithet, Yoyontzin or "Panting One".

He died in the year 3-Reed (1443) in battle against the Tlaxcalans. His biography is given by Ixlilxochitl. His songs appear in three different places in extant collections of pre-Columbian work.
