= Antonio Ricardo =

Italian printer

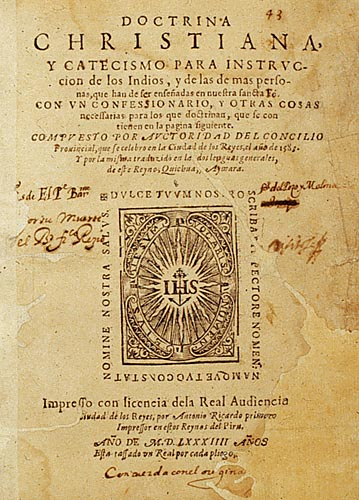
Title page of the Doctrina Christiana from 1585, the first book that was printed in South America, and the first printed book to have text in Quechua and Aymara

Antonio Ricciardi, better known as Antonio Ricardo (1532 – 1605/1606), was an Italian from Turin who became the first printer in South America and worked in Lima, Peru from 1584 until his death in 1605 or 1606.

== Biography ==
Antonio Ricciardi was born in Turin in 1532. His father Sebastiano Ricciardi came from Monticello d'Alba, and his mother Gigliani Pallodi was a native of Turin. He had a brother Pietro who lived in Venice. Ricciardi worked with the printer Gerolamo Farina in Turin. Afterwards he went to Venice and Lyon, where he met Pedro Ocharte, one of the earliest printers in Mexico. Together they traveled to Valladolid and Medina del Campo, where they worked with the printers Del Canto.

Ricardo emigrated to Mexico in presumably May 1570, where he worked in the shop of Pedro Ocharte. He also married Catalina Aguda in those years. He was a printer in Mexico City from 1577 to 1579, with his office in the San Pedro y San Pablo College of the Jesuits. In those three years, he printed at least twelve works, published in ten books.

He moved to Acapulco in March 1580 and from there moved on to Callao, on the Peruvian coast, in January 1581. From there he travelled to Lima. He left his wife behind in Mexico City, presumably to deal with his creditors: one of those was Pedro Ocharte, who had supplied him with the necessary equipment to set up his own printing office. For three years, he tried to get the necessary royal approval to become a printer: finally, on 13 February 1584, the Jesuits gave him the permission to start printing texts for them, without having received the royal approval yet.

The Third Council of Lima had ordered the production of a trilingual catechism in Spanish, Quechua and Aymara. Ricardo received the order, thereby becoming the first printer in South America, and he remained the only one until his death. He was granted official permission to set up a printing press in Lima from Philip II of Spain on 7 August 1584. The first publication ever printed in South America was a four-page leaflet with information about the new Gregorian calendar of 1582, which was immediately adopted by Spain, but which hadn't yet been communicated to the colonies. The next publication by Ricardo, and the first book ever printed in South America, was the Doctrina Christiana. Between 1584 and 1605, Ricardo would publish at least 40 works.

In 1605, Ricardo was summoned to appear before the Inquisition. The same year or the next year, he died. His office was taken over by Francisco del Canto, a son of the Del Cantos from Medina del Campo, who had worked in Ricardo's workshop previously and who would hold the monopoly on printing in Peru until 1619.

== Works published ==
=== In Mexico ===
- 1577: Emblemata by Andreas Alciatus
- 1577: Tristes by Ovid
- 1577: Sermonario en lengua Mexicana, together with Catechismo en lengua Mexicana y Española by Juan de la Anunciacion
- 1577: Doctrinalis fidei in mechuacanensium Indorum linguam, by Juan de Medina Plaza
- 1578: Vocabulario en lengua çapoteca, by Juan de Córdova
- 1578: Introductio in dialecticam Aristotelis, by Francisco de Toledo: published together with Reverendi do. Francisci Maurolyci, abbatis and Computus ecclesiasticus in summam collectus, by Francesco Maurolico
- 1578: Suma y Recopilacion de Cirugia, by Alonso Lopez de Hinojosos, the first text on surgery printed in the Americas
- 1579: De constructione octo partium orationis, by Manuel Álvares
- 1579: Tractado breve de anothomia y chirugia, by Agustín Farfán
- 1579: Carta, by Pedro de Morales

=== In Peru ===
- 1584: Pragmatica, a four-page edict on the new Gregorian calendar, probably the first work printed in South America
- 1584: Doctrina Christiana y catecismo para instruccion de los Indios, the first book printed in South America, and the first printed book with text in Quechua and Aymara
- 1585: Tercero cathecismo y exposicion de la doctrina christiana, por sermones
- 1585: Confessionario para los curas de Indios
- 1585: Critica de Aristoteles by José de Acosta
- 1586: Arte, y vocabulario en la lengua general del Peru, llamada Quichua (reprinted 1603, 1604 and 1614)
- 1586: Un libro de oraciones by Alonso de Barzana
- 1596: Primero Parte del Arauco Domado by Pedro de Oña, first impression of the best known work of Chile's first poet
- 1597: Libro general delas reduciones de plata, by Joan de Belveder
- 1598: Symbolico Catholico Indiano, by Geronimo de Ore
- 1601: Constituciones de los F. Menores desta Provincia delos doze Apostoles del Piru
- 1602: Primera parte de la miscelanea austral by Diego Dávalos Figueroa
- 1602: Constituciones y ordenanças de la Universidad, y Studio General de la Ciudad de los Reyes del Piru
- 1603: Curia filipica, by Juan de Hevia Bolaño
- 1604: Tratado y parcero sobre el servicio personal de los Indios del Peru, by Miguel de Agia
- 1606: Commentarii ac quaestiones in universam Aristotelis ac subtilissimi doctoris Jhoannis Duns Scoti logicam by Jéronimo Valera
