= Juan Pablos =

Italian printer in Mexico

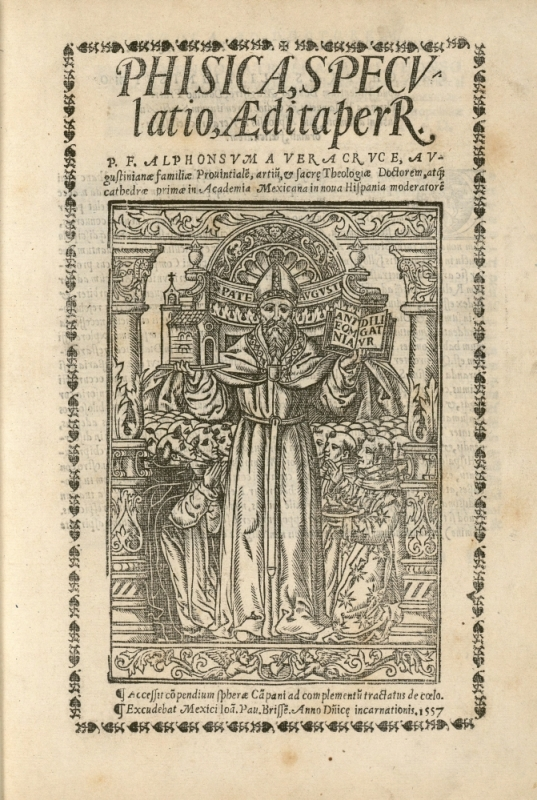
Title page of the Phisica speculatio, published in 1557

Giovanni Paoli, better known as Juan Pablos (1500?–1560 or 1561), a native of Lombardy, was the first documented printer in the Americas when he started printing in Mexico in 1539.

== Biography ==
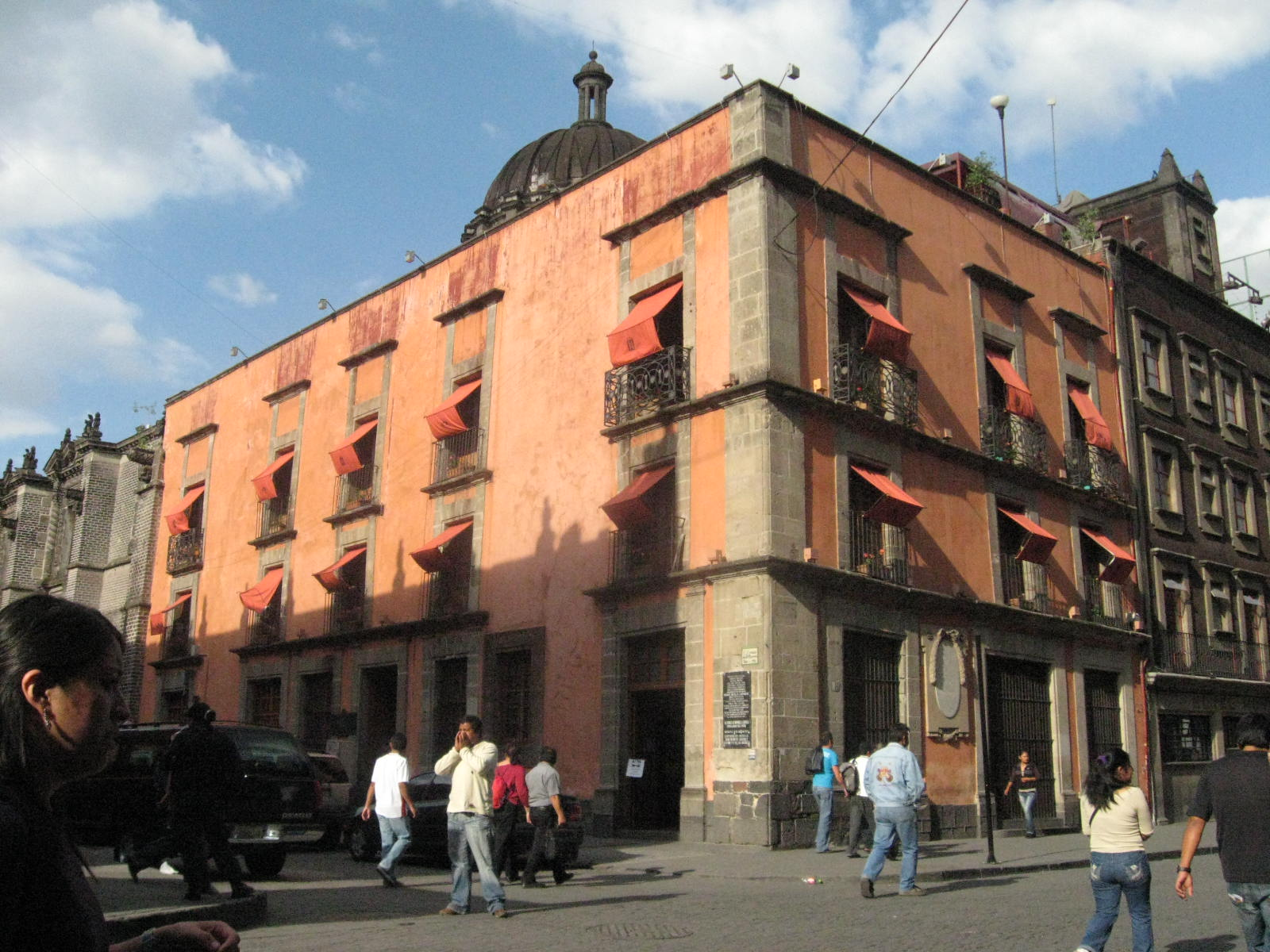
Casa de Juan Cromberger in Mexico City, the location of the first printing press in the Americas

Giovanni Paoli was born in the region of Brescia around 1500. He may have been trained in the same school as Aldus Manutius, but apart from that, nothing is known about his early years. In 1536, Juan Cromberger wanted to establish a printing house in Mexico and sent Juan Pablos to Mexico City. Pablos departed from Seville on 12 June 1539 and arrived in October 1539, when he set up the company in the "casa de Juan Cromberger". Cromberger's name also appeared on all early publications in Mexico until 1545 even though he never visited Mexico and died in 1540.

The first known book to be published in the Americas was the 1539 edition of the Breve y mas compendiosa doctrina Christiana en lengua Mexicana y Castellana by Juan de Zumárraga. Juan Pablos obtained the necessary patents and permissions to continue Cromberger's workshop as his own after the death of Cromberger in 1540, until his own death in 1560 or 1561, when he had printed at least 37 books. Pablos trained and employed the next generation of Mexican printers, including Pedro Ocharte, who was also his son-in-law, and Antonio de Espinosa, who started working with Pablos in 1554. Espinosa became the second printer in Mexico, in 1559.

Juan Pablos was married to Geronima Gutierrez, who received the viceroyal printing privilege after his death. Their daughter Maria de Figueroa married Pedro Ocharte in 1561 or 1562, and they took over the company from Gutierrez in 1563.

== Works published ==
- 1539: Breve y mas compendiosa doctrina Christiana en lengua Mexicana y Castellana by Juan de Zumárraga, a text in Spanish and Nahuatl (multiple editions)
- 1540: Manual de Adultos
- 1541: Relacion del espantable terremoto, a report on the 10 September 1541 earthquake that destroyed Guatemala City
- 1543: Doctrina breve muy provechosa by Juan de Zumárraga, intended for children
- 1544: Tripartito del Christianissimo y consolatorio doctor Juan Gerson, first Mexican book with woodcut illustrations
- 1544: Compedio breve (2 editions)
- 1544: Doctrina christiana (multiple editions)
- 1546: Cancienore Spiritual, the first book to carry the name of Juan Pablos instead of Juan Cromberger
- 1547: Regle Christiana breve
- 1547: Nuevo Vergel by Diego Bernal
- 1548: Ordenaças y copilacion de leyes
- 1548: Doctrina Christiana en lengua Huasteca by Diego de Guevara
- 1548: Nueva Espana. Legislacion by Antonio de Mendoza
- 1549: Copilacion breve de un tratado que se llama Mistica theologia by Saint Bonaventura
- 1550: Doctrina Christiana en lengua Mixteca by Benito Fernandez (reprinted three times)
- 1554: Recognitio. Summularum reverendi patri Ildephonsi by Alonso Gutiérrez
- 1554: Dialectica Resolutio cum textu Aristotelis
- 1554: Exercitationes linguae latinae by Francisco Cervantes de Salazar, a commentary of Juan Luis Vives’s Linguae Latinae exercitatio or Dialogues with seven original dialogues by Salazar: Saltus, Ludus spherae per anulum ferreum, Obeliscorum sive lignearum pyramidularum ludus, Pilae palmariae ludus, Academia Mexicana, Civitas Mexicus interior, and Mexicus exterior
- 1554: Vives by Francisco Cervantes de Salazar
- 1555: Vocabulario en lengua castellana y mexicana by Alonso de Molina
- 1556: Sumario Compendioso by Juan Diez, the first non-religious scientific book to be published outside Europe
- 1556: Costituciones del arzobiscopado y provincia de la muy insigne y muy leal ciudad de Tenuxtitlan Mexico de la Nueva Espana
- 1556: Costituciones Fratruum Heremitarum sancti patris nostri Augustini Hiponensis episcopi et doctoris ecclesiae together with the Ordinarium sacri ordinis heremitaru by Diego de Vertauillo and the Regula: the Ordinarium (80 pages) was the first book of music printed in the Americas
- 1556: Speculum Conjugiorum by Alonso Gutiérrez
- 1556: Catecismo y doctrina Christiana en idioma Utlateco by Francisco Marroquín
- 1557: Physica speculatio by Alonso Gutiérrez
- 1559: Dialogo de doctrina cristiana, Vocabulario and Thesoro spiritual, all three by Maturino Gilberti in lengua de Mechuacan
- 1560: Manuale Sacramentorum, the last work published by Pablos, 354 pages.
