= Pedro Ocharte =

Pedro Ocharte was one of the first printers in the Americas, active from 1563 to 1592.

== Life and career ==
Originally from Rouen in France, Ocharte came to the City of Mexico in New Spain around 1549. He married Maria de Figueroa, the daughter of printer Juan Pablos, and in 1563 took over the operation of Pablos's press. In 1572, Ocharte was imprisoned by the Inquisition, as one of his prints was considered heretical. Ocharte died around 1592.

Ocharte's son Melchior Ocharte was also a printer.

== Books printed by Pedro Ocharte ==
- Psalterium chorale (1563)
- "Provisiones, cédulas e instrucciones de Su Majestad, México (1563).
- Doctrina christiana breve y compendio por via de dialogo entre un maestro y un discipulo, sacada en lengua castellana y mexicana (1565) by Domingo de la Anunciación
- Cartilla para enseñar a leer (1569)
- Arte de la lengua mexicana y castellana (1571) by Alonso de Molina
- Doctrina christiana en lengua guasteca (1571) by Juan de la Cruz
- Arte en lengua zapoteca (1578) by Juan de Cordova
- Colloquios de la paz y tranquilidad christiana en lengua mexicana (1582)
- Dialogos militares (1583) by Diego García de Palacio
- Psalterium, antiphonarium sanctorale cum psalmis & hymnis (1584)
- Instrucion nauthica (1587) by Diego García de Palacio
- Problemas y secretos maravillosos de las Indias (1591) by Juan de Cárdenas
- Tractado breve de medicina y de todas las enfermedades (1592) by Agustín Farfán

== See also ==
- Antonio de Espinosa
