= María de Córdoba =

María de Córdoba (1597–1678), was a Spanish stage actress, known as Amarilis la bella and la sultana Amarilis.

She was a famous and popular diva of her era. She was celebrated in poems, songs, and writings by artists such as Pedro de Morales, Guillen de Castro, and Francisco de Quevedo, and was also involved in conflicts with members of the nobility because of her position as a favorite artist of the royal court.
