= Salmanticenses and Complutenses =

Salmanticenses and Complutenses are the Latin names (after episcopal sees) designating the Spanish Catholic authors of the courses of Scholastic philosophy and theology, and of moral theology published by the lecturers of the philosophical college of the Discalced Carmelites at Alcalá de Henares, and of the theological college at Salamanca.

== History ==
Although primarily intended for the instruction of the younger members of the order, these colleges, being incorporated in the Universities of Alcalá (Complutum in Latin) and Salamanca, opened their lecture rooms also to outsiders. During the Middle Ages the Carmelites, with some notable exceptions, had gone hand in hand with the Dominicans in the matter of Scholastic teaching as against the Franciscan and Augustinian schools; it was therefore natural that in the sixteenth century they should maintain their old allegiance as against the Jesuits. Consequently, they made strict adherence to Thomism their fundamental principle, and carried it out with greater consistency than probably any other commentators of the neo-Scholastic period.

Although the names of the several contributors to the three courses are on record, their works must not be taken as the views or utterances of individual scholars, but as the expression of the official teaching of the order, for no question was finally disposed of without being submitted to the discussion of the whole college, and in case of difference of opinions the matter was decided by vote. By this means such uniformity and consistency were obtained that it could be claimed that there was not a single contradiction in any of these immense works, although nearly a century elapsed between the publication of the first and the appearance of the final instalment.

At the beginning the lecturers contented themselves with writing their quaterniones, many of which are still extant, but at the beginning of the seventeenth century the publication of a complete course was decided upon. The "Logic", written by Diego de Jesus (born at Granada, 1570; died at Toledo, 1621) appeared at Madrid, 1608, and was re-written by Miguel de la SS. Trinidad (b. at Granada, 1588; d. at Alcalá 1661), in which form it was frequently printed in Spain, France and Germany. Nearly all the remaining philosophical treatises were the work of Antonio de la Madre de Dios (b. at Léon, 1588; d. 1640). The whole work was then re-cast by Juan de la Anunciación (b. at Oviedo, 1633; general superior from 1694 to 1700; d. 1701), who also added a supplement. It appeared at Lyon in 1670 in five quarto volumes, under the title "Collegii Complutensis Fr. Discalc. B. M. V. de Monte Carmeli Artium cursus ad breviorem formam collectus et novo ordine atque faciliori stylo dispositus". It superseded all previous editions and various supplements, such as the "Metaphysica in tres lib. distincta" (Paris, 1640) by the French Carmelite Blasius à Conceptione. Antonio de la Madre de Dios laid the foundation of the dogmatic part of the Salmanticenses by publishing, in 1630, two volumes containing the treatises "De Deo uno", "De Trinitate", and "De angelis".

He was succeeded by Domingo de Santa Teresa (b. at Alberca, 1600; d. at Madrid, 1654), who wrote in 1647 "De ultimo fine", "De beatitudine, etc.", and "De peccatis". Juan de la Anunciación, already mentioned, contributed "De gratia", "De justificatione et merito", "De virtutibus theologicis", "De Incarnatione", "De sacramentis in communi" and "De Eucharistia". He left the first volume of "De poenitentia" in manuscript. It was revised and continued by Antonio de S. Juan-Bautista, who, dying at Salamanca in 1699, was unable to carry it through the press. The work was therefore completed by Alonso de los Angeles (d. 1724) and Francisco de Sta Ana (d. at Salamanca, 1707). This last volume, the twelfth, appeared in 1704. The Salmanticenses have ever been held in the highest esteem, particularly at Rome where they are considered a standard work on Thomistic scholasticism. A new edition, in twenty volumes appeared in Paris as late as 1870-83. An abridgment (two large volumes, in folio) for the use of students was published by Pablo de la Concepcion (general from 1724 to 1730; d. at Granada, 1734).

The moral theology of the Salmanticenses was begun in 1665 by Francisco de Jesus-Maria (d. 1677), with treatises on the sacraments in general, baptism, confirmation, the Eucharist and extreme unction. The fourth edition (Madrid, 1709) underwent considerable revision on account of the new Decrees of popes Innocent XI and Alexander VII. It was augmented by a disquisition on the "Bull Cruciata" of José de Jesús-Maria, published by Antonio del SS. Sagramento. Andrés de la Madre de Dios (d. 1674) wrote "De sacramento ordinis et matrimonii" (Salamanca, 1668), "De censuris", "De justitia" and "De statu religioso", with all cognate matters. Sebastian de San Joaquin (d. 1714), the author of two volumes on the Ten Commandments, did not live to see his work through the press. Hence it was completed and published by Alonso de los Angeles, who had also put the last hand to the course of dogmatic theology.

St. Alphonsus Liguori esteemed the moral theology of the Salmanticenses; he nearly always quotes them approvingly and follows their lead, though on rare occasions he finds them somewhat too easy going. Lehmkuhl complains that they are not always accurate in their quotations.
