= Arte de la lengua mexicana y castellana =

1571 grammar of Nahuatl by Alonso de Molina

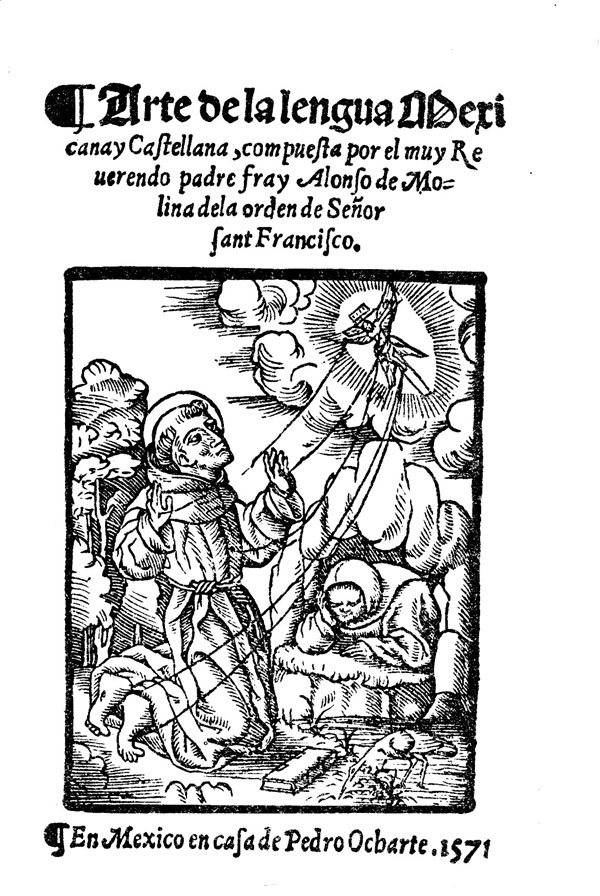
- Author: Alonso de Molina
- Language: Spanish
- Subject: Nahuatl language
- Publisher: Pedro Ocharte
- Publication date: 1571
- Publication place: Mexico

The Arte de la lengua mexicana y castellana is a grammar of the Nahuatl language in Spanish by Alonso de Molina. It was published in Mexico in 1571, the same year as his monumental dictionary, Vocabulario en lengua castellana y mexicana.

The grammar is rudimentary, but does contain some insights on certain points, especially on pronunciation and orthography.

The Arte was republished in a facsimile edition in 1945.
