= Pedro Morales (disambiguation) =

Pedro Morales (1942−2019) was a Puerto Rican professional wrestler.

Pedro Morales may also refer to:

- Pedro de Morales (1538−1614), religious writer
- Pedro Morales (footballer) (born 1985), Chilean football player
- Pedro Morales y Mercado (fl. 17th century), Spanish emigrant, mayor of Buenos Aires
- Pedro Morales Pino (1863–1926), Colombian bandleader and painter
- Pedro Morales Torres (1932–2000), Chilean football manager
- Pedro Morales Vivanco (fl. 1930s), Chilean politician
- Pedro Saúl Morales (1959–2021), Colombian racing cyclist
