= Physica speculatio =

Book by Alonso Gutiérrez

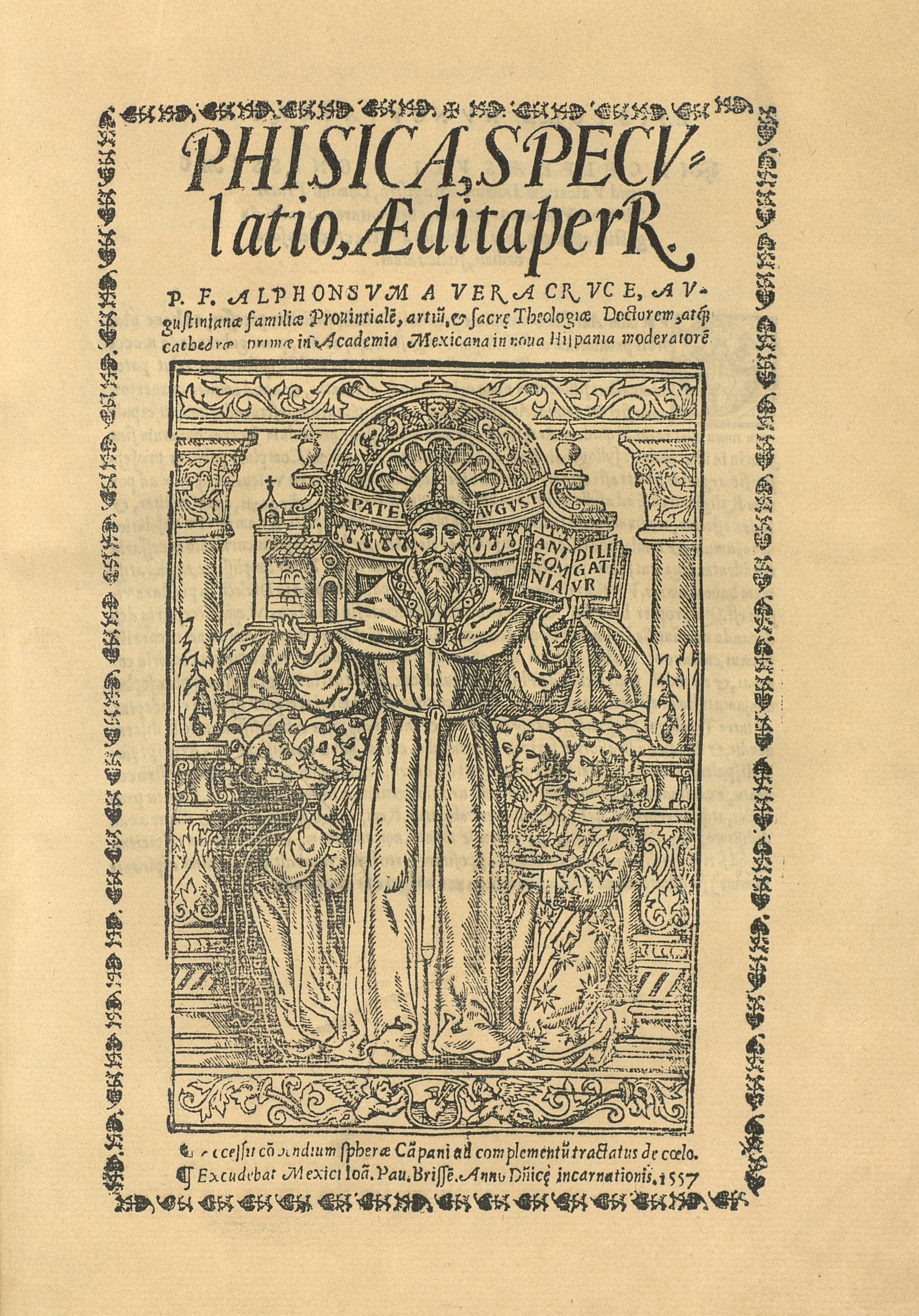
- Author: Alonso de la Vera Cruz
- Language: Latin
- Subject: Science
- Publication date: 1557
- Publication place: Mexico

Physica speculatio is a text of scientific character written by Alonso de la Vera Cruz in 1557 in the capital of New Spain. It was the first published work in the American continent that specifically addressed the study of physics, and was written to teach the students of the Real University of Mexico.

It introduced the main theoretical concepts of geocentric astronomy and references the heliocentric model.

Fray Alonso de la Vera Cruz published in the capital of New Spain a Course of Arts, constituted in three volumes in Latin. The first form in 1553 under the title of Recognitio Summularum, that had like purpose help to the students of the Real University of Mexico to understand the philosophy by means of the understanding of the formal logic. A year afterwards appeared the second called Dialectica Resolutio, that was a continuation of the previous. The last was Physica speculatio.

They did four editions, the last 3 of which were for use of the salmantino students and were abbreviated versions of the Mexican one.

== Subjects ==
The Physica speculatio has by object the study or "investigation" -speculatio- and the exhibition, in general, of subjects of physics on the nature -Physica-, treated by fray Alonso de la Vera Cruz basically from the philosophical perspective, characteristic of Aristotle and traditional in the Half Age.

It talks about, in what can be considered like the first part, the subjects treated by Aristotle in the Eight books of physics, as they are the essence of the physical or natural being, the movement and the infinite, the extension, the continuous, the space, the time, the first engine, etc. The second part treats of the subjects of the generation and the corruption of the living beings, of the mixed and composed being, of the primary qualities and of the elements and their properties. In the third part it exposes the doctrines on the meteors, it talks about the stars and their influence on humans, of the three regions of the air or atmosphere, of the comets, of the tides, of the ray and of a lot of other atmospheric phenomena. The fourth part devotes fray Alonso to comment the books De Anima by Aristotle. To end the Physica speculatio, there are some reflections on the treatise De Caelo by Aristotle.

== Formal characteristics ==
It consists of 400 pages in paper, in which there are two columns that form 900 sheets in current transcription and nearly 1200 in translation to the Spanish.

It contains the following writings:

- Eight books of physics;
- On Generation and Corruption;
- On the meteors;
- On the soul;
- On the sky.

Titled exactly like the Aristotelian works.

It contains added as appendix the Tractatus de Sphera written by the Italian mathematician and astronomer Campanus of Novara in the 13th century, and printed for the first time in 1518.

== Structure and form ==
The main divisions in Books are in general the ones of the corresponding works of Aristotle.

Each book is divided in Speculations (particular studies), that can be understood as chapters.

The writing is presented according to the scholastic method, proposing first the opinions or negative affirmations, contrary to the thesis that it will sustain, and afterwards the positive, with foundations and explanations.
