= House of the First Print Shop in the Americas =

Building in Mexico City, Mexico

House of the First Printing Press in the Americas
- Casa de la Primera Imprenta de América
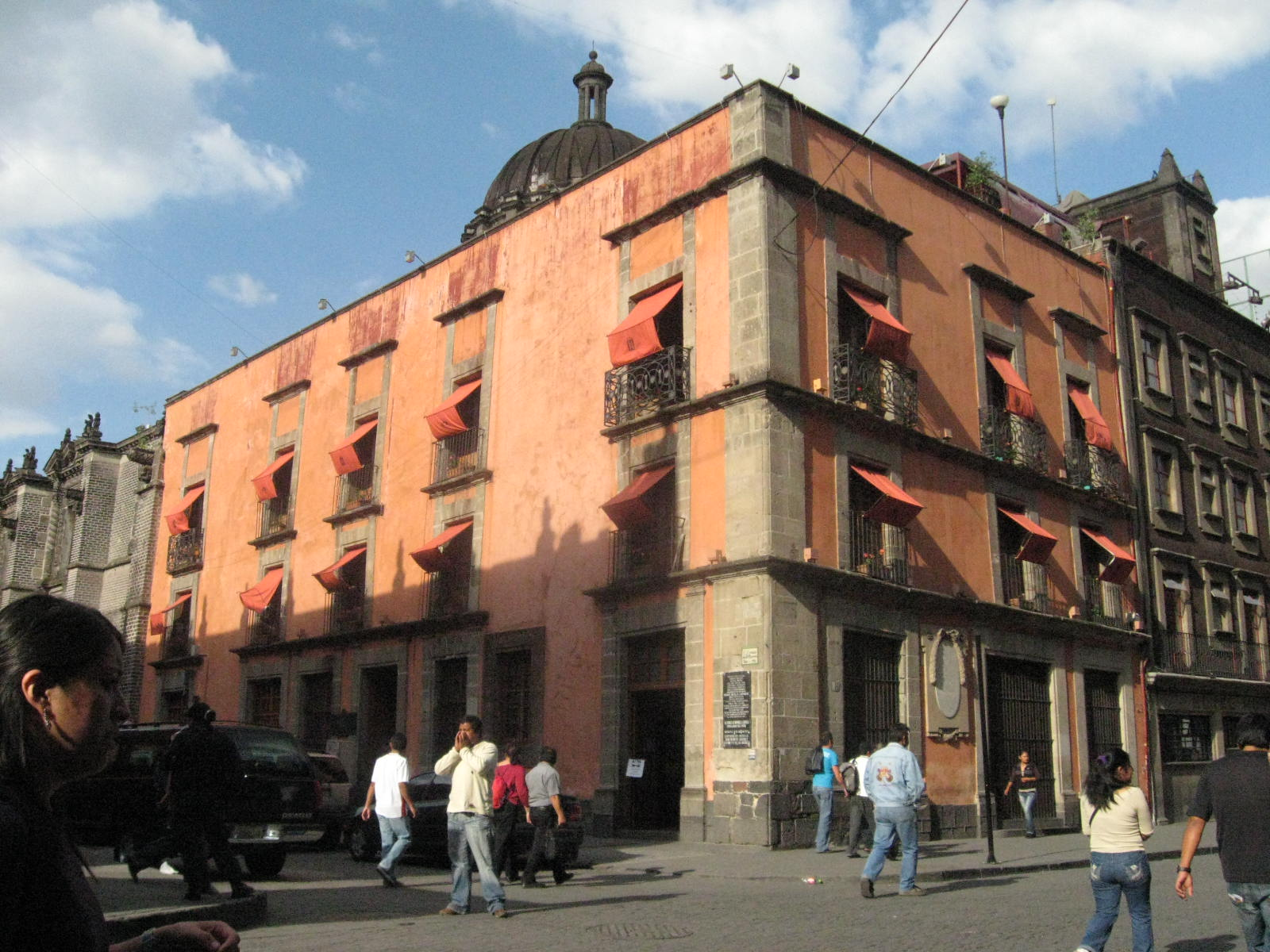
- The house in 2008

General information
- Location: Mexico City, Mexico
- Completed: 1524
- Owner: Universidad Autónoma Metropolitana

The House of the First Printing Press in the Americas (Spanish: Casa de la Primera Imprenta de América) at the corner of Moneda and Licenciado Primo Verdad streets in Mexico City was the home of the first printing press/print shop in the New World. The printer Juan Pablos oversaw the printing of at least 35 books at this print shop between 1539, the date of the first book printed in the Americas, and his death in 1560.

The house was originally constructed by Gerónimo de Aguilar in 1524 and is located on the outer edge of what was the sacred precinct of the Templo Mayor prior to the Conquest.

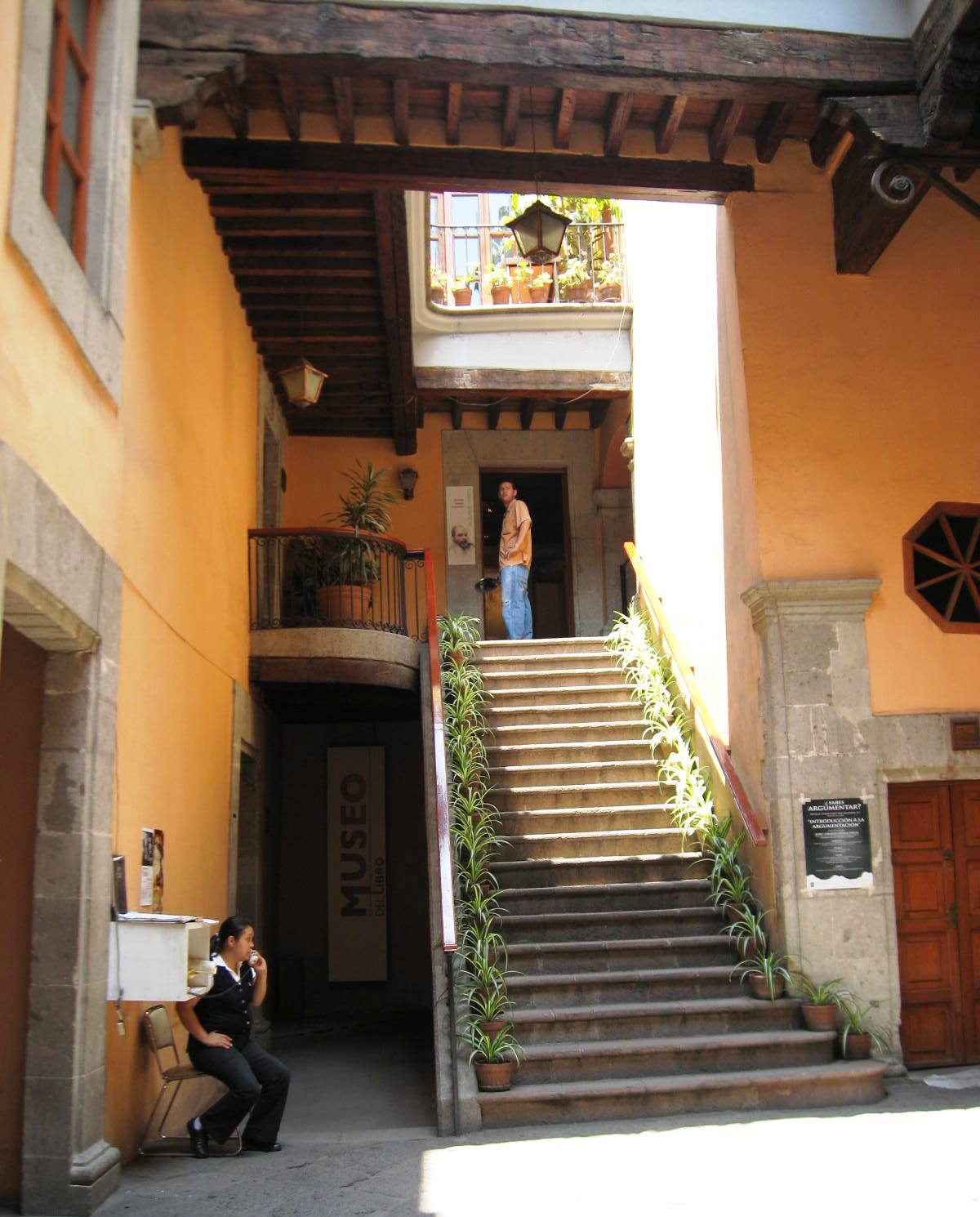
Patio area

After receiving permission from Spanish king Carlos V and the archbishop of Mexico City, Juan de Zumárraga had a printing press brought from Europe in 1539. The press was set up in this house, then called the "Casa de las Campanas" (House of the Bells) by the Seville-based publisher Juan Cromberger with Italian printer Juan Pablos who worked for living expenses for ten years. They began printing viceregal- and Church-related documents. One of these documents was a catechism entitled Breve y más compendiosa doctrina christiana en lengua mexicana y castellana ("The Brief and Most Concise Christian Doctrine in the Mexican Language") written by the archbishop himself.

After its stint as a print shop, the house changed hands numerous times and was used for a number of purposes. In the 17th century, it belonged to the Monastery of Santa Teresa de la Orden de las Carmelas Reformadas and later, in the 18th century, it belonged to the Royal Military Order of Nuestra Señora de la Merced Redención de Cautivos de la Ciudad de México. In 1847, U.S. troops occupied the house, destroying the archives that were within. The house was then owned by a number of civilians, including one who used the building to store furniture. In the 20th century, the building was mostly used for offices, including being the home to a paper and printing services operation called the "Imprenta y Papelería Militar 'Marte'." The house continued to change hands until 1989, when the Universidad Autónoma Metropolitana (UAM) bought the house with the intention of restoring it.

UAM worked with the Historic Center Restoration Program, working with the Instituto Nacional de Antropología. About 82 cm below the surface of the ground floor the stone head of a serpent from Aztec times was discovered. It is possible that this head was visible to the occupants of the building in the 16th and 17th centuries.

Today, the house serves as the Continuing Education Center for UAM with various exhibition rooms, a bookstore and facilities for conferences and courses. In 2008, the Book Museum opened here, with some of the oldest books in Mexico on display.
