= Nahuatl orthography =

Writing system of a Uto-Aztecan language

Since the early 16th century, Nahuatl has been written in an orthography in Latin script based on Spanish spelling conventions, with overall the same values for letters in both orthographies. Over the centuries, Latin script was utilized to record a large body of Nahuatl prose and poetry, which somewhat mitigated the devastating loss of the thousands of Aztec manuscripts that were burned by Spanish missionaries.

Printed and manuscript texts in Nahuatl generally display a lot of orthographical variety, as there was no official institution that developed and promoted a standard. The spelling as used in ecclesiastical circles between 1570 and 1650 showed the highest degree of stability, and this spelling, and the language variety written in it, are considered "classical".

A new orthography was introduced in 1950 in the weekly magazine Mexicatl Itonalama. This orthography is currently used to write some of the modern Nahuatl dialects.

== Periodisation ==
The development of Nahuatl orthography was analyzed and described by the American historian and linguist James Lockhart. He divides the development of Nahuatl orthography into three stages:

- Stage 1, the early stage of experimentation, characterised by much variety in the representation of some phonemes; for example, /ˈiːwaːn/ "and, also" can be written as ihuan, yhuan, iuan, juan, yuan, ivan, jvan, yvan, ihoan, jhuan, yhoan, ioan, joan or yoan.
- Stage 2, starting around 1570 when a more or less standardised European orthography emerged, which showed "great stability as practiced in ecclesiastical circles"; this stage is considered the classical period of Nahuatl.
- Stage 3, from 1650 onward, which saw the production of large amounts of "mundane" (i.e. non-religious or ecclesiastical) texts by native scribes.

== Classical Nahuatl orthography ==
The standard or "classical" orthography was established in the second half of the 16th century. It represents the phonemes of Nahuatl as follows.

=== Vowels ===
The four vowels are written a, e, i, o. The phonemic contrast between short and long vowels is left unmarked.

=== Consonants ===
The stops /p/ and /t/, the nasals /m/ and /n/, and the approximants /l/ and /j/ are written in a straightforward manner (the right-hand column shows the spelling in syllable-final position):

	/a(ː)/	/e(ː)/	/i(ː)/	/o(ː)/	/∅/
/p/	pa	pe	pi	po	-p
/t/	ta	te	ti	to	-t
/m/	ma	me	mi	mo	-m
/n/	na	ne	ni	no	-n
/l/	la	le	li	lo	-l
/j/	ya	ye	yi	yo	

The nasal /n/ becomes [m] before a labial consonant, and may then be written m. Conversely, the nasal /m/ becomes [n] before a dental consonant, and is then written n. In addition, both /n/ and /m/ are realised as [ɲ] before alveopalatal consonants, and as [ŋ] before velars; they are then written n, as in cōnchīhua [koːn̥ˈt͡ʃiːwa] "he's going to do it", oncochi [oŋˈkot͡ʃi] "he sleeps too late".

The spelling ll represents geminated /l/, not palatal /ʎ/ or /j/ as in Spanish; for example, calli "house" is /ˈkalːi/, not */kaʎi/.

The semivowel y /j/ does not occur in syllable-final position, where it changes to /ʃ/ or /s/.

The affricates /tʃ/ and /tɬ/ and the approximant /w/ are written with the digraphs ch, tl, and hu:

	/a(ː)/	/e(ː)/	/i(ː)/	/o(ː)/	/∅/
/tʃ/	cha	che	chi	cho	-ch
/tɬ/	tla	tle	tli	tlo	-tl
/w/	hua	hue	hui		-uh

The /w/ does not occur before the vowel /o/, so the spelling huo does not exist. Syllable-final /w/ is most often written with the digraph hu reversed to uh, as in teuhtli /tewtɬi/ "sand, dust".

As in Spanish, the stop /k/ is written c before /a, o/ and syllable-finally, and qu before /i, e/. Labialized /kʷ/ is written qu before /a/, while before /e/ and /i/ it is written cu, since qu is used to write plain /k/ before /e, i/; thus quiquaque /kiˈkʷaːkeˀ/ "they ate it".

	/a(ː)/	/e(ː)/	/i(ː)/	/o(ː)/	/∅/
/k/	ca	que	qui	co	-c
/kʷ/	qua	cue	cui		-cuh

Labialized /kʷ/ does not occur before /o/, hence the spellings quo or cuo do not exist. Syllable-final /kʷ/ is most often written cuh, but it can also be written cu or uc, as in tecuhtli, tecutli or teuctli /teːˈkʷt͡ɬi/ "lord".

The spelling chua seemingly contains the digraph ch, which is used to write /tʃ/, but in fact represents the pronunciations /k.wa(ː)/ (syllable-final /k/ followed by /wa(ː)/, as in nichualitta /nik.wa:.lit.ta/ "I'm coming to see it". The spelling chua /k.wa(ː)/ is thus distinct from qua /kʷa(ː)/, while /tʃ.wa(ː)/ is spelled chhua as in michhua /mit͡ʃwaʔ/ "fisherman".

The dental fricative /s/ is written c before /e, i/, ç before /a, o/, and z syllable-finally. The affricate /t͡s/ is written tz in all positions, and the palatal fricative /ʃ/ is written x in all positions.

	/a(ː)/	/e(ː)/	/i(ː)/	/o(ː)/	/∅/
/s/	ça	ce	ci	ço	-z
/ts/	tza	tze	tzi	tzo	-tz
/ʃ/	xa	xe	xi	xo	-x

The choice for c, ç and z to represent /s/ instead of simple s was dictated by the pronunciation of Spanish sibilants in the 16th century, which was different from modern pronunciation. At that time the graph s, as used in Spanish orthography, represented an apico-alveolar sibilant, which was perceived by speakers of Nahuatl as being close to /ʃ/. The graphs c (before /e, i/), ç (before /a, o/) and z on the other hand represented a dental sibilant in 16th-century Spanish, and were therefore adopted in Nahuatl orthography to write dental /s/.

The letter x represented /ʃ/ in 16th-century Spanish as well. Thus the name of Cervantes’ famous fictional character was pronounced /dɔn kiʃɔtɛ/ and written as Don Quixote in the 16th century, with the letter x representing /ʃ/.

The letters b, d, f, g, j, r, s, and v are not needed for the writing of native Nahuatl words, but they can be used in the spelling of Spanish loanwords. However, the spelling of loanwords often reflects their (complete or partial) assimilation to Nahuatl phonology, for example lexitol /leʃitol/ from Spanish regidor "councilman"

=== Vowel length and glottal stop ===
In most classical Nahuatl texts, printed as well as manuscript, short and long vowels are not distinguished, and the glottal stop /ʔ/ or "saltillo" is not represented. This underrepresentation apparently did not seriously affect legibility.

In his Arte de la Lengua Mexicana (1645), the priest and grammarian Horacio Carochi aimed to provide a full representation of all phonemically relevant features of Nahuatl. He therefore used the macron to mark long vowels (ā, ē, ī, ō), for example tōtōpīl /toːˈtoːpiːl/ "little bird". He also marked the presence of word-internal glottal stop with a grave accent on the preceding vowel letter (à, è, ì, ò), and word-final glottal stop with a circumflex on the preceding vowel letter (â, ê, î, ô), for example tlàcuilô /tɬaʔˈkʷiloo̥/ "scribe, painter". Since long vowels do not occur before glottal stop, the "stacking" of two diacritics on a vowel letter was not necessary.

Carochi's innovations were subsequently used by some fellow-Jesuit authors, but they never gained wide currency. The French linguist Michel Launey used Carochi's notation of glottal stop in his grammars (1994, 2011) and other publications.

Word-internal glottal stop was occasionally written with the letter h, notably by the 16th-century lexicographer Alonso de Molina, for example tlahca /tɬaʔˈkaˀ/ "by day". Although this was never done consistently, Lockhart notes that writing /ʔ/ as h was "perennial" and "the tradition of it never entirely disappeared".

== Post-classical orthography ==
As before, in post-classical orthography vowel length was never marked, and glottal stop was written only sporadically (as h).

The "single most substantial change" was the replacement, starting around 1650, of c (before e and i), ç and z by s. This change was inspired by the merger of the Spanish apico-alveolar sibilant (written s) with the dental sibilant, and by the beginning of the 18th century the use of s had become the norm, as in totlasomahuisnantzin for classical totlaçomahuiznantzin /totɬasoʔmawisˈnaːnt͡sin/ "our precious revered mother". The digraph tz for /ts/ remained unchanged.

With that, the orthography of post-classical texts shows growing instability, mainly through the influence of dialectal (non-classical) varieties of the language. One source of instability was the disappearance in some varieties of spoken Nahuatl of some syllable-final consonants, in particular /n/, which was reflected in the orthography. Other orthographical variants, encountered in all three stages, are:

- geminated consonants written as a single consonants
- i /i(ː)/ written y, especially in word-initial position
- o /oː/ written u
- hu /w/ written u, ho or o
- ce /se(ː)/ and ci /si(ː)/ written çe, çi (matching ça /sa(ː)/ and ço /so(ː)/)

== “Neoclassical” orthography ==
Since the 1970s, linguists working on Nahuatl have made use of what may be termed a "neoclassical" orthography for the language. This orthography is closely modelled on the classical (Stage 2) spelling as described above, but with the following adaptations:

- following Carochi, long vowels are always marked with a macron: classical a, e, i, o > neoclassical a/ā, e/ē, i/ī, o/ō
- syllable-final glottal stop is always written h, for example classical tlacuilo > neoclassical tlahcuiloh /tɬaʔkʷiloo̥/; the use of h is based on historical precedent, and lends the glottal stop more "body" than the diacritics used by Carochi
- syllable-final /kʷ/ is always written uc, for example classical tecuhtli, tecutli or teuctli > neoclassical tēuctli /teːˈkʷt͡ɬi/ "lord".

Also, a few classical spelling conventions are brought into line with the current standardised Spanish orthography:

- ça and ço are replaced with za and zo, for example classical çacatl /ˈsakatɬ/ "grass, hay", çoquitl /ˈsokitɬ/ "clay, mud" > neoclassical zacatl, zoquitl
- qua is replaced with cua, for example classical quaquauhconetl /kʷaːkʷaʍˈkoneːt͡ɬ/ "calf" > neoclassical cuācuauhconētl.

The neoclassical spelling of Nahuatl provides a full written representation of all phonologically relevant facts. It is employed in two central reference tools in modern Nahuatl studies, Andrews' Introduction to Classical Nahuatl (1975, revised edition 2003), and Karttunen's Analytical Dictionary of Nahuatl (1983). It is also often used for the transcription of Nahuatl terms in non-linguistic disciplines such as sociology, anthropology, and history.

It has to be borne in mind however that the neoclassical spelling is a modern construct, which does not exactly reproduce any of the actual orthographies that were used in historical printed and manuscript sources.

Overview of the neoclassical orthography:

	/a/	/e/	/i/	/o/	/aː/	/eː/	/iː/	/oː/	/∅/
/k/	ca	que	qui	co	cā	quē	quī	cō	-c
/tʃ/	cha	che	chi	cho	chā	chē	chī	chō	-ch
/kʷ/	cua	cue	cui		cuā	cuē	cuī		-uc
/w/	hua	hue	hui		huā	huē	huī		-uh
/l/	la	le	li	lo	lā	lē	lī	lō	-l
/m/	ma	me	mi	mo	mā	mē	mī	mō	-m
/n/	na	ne	ni	no	nā	nē	nī	nō	-n
/p/	pa	pe	pi	po	pā	pē	pī	pō	-p
/t/	ta	te	ti	to	tā	tē	tī	tō	-t
/tɬ/	tla	tle	tli	tlo	tlā	tlē	tlī	tlō	-tl
/ts/	tza	tze	tzi	tzo	tzā		tzī	tzō	-tz
/ʃ/	xa	xe	xi	xo	xā	xē	xī	xō	-x
/j/	ya	ye	yi	yo	yā	yē	yī	yō	
/s/	za	ce	ci	zo	zā	cē	cī	zō	-z
/ʔ/									-h

Glottal stop occurs frequently in syllable-final position, and very rarely between like vowels in forms that resulted from reduplication. It is then also written h, as in ehēcatl /eʔˈeːkat͡ɬ/ "wind", ohōme /oʔˈoːme/ "two by two"; cf. classical eecatl and oome.

The neoclassical spelling does not regulate the spelling of Spanish loanwords, because "loanwords exist in the language in all stages of assimilation to the phonology of the language (…). As a result, it is rather meaningless to assign canonical forms to them, existing as they do in transit from one language to the other."

== The new orthography ==
A new orthography was introduced in 1950 in the weekly cultural magazine Mexihkatl Itonalama, published by the American linguist Robert H. Barlow (director), and the Mexican linguist and native speaker Miguel Barrios Espinosa (editor-in-chief). The frontpage of the first issue of 12 May 1950 carries the headline ININ TOTLAHTOL OKSE: TLEKA TIKIHKWILOSKEH KEMEN KAXTILLAN? "This language of ours is a different one: why should we write it as if it were Spanish?"

Compared to classical Nahuatl spelling as described above, the new orthography as proposed and used in Mexihkatl Itonalama contains the following changes:

- /s/ is written s instead of c/ç/z
- /ts/ is written ts instead of tz
- /k/ is written k instead of c/qu
- /kʷ/ is written kw instead of qu/cu/uc
- /w/ is written w instead of hu/uh
- /ʔ/ is written h

The new orthography thus does away with all almost all the typically Spanish spelling conventions of the classical orthography. The exception is the digraph ch /tʃ/, which was kept, but which could have been replaced with tx.

The new orthography does not mark the vowel length contrast, which has been lost in most modern dialects.

Overview of the new orthography:

	/a/	/e/	/i/	/o/	/∅/
/tʃ/	cha	che	chi	cho	-ch
/k/	ka	ke	ki	ko	-k
/kʷ/	kwa	kwe	kwi		-kw
/l/	la	le	li	lo	-l
/m/	ma	me	mi	mo	-m
/n/	na	ne	ni	no	-n
/p/	pa	pe	pi	po	-p
/s/	sa	se	si	so	-s
/t/	ta	te	ti	to	-t
/tɬ/	tla	tle	tli	tlo	-tl
/ts/	tsa	tse	tsi	tso	-ts
/w/	wa	we	wi		-w
/ʃ/	xa	xe	xi	xo	-x
/j/	ya	ye	yi	yo	
/ʔ/					-h

This new orthography, now usually named the "modern orthography" (ortografía moderna), is used for the writing of some modern dialects, sometimes with the alternative spellings ku for kw, and u for w. Also, long vowels can be written with double symbols aa, ee, ii, oo, and fricative /h/, which occurs in some dialects as the reflex of original glottal stop, may be written j.

The new or modern orthography is promoted by the Mexican Secretariat of Public Education (Secretaría de Educación Pública, SEP), a federal government authority, and is sometimes referred to as "the modern orthography of the SEP" (la ortografía moderna de SEP), with some websites wrongly stating that it was designed by SEP experts.

The new or modern orthography has not yet succeeded in becoming the dominant system, and some dialects such as Huasteca are now written in several competing orthographies (neoclassical, modern, and the mixed orthography employed by SIL international).

== See also ==
- Nahuas
- Nahuatl
- Classical Nahuatl
- Classical Nahuatl grammar
- History of Nahuatl
- Nahuan languages

== Cited works ==
- Andrews, J. Richard (2003). Introduction to Classical Nahuatl, Revised Edition. University of Oklahoma Press. ISBN 0-8061-3452-6.
- Canger, Una (2011). "The origin of orthographic hu for /w/ in Nahuatl". Ancient Mesoamerica. 22 (1): 27–35. doi:10.1017/S0956536111000058. JSTOR 26309546. S2CID 162611641.
- Carochi, Horacio (1645). Arte de la lengua mexicana con la declaración de los adverbios della. Mexico City: Juan Ruiz.
- Karttunen, Frances (1983). An Analytical Dictionary of Nahuatl. Austin: University of Texas Press. ISBN 0-8061-2421-0.
- Launey, Michel (1994). Une grammaire omniprédicative – Essai sur la morphosyntaxe du nahuatl classique. Paris: CNRS Éditions. ISBN 2-271-05072-3.
- Launey, Michel (2011). An Introduction to Classical Nahuatl. Cambridge University Press. ISBN 978-0521732291.
- Lockhart, James (2001). Nahuatl as Written: Lessons in Older Written Nahuatl, with Copious Examples and Texts. UCLA Latin American Studies, Vol. 88. Stanford University Press. ISBN 0-8047-4282-0.
- Molina, Alonso de (1571). Vocabulario en lengua castellana y mexicana. Mexico City: Antonio de Spinosa.
