= Sumario Compendioso =

First mathematics book published in the New World

The Sumario Compendioso was the first mathematics book published in the New World. The book was published in Mexico City in 1556 by a clergyman Juan Diez.

== Availability ==
The book has been digitized and is available on the Internet.

Before the Digital Age the only four known surviving copies were preserved at the Huntington Library, San Marino, California, the British Library, London, Duke University Library, and the University of Salamanca in Spain.

== Excerpts ==
In his book The Math Book, Clifford A. Pickover provided the following information about Sumario Compendioso:

The Sumario Compendioso, published in Mexico City in 1556, is the first work on mathematics printed in the Americas. The publication of Sumario Compendioso in the New World preceded by many decades the emigration of the Puritans to North America and the settlement in Jamestown, Virginia. The author, Brother Juan Diez, was a companion of Hernando Cortes, the Spanish conquistador, during Cortes's conquests of the Aztec Empire.
