= Vocabulario en lengua castellana y mexicana =

Book by Alonso de Molina

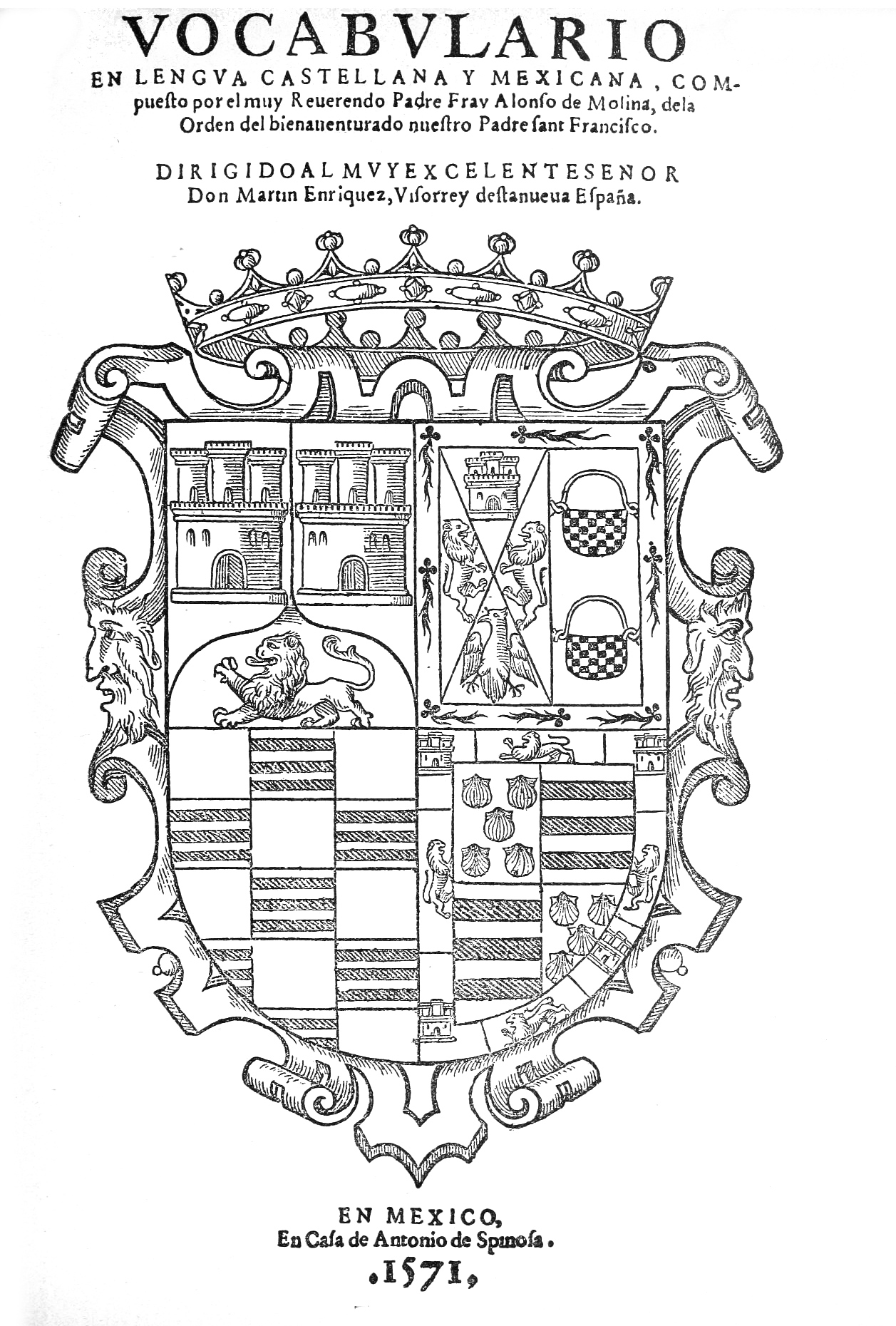
- Author: Alonso de Molina
- Language: Spanish and Nahuatl
- Genre: Dictionary
- Publisher: Juan Pablos
- Publication date: 1555
- Publication place: Mexico

Vocabulario en lengua castellana y mexicana is a bilingual dictionary of Spanish and Nahuatl by Alonso de Molina, first published in 1555 originally entitled Aquí comiença un vocabulario en la lengua castellana y mexicana, edited by Juan Pablos. It was the first dictionary to be published in the New World. However the most relevant and most famous edition was the one made in 1571, edited by Antonio de Spinosa, which then came to be named Vocabulario en lengua castellana y mexicana. This new edition included the Nahuatl-to-Spanish section that the original didn't.

The Franciscan missionaries promoted the writing of literature works to evangelize the Indians in their own language, Nahuatl being one of the most important considering that it was spoken throughout New Spain. After the Council of Trent, the hierarchy of the Catholic Church recommended to preach in indigenous languages. During the rule of viceroy Martín Enríquez de Almanza, Molina published Spanish-to-Nahuatl and Nahuatl-to-Spanish vocabularies to help the formation of priests that were to accomplish the evangelizing assignments.

Molina's Vocabulario is considered the most important dictionary of the Classical Nahuatl language and has continued to be reprinted into the 20th century. It is typically referred to simply as Molina.

== First printed vocabulary of an indigenous language ==
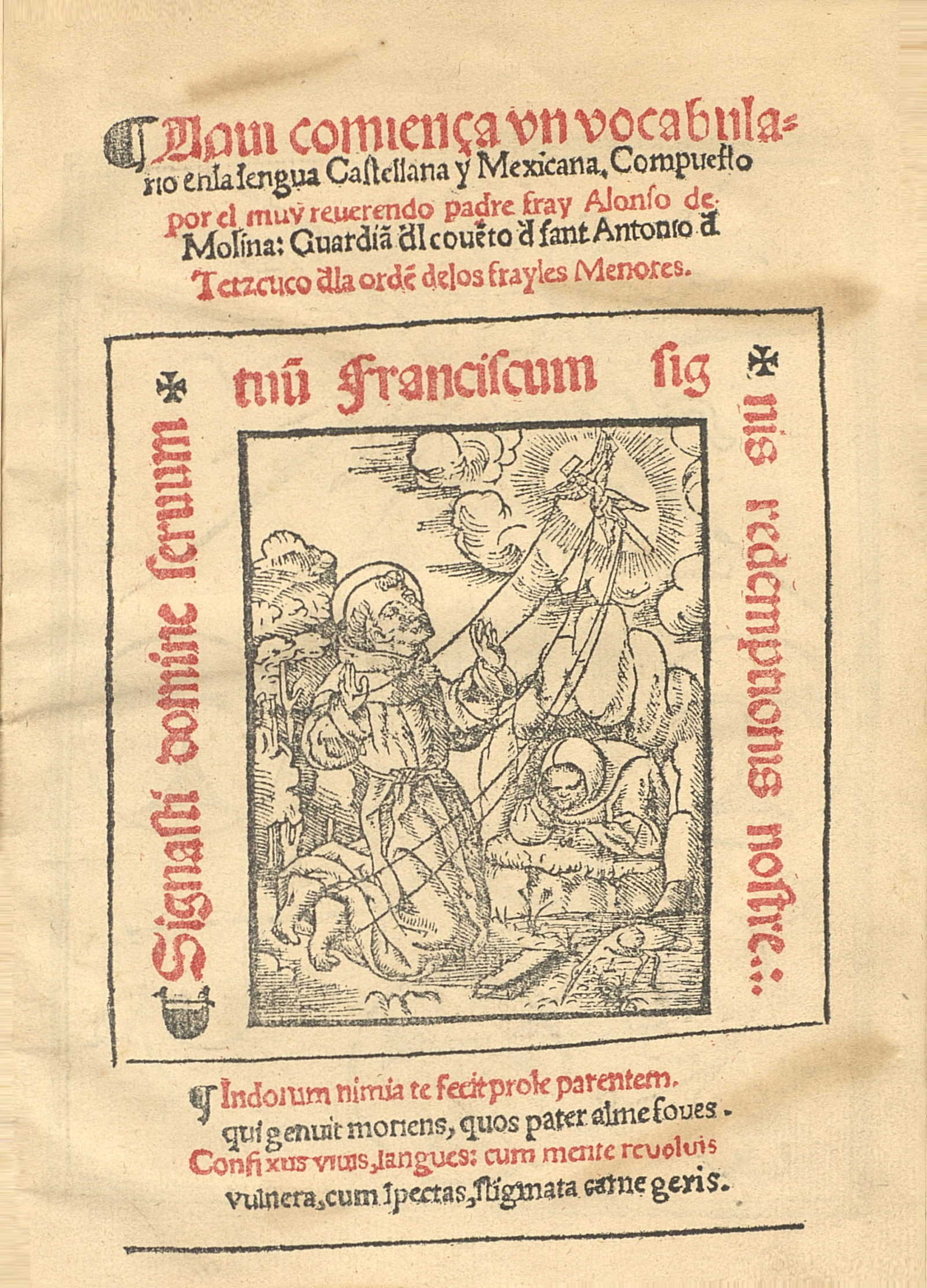
Aquí comiença un vocabulario en la lengua castellana y mexicana

It is believed that Nahuatl was the first of the indigenous languages of the Americas to be linguistically studied, since the first preserved grammar of an American language is Arte de la lengua mexicana (1547) by Andrés de Olmos; moreover, shortly after in 1555, the first vocabulary of an indigenous language was published: Molina's vocabulary.

This first edition of the dictionary only contained the Spanish-to-Nahuatl section, based on which Molina made the 1571 edition adding the Nahuatl-to-Spanish section.

== Formal characteristics ==
The 1571 Vocabulary de 1571 is divided in two sections, very much like modern bilingual dictionaries, individually foliated: the Spanish-to-Nahuatl section consists of 118 sheets and the Nahuatl-to-Spanish one, of 162 sheets. There are 4 columns on each sheet and each one of them contains approximately 35 entries, thus containing 16500 Spanish-to-Nahuatl entries and 22600 Nahuatl-to-Spanish entries.

The first section is headed by the printing licenses and a letter to New Spain's viceroy, D. Martínez Enríquez.

Both sections are preceded by a foreword in which he justifies the work and where a series of notifications about the peculiarities of the Mexican language appeared.

At the end of the first section there is an attachment, which already appeared in the 1555 edition, where the Franciscan gives grammatical instructions of the numbers in Nahuatl, with equivalences in Spanish.

== Editions ==
There are 7 known editions:

- 1555. Aquí comiença un vocabulario en la lengua castellana y mexicana.
- 1571.
- 1880, by Julius Platzmann, Leipzig.
- 1910, by Rufino González, Puebla Talleres el Escritorio, only Spanish-to-Nahuatl.
- 1944, facsimile edition by Colección de Incunables americanos, siglo XVI, v. IV, Madrid, Cultura Hispánica.
- 1966, abbreviated and modernized edition.
- 1970, 1977, 1992 reprint. Mexico, Porrúa, preliminary study by Miguel León-Portilla.
