= Alonso Gutiérrez =

Spanish philosopher (c.1507–1584)

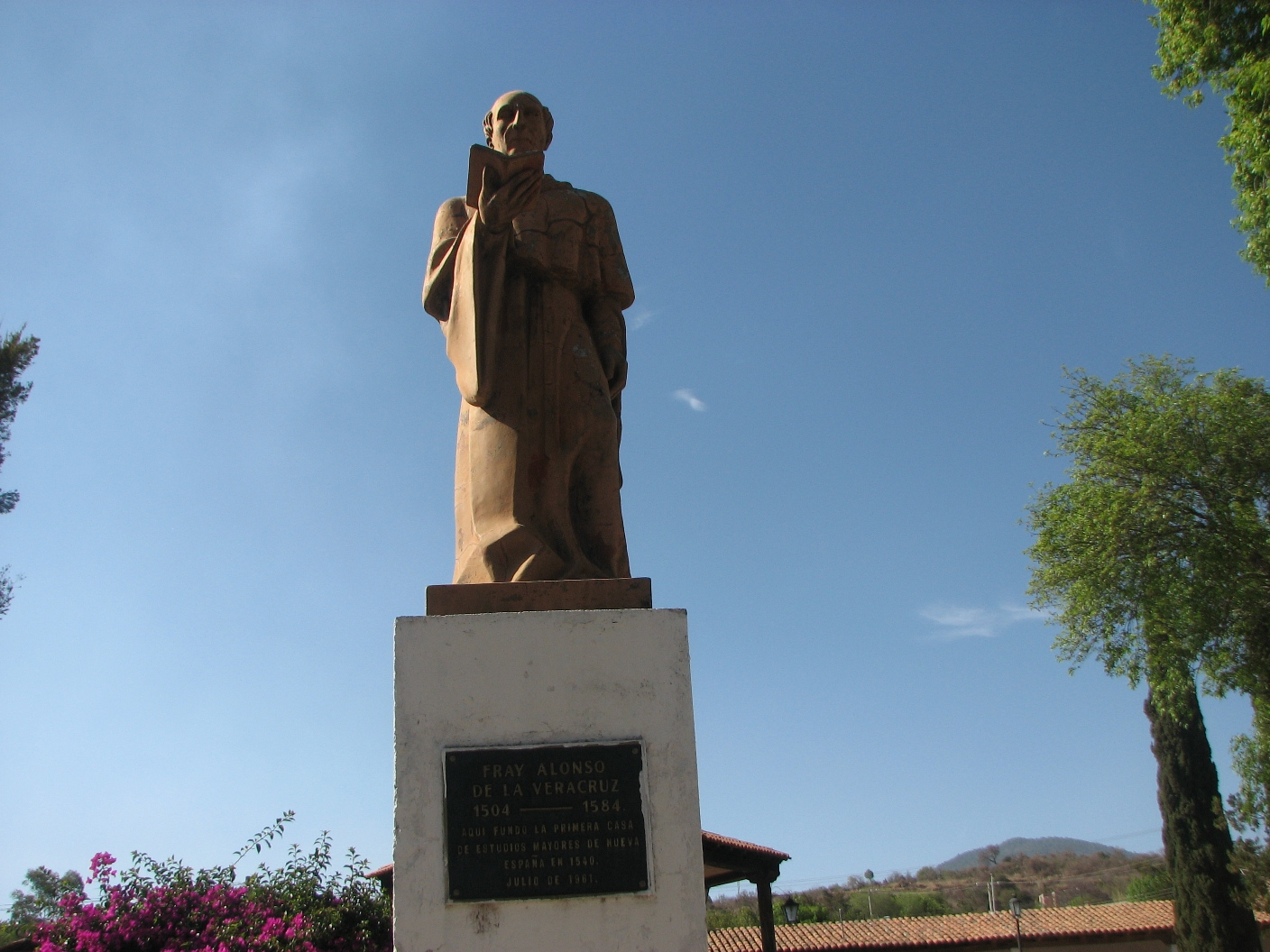
Fray Alonso de la Vera Cruz monument in Tiripetío, Michoacán.

Alonso Gutiérrez (1507 – July 1584), known by his religious name Fray Alonso de Veracruz, was a Spanish Augustinian friar, missionary, philosopher, theologian and jurist who played a leading role in the establishment of higher education and the defence of indigenous rights in New Spain.

== Biography ==
Born in Caspueñas, Guadalajara, in the former kingdom and archbishopric of Toledo in 1507, Alonso Gutiérrez undertook his initial studies in grammar and rhetoric at the University of Alcalá before proceeding to the University of Salamanca, where he graduated in arts and theology. At Salamanca he became a distinguished pupil of the eminent jurist and theologian Francisco de Vitoria. Invited by the Augustinian superior in New Spain, he embarked at Seville and landed at the port of Veracruz on 2 July 1536. There he entered the Augustinian Order, taking the name Veracruz, and professed his vows in Mexico City on 20 July 1537. He subsequently moved to the province of Michoacán, mastering the Purépecha language to preach effectively to the indigenous population and prepare them for the sacraments. In Tiripetío he founded a college and established what became the first library in the Americas, practising an early form of inculturation by teaching in the native tongue rather than imposing Spanish.

In 1553 Veracruz was appointed professor of philosophy and theology at the newly founded Real Universidad de México, where he established the inaugural chair of Thomistic theology. Called back to Spain in 1562, he defended the privileges of the mendicant orders before the crown, served as a royal counsellor and was elected Prior of San Felipe el Real in Madrid. Despite offers to remain at court, he returned to New Spain in 1572, where he founded the College of San Pablo in Mexico City and continued to promote missionary and educational endeavours until his death in July 1584.

== Works and legacy ==
Veracruz authored the first philosophical texts printed in the Americas—Recognitio summularum (1554), Dialectica resolutio (1554) and Physica speculatio (1557)—which together comprised a complete Arts curriculum for the nascent university. His theological and juridical treatises include the Speculum coniugiorum on the validity of pre‑Christian marriages among indigenous peoples and the Relectio de dominio infidelium et de justo bello, in which he formulated principles of just war and defended the rights of native communities. His insistence on vernacular instruction showed a commitment to respect for indigenous cultures. Through his teaching, administration and writings, Fray Alonso de Veracruz laid the foundations of philosophy, theology, agrarian law and international law in colonial Mexico and significantly shaped the intellectual life of New Spain.
