= Juan de la Anunciación =

Augustinian friar

Juan de la Anunciación (Born at Granada in Spain, probably 1514; died 1594) was an Augustinian friar who traveled to Mexico as a missionary and who published sermons and a doctrine in the Nahuatl language.
