= Juan de Córdova =

Spanish missionary

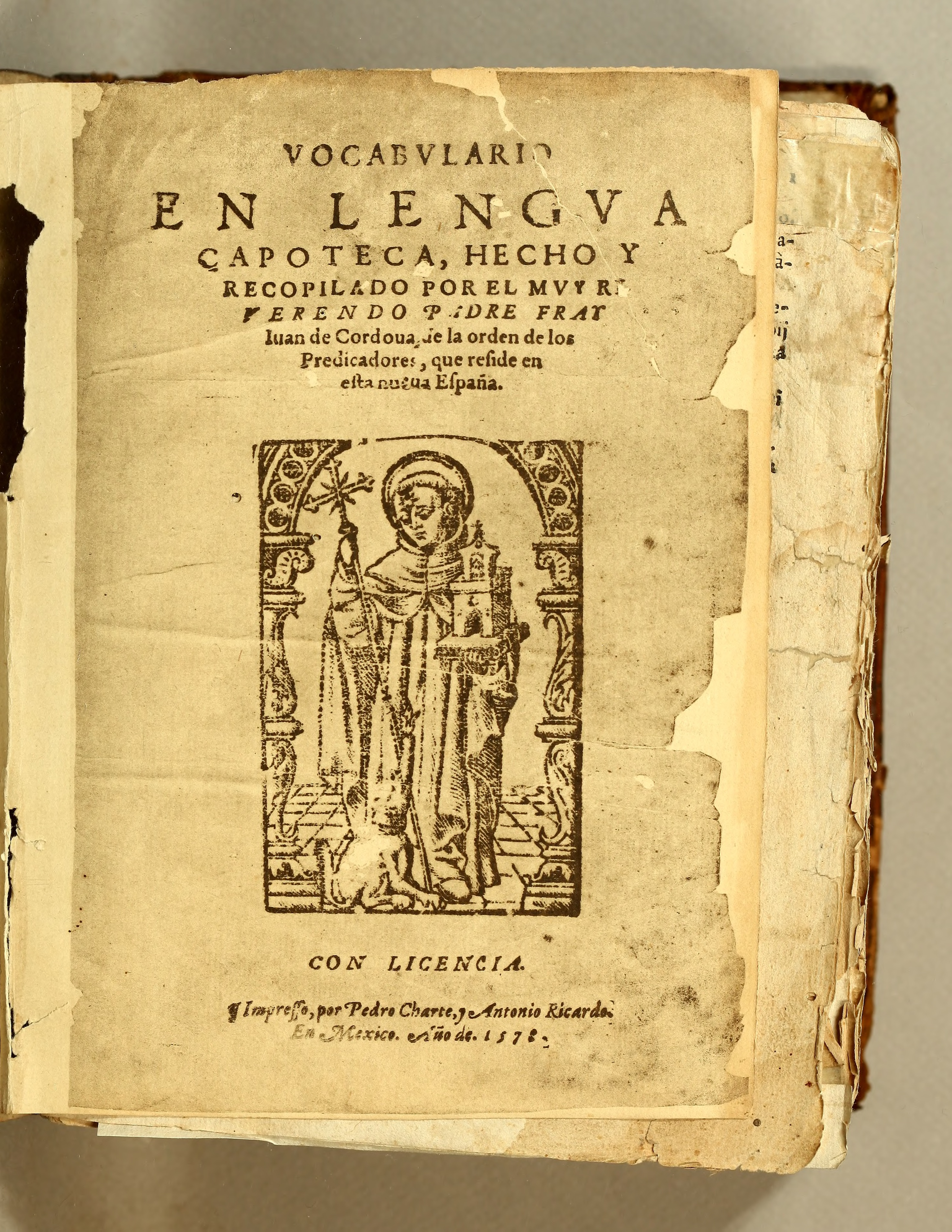
Title page of Vocabulario en lengua çapoteca, 1578

Juan de Córdova (born 1503, at Córdoba in Andalusia, Spain, of noble parents; d. 1595 at Oaxaca, Mexico) was a Spanish Dominican friar, known for his studies of the Zapotec languages. It is not certain whether Córdova was his family name, or whether he assumed it from his native city after he became a Dominican.

== Life ==
He was first a soldier, serving in Flanders as ensign. He then went to Mexico, and accompanied Coronado to New Mexico in 1540-42.

In 1543, he entered the Dominican Order at Mexico and was sent to Oaxaca in 1548, where he acquired the Zapotecan idiom and ministered to the Indians. He was named provincial in 1568.

Brought up under military discipline, he administered as provincial with such severity, that there were many complaints against him to the chapter that congregated at Yanhuitlan in 1570. He refused to comply with the admonitions of his superiors and change his methods, and was accordingly suspended. With the exclamation: "Benedictus Deus!" he received the notification of his deposition, and, declining the interference of the Viceroy Enriquez in his favour, retired to his convent at San Jerónimo Tlacochahuaya in Oaxaca, where he died after twenty-five years spent in retirement and in the study of the Zapotecan language and the customs of the natives.

== Works ==
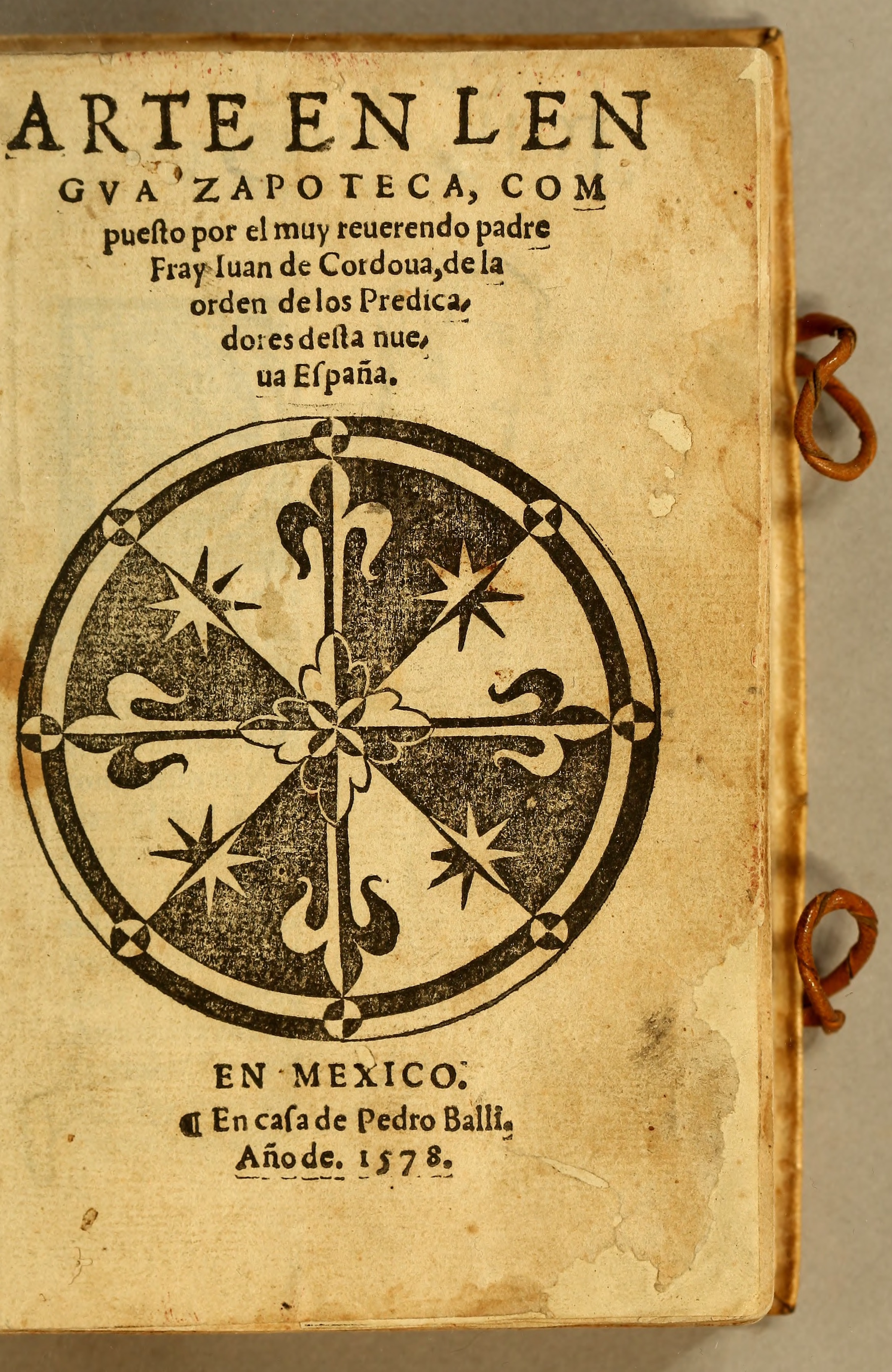
Title page of Arte en lengua zapoteca, 1578

He composed a "Vocabulario de la Lengua Zapoteca, ó Diccionario Hispano-Zapoteco" (Mexico, 1571, or, according to Ycazbalceta, 1578). The "Arte en Lengua Zapoteca" appeared in 1578 at Mexico. Besides the linguistic part, this book contains note on the rites and beliefs of the Zapotecan Indians, and an account of their method of reckoning time, republished by Manuel Orozco y Berra.
