= Alonso de Molina =

Mexican Mesoamerican linguist

"La doctrina cristiana en mexicano" (Christian doctrine in Nahuatl (Mexican)) by the author

Alonso de Molina (1513 or 1514 – 1579 or 1585) was a Franciscan priest and grammarian, who wrote a well-known dictionary of the Nahuatl language published in 1571 and still used by scholars working on Nahuatl texts in the tradition of the New Philology. He also wrote a bilingual confessional manual for priests who served in Nahuatl-speaking communities.

== Biography ==
He was born in Extremadura, Spain in the Province of Cáceres, and he arrived in Mexico, still a child, in 1522, during the Spanish conquest of Mexico. He grew up playing with monolingual Nahuatl-speaking children in the streets as the Aztec capital, Tenochtitlan, was being refashioned into Mexico City and so he became a fluent speaker of Nahuatl. In 1528, as a young man, he entered the Franciscan convent of Mexico City becoming a friar. He taught at the Colegio de Santa Cruz in Tlatelolco along with Bernardino de Sahagún, Andrés de Olmos, Arnaldo de Basaccio, Juan de Gaona, and Maturino Gilberti Students at the school were also important. Juan Badiano, a student at the school, translated a Nahuatl herbal into Latin. Besides his clerical duties, Molina devoted himself to studying, understanding, and writing Nahuatl. He composed and preached many sermons in the language.

== Vocabulary ==
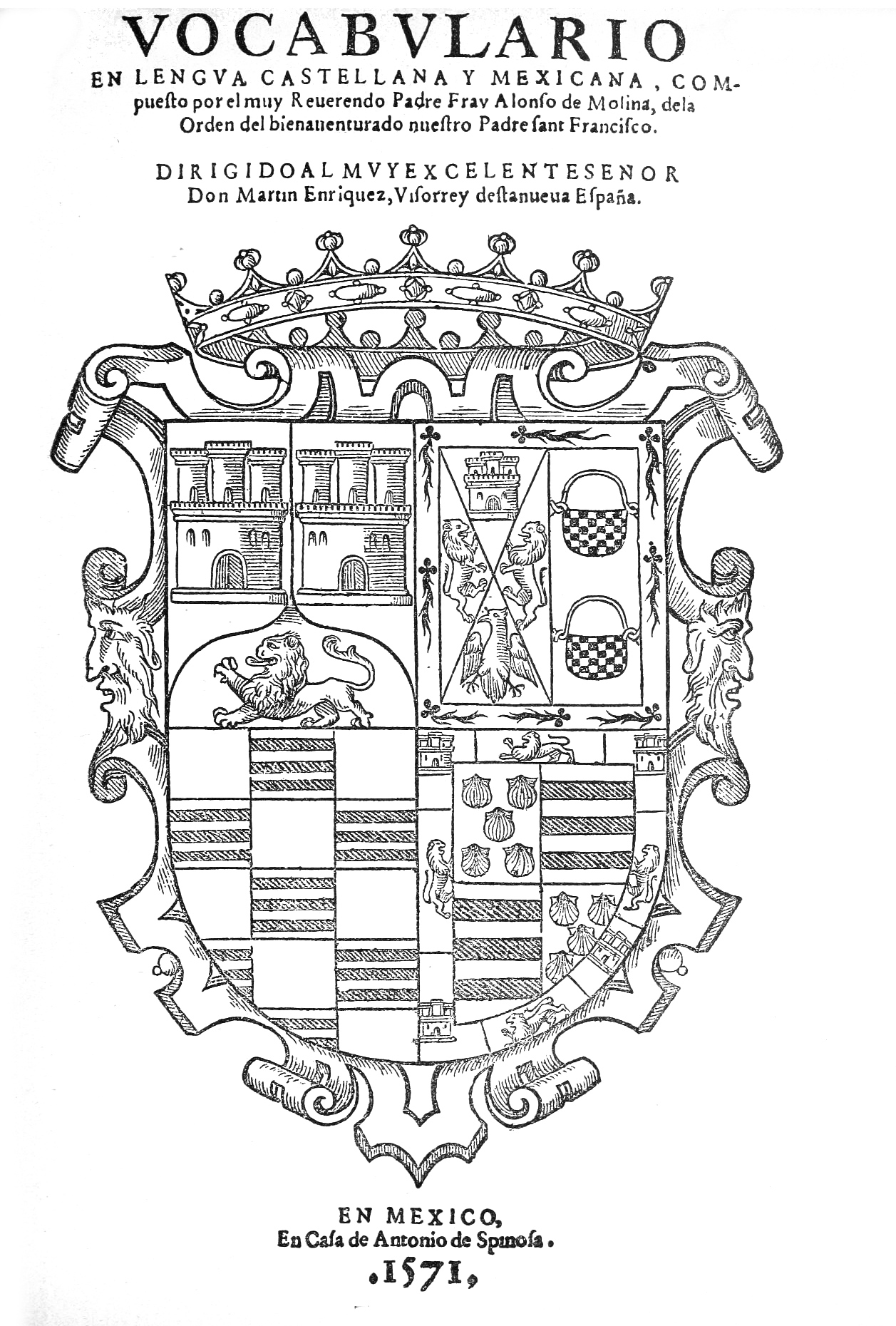
Molina's dictionary.

Molina's Vocabulary in Castilian and Mexican language, which he composed between 1555 and 1571, was the first dictionary printed in the New World and, together with Olmos's work, was the first published systematic approach to an indigenous language. It is still considered an indispensable tool for students of Classical Nahuatl.

According to James Lockhart, "Molina went far beyond utilitarian basics to include a vast range of vocabulary, making many subtle semantic and grammatical distinctions."

Molina's work creating tools for Nahuatl came under scrutiny by the Inquisition along with those of other Franciscans. In 1574, he attempted to reprint his Vocabulary, an indispensable tool for evangelization in Nahuatl, but the Inquisition compelled him to restate sections of his introduction to the work that it considered to be incorrect.

Lockhart's analysis of Nahuatl as an index of cultural change relies on Molina's 1555 Vocabulary, which translates Nahuatl (Mexicana) to Spanish (Castellana), as a key source for loanwords from Spanish into Nahuatl in which he calls Stage 2, the second generation of language contact (ca. 1550 to 1600). Molina records many nouns from Spanish that became integrated into Nahuatl, but his dictionary also records Nahuatl descriptions of Spanish concepts or objects. Lockhart listed some of them, including "bier" = miccatlapechtli "dead-person platform"; "plow" = quaquauhe ielimiquia "means by which an ox cultivates"; "justice, the law (justicia)" = tlamelahuacahihualiztli "doing things straight"; "pirate" = acalco tenamoyani "one who robs people on a boat".

Molina's Confessionario (1569) includes a model testament, with elements that were standard features of Nahuatl wills: an invocation, the name and the residence of the testator, declarations of the testator being of sound mind, the disposition of property to particular heirs or designation of property to be sold for masses, and the closing section with named executors (albaceas) and witnesses (testigos).

== Works ==
- Doctrina christiana breve traduzida en lengua mexicana (1547)
- Aquí comiença un vocabulario en la lengua castellana y mexicana (1555)
- Confessionario mayor, en lengua mexicana y castellana (1565)
- La vida del buenaventurado Sant Francisco (1570) https://www.cervantesvirtual.com/obra/la-vida-del-bienauenturado-sant-francisco-fundador-de-la-sagrada-religion-de-los-frayles-menores-segun-la-recopilacion-del-seraphico-doctor-sant-buenauentura-/
- Arte de la lengua mexicana y castellana (1571)
- Vocabulario en lengua castellana y mexicana (1571)
- Confessionario breve, en lengua mexicana (1577)
