= Pedro de Morales =

Spanish religious writer

Pedro de Morales (1538–1614) was a Spanish religious writer.

In 1579, a letter he sent to Pope Gregory XIII regarding festivities surround relics contained the first known record of the word chocolate as of 2010.
