= Agustín Farfán =

Spanish medical missionary

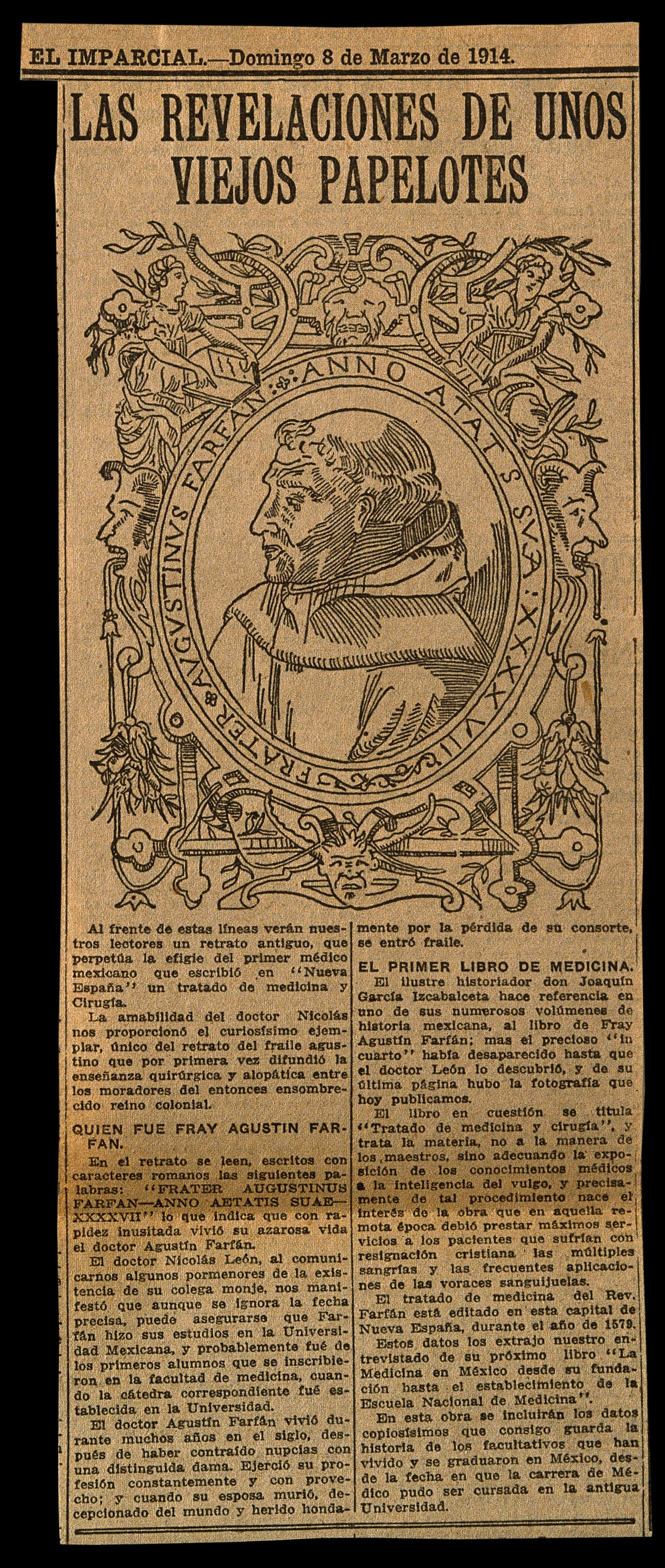
Portrait of Agustin Farfán, as depicted in a woodcut from 1914.

Pedro Garcia Farfán (1532–1604), better known as Agustín Farfán, was a Spanish medical missionary who studied medicine in Seville, Spain, initially serving as a physician for King Phillip II before moving to New Spain with his family in 1557, where he continued his studies and became one of the first to receive a medical degree from the National Autonomous University of New Spain. Upon the death of his wife in 1568, Farfán joined the Order of Saint Augustine and became a prominent figure in the Augustinian order, contributing to the construction and maintenance of convents there.

Farfán went on to perform therapeutic experiments in the Hospital Real de Naturales and serve as protomedic for New Spain, devising one of the earliest medical manuals there. He incorporated both European and indigenous medical knowledge into a treatise that would be published a total of three times, first as Tratado breve de anathomía y chirugía in 1579, and then Tratado Breve de Medicina in 1592, before his work was posthumously updated in 1610. Farfán is commemorated as a revolutionary doctor and surgeon who was endorsed by the viceroy of New Spain at the time for his ability to offer alternative treatments and medical knowledge accessible to a wide audience, including back in Europe.

== Family history and personal life ==
Pedro Garcia Farfán was born in 1532 to Pedro Farfán and Lorenza Getil of Lejalde in Seville, Spain. He moved to New Spain (present-day Mexico) with his wife Margarita de Vergara y Fuentes and daughter Francisca, in 1557, likely to join his relatives there. He had two more daughters in Mexico, all joined religious orders under the Regina Monastery of Mexico. Upon the death of his wife, Farfán joined the Order of Saint Augustine in 1568 and thus adopted the name Friar Agustín Farfán, the name by which he is most commonly referred to. He first resided in the province of Oaxaca due to its proximity to the Agustinian priory there and then Mexico City until his passing in 1604.

== Education ==
Farfán studied medicine in the University of Alcalá de Henares and received his degree from the University of Seville in 1552. After moving to New Spain, he became one of the first recipients of a medical degree from the University of Mexico in 1567.

== Religion ==
Upon his conversion to the Agustinian order, Farfán studied theology and devoted himself to the Virgin Mary, and in 1579, with other members of the convent of San Agustín, facilitated the construction of another church and convent in the Mexican capital. He became the first prior of many other convents and visitador of the province of Mexico.

He received a pontifical dispensation to continue his work as a doctor, despite his religious affiliation, serving people of other religious orders as well. A majority of his medical discoveries were during his time living in Oaxaca as a Friar, where he collected many remedies and cures.

== Medical career ==
In Spain, he was appointed as a family doctor and chamber physician of the Spanish Royal Court to King Phillip II. Due to his losing his hearing, he was not able to continue performing his royal services and left the court. He then moved to Mexico and furthered his education in the University of Mexico, becoming appointed protomedic of New Spain in 1568 and designated as the inspector of pharmacies in Mexico City and the dean of the University of Mexico.

Farfán conducted therapeutic experiments at the Hospital Real de Naturales, and probably worked with Francisco Hernández de Toledo there in 1574. He is speculated to have included some of Hernández's discoveries without crediting him, though Farfán mentions him twice in his work, Tratado Breve de Medicina, which he would later write.

=== Tractado, First Edition ===
With twenty seven-years of experience practicing medicine and surgery, Farfán wrote Tractado breve de anathomía y chirugía, y de algunas enfermedades que más comúnmente suelen haver en esta Nueva España (roughly translating to Brief Treatise on Surgery and the Understanding and Cures of Some of the Illnesses that Commonly Occur in this Land) in 1579, one of the first medical manuals of New Spain. This edition consists of an alphabetized index of body parts, illnesses, and treatments (especially common ones, such as fevers and dysentery) and sometimes uses his religious authority to substantiate claims.

Aside from the discoveries made by him and his colleagues, Farfán also derived his findings for the book on surgery from Greek, barbarian, and 'modern' scholars; notably, he quotes Aristotle, Hippocrates, and Guy de Chauliac. His extensive use of different sources therefore revealed the availability of medical literature in Mexico to him. He also reflects in the book on his own experiences, either expanding upon the aforementioned scholars, comparing their experiences to his, or contesting them altogether.

As opposed to just benefiting medical professionals, Farfán sought to reach as wide of an audience as possible with the publication; he lists a multitude of alternative treatments for readers with a lack of access to metropolitan centers, European-trained practitioners, and access to indigenous marketplaces instead. As a result, more Spanish settlers moved into indigenous spaces in Mexico, given their confirmed accessibility to medical treatments.

=== Tratado, Second Edition ===
Farfán was concerned that, due to his thorough and specialized jargon, his work would be difficult to understand for the average person. As a result, Farfán revised his work, publishing a restructured version of his treatise in 1592, which he dedicated to Luis de Velasco, viceroy of Mexico. He changed the title of the second edition from Tratado breve de anothomia y chirugia to Tratado breve de Medicina, y de todas las enfermedades (roughly translating to Brief Treatise on Medicine and Illnesses).

In the second edition, Farfán shifts toward a more informal and "self-referential" tone, condenses while including more information, and restructures the text to the following format: four books, the first on stomach ailments; the second on treatments for illnesses pertaining to the face and respiratory system; the third on blood ailments; and the fourth on wounds, sores, and bodily issues, along with some anatomy. These books are then followed by an index of known diseases at the end.

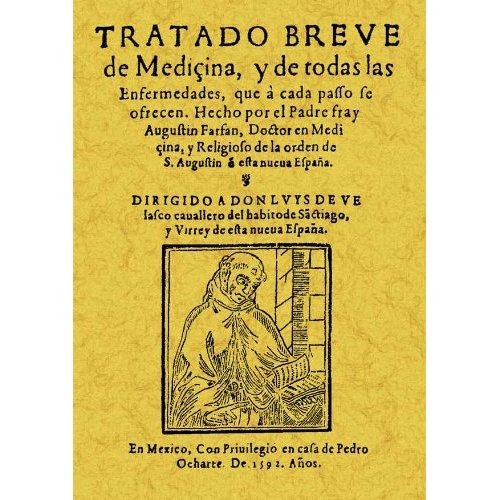
Cover of Farfán's publication Tratado breve de Medicina y todas las enfermedades

Especially in his second treatise, he legitimatizes and incorporates American pharmacopeia and therapeutics, especially given that local products are the only constant and accessible items in New Spain. Farfán recommends almost sixty different treatments made from indigenous products for many different ailments, including roots, plants, and animals, providing an alternative option for those with a lack of access to competent care.

In the second edition, Farfán also challenges doctors of the time, directing them to the last two books in the treatise—anatomy and surgery—and advising them to learn anatomy to avoid making nearly as many mistakes as they were. Despite his assertion that doctors are still necessary, he denounces poorly trained ones passing as physicians in New Spain, calling them "matasanos" (translating to slayers of the healthy) and "carniceros" (translating to butchers) for endangering and exploiting their patients.

Farfán sought to address the most pressing issues of his environment; for instance, in his treatise, he created a chapter on smallpox, which, due to European conquest, created an epidemic killing millions in New Spain during the 16th century. He notes smallpox as a lethal disease affecting the indigenous peoples, offering speculated causes along with treatments, such as bloodletting, in response.

In his treatise, Farfán notes challenges that arise from treating indigenous patients as a result of cultural differences, namely their eating habits; bloodletting, for instance, would be a dangerous treatment due to the diets of indigenous peoples there.

He observed the widespread medicinal use of local flora, citing chili peppers, rhubarb, and vanilla as purgatives, alongside warm chocolate as a laxative.

==== Cocoa ====
Through his Tratado Breve de Medicina, Farfán was the first to introduce cocoa, derived from cacao (native to New Spain), to Europe. In fact, especially after chocolate developed as a widespread Mesoamerican remedy, its medical uses became popularized in Europe. Even through the 17th and 18th centuries, doctors affirmed the healthy effects of chocolate, consequently boosting the import of chocolate and introducing its consumption in the Old World.

== Legacy ==
Luis de Velasco, viceroy of Mexico, endorsed Farfán's efforts at publishing his book, officially legitimizing Farfán's work through the government.

Farfán's Tratado Breve de Medicina achieved such popularity that it was reprinted three times, once in 1579, 1592, and 1610, posthumously; even after Farfán's death, the attorney general of the Augustinian Order requested an extension from Velasco to reprint it.

Spanish and Agustinian historian Esteban García asserts that his contemporaries commemorated him as a successful doctor and esteemed surgeon, with distinguished people from all over Mexico attending his consultations.

Farfán is cited in Agustin Verancurt's Teatro Mexicano (1698), a work that notes profound historical, political, and religious events in New Spain.

The third copy of Tratado Breve de Medicina is currently being preserved by The United States National Library of Medicine.
