= 3rd federal electoral district of Michoacán =

Federal electoral district of Mexico

Michoacán's 3rd
- Electoral district of the Chamber of Deputies of Mexico

- 3rd district since 2023

Incumbent
- Member: Mary Carmen Bernal Martínez
- Party: ▌Labour Party
- Congress: 66th (2024–2027)

District
- State: Michoacán
- Head town: Heroica Zitácuaro
- Coordinates: 19°26′N 100°22′W
- Covers: 14 municipalities: Angangueo, Aporo, Contepec, Epitacio Huerta, Juárez, Jungapeo, Maravatío, Ocampo, Senguio, Susupuato, Tlalpujahua, Tuxpan, Tuzantla, Zitácuaro
- PR region: Fifth
- Precincts: 272
- Population: 469,649 (2020 census)

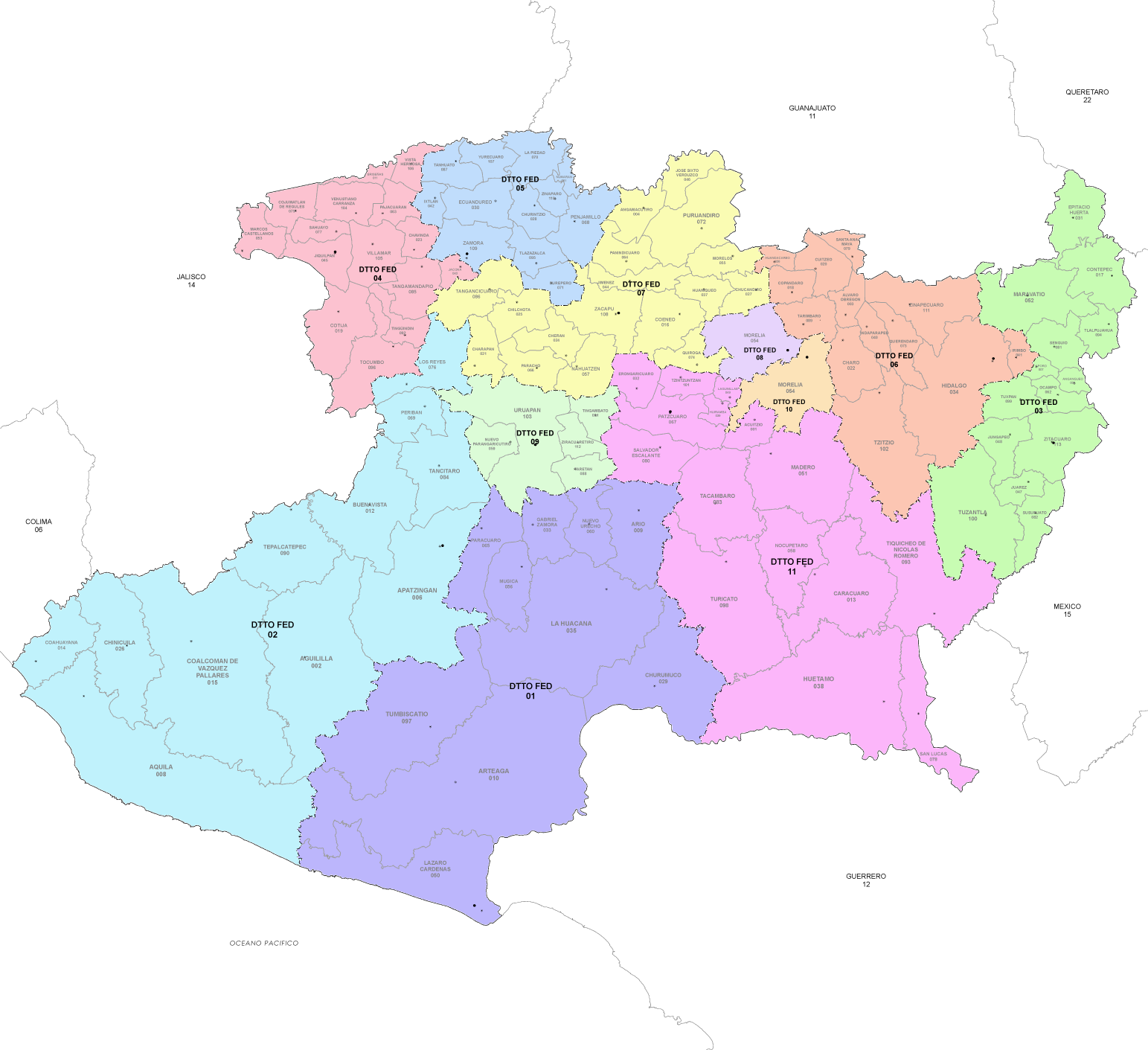
Michoacán's federal electoral districts since 2023

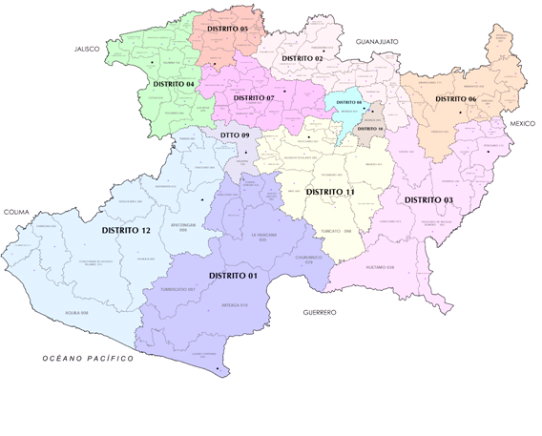
Michoacán under the 2017–2022 districting scheme

The 3rd federal electoral district of Michoacán (Spanish: Distrito electoral federal 03 de Michoacán) is one of the 300 electoral districts into which Mexico is divided for elections to the federal Chamber of Deputies and one of 11 such districts in the state of Michoacán.

It elects one deputy to the lower house of Congress for each three-year legislative session by means of the first-past-the-post system. Votes cast in the district also count towards the calculation of proportional representation ("plurinominal") deputies elected from the fifth region.

The current member for the district, re-elected in the 2024 general election, is Mary Carmen Bernal Martínez of the Labour Party (PT).

== District territory ==
Michoacán lost its 12th district in the 2023 districting process carried out by the National Electoral Institute (INE). Under the new districting plan, which is to be used for the 2024, 2027 and 2030 federal elections, the 3rd district covers 272 precincts (secciones electorales) across 14 municipalities in the north-east of the state:

- Angangueo, Aporo, Contepec, Epitacio Huerta, Juárez, Jungapeo, Maravatío, Ocampo, Senguio, Susupuato, Tlalpujahua, Tuxpan, Tuzantla and Zitácuaro.

The head town (cabecera distrital), where results from individual polling stations are gathered together and tallied, is the city of Heroica Zitácuaro. The district reported a population of 469,649 in the 2020 census.

== Previous districting schemes ==
Evolution of electoral district numbers
	1974	1978	1996	2005	2017	2023
Michoacán	9	13	13	12	12	11
Chamber of Deputies	196	300				

2017–2022

Between 2017 and 2022, the district was located in the east of the state but shifted southwards compared to its 2023 configuration. Its head town was still at Zitácuaro and it comprised 13 municipalities:
- Angangueo, Carácuaro, Huetamo, Juárez, Jungapeo, Ocampo, San Lucas, Susupuato, Tiquicheo, Tuxpan, Tuzantla, Tzitzio and Zitácuaro.

2005–2017

Under the 2005 districting plan, Michoacán lost its 13th district. The 3rd district's head town was at Zitácuaro but it covered a different set of 13 municipalities:
- Angangueo, Aporo, Charo, Indaparapeo, Juárez, Jungapeo, Ocampo, Susupuato, Tiquicheo, Tuxpan, Tuzantla, Tzitzio and Zitácuaro.

1996–2005

Under the 1996 districting plan, the district's head town was at Zitácuaro and it covered 13 municipalities in that region of the state:
- Angangueo, Aporo, Contepec, Epitacio Huerta, Juárez, Jungapeo, Ocampo, Senguio, Susupuato, Tlalpujahua, Tuzantla, Tuxpan, Zitácuaro.

1978–1996

The districting scheme in force from 1978 to 1996 was the result of the 1977 electoral reforms, which increased the number of single-member seats in the Chamber of Deputies from 196 to 300. Under the reforms, Michoacán's allocation rose from 9 to 13. The 3rd district's head town was at Zacapu and it covered eight municipalities in the centre of the state:
- Coeneo, Cherán, Erongarícuaro, Jiménez, Nahuatzen, Pátzcuaro, Santa Clara and Zacapu.

== Deputies returned to Congress ==
(Mexico) National parties
- Current
- PAN
- PRI
- PT
- PVEM
- MC
- Morena
- PAZ
- Somos
- Defunct or local only
- PLM
- PNR
- PRM
- PNM
- PP
- PPS
- PARM
- PFCRN
- CON
- PANAL
- PSD
- PES
- PES
- PRD

Michoacán's 3rd district
Election	Deputy	Party	Term	Legislature
1916	Cayetano Andrade		1916–1917	Constituent Congress of Querétaro
...
1979	Norberto Mora Plancarte	Institutional Revolutionary Party	1979–1982	51st Congress
1982	Raúl Lemus García	Institutional Revolutionary Party	1982–1985	52nd Congress
1985	Raúl Héctor Castellano	Institutional Revolutionary Party	1985–1988	53rd Congress
1988	Lorenzo Martínez Gómez	Authentic Party of the Mexican Revolution	1988–1991	54th Congress
1991	José Jesús Gregorio Flores Alonzo	Institutional Revolutionary Party	1991–1994	55th Congress
1994	Froylán Velázquez Hernández	Party of the Democratic Revolution	1994–1997	56th Congress
1997	Jaime Castro López	Institutional Revolutionary Party	1997–2000	57th Congress
2000	Silvano Aureoles Conejo (Note: Aureoles Conejo resigned his seat on 30 December 2001 to take office as municipal president of Zitácuaro.); Donaldo Ortiz Colín	Party of the Democratic Revolution	2000–2001; 2001–2003	58th Congress
2003	Pascual Sigala Páez	Party of the Democratic Revolution	2003–2006	59th Congress
2006	Mario Vallejo Estévez	Party of the Democratic Revolution	2006–2009	60th Congress
2009	Dina Herrera Soto	Party of the Democratic Revolution	2009–2012	61st Congress
2012	Silvano Aureoles Conejo (Note: Aureoles Conejo resigned his seat on 26 February 2015 in preparation for his successful run for governor of Michoacán.); Jesús Antonio Mora González	Party of the Democratic Revolution	2012–2015; 2015	62nd Congress
2015	Juan Antonio Ixtláhuac Orihuela; José Luis Baeza Rojas	Institutional Revolutionary Party	2015–2018; 2018	63rd Congress
2018	Mary Carmen Bernal Martínez	Labour Party (Mexico)	2018–2021	64th Congress
2021	Mary Carmen Bernal Martínez	Labour Party (Mexico)	2021–2024	65th Congress
2024 (Note: The PAN/PRI/PRD candidate in the 2024 election, who placed second, was the former incumbent and former governor of Michoacán, Silvano Aureoles Conejo.)	Mary Carmen Bernal Martínez	Labour Party (Mexico)	2024–2027	66th Congress

== Presidential elections ==
Michoacán's 3rd district
Election	District won by	Party or coalition	%
2018	Andrés Manuel López Obrador	Juntos Haremos Historia	49.6176
2024	Claudia Sheinbaum Pardo	Sigamos Haciendo Historia	55.7834
