= Donaldo Ortiz Colín =

Mexican politician

- Born: 18 May 1961 (age 65); Zitácuaro, Michoacán, Mexico
- Occupation: Politician
- Political party: PRD

Donaldo Ortiz Colín (born 18 May 1961) is a Mexican politician from the Party of the Democratic Revolution (PRD). From 2001 to 2003 he sat in the Chamber of Deputies representing Michoacán's third district as the alternate of Silvano Aureoles Conejo.
