= Silvano Aureoles Conejo =

Former governor of Michoacán, Mexico

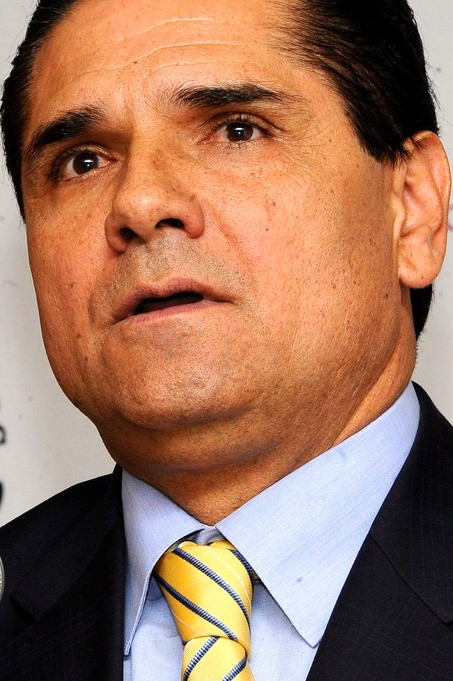

Governor of Michoacán
- In office 1 October 2015 – 30 September 2021
- Preceded by: Salvador Jara Guerrero
- Succeeded by: Alfredo Ramírez Bedolla

President of the Chamber of Deputies
- In office 1 September 2014 – 26 February 2015
- Preceded by: José González Morfin
- Succeeded by: Tomás Torres Mercado

Member of the Chamber of Deputies for Michoacán's 3rd district
- In office 1 September 2012 – 26 February 2015
- Preceded by: Dina Herrera Soto
- Succeeded by: Jesús Antonio Mora González

Personal details
- Born: 23 August 1965 (age 61) Carácuaro, Michoacán, Mexico
- Party: Democratic Revolution Party
- Education: Chapingo Autonomous University (BS, MS)
- Profession: Agronomist

Silvano Aureoles Conejo (born 23 August 1965) is a Mexican politician affiliated with the Party of the Democratic Revolution (PRD) and former governor of Michoacán.

== Career ==
An agricultural engineer and has a Master in Science in Forestry for Regional Rural Development from the Chapingo Autonomous University, Aureoles Conejo has been Executive Commissioner and State Executive Coordinator (UNORCA), participating in discussion forums MOCAF network representation, member of the General Coordination of Permanent Agrarian Congress (1997) Agricultural and Forestry Front Worthy's Budget for Field (1997–1999)

Aureoles Conejo was a Federal Deputy in the 58th Congress, President of the Rural Development Commission, a member of the Committees on Forestry, Agriculture, Ecology and Environment in the Chamber of Deputies. He was mayor of Zitácuaro, President of the Coordinating Municipalista of Michoacán (2002–2003) and Secretary General of the Association of Local Authorities of Mexico AC (AALMAC). In his native Michoacán, he served as Secretary of Agricultural Development, was also President of the Mexican Association of Secretaries of Rural Development, AC. He was a senator in 2006–2012, Chairman of the Committee on Water Resources, Secretary of Agrarian Reform Commission, Secretary of the Committee on Foreign Relations, North America, was a member of the Committees on Agriculture and Livestock, and the Commission of Government and Justice.

In 2012, he was the Deputy Coordinator of the Parliamentary Group of the Party of the Democratic Revolution in the Senate. He was a gubernatorial candidate for the PRD to the Government of Michoacán in 2011. In 2012, he assumed the Vice Presidency of the Board of the Senate. In 2012 he was elected federal deputy for district 03 of Zitácuaro, Michoacán. He was the Coordinator of the Parliamentary Faction of the PRD in the Chamber of Deputies for the 62nd session of Congress.

In 2015, Aureoles Conejo ran for governor of Michoacán; he won with a plurality of 36.17% of the votes. On 1 October he assumed office and was sworn as governor; he served until September 2021.

In the 2024 general election, he ran again for Michoacán's third district but placed second behind Mary Carmen Bernal Martínez of the Sigamos Haciendo Historia coalition.

== Personal life ==
On 10 September 2020, Aureoles Conejo tweeted that he had tested positive for COVID-19.

== Controversies ==
=== Destitution Request ===
In 2019, via social networks, citizens requested the auditing and removal of Silvano Aureoles, using platform change.org and reaching 50,000 signatures, 24,000 of which were collected in less than four days.

=== Fernando Padilla ===
On 13 April 2021, during his visit to Aguililla, he went out of his truck to harass and push Fernando Padilla, a teacher who was protesting among several other people, against the government due to the cartel violence in the region. Silvano was accompanied by bodyguards and military personnel. On 20 April, Fernando Padilla's whereabouts where unknown, as he had to relocate himself for security reasons.

=== Embezzlement ===
In March 2025, Governor of Michoacán Alfredo Ramírez Bedolla announced that INTERPOL had issued a red notice against Aureoles and several former members of his staff for acts of embezzlement committed during his term in office.
