= Aporo =

Aporo may refer to:

- Aporo, Michoacán, Mexico
- Timana James Aporo Tahu (born 1980), rugby league player
- Aporo (song), song by Greek musician Yiannis Parios
