= Jungapeo =

Coordinates: 19°27′N 100°30′W

- Municipality
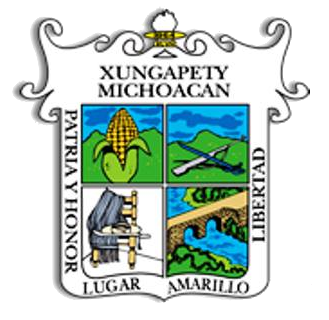
- Coat of arms

- Location in Mexico Jungapeo (Mexico)
- Country: Mexico
- State: Michoacán
- Demonym: (in Spanish)
- Time zone: UTC−6 (CST)

Jungapeo is a municipality in the eastern part of the Mexican state of Michoacán. The municipality has an area of 265.98 square kilometres (0.45% of the surface of the state) and is bordered to the north by the municipality of Tuxpan, to the east by Juárez and Zitácuaro, to the south by Tuzantla, and to the west by Hildago. The municipality had a population of 18,571 inhabitants according to the 2005 census. Its municipal seat is the city of Jungapeo de Juárez.

In pre-Columbian times, the region was dominated by the powerful Purépecha people. Jungapeo is a word of Chichimeca origin that means "Yellow Place".

== See also ==
- Municipalities of Michoacán
