= Pascual Sigala =

Mexican politician (1968–2020)

- Born: 28 January 1968; Durango, Mexico
- Died: 26 May 2020 (aged 52)
- Other name: Pascual Sigala
- Education: Ingeniero Agrónomo
- Occupation: Politician
- Political party: PRD
- Spouse: Adriana Hernández Íñiguez

Pascual Sigala Páez (28 January 1968 – 26 May 2020) was a Mexican politician affiliated with the Party of the Democratic Revolution (PRD). In the 2003 mid-terms he was elected to the Chamber of Deputies to represent Michoacán's third district during the 59th Congress. He was a congressman at both the local and federal levels, Secretary of Social Development and was Secretary of State of Michoacán until the end of March 2019.
