= Senguio =

- Municipality
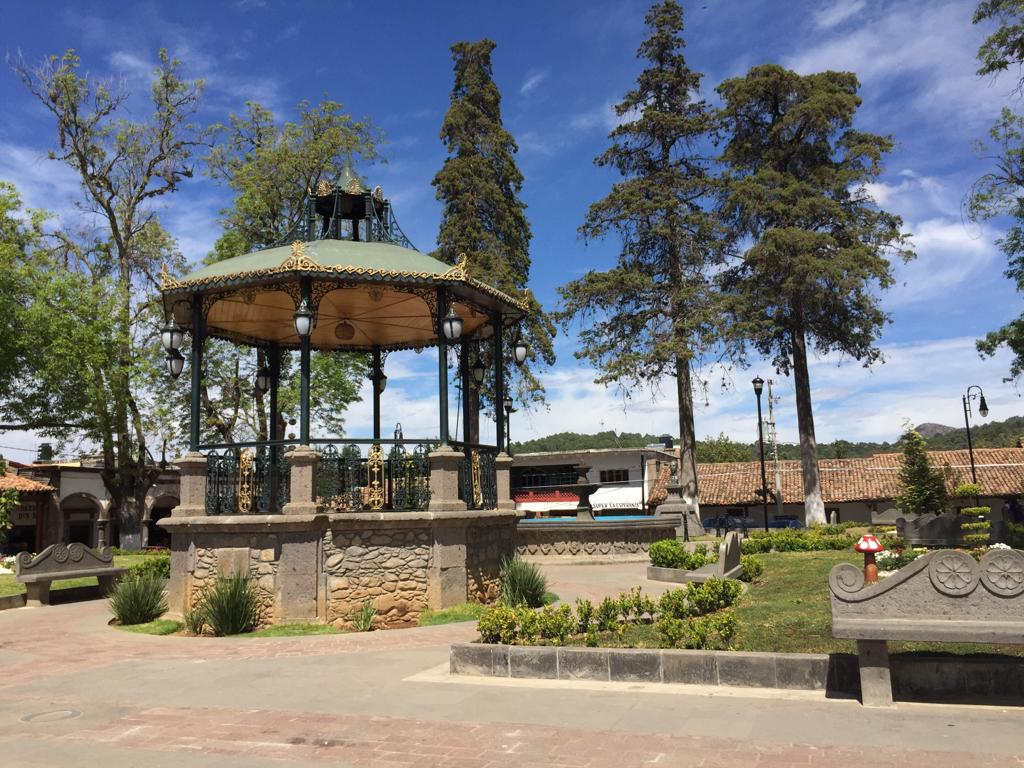
- The plaza de armas in Senguio

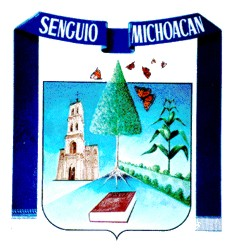
- Coat of arms

- Location of Senguio Senguio (Mexico)
- Coordinates: 19°43′58″N 100°21′08″W
- Country: Mexico
- State: Michoacán
- Established: 26 April 1856
- Seat: Senguio

Government
  - President: Rodolfo Quintana Trujillo

Area
  - Total: 257.741 km^{2} (99.514 sq mi)
- Elevation (of seat): 2,268 m (7,441 ft)

Population (2010 Census)
  - Total: 18,427
  - Estimate (2015 Intercensal Survey): 19,146
  - Density: 71.494/km^{2} (185.17/sq mi)
  - Seat: 2,707
- Time zone: UTC-6 (Central)
- Postal codes: 61290–61297
- Area code: 786
- Website: Official website

Senguio is a municipality in the Mexican state of Michoacán. It is located approximately 90 kilometres (56 mi) east of the state capital of Morelia.

== Geography ==
The municipality of Senguio is located at an elevation between 2,100 and 3,400 metres (6,900–11,200 ft) in the Sierra de Mil Cumbres mountain range in northeastern Michoacán. It borders the Michoacanese municipalities of Maravatío to the north, Tlalpujahua to the east, Angangueo to the south, Aporo to the southwest, and Irimbo to the west. It also borders the municipality of San José del Rincón in the State of Mexico to the southeast. The municipality covers an area of 257.741 square kilometres (99.514 sq mi) and comprises 0.44% of the state's area.

As of 2009, the land cover in Senguio consists of temperate forest (48%) and grassland (12%). Another 38% of the land is used for agriculture and 0.8% consists of urban areas. Most of Senguio drains into the Lerma River, while the southernmost part of the municipality is located in the basin of the Cutzamala River, a tributary of the Balsas River. The forests in the southeastern part of the municipality are protected as part of the Monarch Butterfly Biosphere Reserve.

Senguio has a temperate climate with rain in the summer. Average temperatures in the municipality range between 8 and 18 °C (46–64 °F), and average annual precipitation ranges between 800 and 1,100 millimetres (31–43 in).

Climate data for Senguio weather station at 19°43′58″N 100°21′08″W, 2260 m above sea level (1981–2010 averages, 1951–2010 extremes)
Month	Jan	Feb	Mar	Apr	May	Jun	Jul	Aug	Sep	Oct	Nov	Dec	Year
Record high °C (°F)	29.5 (85.1)	33.0 (91.4)	34.0 (93.2)	38.0 (100.4)	38.0 (100.4)	38.0 (100.4)	31.0 (87.8)	35.0 (95.0)	33.0 (91.4)	35.0 (95.0)	29.5 (85.1)	29.5 (85.1)	38.0 (100.4)
Mean daily maximum °C (°F)	21.9 (71.4)	23.3 (73.9)	25.5 (77.9)	27.4 (81.3)	28.6 (83.5)	25.4 (77.7)	23.1 (73.6)	23.6 (74.5)	23.5 (74.3)	24.0 (75.2)	23.2 (73.8)	22.0 (71.6)	24.3 (75.7)
Daily mean °C (°F)	12.9 (55.2)	14.1 (57.4)	16.0 (60.8)	18.1 (64.6)	19.6 (67.3)	18.5 (65.3)	17.0 (62.6)	17.0 (62.6)	16.8 (62.2)	16.0 (60.8)	14.4 (57.9)	13.0 (55.4)	16.1 (61.0)
Mean daily minimum °C (°F)	3.9 (39.0)	4.9 (40.8)	6.4 (43.5)	8.8 (47.8)	10.6 (51.1)	11.6 (52.9)	10.9 (51.6)	10.4 (50.7)	10.1 (50.2)	8.1 (46.6)	5.6 (42.1)	4.0 (39.2)	7.9 (46.2)
Record low °C (°F)	−6.5 (20.3)	−5.0 (23.0)	−2.0 (28.4)	0.0 (32.0)	5.0 (41.0)	0.0 (32.0)	5.0 (41.0)	2.0 (35.6)	0.5 (32.9)	1.0 (33.8)	−2.5 (27.5)	−2.0 (28.4)	−6.5 (20.3)
Average precipitation mm (inches)	10.4 (0.41)	5.6 (0.22)	7.1 (0.28)	10.4 (0.41)	84.7 (3.33)	145.1 (5.71)	235.6 (9.28)	216.8 (8.54)	148.4 (5.84)	99.2 (3.91)	12.0 (0.47)	10.7 (0.42)	986.0 (38.82)
Average rainy days (≥ 1 mm)	1.0	1.6	0.8	1.8	7.3	15.1	20.9	19.9	12.8	8.0	2.3	1.4	92.9
Source: Servicio Meteorológico Nacional

== History ==
The place name Senguio is of Purépecha origin, meaning "limits". Prior to the arrival of the Spanish, Senguio was located in the frontier region between the Purépecha and Aztec Empire and was inhabited by Mazahua tribes. The area was conquered by Cristóbal de Olid in 1522, and during the colonial period, the land was taken from the native inhabitants and incorporated into the Spanish haciendas, gradually leading to the disappearance of the indigenous peoples.

After Mexican independence, Senguio was made a part of the municipality of Irimbo in 1831. It became an independent municipality in 1856. It was re-incorporated into Irimbo in 1863, but re-established as a municipality in 1868.

== Administration ==
The municipal government of Senguio comprises a president, a councillor (Spanish: síndico), and seven trustees (regidores), four elected by relative majority and three by proportional representation. The current president of the municipality is Rodolfo Quintana Trujillo.

== Demographics ==
In the 2010 Mexican Census, the municipality of Senguio recorded a population of 18,427 inhabitants living in 4153 households. The 2015 Intercensal Survey estimated a population of 19,146 inhabitants in Senguio.

There are 55 localities in the municipality, of which only the municipal seat Senguio is classified as urban. It recorded a population of 2707 inhabitants in the 2010 Census.

== Economy ==
Agriculture is the main economic activity in Senguio. Crops grown include corn and oats.
