= Angangueo =

Angangueo, Michoacán
- Municipality
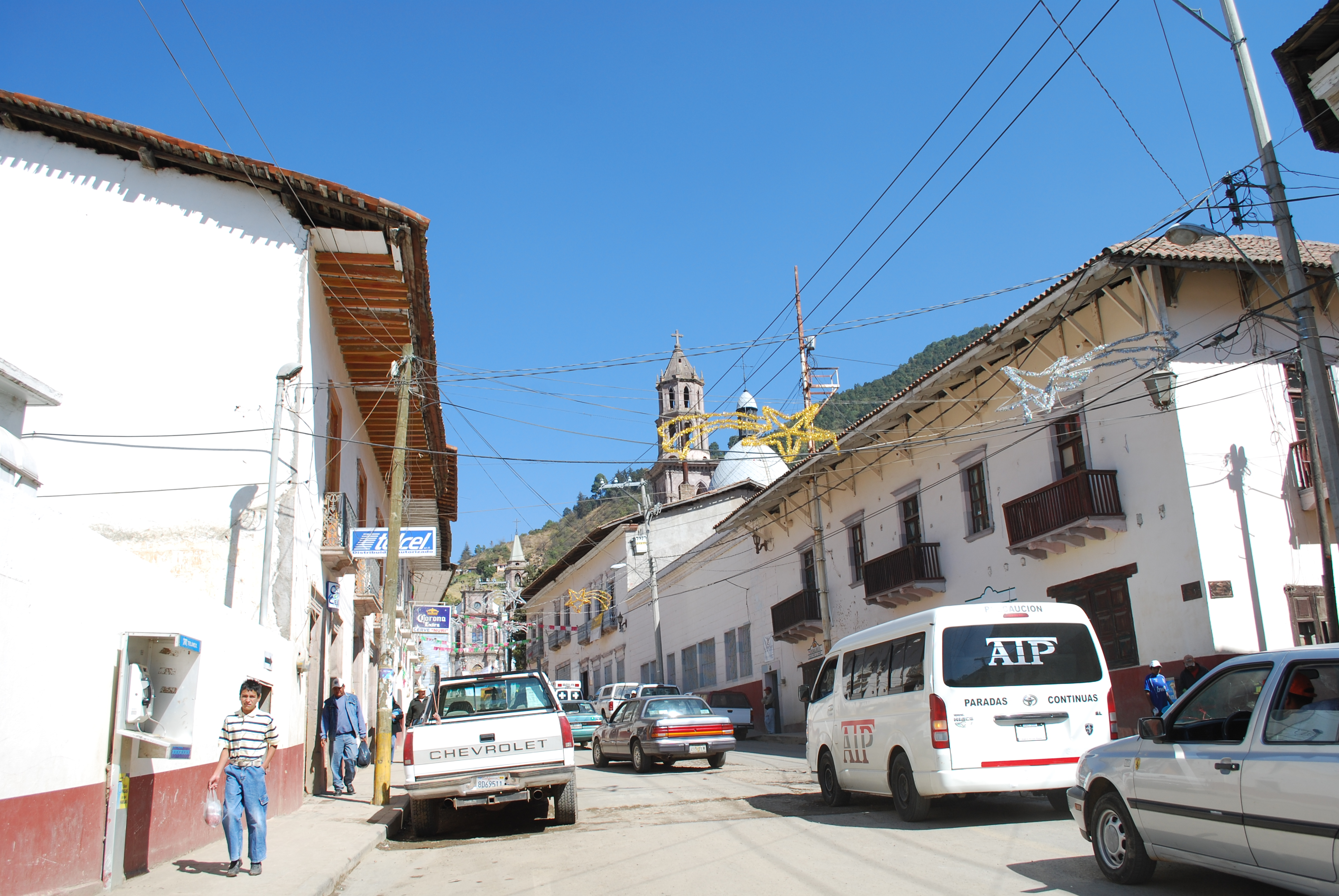
- Main street of the town

- Location in Mexico Angangueo, Michoacán (Mexico)
- Coordinates: 19°37′N 100°17′W
- Country: Mexico
- State: Michoacán
- Municipal Seat: Mineral de Angangueo
- Town Founded: 1792
- Municipality Created: 1831

Government
  - Municipal President: Alfredo Olmos Moreno

Area
  - Municipality: 85.64 km^{2} (33.07 sq mi)
- Elevation (of seat): 2,560 m (8,400 ft)

Population (2005) Municipality
  - Municipality: 9,990
  - Seat: 5,030
- Time zone: UTC-6 (Central (US Central))
- Postal code (of seat): 51395

Angangueo (Spanish: [aŋɡaŋˈɡeo]) is a municipality located in far eastern Michoacán state in central Mexico noted for its history of mining and its location in the Monarch Butterfly Biosphere Reserve. The municipal seat is the Mineral de Angangueo. It is located in high rugged forested mountains, with the town in a small canyon.

The town was officially founded shortly after a large mineral deposit was discovered in the area in the very late 18th century. The mines gave out in the 20th century, but promotion of the area due to its proximity to two butterfly sanctuaries has brought in some tourism.

== The town ==
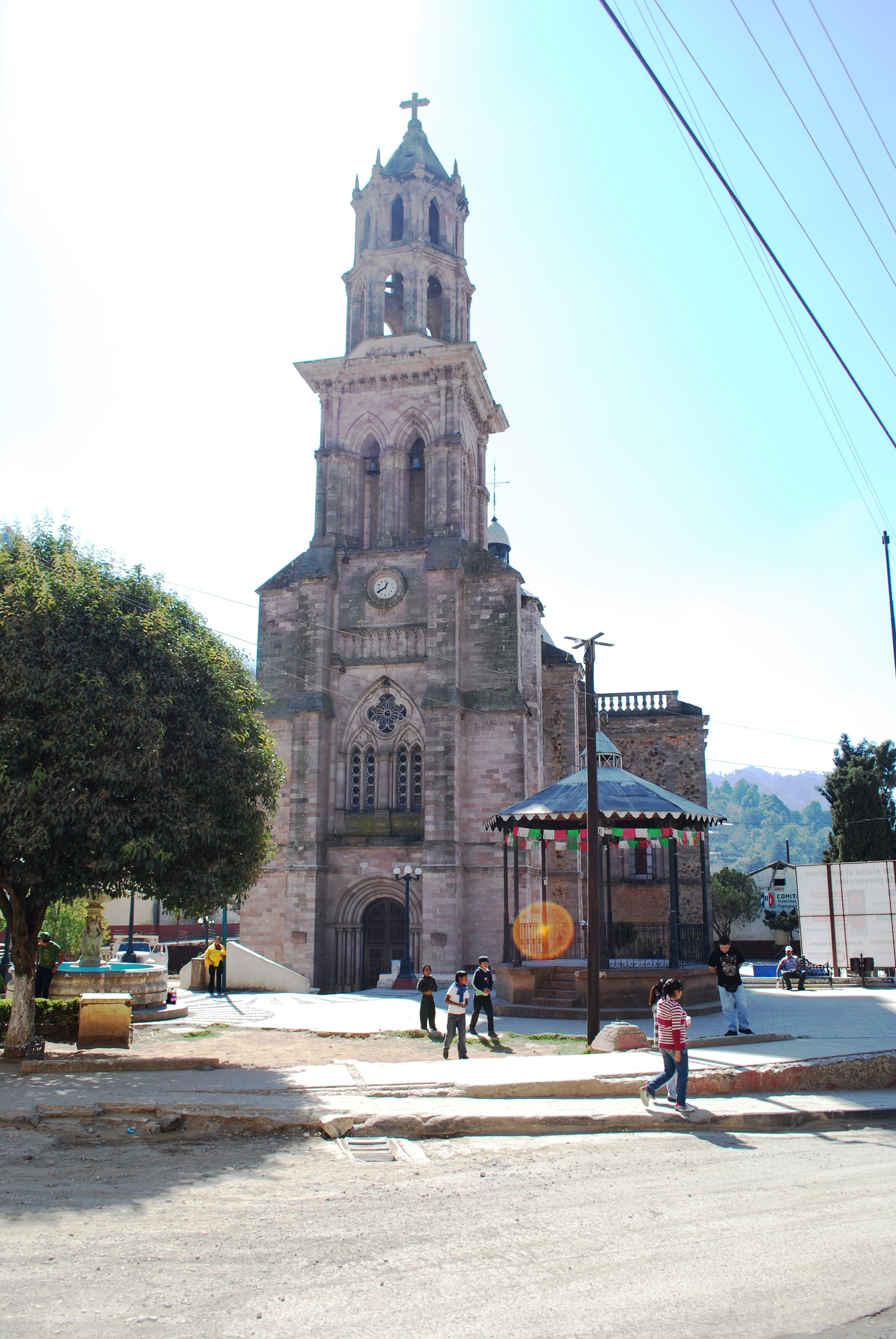
Inmaculada Concepción Church

The town of Angangueo is officially called Mineral de Angangueo to distinguish it from the rest of the municipality. Like most mining towns, Anguangueo has an irregular layout of its streets and blocks, which has remained the same since colonial times. There is one main road, which is called both Nacional and Morelos. This road leads up the canyon and ends at the Plaza de la Constitución. Most of the houses around the town are made of adobe with wood details and red tile roofs. There are also balconies which contain pots with flowers in the summer. Like a number of other mining towns from the same epoch, there are a number of tunnels that connect buildings, like the one that connects the Casa Parker with the Inmaculada Concepción church.

The main plaza is flanked by two churches: the parish of San Simón and the Inmaculada Concepcíon. The clocks on the two churches often show different times. The Inmaculada Concepción church was built by a single family, in pink stone in Gothic style to imitate in miniature the Notre Dame Cathedral in Paris. The main altar was made of marble from Italy, with images of Saint Joseph and the Virgin Mary from Paris. The tabernacle contains the "chalice of Angangueo," an important example of Baroque silverwork. The San Simon parish is smaller, built with blue-grey stone. Other chapels include Santa Maria Gorita, Misericordia and Jesus Nazareno.

The Casa Parker was an old train station. In the mid-20th century, it became the home of Bill and Joyce Parker, an English/American couple. Bill was the last mine administrator of the American Smelting and Refining Company before the mines were nationalized. The couple became part of the community and eventually their house was preserved and made into a historical museum. Another museum in the area is the El Molino.

The Monument to the Miner is located on a lookout over the town and the Señor del Rescate Chapel, which is now the site of municipal offices. While residents in and around the town still extract some lead and silver from the hillsides, the town is best known for being in the middle of much of the Monarch Butterfly Biosphere Reserve, with two sanctuaries open to the public nearby: Sierra Chincua and El Rosario. The town's association with the butterflies came when magazines such as National Geographic and México Desconocido began promoting it, along with neighboring Ocampo. The town hosts an annual monarch butterfly festival each year in February to bid goodbye as the insects head north again. The festival consists of artistic and cultural events as well as those related to the region's traditions and customs. Another annual cultural event is the Day of the Miner on 11 July, which is held to honor a way of life that many in the town do not wish to lose. The rest of the municipality's annual festivals are religious including the feasts of Santa Cruz on May 3, San Simon on October 28 and the Immaculate Conception on December 8.

There is bus service between Angangueo and Zitácuaro.

== The municipality ==
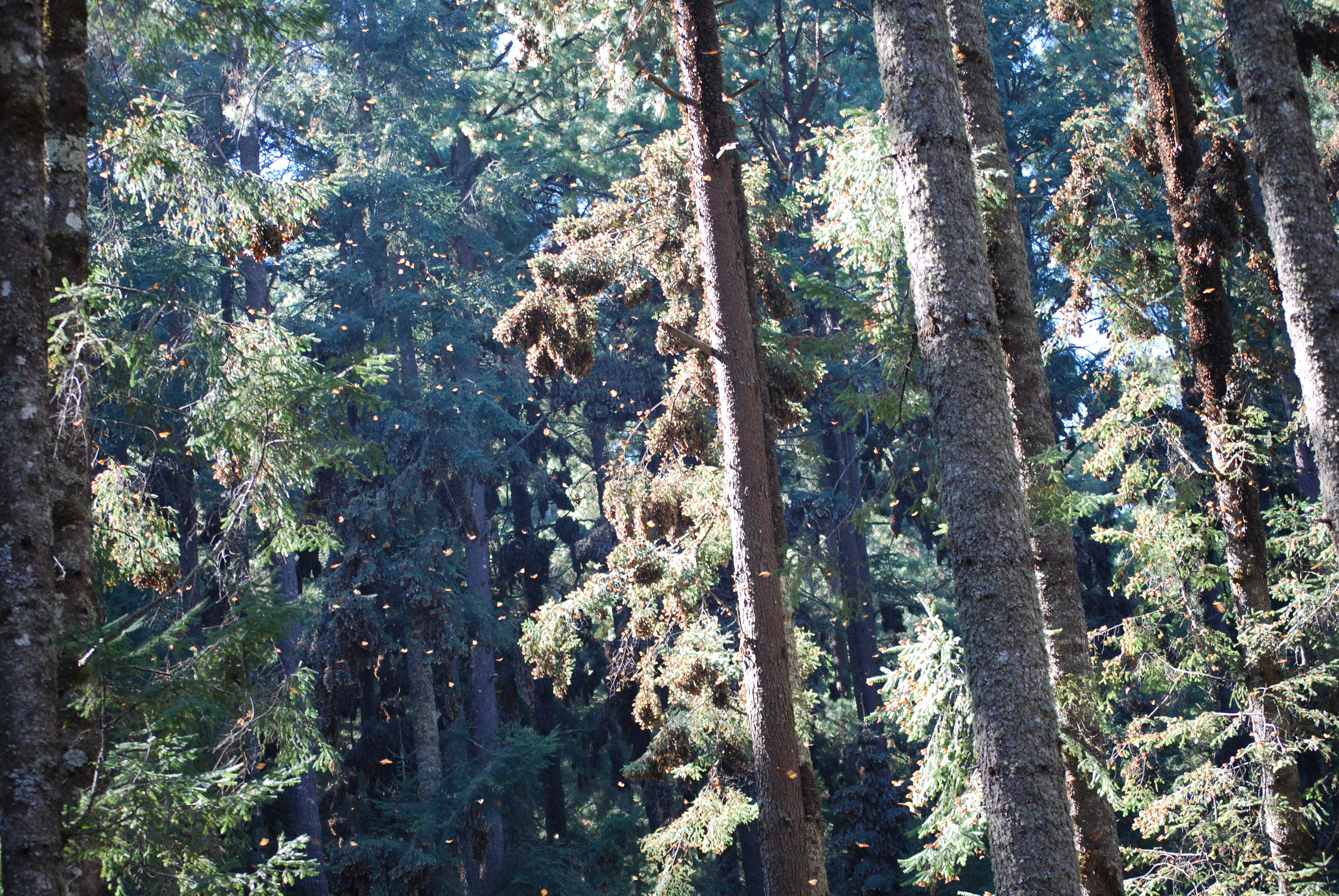
Monarchs at the Cerro Prieto Sanctuary in Angangueo

As municipal seat, the town of Angangueo is the local government for about thirty other communities, which together make up a territory of 85.64km2. About half of the municipal population of 9990 (2005) lives in the town proper Other important communities include Colonia Independencia, Jesús Nazareno, Catingón and La Estación. It is located in the far northeast of the state and is part of the Tlalpujahua region. It is bordered by the municipalities of Senguio, Ocampo and Aporo with the State of Mexico to the east. It is mostly rural with just over 2,000 housing units and some public sports facilities in the seat and several other communities. It is directly connected by road to neighboring municipalities of Aporo and Tlalpujahua.

The municipality has preschool, primary, middle and vocational schools. The latter two are mostly provided by distance education. Public schools in the municipality include 11 de Julio pre school, 25 de Abril preschool, Benito Juarez preschool, Carmen Serdan preschool, Cbtis 18 vocational highschool, Educacion y Patria primary school, Patito Feo preschool, Emiliano Zapata primary, Escuela Primaria primary, Escuela Telesecundaria Estv 16 314 middle school, Escuela Telesecundaria Estv 16 735 middle school and Escuela Secundaria Tecnica 2 middle school. There is one private primary school called Corregidora.

== Economy ==
Tourism related to the butterflies accounts for over one quarter of the municipality's economy, however it is mostly limited to the municipal seat, which makes most of its living from tourism and commerce. Most of the rest of the land is used for forestry, both legally and illegally. Much of the illegal logging is done on biosphere lands and by organized groups, which have fought back against the operations mounted against them by state and federal authorities.

Another quarter of the economy is from agriculture with corn and wheat as the principal crops, along with barley, beans and fava beans. Other crops include apples, peaches, pulque maguey, pears, and capulin. Livestock such as cattle, pigs, sheep and domestic fowl accounts for about five percent. It is the major source of income for a number of communities. There is still some very limited mining of copper, zinc, lead, iron, silver and gold, with some food processing and metal products.

According to the 2005 census, there were sixteen people in the municipality who spoke an indigenous language, mostly Mazahua and Mixe. The dominant religion is Catholicism.

== History ==
There is no agreement as to the origin of the name. It has been translated as "entrance to the cave," "very high thing" and "inside the forest." The municipality has its own coat of arms divided into three sections. One has symbols referring to mining, the second with a representation of a monarch butterfly and the third with mountains and the sun representing the terrain.

When Nuño de Guzmán arrived to the area in 1550, he described it as a "no-man's land" with no indication of the riches that were underneath the mountains and forests here. The lands were awarded to Gonzalo de Salazar by viceroy Antonio de Mendoza as part of a larger area encompassing Zitácuaro and Taximaroa shortly thereafter. Some mining and settlement began in the mid-16th century, but it remained relatively unpopulated until the very late 18th century, when large deposits of minerals were discovered on what is now called the former hacienda of Angangueo. These minerals included gold, silver, copper and more and brought a rush of people into the area. The town of Angangueo was officially founded in 1792 and it became a municipality in 1831.

During the struggle between Conservative and Liberal forces in Mexico in the 19th century, possession of the town changed hands. In 1865, General Régules took the town plaza for Conservative forces but Liberal forces retook the town the following year. The Temple of the Inmaculata Concepcion was begun in 1882.

In the middle of the 19th century, mining rights were assigned to an English company called Negociación Minera de las Trojes. In the 20th century, it was then conceded to the U.S. company American Smelting and Refining Company, the last foreign concern to have mining rights. In 1953, an accident in the Dolores Mine claimed twenty five miners and the federal government expropriated the area. It was then managed by the Impulsora Minera de Angangueo, which continued mining here until 1991, when it was decided that the exploitation of the mines was no longer economically feasible. From then to the present, there have been disputes between the shareholders in the Impulsora and former miners and the state of Michoacan over the right to continue mining. The mines are considered to be part of the butterfly reserve.

In the mid-20th century, the town had a population of 10,000, its own newspaper and even a mint. However, it has steadily declined since then as the mines gave out. The town gained a new source of income with tourism with the establishment of the Monarch Butterfly Biosphere Reserve and the promotion of the butterfly colonies located very near the town by magazines such as National Geographic and Mexico Desconocido, beginning in 1980. This has promoted the opening of hotels and restaurants near the butterfly sites, and small transport services thereto. However, this has not brought the town back to its former size.

== Geography ==
It is very mountainous terrain with an average altitude of 2,580 meters (8,460 ft). Its geography is part of the Trans-Mexican Volcanic Belt and the Sierra de Angangueo. Two rivers pass through, the Puerco and the Carrillos along with several arroyos. Angangueo has a spring like climate. Some areas receive rains only in the summer and other all year round. It is mostly covered in forests of conifers with pines, oyamel and juniper as well as mixed forests of conifers such as cedar with broad-leafed trees. Wildlife include weasels, rabbits, squirrels, skunks, deer and various birds. Much of the municipality is part of the Monarch Butterfly Biosphere Reserve, especially Cerro de las Papas, which contains a major colony of the butterflies each winter.

=== Environmental concerns ===
On 5 February 2010, heavy rains and hail caused flooding and mudslides in the region, with Angangueo being hard hit. Landslides on two of the hills surrounding the town buried sections and blocked roads. The week prior a smaller slide had killed three miners. The slides forced the evacuation of hundreds, due to the danger of more slides. The Topos de Tlatelolco assisted with the search for survivors and bodies. At least 1,000 persons were made homeless and moved to a shelter in San José del Rincón, Mexico State. Many houses built on the riverbanks were swept away. At least thirty were killed by the event in the town alone. Bodies were found in the municipal seat and in smaller communities such as Salitre. 2,500 people lost everything in the disaster.

President Calderón visited the disaster area and toured some of the attractions, both on the ground and by air. He was accompanied by Michoacan's governor Leonel Godoy to survey the damage. As an alternative to mining, Calderón suggested developing tourism in Angangueo as a Pueblo Mágico. However, residents demanded the assurance that the town would not disappear, and that jobs would be available.

According to the director of the Forest Commission of Michoacan, Alejandro Méndez, deforestation from legal and illegal logging contributed to the landslides in 2010. In addition, cleared areas on hillsides were used to build homes. The landslides in Angangueo and in other areas such as Zamora have prompted studies by government authorities as to the causes of these events as well as the emergency responses.

Later in February, federal authorities announced that no new residents could move into the town and that the current population would be relocated. The decision was made with the rationale that the landslides create too big a hazard for people to live in the current location and a "New Angangueo" would be built. However, local residents were against the plan. Efforts to relocate the town were officially begun in June 2010, with a projected 600 homes in a location called Barrio Sustentable Monarca. The construction was halted by September of the same year, with only a layout traced on the site and no new homes started.

As tourism is being exploited, the Monarch Butterfly Biosphere Reserve runs higher risks of being disturbed as thousands of tourists walk the trails around the forest habitats of the butterfly each year. While the resident population demands other sources for economic stability, the government is implementing methods to boost tourism. No efforts have been made to officially moderate the physical establishments, entertainment, noise and vehicles which are prominently growing in the biosphere area.
