= Adriana Hernández Íñiguez =

Mexican politician

- Born: 20 July 1978 (age 48); La Piedad, Michoacán, Mexico
- Education: La Piedad Institute of Technology
- Political party: PRI
- Spouse: Pascual Sigala

Adriana Hernández Íñiguez (born 20 July 1978) is a Mexican politician affiliated with the PRI. She served as Deputy of the LXII Legislature of the Mexican Congress representing Michoacán.
