= Mario Vallejo Estévez =

Mexican politician

- Born: 28 May 1959 (age 66); Michoacán, Mexico
- Occupation: Politician
- Political party: PRD

Mario Vallejo Estévez (born 28 May 1959) is a Mexican politician affiliated with the Party of the Democratic Revolution (PRD). In the 2006 general election he was elected to the Chamber of Deputies to represent Michoacán's third district during the 60th Congress.
