= Dina Herrera Soto =

Mexican politician

- Born: 15 November 1959 (age 66); Tuxpan, Michoacán, Mexico
- Occupation: Politician
- Political party: PRI

María Dina Herrera Soto (born 15 November 1959) is a Mexican politician from the Institutional Revolutionary Party (PRI). In the 2009 mid-terms she was elected to the Chamber of Deputies to represent Michoacán's third district during the 61st Congress.
