= Tlalpujahua =

Tlalpujahua (de Rayón)
- Town and Municipality
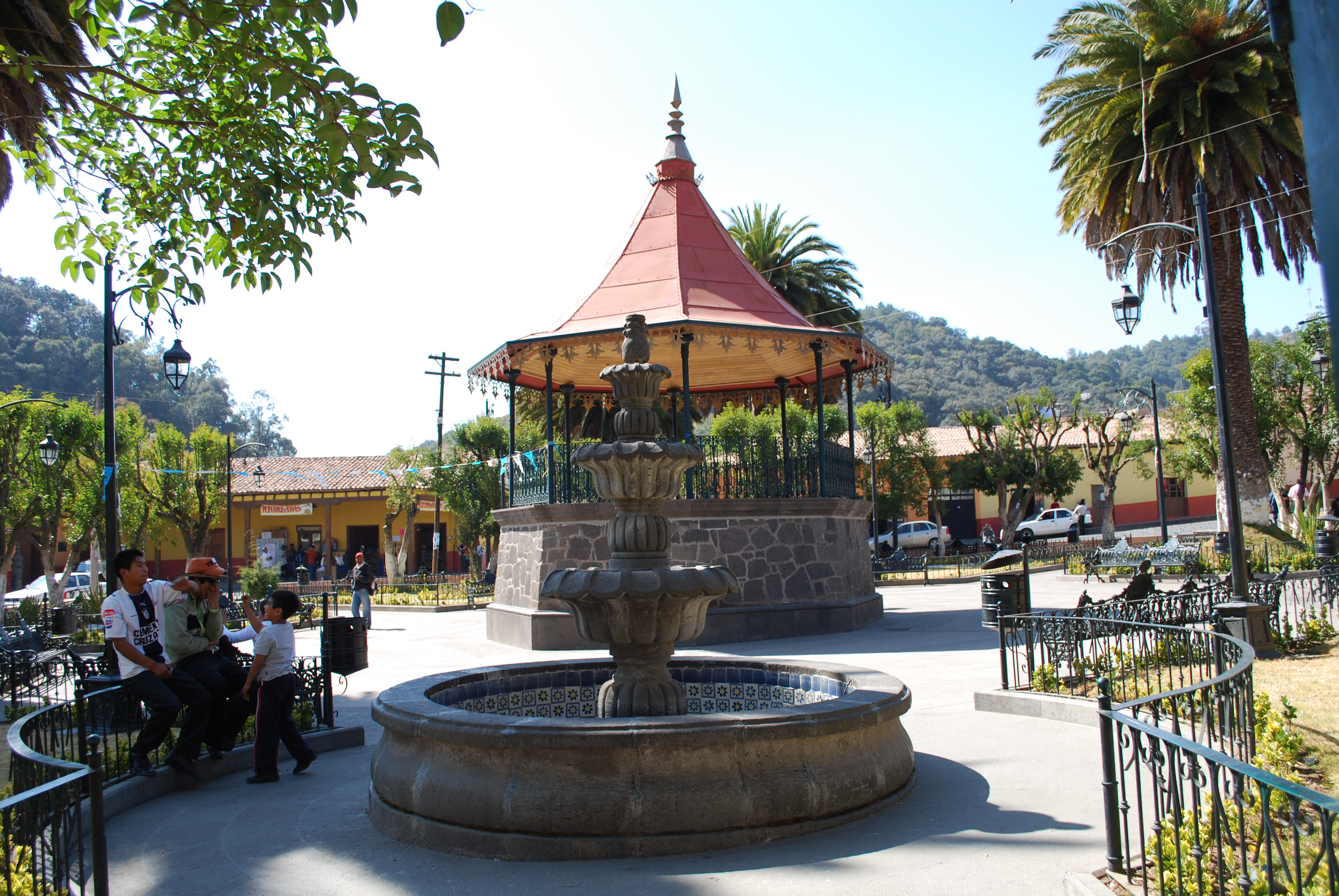
- Kiosk in the center of Tlalpujahua

- Location within Michoacán Location within Mexico
- Coordinates: 19°48′18″N 100°10′28″W
- Country: Mexico
- State: Michoacán
- Founded: 1560
- Municipal Status: 1822

Government
  - Municipal President: Moises García Alvarado

Area
  - Municipality: 190.86 km^{2} (73.69 sq mi)
- Elevation (of seat): 2,580 m (8,460 ft)

Population (2005) Municipality
  - Municipality: 25,373
  - Seat: 3,704
- Time zone: UTC-6 (Zona Centro)
- Postal code (of seat): 61060
- Website: (in Spanish) www.tlalpujahua.com

Tlalpujahua (Spanish pronunciation: [tlalpuˈxawa]; formally Tlalpujahua de Rayón) is a town and municipality located in the far northeast of the state of Michoacán in central Mexico. It is a former mining town, home of the Dos Estrellas Mine, which was the leading producer of gold in the early 20th century. A major landslide of mud and mining debris damaged this mine and buried about one-third of the town in 1937. Mining continued until 1959, but nationalization of the mine by President Cardenas in the 1930s led to the demise of the mine and impoverishment of the town. In the 1960s, a local by the name of Joaquín Muñoz Orta began making Christmas tree ornaments here. This eventually grew into what is now one of the largest producers of ornaments called Adornos Navideños SA de CV. In addition to this and another factory, there are about 150 small workshops dedicated to making Christmas items, with about 70% of the town's economy based on it.

In 2005, the town, with its narrow stone streets and adobe/stone houses with red tile roofs, was made a Pueblo Mágico as part of its efforts to attract tourism.

== The town ==
=== Mining town ===
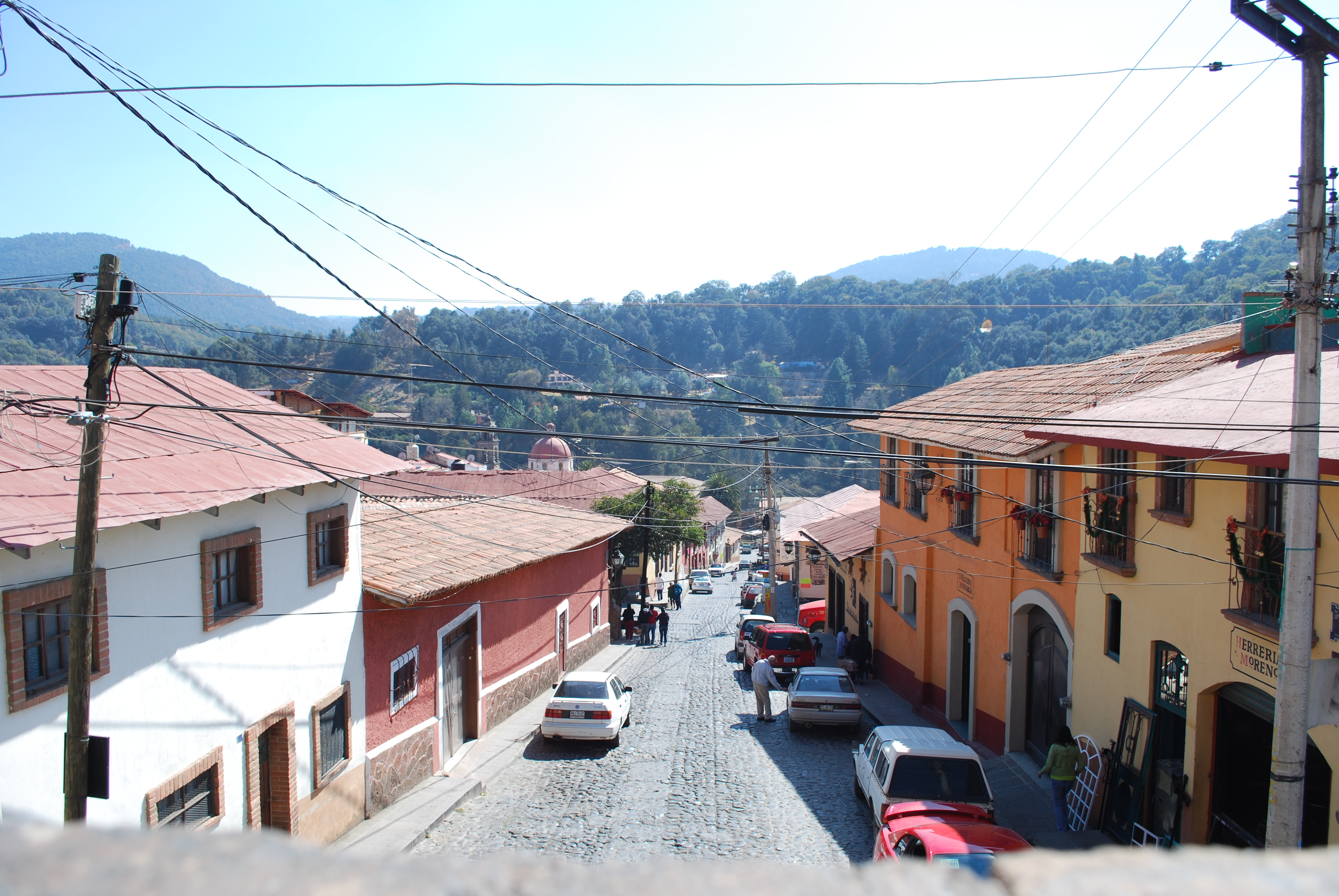
Looking over town from parish church

The town proper is small with only 3,704 residents (2005). It is filled with stone paved streets which rise and fall markedly, with the rugged terrain it is built on. Along the streets there are houses with thick walls made of adobe and/or pink sandstone, topped with peaked roofs covered in red tile. A number has wooden balconies and other wood details and look like chalets. The houses are built this way due to the winter months which are cold and sometimes snowy. (decarlan) Surrounding the town are rugged forested mountains. In 2005, Tlalpujahua became the 20th town to be declared a Pueblo Mágico, as part of its efforts to attract tourism. However, it is still quiet with few traffic problems despite the narrow streets.

Tlalpujahua's history is tied to mining, with the peak period for this activity spanning the very late 19th century to the 1930s, although mining had been done in this area since pre-Hispanic times. The major mine of the area was the Dos Estrellas Mine, which was established when a miner by the name of Nacho Ramírez found a rich vein, while employed by Frenchman Francois Joseph Fournier in 1898. This mine was the largest producer of gold, producing 45,000 kg (44 long tons; 50 short tons) of gold and 400,000 kg (394 long tons; 441 short tons) of silver. A major landslide caused damage to the mine in 1937. Nationalization of the mine by President Cardenas in the 1930s led to decreased investment and modernization that was previously provided by its private French owners, and the government controlled mine closed in 1959, devastating the economy of the town. Today, the mine has been converted into a museum called the Museo Tecnológico Minero Siglo 19. The exhibits are housed in the mine's original buildings, almost all of which have been preserved. The mine museum contains mining equipment and a collection of old photographs depicting the life and times of the area during its mining heyday, and is the first of its kind in Mexico. Some of the buildings also hold workshops and other events and others have been left as they were, such as the old mechanics shop, which is claimed to be where parts of the first airplane made in Mexico were forged. The garden areas of the museum contain sculptures made with materials found in the mine in forms such as butterflies and erupting volcanoes. They were made by Gustavo Bernal, the director of the museum and the one to bring the museum into existence. The museum also has a bookshop and café. http://www.museominadosestrellas.com.mx

=== Christmas tree ornaments ===
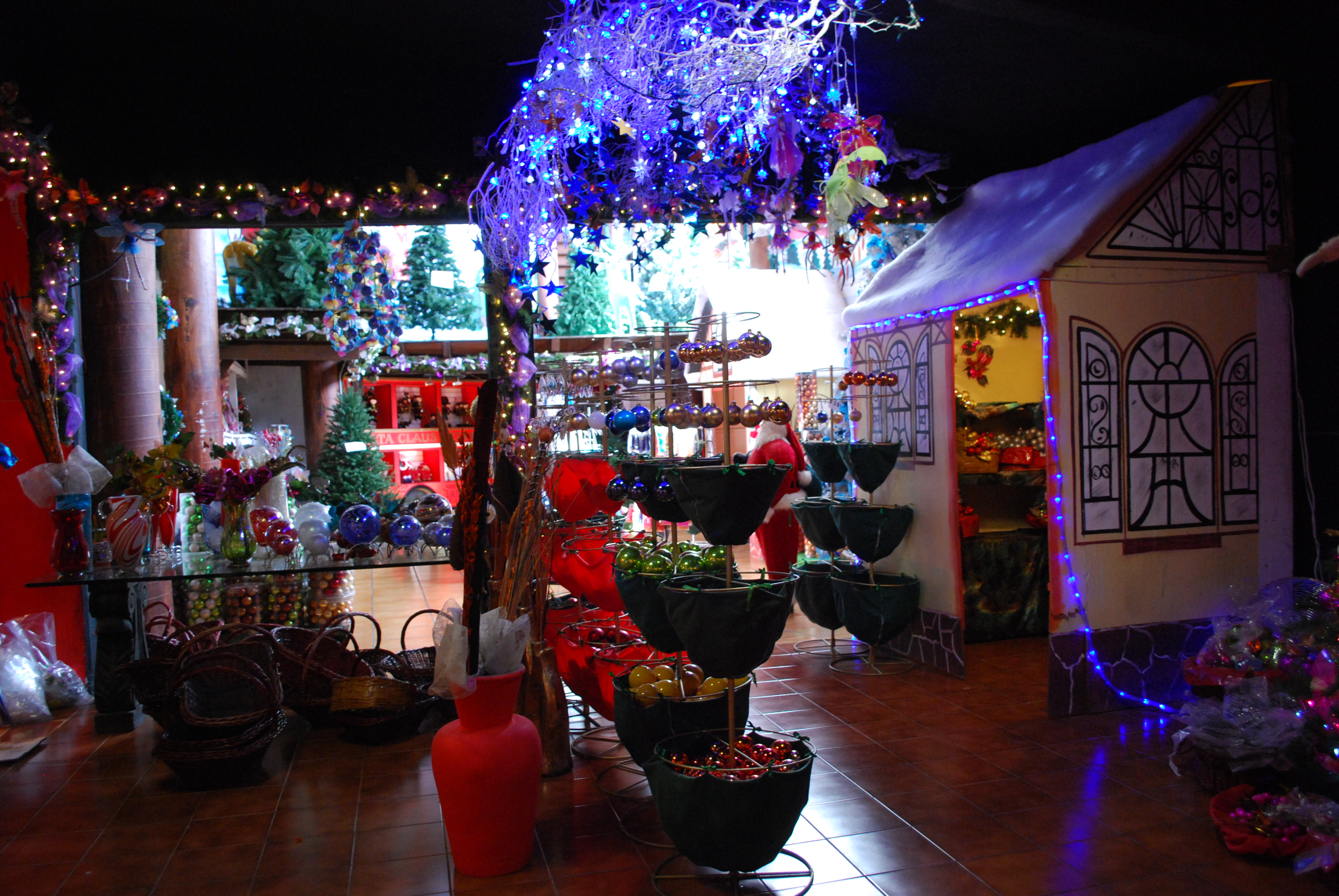
Inside Casa de Santa Claus shop

Tlalpujahua is one of a number of former mining communities in this area, along with Angangueo and El Oro, Mexico State. What sets it apart is that it has become a major producer of Christmas tree ornaments, especially glass spheres. The industry began with Joaquín Muñoz Orta, who left his hometown with his family in the 1950s to Chicago, where he worked at a factory making artificial Christmas trees. He returned to Mexico in the early 1960s, but since there was still no work in Tlalpujahua, he went to Mexico City where he set up a small Christmas tree workshop with his family. They initially sold the trees in places such as the La Merced Market, but soon after they began to offer blown glass Christmas tree ornaments as well. These were more popular than the trees. By the end of the decade, they decided to move their workshop home to Tlalpujahua, which has since become Adornos Navideños SA de CV. Today, the company has about 1,000 employees, five plants and fifteen workshops. It is considered the largest such enterprise in Latin America,(esferas) and one of the five largest in the world. Each year, the factory produces about 38 million spheres, 26 million of which are exported.

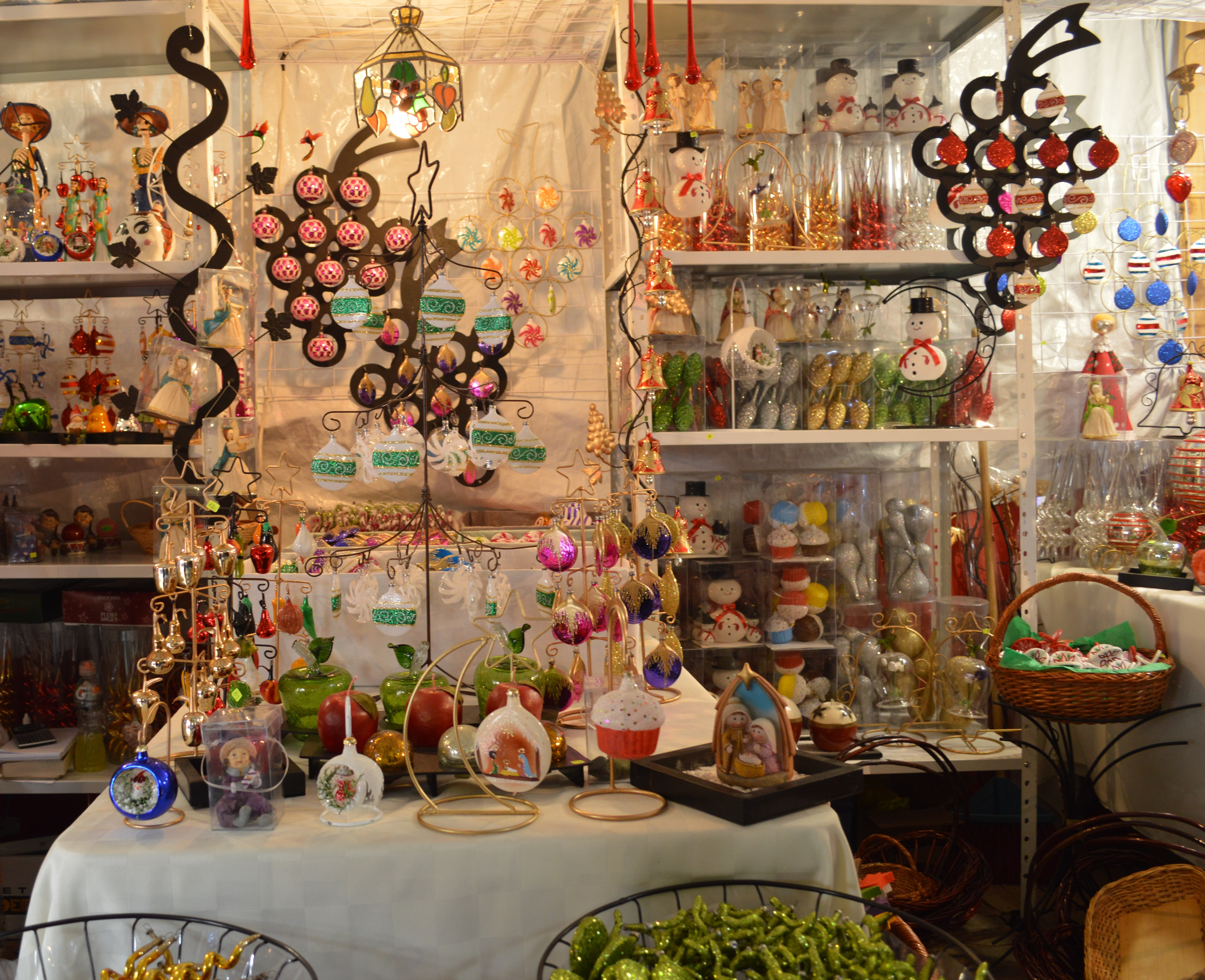
Stand at the 2016 Feria de la Esfera

This is one of two established large factories in the town. In addition, there are about 150 smaller workshops making various kinds of handcrafted Christmas decorations and most families in the area make them on the side at home. Even with large-scale production, creation of the glass spheres is still mostly artisanal, including the blowing of the glass and painting. Handcrafted spheres are blown, usually by men. When cool, the glass spheres are usually taken to be covered in a silver nitrate or similar solution, to give them a metallic look. Colors vary and include red, pink, yellow, blue gold and pearl. The classic ornaments are simple glass spheres but there are over a thousand different models available with shapes such as fruits, Santa Claus, pencils, dolls, snowmen, monkeys and many more. Workshops in the area have over 300 standard designs for the sphere, which include hearts, stars, harlequins, flowers, comets and more. Most of the painters are women. A number of the designs of the glass spheres are unique to the town. The creation of these glass spheres have given the town a reputation. Local authorities see the ornament industry as a way to stem emigration out of the area. The industry employs about 10,000 people, and accounts for about 70% of the town's economy. As of 2015, there were about 200 workshops in town that produced more than 100 million ornaments per year. From November to early December, the seat hosts an annual fair dedicated to Christmas decorations called the Arte Navideño. It exhibits ornaments, trees and other Christmas decorations. About 5% of the ornaments are sold during the fair, 35% in the rest of Mexico and about 60% are exported to countries such as the US, Canada, Argentina, Japan and Malaysia.

=== Churches ===
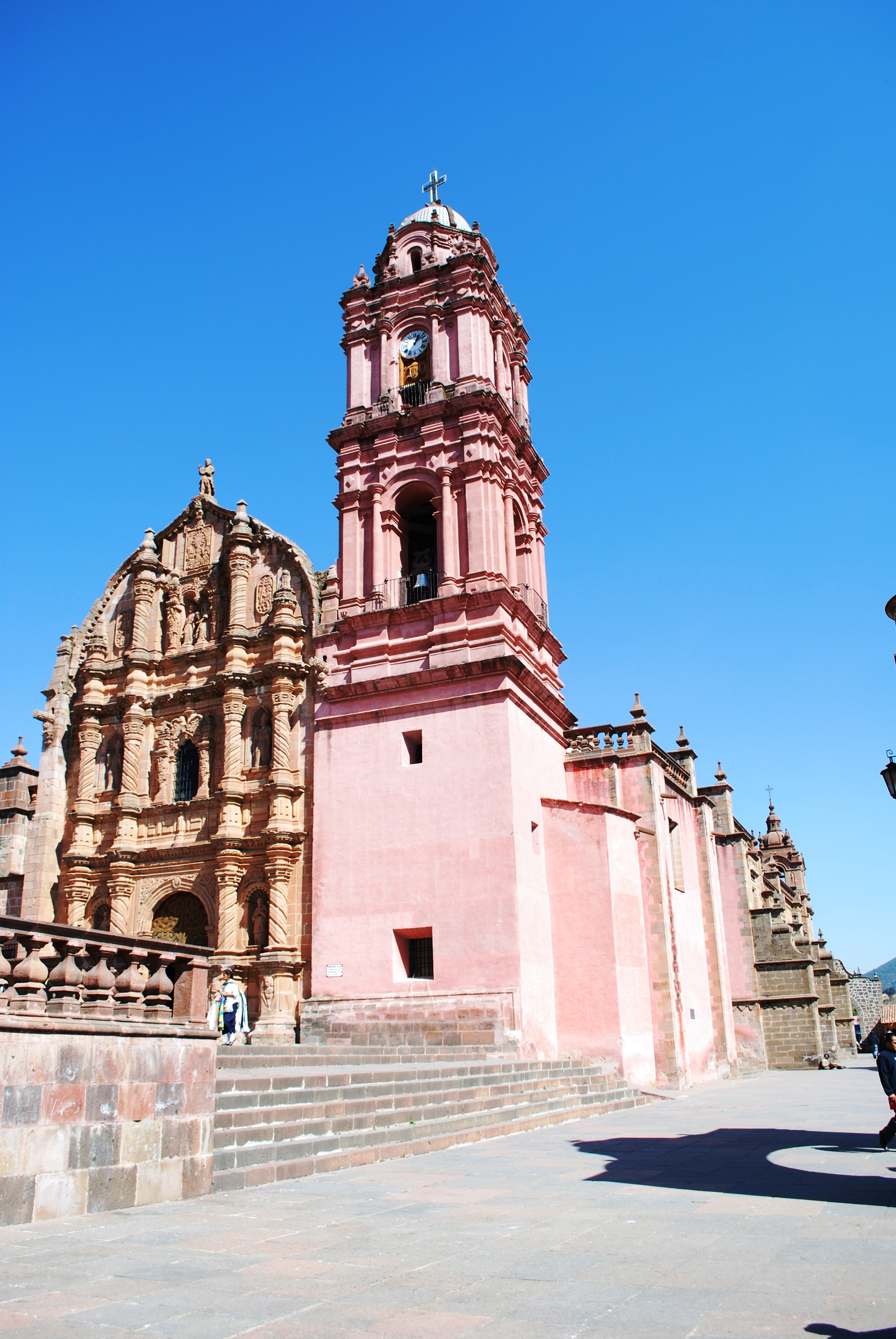
Facade of the Parish of San Pedro y San Pablo/Del Carmen Sanctuary

The main church of the town is alternately called the Parish of San Pedro y San Pablo or the Del Carmen Sanctuary/Temple. The Santuario del Carmen was formerly dedicated to Saints Peter and Paul. It was constructed in the first half of the 18th century, when mining in the area was good by Felipe Neri Valleza. It originally had rich Baroque ornamentation both inside and out. Today, one can still see the Baroque portal of two levels and a crest that forms a pinnacle. The levels are divided by paths which guard religious figures in its niches. In 2009, outside lights were installed to illuminate the church as part of efforts to bring tourism to the town as a Pueblo Mágico. The interior's original decoration, including its original five Baroque altars were destroyed and redone between 1858 and 1871. The last remodeling of the interior came in the late 19th and very early 20th centuries. The project was sponsored by Father José María Galván and done by artisan Joaquín Orta Menchaca, using new techniques to sculpt flowers, other vegetative motifs, mouldings and more in plaster and ceramic on the walls of the church. All of these and the remaining flat spaces on the walls and ceiling were painted in various colors. This style has been repeated in the Church of San Francisco in Tlalpujahua and the Sanctuary of Guadalupe in Morelia. At first glance the work of Orta Menchaca looks to be a late version of Baroque, but it is really an eclectic style. It is considered to be an original work and a contribution to Mexican art.

The church was originally dedicated to Saints Peter and Paul. Today, the main altar has an image of Our Lady of Mount Carmel painted on a portion of an adobe wall flanked by images of Saints Peter and Paul. The Mount Carmel image comes from a former chapel dedicated to her, which was built in the 16th century by hacienda owner Juan Galindo. The image itself dates back at least to the 18th century. In 1937, a major landslide buried much of the town's principle blocks, and killed over 400 people. All that can be seen from the buried area is the bell tower of the chapel. The wall on which the image was painted was also undamaged. According to local lore, the face of the image was also above the debris and the landslide stopped just short of the wall. The salvation of the image was considered to be a miracle. This adobe wall was carefully cut away from the rest of the ruined building and moved to the parish church over 1.5 km away. The project was realized by the residents themselves with an estimated 12,000 taking part in some way. In 1965, Our Lady of Mount Carmel was declared the patroness of the municipality and on 16 July, she is honored, bringing thousands to the church from in and around the municipality.

The monastery of San Francisco was built in Baroque style in the 17th century. It was home to poet Manuel Martínez de Navarrete, who is exhibited in effigie in the central courtyard. The Santiago Puxtla Church was built in the 16th century and its fronted by a graveyard. It is a simple construction which originally was a church for the local indigenous. It is still used by locals and one of its main events is Day of the Dead. The chapel of Señor Jesús del Monte is one of the oldest churches in the municipality. It contains a Christ image in “pasta de caña” (corn stalk paste), made using indigenous techniques.

=== Other landmarks and events ===
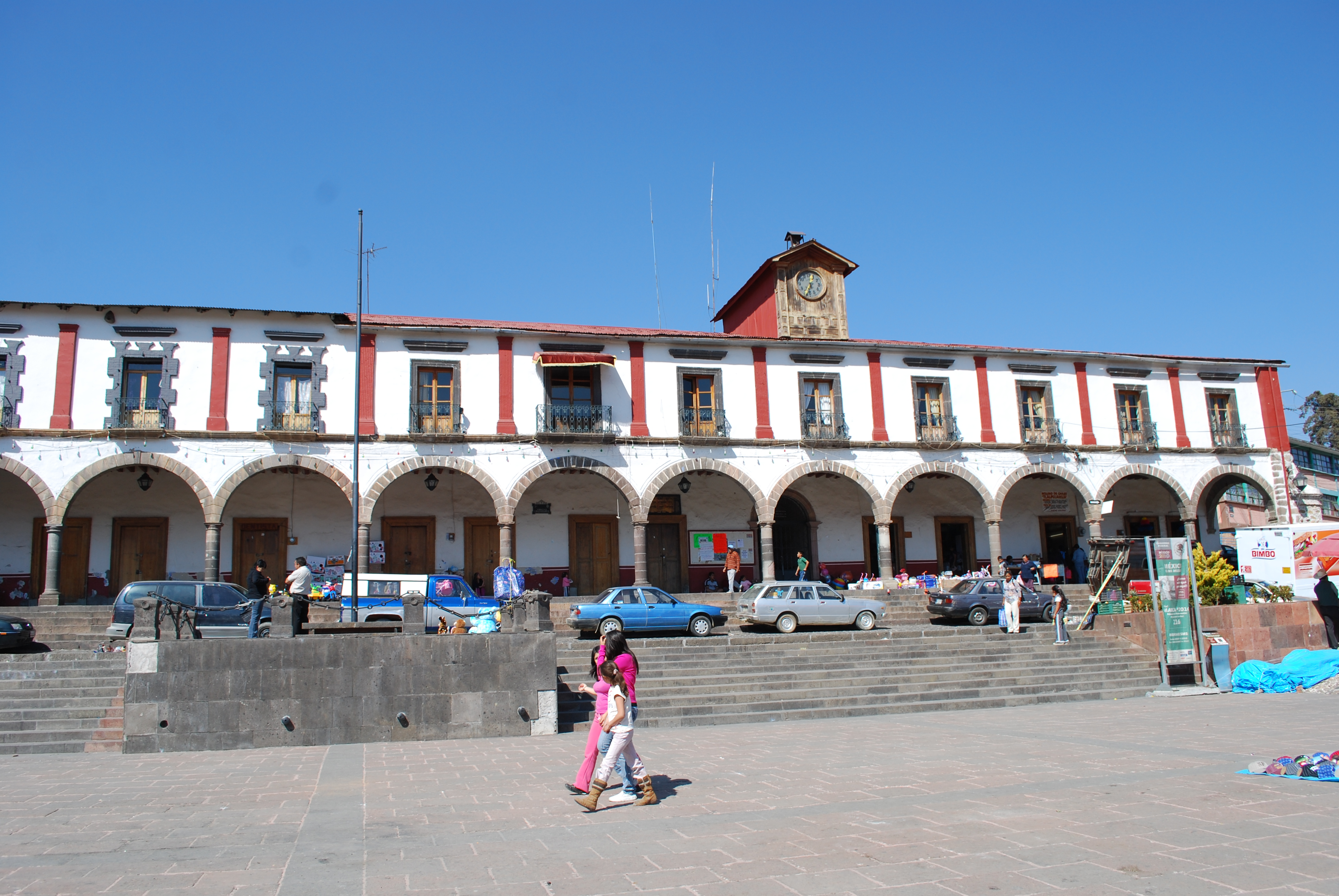
Municipal palace

The Casa de los López Rayón (Rayon House) is a museum dedicated to the town's mining past and the Rayon brothers’ role in the War of Independence. The museum was opened in 1973 and contains items such as photographs, machines, plans, utensils, helmets, archives and letters. On 13 November, local schools participate in parades and theatrical depiction about the Lopez Rayon brothers, Ignacio, Francisco, José María and Ramón.

The town's crafts and food are offered for sale, especially on Sunday, the weekly market day. Most craft items are related to Christmas, but other crafts such as locally made pre-Hispanic style feather work and items make of wood, brass, iron, stone and silver as well as pottery are available as well. One local workshop called La Estanzuela produces high fire ceramics. In the markets and restaurants in town popular dishes such as barbacoa, and “cabeza de res” (beef head), both traditionally cooked in adobe ovens, are available. Other common dishes include soups made with local mushrooms, preserved fruits and bread made with pulque, corundas, turkey in mole, pickled nopales and a sweet bread called pan de pucha.

Since 2008, at the end of the October, it hosts the annual Festival Internacional de Cine Fantástico y de Terror Mórbido (International Festival of Fantasy and Morbid Terror Cinema). While movies and film are featured, there are also events related to local culture, workshops, seminars, music and dance. The films are from both Mexico and abroad, from classics of the 1950s to new films. The event is sponsored by a number of organizations including Instituto Mexicano de Cinematografía, the Consejo Nacional para la Cultura y las Artes, the state of Michoacán and local authorities. Tlalpujahua is host to the most important horror film festival in Mexico. The films are shown in a number of venues, including the town's old theatre and even inside an old mine. The festival gives young filmmakers a chance to show their work and have it voted on by attendees. The 2010 festival paid homage to the Cardona family, which has made over one hundred films, many of which were of the horror and suspense variety. (morbido)

== The municipality ==
As municipal seat, the town of Tlalpujahua is the local governing authorities for about 80 named communities, which cover an area of 190.86 km^{2} (74 sq mi). The municipality has a total population of 25,373 (2005), but on 3,704 live in the town proper. The municipality is located in the far northeast of the state, and borders the municipalities of Contepec, Senguio and Maravatío with the State of Mexico to the east. It is 156 km from the capital of Morelia. The municipality is connected to Atlacomulco and Morelia via Federal Highway 126. There are state highways that link it to Venta de Bravo, Santa María de los Angeles and Angangueo. Other important communities include San Francisco de Los Reyes, Tlacotepec, Tlapujahuilla, San Pedro Taríbaro, Los Remedios and Santa María de los Angeles. As of 2005, there were only 49 people in the municipality that spoke an indigenous language, mostly Purépecha. While the municipality had a negative growth rate in the 1990s, due to emigration, it has since grown from 18,376 in 1995 to 25,373 in 2005. Almost all profess the Catholic faith with a small community of Evangelicals.

The municipality lies within the Trans-Mexican Volcanic Belt. It is mountainous dominated by the Sierra de Tlalpujahua, with peaks such as Somera, Campo del Gallp, Aguilas, San Miguel and Santa Maria. It has one river called the San José, with arroyos such as the Naranjas and Ciénega. There are also fresh water springs and two dams called the Brockman and the Estanzuela. It has a temperate climate with rain all year round. Average temperatures vary from 6.1 °C (43.0 °F) to 22.7 °C (72.9 °F). The municipality is dominated by forests of pine, oyamel and juniper with some areas having holm oak and cedar. Wildlife includes cacomixtle, raccoons, weasels, armadillos, and wild fowl. The area is part of a rugged mountain chain that separates the state of Michoacán from neighboring State of Mexico. Like neighboring areas such as Angangueo and El Oro, State of Mexico, it is an area historically rich in minerals. While not part of the Monarch Butterfly Biosphere Reserve, it is only 28 kilometres (17 mi) from the Sierra Chincua, which is the second most important sanctuary in the Reserve.

Mining is no longer performed in the municipality, although there are still deposits of gold, silver and copper. The most important economic activity now is industry, mostly the making of Christmas related items. This is concentrated in the town of Tlalpujahua and the community of San Francisco de Los Reyes, and accounts for 29% of GDP. Other products include pencil sharpeners, stone products and textiles. Agriculture and livestock is second in importance. Principle crops include corn, beans and fava beans. Livestock include cattle, pigs, sheep and domestic fowl. It accounts for twenty percent of economic activity. In recent years, the municipality has been making efforts to attract tourism including gaining the status of Pueblo Mágico in 2005. Commerce and services is limited to small and medium –sized enterprises catering to local and tourist needs.

Outside the municipal seat, there are a number of tourist attractions. The Hermanos Rayón National Park, also called the Campo del Gallo Park, was created in 1952 by President Miguel Alemán Valdés. This was the area in which the López Rayón brothers had their headquarters during the early War of Independence. At the highest point, there is a monument in their honor. Another ecotourism area is the Mineral Casa de Campo, located in a forest with oaks, holm oaks, oyamels and eucalyptus trees. The area offers cabins for up to twelve people and tours of nearby monarch butterfly sanctuaries. The Brockman Dam offers activities such as camping, mountain biking, skiing, canoeing and more. It is located 15 minutes outside the town.

== History ==
In pre-Hispanic times, the area was initially dominated by the Mazahuas, with Tlalpujahuac as its original name. This comes from Nahuatl and means spongy or flabby land. The Purépecha took over the area in 1460, but the Aztecs invaded under Axayacatl. The area remained a point of contention between the Aztec Empire and Purépecha Empire until the Spanish conquest of both empires.

After the Spanish conquest, the area was made part of the Tarimeo encomienda, under the control of Gaspar de Avila. Gold had been mined by the indigenous in the area before the Spanish arrived, and by 1558, the Spanish rediscovered mining in these mountains. This rediscovery brought an influx of Spanish settlement to the area and the mining camp took on the name of Real de Minas de Tlalpujahua in 1560. In 1570, it was named a “alcaldia mayor” (principal town) which was under the direct control of the viceroy. In 1593, the leader of the mining community, Gaspar de Solís, under orders from the viceroy, created the first parish for the indigenous, and traced out the first blocks of a formal Spanish town. In 1603, it was formally established. Around this time, chapels such as the Nuestra Señora del Carmen and San Lorenzo were constructed. The monastery and church of San Francisco was also established. After the bishopric of Michoacán was split from that of Mexico City, there was conflict again as to which Tlalpujahua belonged. Eventually, the interventions of Vasco de Quiroga made it part of Michoacán.

At the beginning of the 18th century, a fire destroyed part of the town, taking with it a number of important buildings and archives. A new parish church was constructed in 1750. By 1765, the parish also included the communities of San Miguel Tlacotepec, San Juan Tlalpujahuilla, Santa Maria, Nuestra Señora de los Remedios and San Pedro Tarimangacho. The early mines began to give out in 1769.

The town played a role in the early part of the Mexican War of Independence. Ignacio López Rayón formed an insurgent group after the death of Hidalgo called the Suprema Junta Nacional Americana in Zitácuaro. When royalist troops arrived to that city, he retreated to his hometown of Tlalpujahua and established his base of operations. Along with his brothers, he fortified the Cerro del Gallo Mountain, created arms and munitions and reestablished the armed insurgency. It is from here as well that Ignacio Rayon sent to José María Morelos a document called Elementos de nuestra Constitución (Elements of Our Constitution), which contained individual guarantees to be granted to those in insurgent held territories. They also set up a printing press at the site. However, in 1813, royalist troops took Tlalpujahua and forced the evacuation of the Cerro del Gallo. Another supporter of independence, Father Juan Antonio Romero was executed in the town, before Francisco López Rayón took it back in 1815. The war shattered the economy of the town, and most of its mines were abandoned. Despite this, it became a municipality in 1822. Mining was reactivated in 1825, with the arrival of the English, but it lasted only for three years.

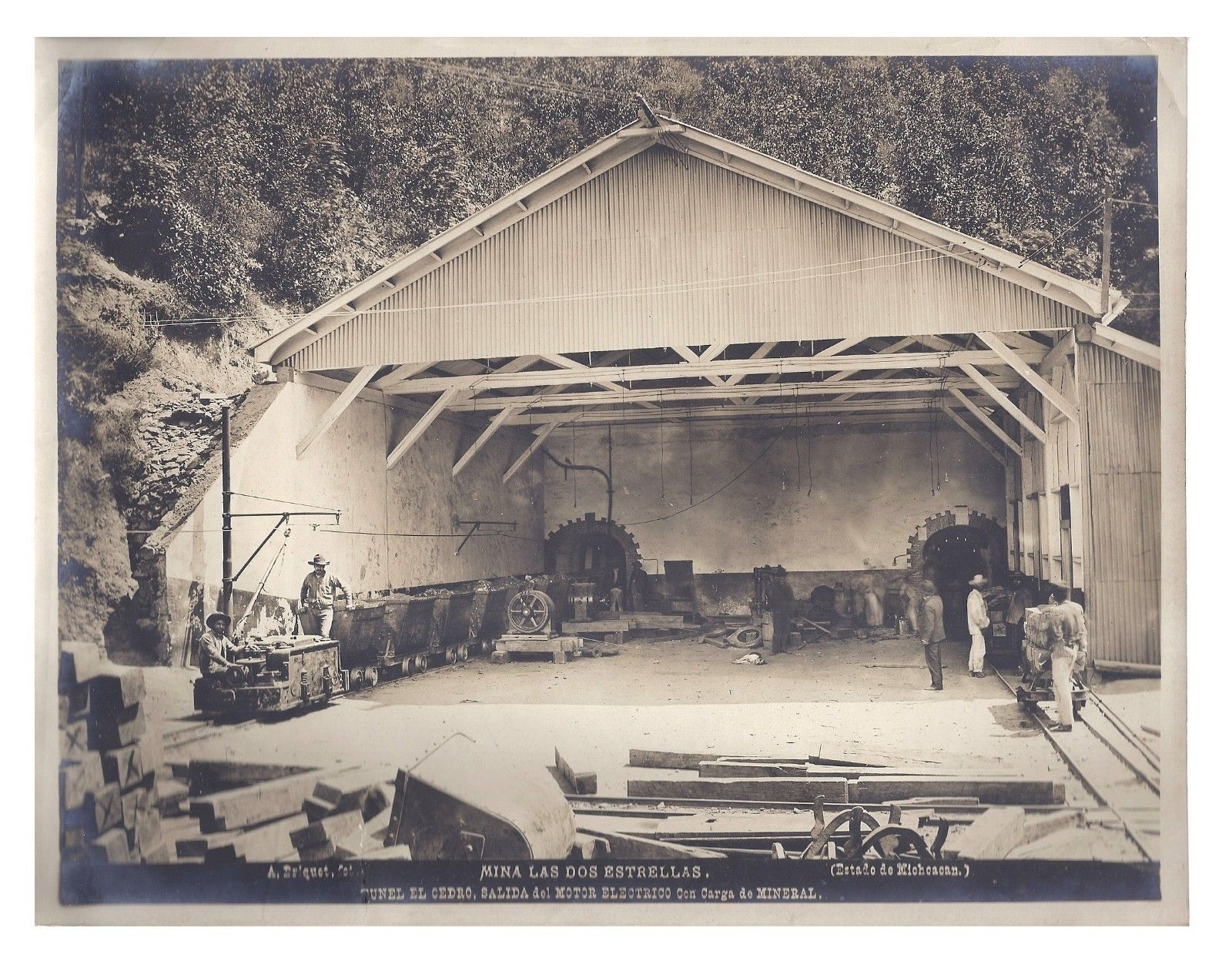
Dos estrellas mine circa 1905

In 1859, the municipality's name was changed to Mineral de Rayón, to honor the López Rayón brothers. It was later changed to the current Tlalpujahua de Rayón. In 1861, it was the seat of a district comprising Angangueo, Contepec, and itself. In 1862, Conservative forces took control of the town, which was taken back a short time later by Liberal General Rafael Cuéllar.

In 1874, the state of Michoacán attempted to restart large scale mining. However, success came at the very end of the century, when a large vein of gold ore was found on the Cerro de Somero by a worker employed by Frenchman Francois Joseph Fournier. The strike was rich and made Tlalpujahua the most important producer of gold between 1908 and 1913. This strike consolidated into the Dos Estrellas Mine. This and other older mines returned to profitability due to French and English technology, made Tlalpujahua and neighboring El Oro, a magnet for foreign workers, who came from Europe, the U.S. and even Asia. It also brought modern infrastructure such as railroad telegraph. Tlalpujahua claims to have had electric lights first in the country, even before Mexico City.

Mining came to an abrupt halt when on 27 May 1937, a major landslide buried about one-third of the town and damaged the Dos Estrellas Mine. The material was actually mining debris from deep inside the earth, so when it settled, it formed into a kind of concrete. Only the tower of the former chapel is visible today. This damaged the mine, but it was the nationalization of the mine by President Cardenas in the 1930s that led to it closing in 1959. As Dos Estrellas was the main economic engine of the area, its closing all but killed mining in Tlalpujahua, and people began migrating to other parts of Michoacan. The population dropped from 25,000 in the 1930s to only 600 in 1960.

All mining activity ended in 1959. The rise of the Christmas tree ornament industry and tourism has revived the economy somewhat. The industry began with Joaquín Muñoz Orta, who left his hometown with his family in the 1950s to Chicago, where he worked at a factory making artificial Christmas trees. He returned to Mexico in the early 1960s, but since there was still no work in Tlalpujahua, he went to Mexico City where he set up a small Christmas tree workshop with his family. They initially sold the trees in places such as the La Merced Market, but soon after they began to offer blown glass Christmas tree ornaments as well. These were more popular than the trees. Eventually, they decided to move their workshop home to Tlalpujahua, which has since become Adornos Navideños SA de CV. Today, the company has about 1,000 employees, five plants and fifteen workshops.
