= Susupuato =

Coordinates: 19°13′N 100°24′W

- Municipality
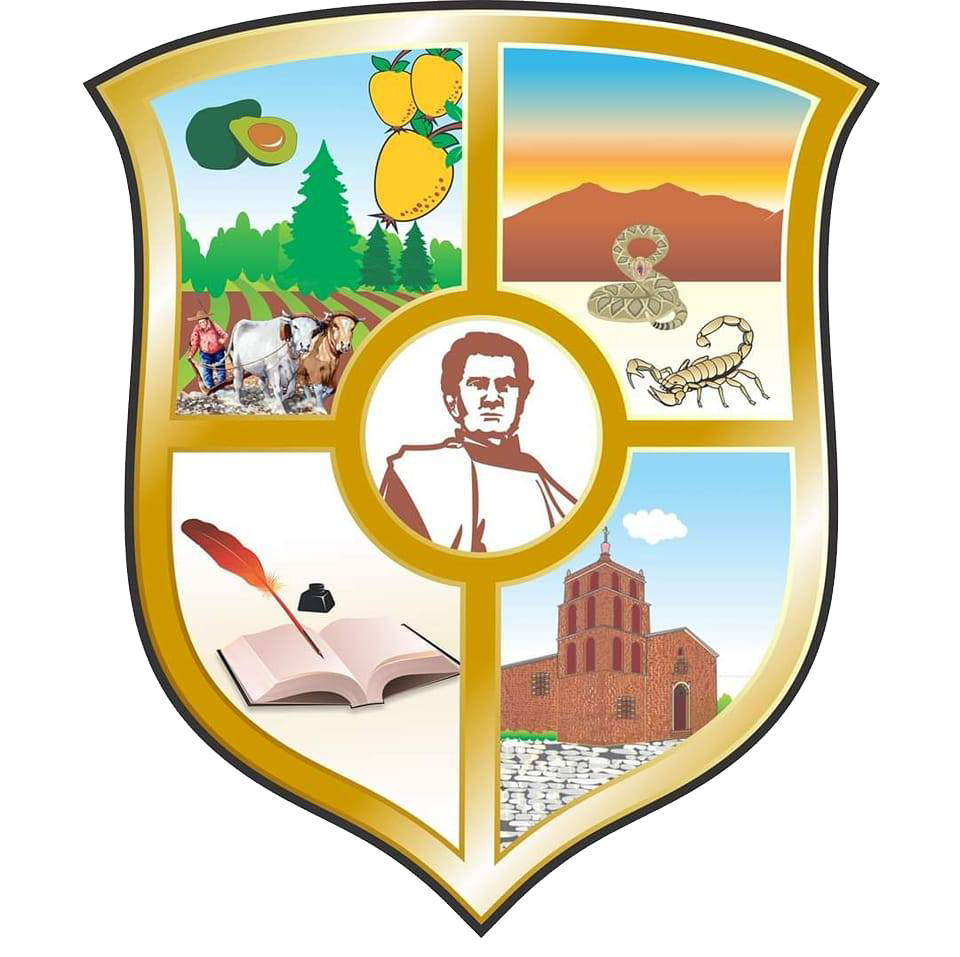
- Coat of arms

- Location in Mexico Susupuato (Mexico)
- Country: Mexico
- State: Michoacán
- Demonym: (in Spanish)
- Time zone: UTC−6 (CST)

Susupuato is a municipality in the Mexican state of Michoacán. The municipality has an area of 273.33 square kilometres (0.46% of the surface of the state) and is bordered to the north by the municipality of Juárez, to the east and south by the state of México, and to the west by Tuzantla. The municipality had a population of 7,703 inhabitants according to the 2005 census. Its municipal seat is the city of Susupuato de Guerrero.

In pre-Columbian days the region was home to Purépecha, Mazahua, Otomi and Nahua people.
