= Tuzantla =

Municipality in Michoacán, Mexico

Coordinates: 19°12′N 100°34′W

- Municipality
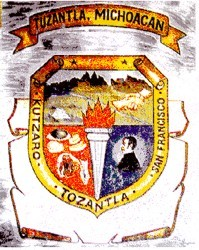
- Coat of arms

- Location in Mexico Tuzantla (Mexico)
- Country: Mexico
- State: Michoacán
- Demonym: (in Spanish)
- Time zone: UTC−6 (CST)

Tuzantla is a municipality in the eastern part of the Mexican state of Michoacán. The municipality has an area of 1,018.49 square kilometres (1.73% of the surface of the state) and is bordered to the north by the municipalities of Jungapeo and Hidalgo, to the east by Juárez and Susupuato, to the south by Tiquicheo and the state of Guerrero, and to the west by Tiquicheo and Tzitzio. The municipality had a population of 15,302 inhabitants according to the 2005 census. Its municipal seat is the city of the same name.

In Pre-Columbian times, the area was inhabited by Nahuas, but was conquered by the Purépecha Empire. Its name, Tuzantla, is a word of Nahuatl origin that means "Place where gophers are abundant". Its Purépecha name was either Cusaro or Ocumo (also spelled Hocumu or Ucumu), the latter meaning "Otomi".
