= Tuxpan, Michoacán =

Coordinates: 19°33′58″N 100°27′45″W

Tuxpan
- Municipality
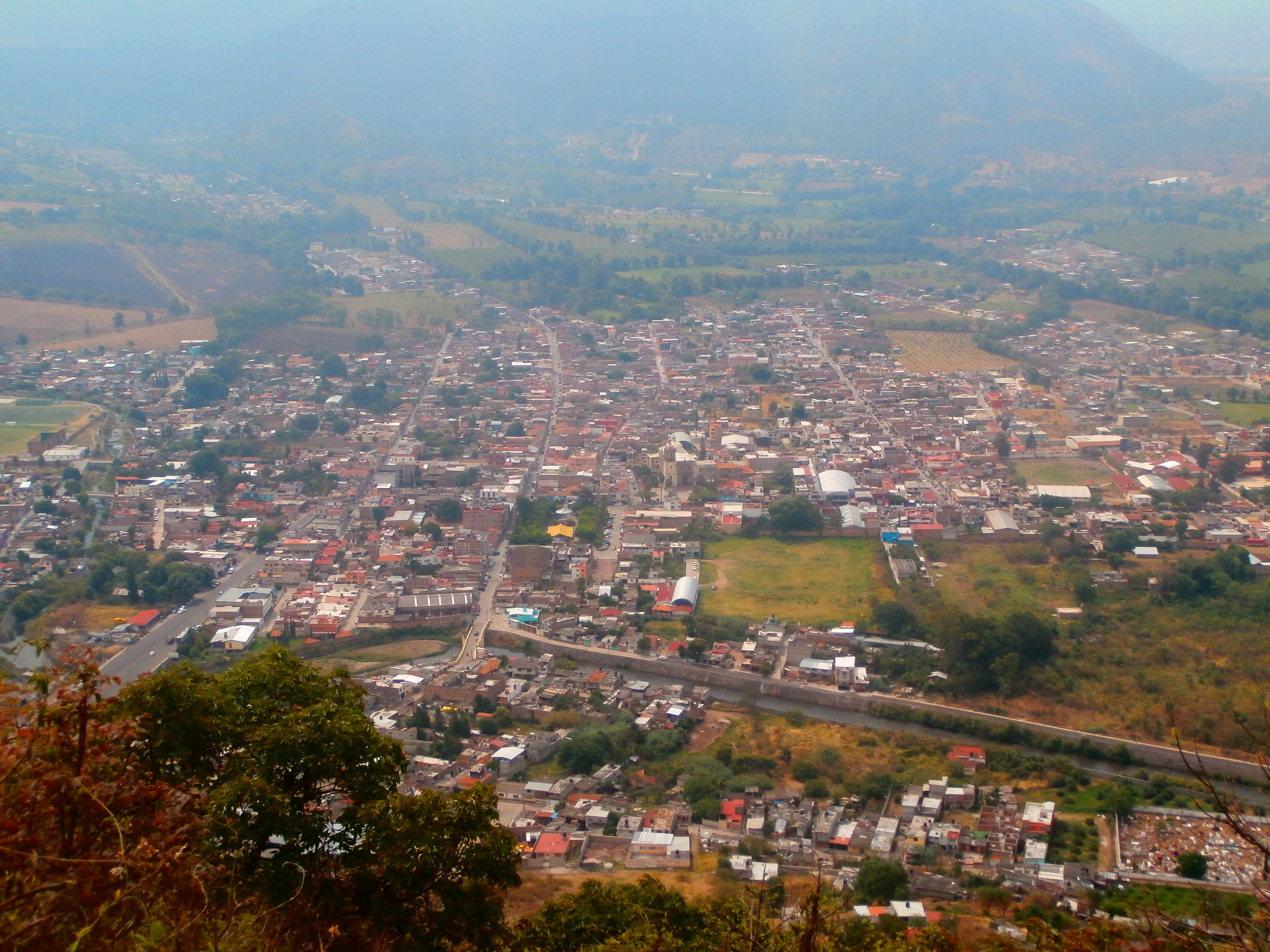

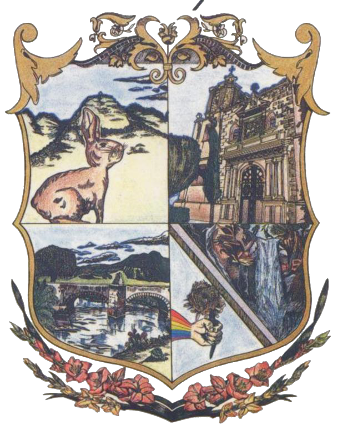
- Coat of arms

- Location in Mexico Tuxpan (Mexico)
- Country: Mexico
- State: Michoacán
- Demonym: (in Spanish)
- Time zone: UTC−6 (CST)

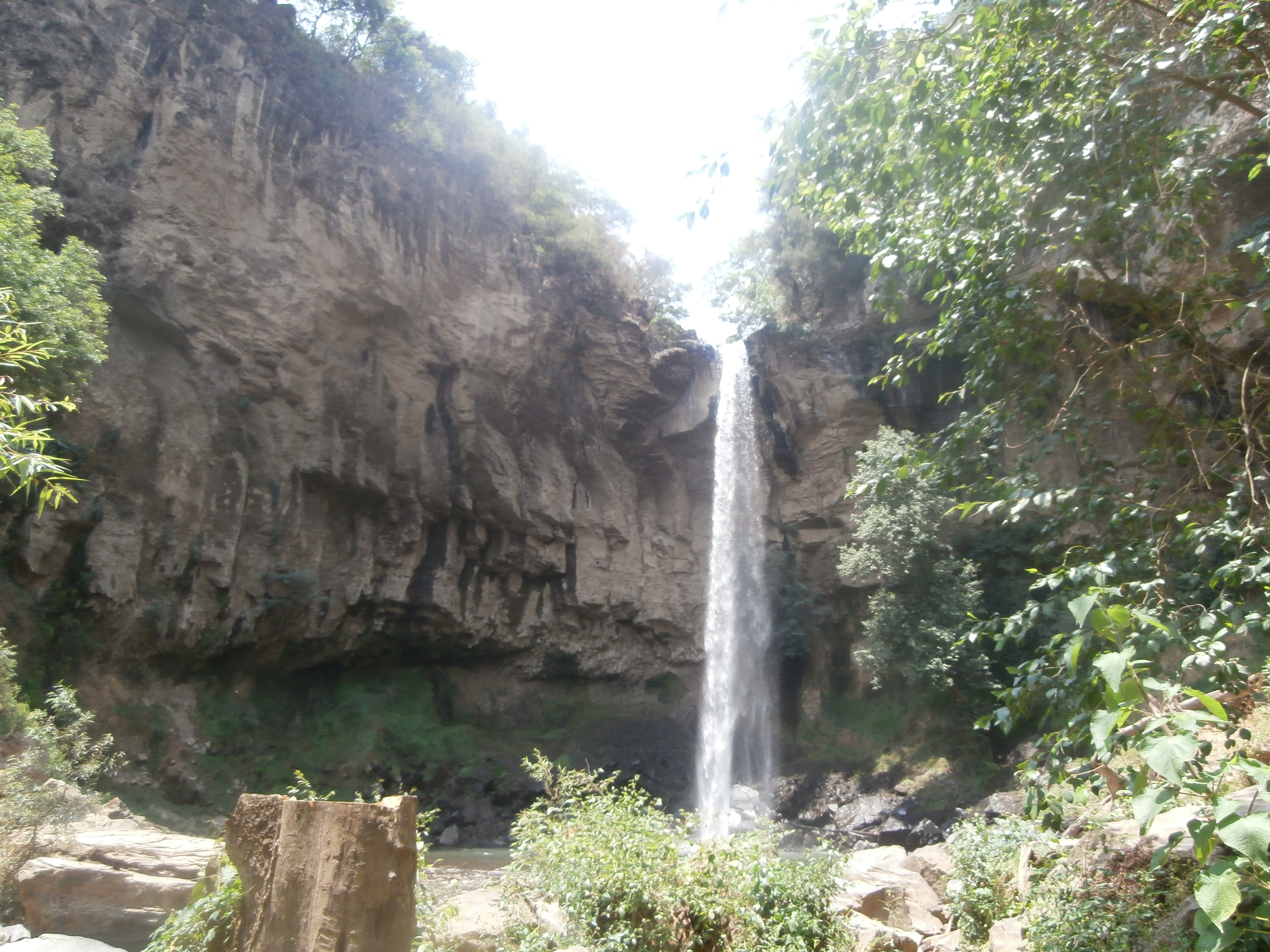
Waterfall El Moro in Tuxpan municipality

Tuxpan is a town in between Zitácuaro and Ciudad Hidalgo in the Mexican state of Michoacán. It is located 118 km (73 mi) from Morelia. As of the 2020 census, the town had a population of 8,962.

== Etymology ==
The town was born with the name of "Tuspa," which was given by the Otomi people some centuries before the birth of Jesus Christ. It was changed by the Aztecs in 1225 to Tochpan; in Nahua, tochtli means "rabbit" and an means "place". The name can be interpreted as "place of rabbits".

Catholic settlers registered Tuxpan as Santiago Tuxpan, in honor of one of the 12 apostles of Christ. This name continued until the birth of the first Republic of Mexico, when it was changed to "Tuxpan".

== History ==
The first occupiers of the land of Tuxpan was the indigenous group of the Otomi. The only evidence found of when the Otomi people lived in Tuxpan are some archaeological artifacts that can be traced back to some centuries BC.

In 1200 AD the Otomi of Tuxpan formed part of a 340 town strong Purépecha Empire. The Aztecs were never able to conquer this land due to the great power of the Purépecha Alliance. This relationship gave Tuxpan over 250 years of peace.

In 1464, the Aztec king Axayacatl started to invade the Purépecha territories. As part of the Purépecha Alliance, the 300 men strong Tuxpan fought against the thousands of Aztec soldiers. Defeat was inevitable, and the town was destroyed and burned down. The battle was considered an incredible act of heroism by the Aztecs and Purépecha people. In 1466, the Purépecha Empire swore to protect Tuxpan from any other battle to come.

The target in Michoacán was to move most of the native Indians to newly built or reconstructed towns. Catholic missionaries prepared the land so it could officially be made into a town. On October 4, 1598, a special ceremony was held for the birth of the town of Tuxpan, Michoacán. All sorts of people attended the ceremony, including the Indian chief of the land, government officials, men who had already purchased a large area of land, and the many Indians who already lived on the land.

== Culture ==
Every year Tuxpan celebrates its most important date on the Saturday before Easter. During the next two weeks the town is in a state of celebration. A carnival is set up where people can enjoy all sorts of games. This is very similar to the carnival ambient in the United States. Aside from the typical Mexican dishes (quesadillas, tacos, and tamales), the culinary specialty this time of the year is a pasta which is in fact a type of vanilla ice cream. Conserva is also a popular choice; this is a variety of fruits boiled with sugar until it is honey-like.

The first Saturday of every March is dedicated to the sport of horse racing. It is held in small racetrack on the westside of town. The races star in the afternoon and continue until early evening. During the event, downtown Tuxpan is completely deserted.

A beauty pageant is organized by the town every year to select a girl worthy of representing Tuxpan during the festivities. The participants are generally 15- to 19-year-old girls. The process of choosing a winner is similar to any other pageant. The queen is also the main attraction at the parade.

On the first Tuesday after the Sábado de Carreras, the town has a unique parade in which all sorts of people participate. The queen of the beauty pageant along with the runner-up and the third-place winner make up an important part of the parade. The schools also play an important part in the event, from pre-k to high school. The last section is dedicated to the "charros"; men and women dress up as such and ride horses in the parade.

== Tourism ==
The main natural attraction in Tuxpan is El Salto or "the jump". It is a cascade about 2.5 miles northeast of the downtown area. Visitors usually prepare a barbecue and spend the day swimming and playing games.

Tuxpan is also known for its church dedicated to James, son of Zebedee, St. James the Apostle (Santiago Apostol), in which a painting by Cristóbal de Villalpando is exhibited.

== El Cerro de la Cruz, "The Mountain with the Cross" ==
This mountain can be seen from almost anywhere in Tuxpan. In 2004 the municipal government built stairs all the way to the top of the mountain.
