= Aporo, Michoacán =

Aporo
- Municipality
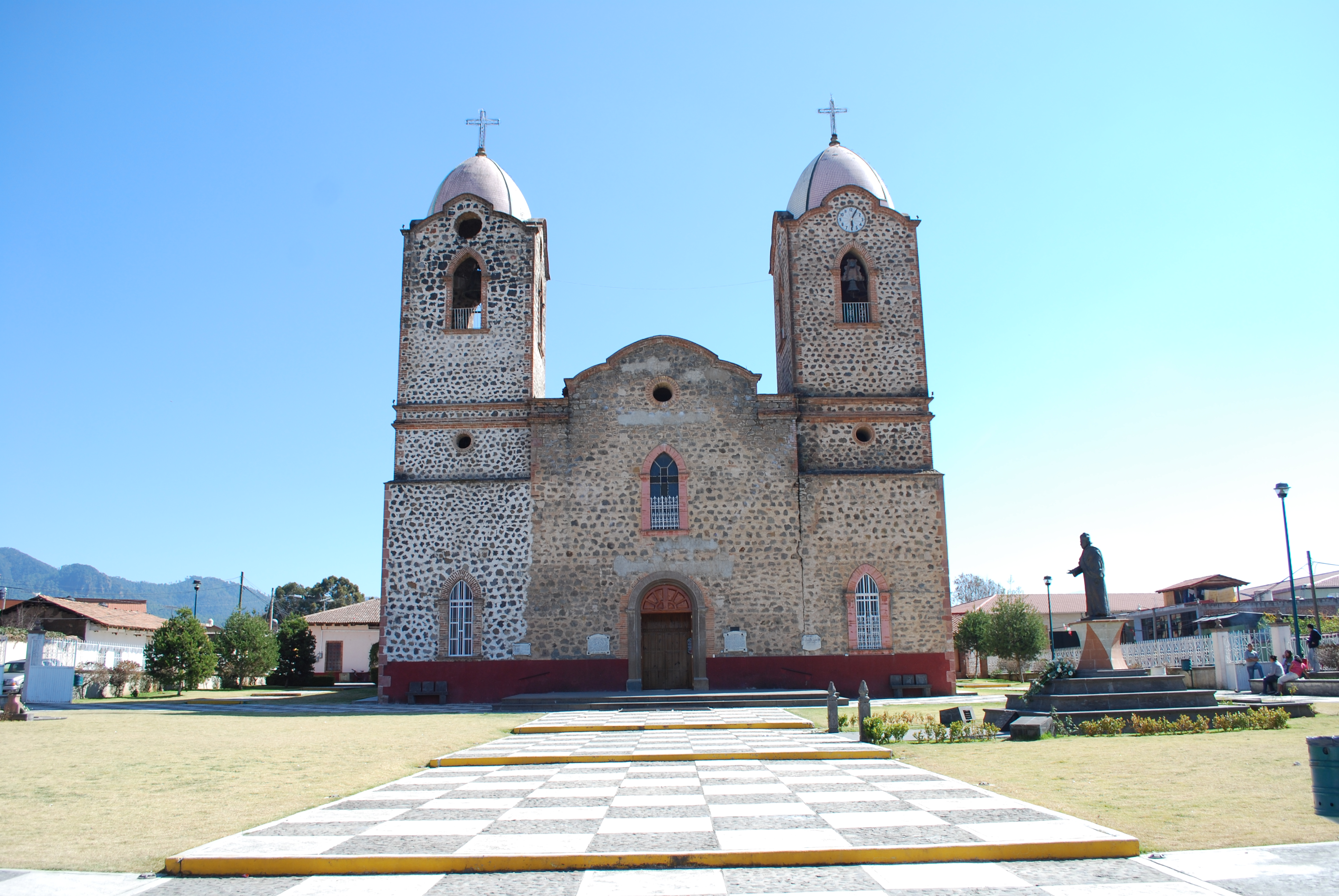
- San Lucas Evangelista Church

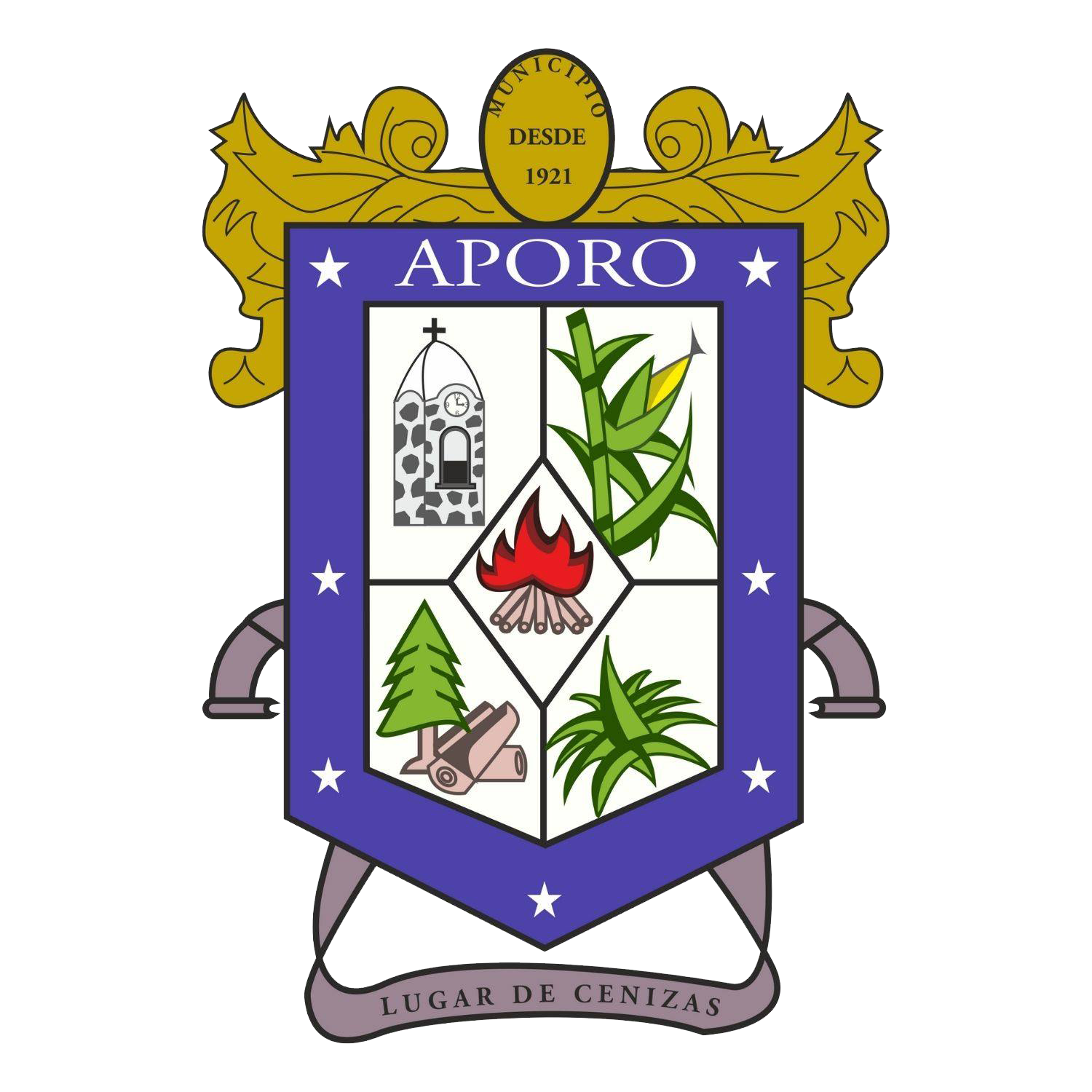
- Coat of arms

- Location within Michoacán Location within Mexico
- Coordinates: 19°40′11″N 100°24′35″W
- Country: Mexico
- State: Michoacán
- Municipality: Aporo
- Municipal Seat: Aporo
- Town Founded: 1540
- Municipality Founded: 1921

Government
  - Municipal President: C. Juan Agustín Torres Sandoval

Area
  - Municipality: 55.14 km^{2} (21.29 sq mi)
- Elevation (of seat): 2,280 m (7,480 ft)

Population (2005) Municipality
  - Municipality: 2,705
  - Seat: 1,859
- Time zone: UTC-6 (Zona Centro)
- Postal code (of seat): 61400
- Website: (in Spanish) aporo.gob.mx

Aporo is a municipality in the Mexican state of Michoacán, being the smallest municipality in Michoacán by area. The municipal seat is the town of Aporo. Most of the municipality is forested and considered to be part of Monarch Butterfly Biosphere Reserve, where millions of monarch butterflies arrive to stay five months each winter. The town and municipality have mostly adobe structures with tile roofs and the main architectural site is the San Lucas Evangelista Church, which was built in the 20th century.

== The town ==
The town of Aporo is a small rural community of less than 3,000 people, accounting for about seventy percent of the municipal population. (inegi) It is located in the mountains at an altitude of 2,280 meters above sea level at the eastern edge of the state. The center of the town is the parish church of San Lucas Evangelista, which honors Saint Luke. This church is the most important architectural structure in both the town and municipality. The building of the church was the work of Eleuterio Raya Zavala, who was the parish priest of the area for thirty six years in the early and mid-20th century. He also had the Chapel of San Francisco built as well. This church hosts the annual feast day of the patron saint, Luke, with music, dance, amusement rides, fireworks mounted on structures called "castillos" (castles) and "toritos" (little bulls) which brings visitors from surrounding communities. During this and other festival typical dishes of the area include corundas, mole, barbacoa and "guenches" which is a larva found on strawberry trees.

== The municipality ==
Aporo is by far the largest community in the municipality, with about sixty nine percent of the total population of 2,705 (2005). Other communities include Rincón de Soto (263), Arroyo Seco (145), Ojo de Agua (89) and Juan Perez (126). The town is the local government of an area of over 55km2. The municipality is bordered by the municipalities of Senguio, Angangueo, Ocampo, Tuxpan and Irimbo.

Its geography includes the Sierra de Anguangeo and other peaks such as Don Felix, Chino, Colorado, Prieto and Seco. The entire area is part of the Trans-Mexican Volcanic Belt. The two principal rivers are the Zarco and the El Grande, supplemented by a number of fresh water springs such as the San Luis and the Ojo de Agua de Martinillos. It has a cold climate with rains in the summer, with average temperatures ranging from 7.8C to 23.4C. Ecosystems are primarily forests of conifers such as oyamel, pine and juniper with some cedar. Wildlife includes cacomixtle, rabbits, weasels, coyotes and various birds.

The major economic activity of the municipally is forestry, especially the cutting of pines for wood, along with the processing of these trees/furniture making, accounting for 45% of the local economy. One other craft is the making of wooden staffs and canes which are sold in various parts of the country. In second place is the cultivation of beans, corn and wheat. In third is the raising of cattle, horses, pigs, sheep and domestic fowl. Commerce is limited to local needs.

Most of the municipality is considered to be part of Monarch Butterfly Biosphere Reserve, where millions of monarch butterflies arrive to stay five months each winter. It participates in the annual Festival Cultural de la Mariposa Monarca each year. The municipality also has sites such as La Peña Redonda, which has archeological remains and a dam area called La Presa del Ejido. However, tourism is not part of the municipality’s economy.

The municipality only has education from pre school to middle school within its borders. Middle school classes are given through distance education. Schools in the municipality include Escuela Telesecundario Estv16 723 (middle school), General Franicisco Villa (primary), Heroinas de la Independencia (middle school), Ignacio Lopez Rayon (primary), Ignacio Zaragoza (primary), Jardin de Niños (preschool), Jose Maria Morelos y Pavon (primary), Modulo I (kindergarten), Robert Owen (preschool) and Valentin Gomez Farias (primary). All are public institutions. The municipality has a growth rate of one percent. Its population has grown from 2,613 inhabitants in 1995 to 2,705 in 2005. Most residents are Catholic with some belonging to Evangelical churches. In 2005, INEGI counted only seven people in the municipality as speaking an indigenous language, all men. The languages were Otomi and Tzetal.

The area is very rural with 558 housing units (2005), mostly adobe houses with tile roofs, with some of cinderblock. Basic services such as potable water, electricity and garbage collection is available to between 70 and 90 percent of residents. It contains one sports facility with a soccer field, baseball field and two basketball courts.

The municipality is located near the major highway between Toluca and Morelia. It is also connected to Ciudad Hidalgo and Maravatío on State Highway 122. Another road links it with Angangueo. It is served by second class inter-city busses.

== History ==
The name comes from the Chichimeca word hapu or hapur which means place of ashes. The municipality has its own coat of arms, divided into five parts, one of which is in the center. These panels include images of Saint Luke, the patron saint, corn, mining and maguey. The last three refer to the area’s basic economic staples from the pre Hispanic period to the present. At the bottom the words “Lugar de Cenizas” which is the translation of the Chichimeca name in Spanish.

The municipal seat traces its origins to the pre Hispanic period. It was originally inhabited by the Otomi, but it was then conquered by the Purépecha Empire. Soon after the Spanish conquest of the Aztec Empire, the Spanish soon took over Purépecha lands. Aporo then became part of an encomienda headed by González de Salazar called Taximaroa.

The Spanish settlement was officially founded in 1540 by decree of the Spanish king with the name of San Lucas Aporo. This recognition was for the help of the local Otomi in the Conquest. The Spanish founders are named as two friars, Francisco Motolina and Lino Montes y Zuiza. Evangelization efforts in the area were headed by Martín de la Coruña.

The first train passed through the municipality in 1890. It was struck by a smallpox epidemic in 1911. After Independence, Aporo was part of the municipality of Irimbo. However, administrative and religious conflicts eventually caused the creation of a new municipality in 1921 encompassing the Chupio Valley. The first municipal president was C. Celestino Velazquez. Three years later, the seat lost its status and the area became part of the Senguio municipality. Its final status as an independent municipality was set by state decree in 1927, with its current boundaries. Since then, Aporo has had over sixty municipal presidents.
