= Maravatío =

- Municipality
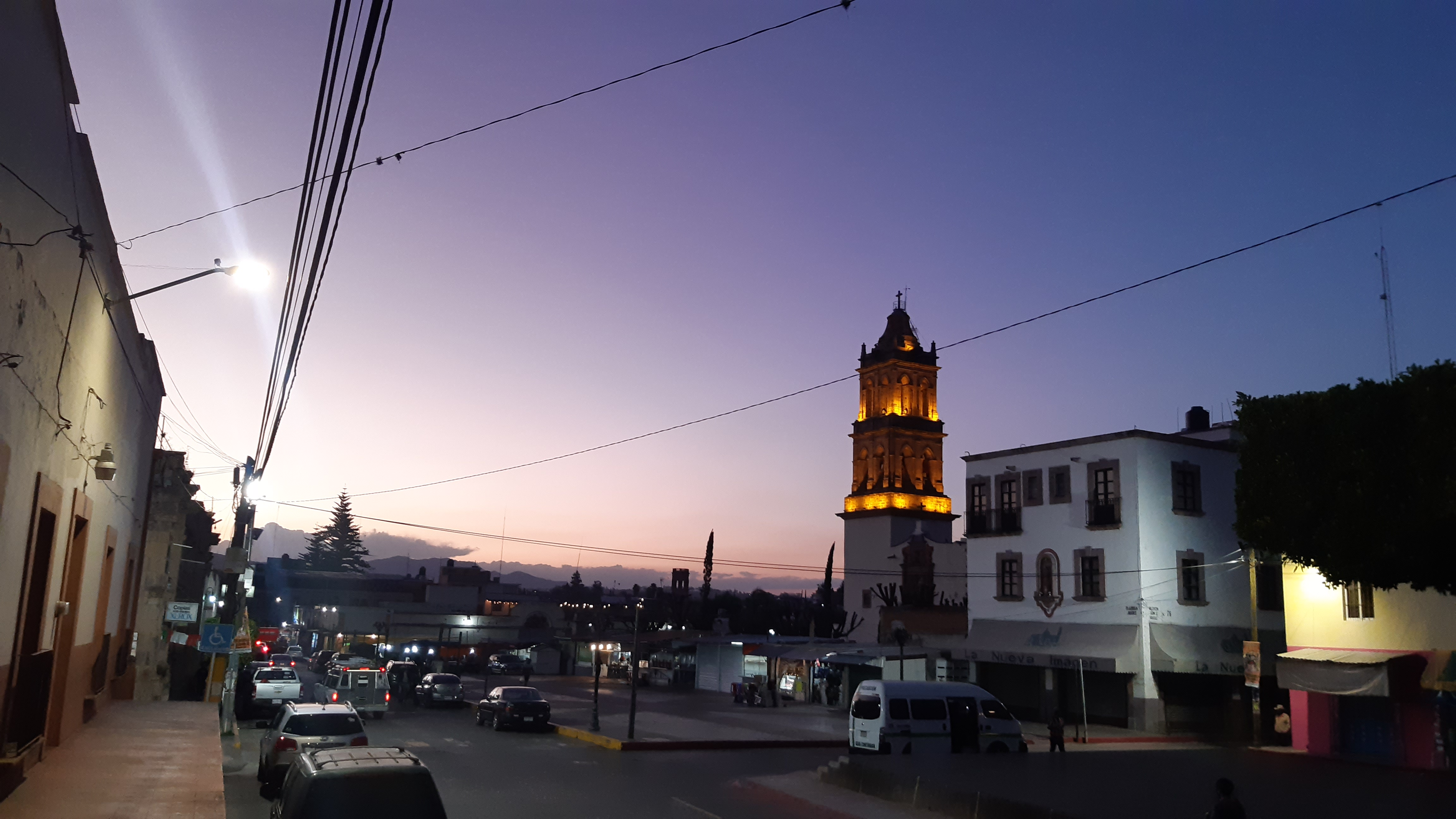

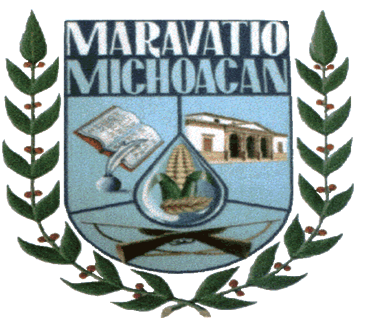
- Coat of arms

- Location within Michoacán Location within Mexico
- Coordinates: 19°53′51.33″N 100°26′59.99″W
- Country: Mexico
- State: Michoacán
- Municipal seat: Maravatío de Ocampo

Government
  - Municipal president: Jaime Hinojosa Campa

Area
  - Total: 691.55 km^{2} (267.01 sq mi)
- Elevation: 2,036 m (6,680 ft)

Population (2010)
  - Total: 80,258
  - Density: 116.06/km^{2} (300.58/sq mi)
- Time zone: UTC-6 (Zona Centro)
- Website: http://ayuntamientomaravatio.gob.mx/

Maravatío is a municipality in the Mexican state of Michoacán, representing 1.17% of its land area, or 691.55 km^{2}.

== Etymology ==
The modern word Maravatío comes from the Purépecha word Marhabatio, meaning a precious place or thing.

== History ==
Maravatio has a complicated history spanning hundreds of years. Though officially founded in 1540, the area had previously experienced settlement by Otomi, Mazahua, and Purepecha peoples. After Spanish contact, it functioned as a bulwark against various Chichimeca tribes of the north, primarily the Pame and Guamare, and eventually was classified as an "Indian Republic" governed by Don Pedro Juárez.

== Geography ==
Neighboring locations include Guanajuato to the north; Contepec and Tlalpujahua to the east; Senguio, Irimbo, and Ciudad Hidalgo to the south; and Zinapécuaro to the west.

== Economy ==
The economy of Maravatío is primarily agricultural in nature, focusing on the production of strawberries, corn, beans, potatoes, wheat, and tomatoes. The municipality also has a herd of cattle with some economic importance, industries focused on the fabrication of ornamental ironwork, as well as business sectors.

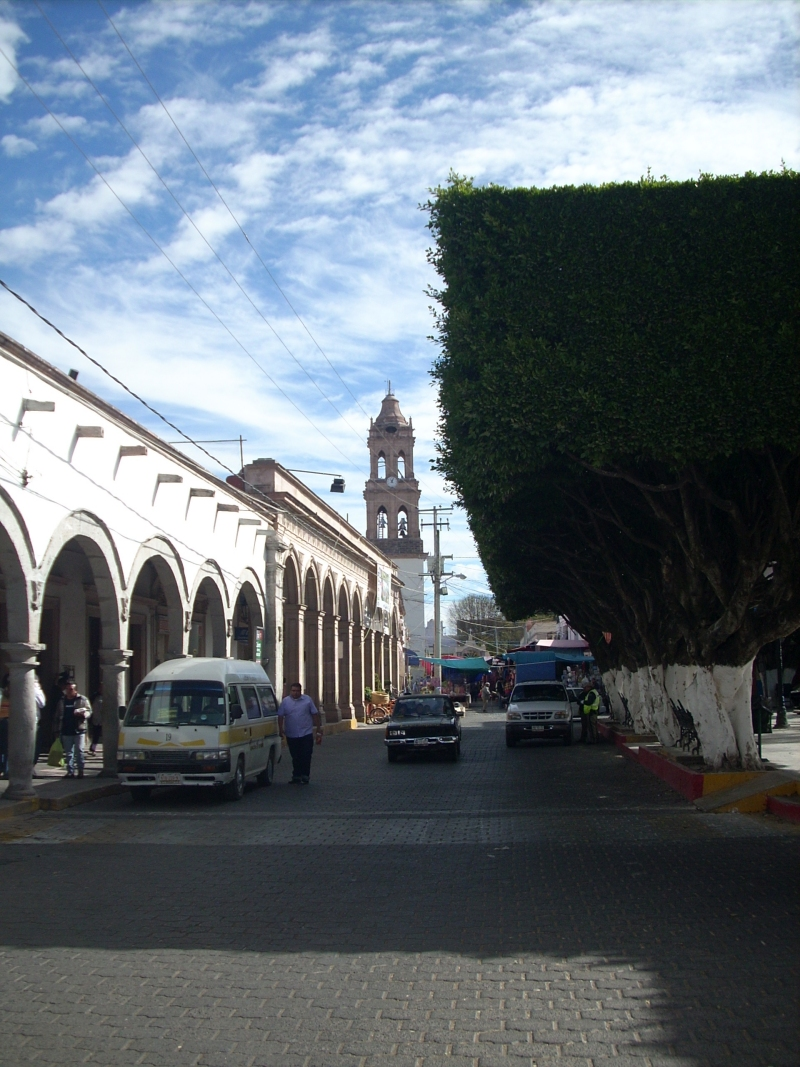
Maravatío city center, with the tower of the parish church in the distance.

== Tourist attractions ==
Some of the principal places of interest to tourists in the municipality are the following:

- The Parish Church of San Juan Bautista
- Hacienda de Pomoca (the place where Melchor Ocampo lived)
- El Teatro Morelos (the Morelos Theater)
- El Mirador (the viewpoint)

The city contains the parochial temple of San Juan Bautista, built in the baroque style in the 16th century, as well as the chapel of the Immaculate Conception, in the mudéjar style; the chapel of the Lord of the Column; the Chapel of Saint Michael Archangel, in San Miguel Curahuango; the temple of Saint Mary, in Ziritzícuaro; and the temple of Uripitío.

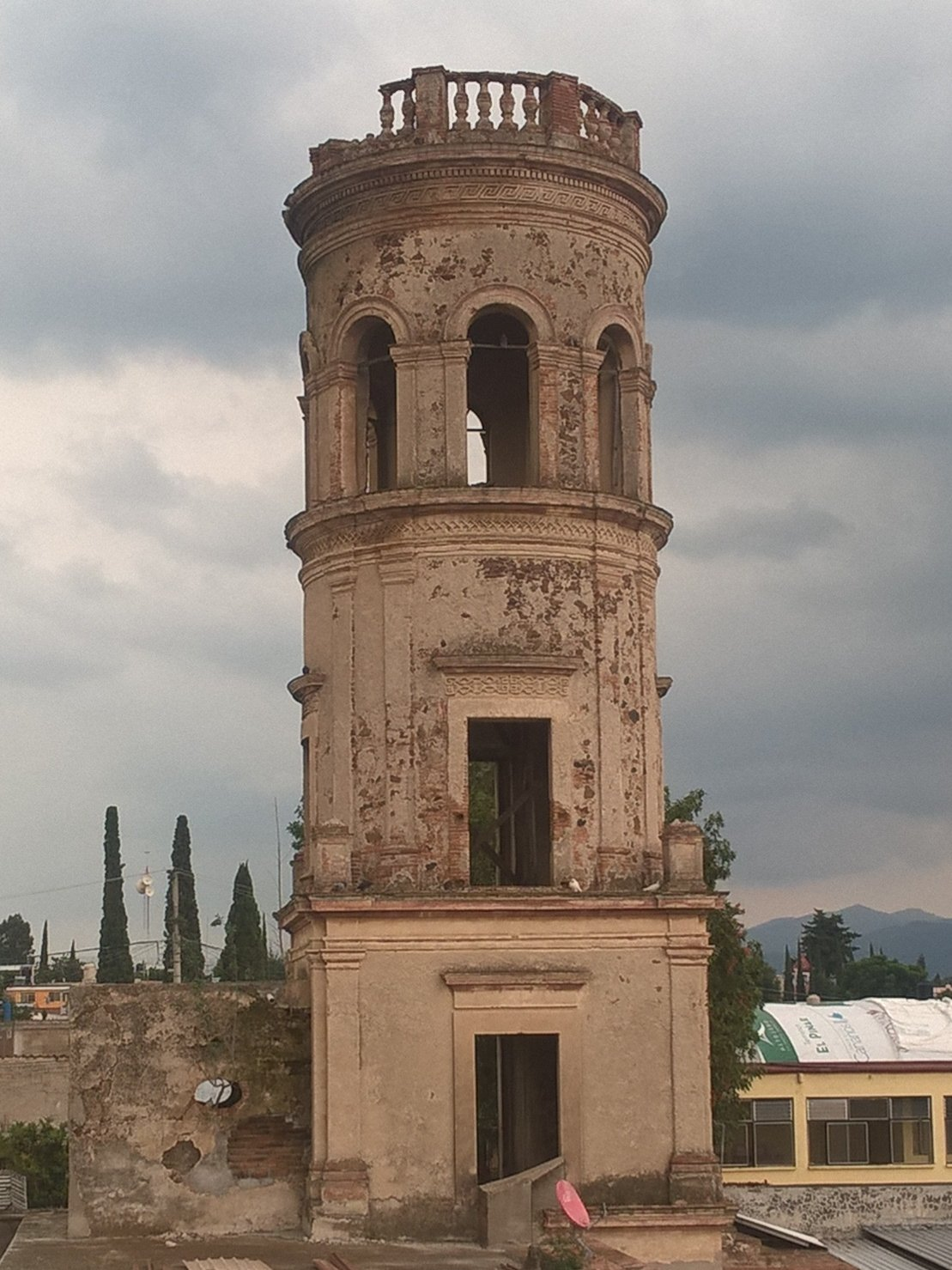
The colonial Mirador in the town centre.

Also of interest are the former haciendas of Apeo that were the property of Don Mateo Echaíz de Santa Elena in 1857; the house where Don Miguel Hidalgo stayed, near Independence Gate; the railway station, at which trains first arrived in 1883; and the Morelos Theater, constructed in the Porfirio Díaz era, which was inaugurated with a performance by the soprano Ángela Peralta.

Maravatío is a good base for visiting monarch butterfly sanctuaries between October and March, and there are many hot springs near the city suitable for bathing.

Along with tourists attractions, there are many places to enjoy a delicious meal, fruit, or desserts at a very low price.

== Transport ==
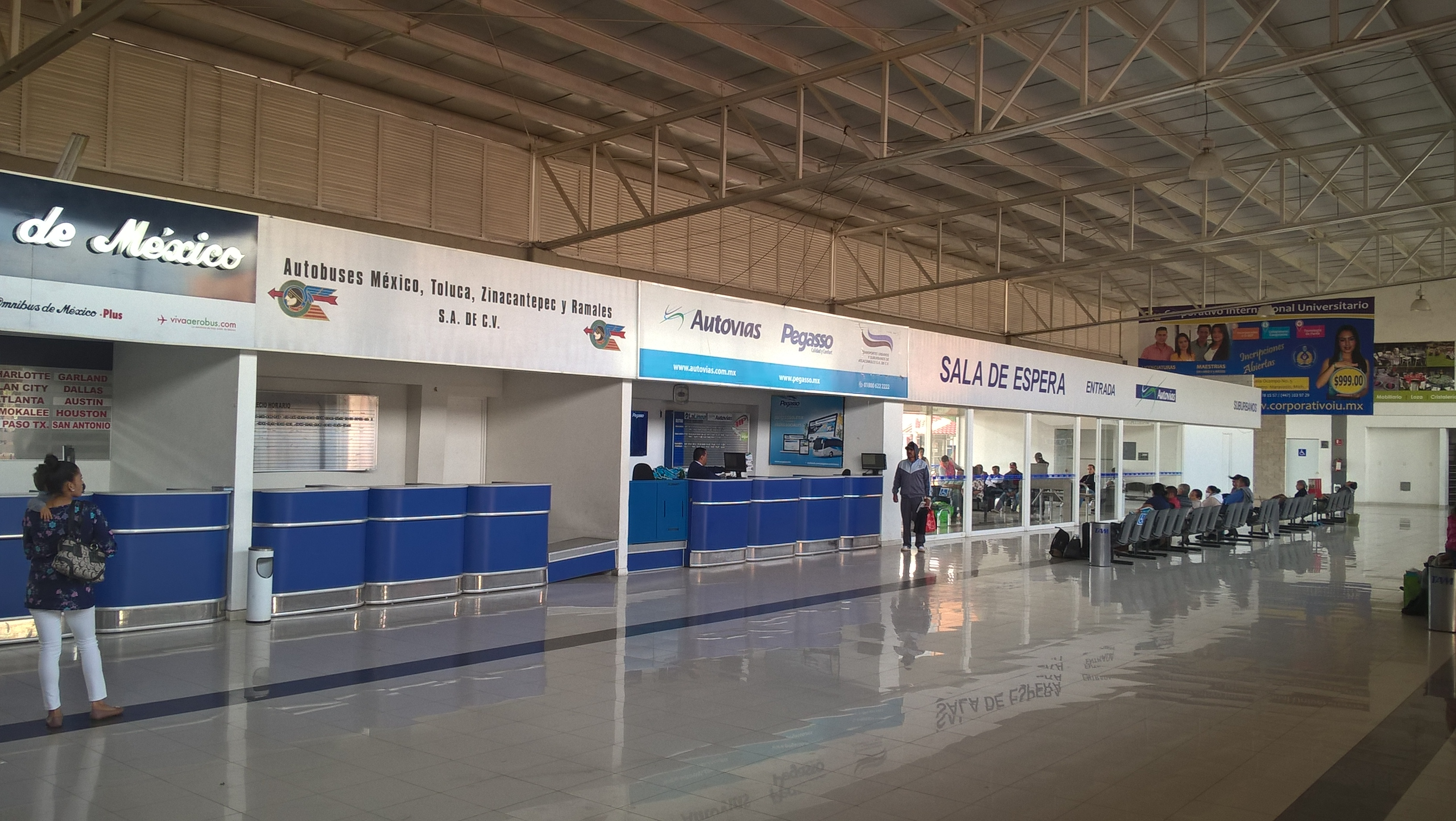
Maravatio coach station

Coaches run by several different companies run to and from Maravatio, connecting nearby towns like Atlacomulco and Ciudad Hidalgo, cities further afield such as Mexico City, Morelia and Querétaro, and international destinations like Atlanta, El Paso and Immokalee.

The nearest airport is Morelia International Airport.

== Politics ==
Executive power in the municipality is vested in the presidente municipal or municipal president. The following table lists Maravatío's past executives:

Term	Municipal President	Political party
1972	Guillermo Calderón Díaz	Institutional Revolutionary Party
1972-1974	Salvador Olvera Quintero	Institutional Revolutionary Party
1975-1977	Moisés Aguilar Monroy	Institutional Revolutionary Party
1978-1980	José Coronel Zamudio	Institutional Revolutionary Party
1981-1982	Florencio Alcantar Mejía	Institutional Revolutionary Party
1983	Cuauhtémoc Núñez	Institutional Revolutionary Party
1984-1986	Antonio Cruz Melo	Institutional Revolutionary Party
1987-1989	Carlos Torroella	Institutional Revolutionary Party
1990-1992	Cresenciano Hernández	Party of the Democratic Revolution
1993-1995	Raúl Fierros Fierros	Institutional Revolutionary Party
1996-1998	Mario Cruz Andrade	Party of the Democratic Revolution
1999-2001	José Jaime Hinojosa Campa	Party of the Democratic Revolution
2002-2004	Ignacio Montoya Marin	Party of the Democratic Revolution
2005-2007	José Jaime Hinojosa Campa	Party of the Democratic Revolution
2008-2011	Roberto Flores Bautista	
2012–2014	Guillermo Corona López	
2015–2017	Jose Luis Abad Bautista	
2018–present	Jaime Hinojosa Campa	
