= Zitácuaro =

City in Michoacán, Mexico

- City
- Heroica Zitácuaro
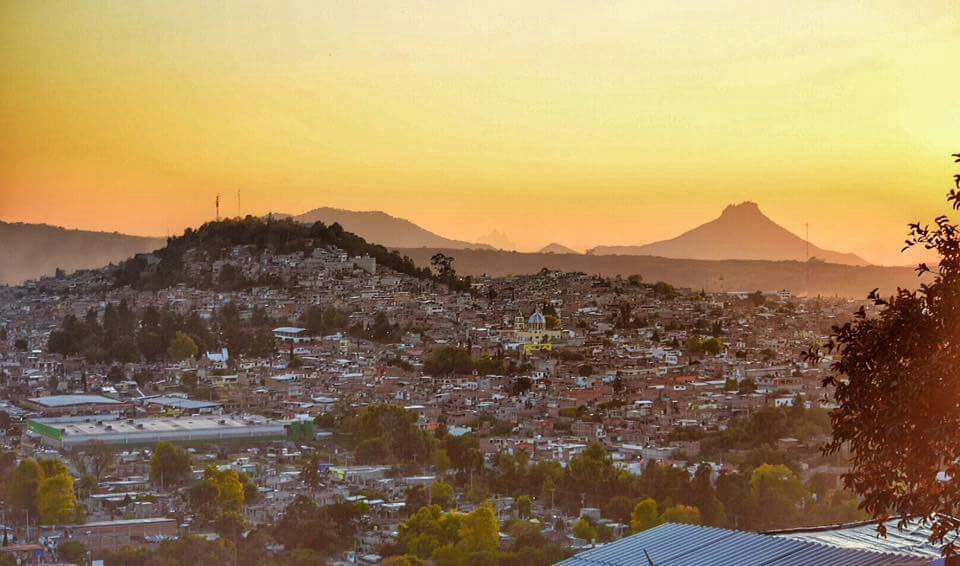
- Panoramic view of eastern Zitácuaro

- Location in Michoacán Zitácuaro (Mexico)
- Coordinates: 19°24′N 100°22′W
- Country: Mexico
- State: Michoacán
- Founded: 1765

Area
  - Total: 498 km^{2} (192 sq mi)
- Elevation: 1,942 m (6,371 ft)

Population (2020)
  - Total: 86,901
- Time zone: UTC−6 (Central Time)
- Website: www.zitacuaro.gob.mx

Zitácuaro, officially known as Heroica Zitácuaro, is a city in the Mexican state of Michoacán. The city is the administrative centre for the surrounding municipality of the same name, which lies at the extreme eastern side of Michoacán and borders on the adjacent state of México. The city reported a population of 185,534 in the 2010 census. The municipality has an area of 498 km^{2} (192.3 sq mi). The name Zitácuaro comes from Mazahua Tsitákuarhu.

== Geography ==
Zitácuaro stands at 19°26′N 100°22′W, in the northeast corner of Michoacán, some 150 km east of state capital Morelia, at an elevation of 1,942 metres above sea level. The municipality covers a total of 498 km^{2} and is drained by the Río Zitácuaro, the Río San Andrés, and the Río San Juan Viejo. The surrounding terrain are avocado orchards and the pine-covered mountains of the Sierra Madre Occidental; to the north of Zitácuaro are the famed Mexican wintering grounds of the monarch butterfly.

In 1995 the municipality reported a total population of 145,500 inhabitants, accounting for 3.1% of the state's total population. Of these, some 3,740 people spoke an indigenous language (primarily Otomi, Mazahua, and Nahuatl).

Zitácuaro is an important intermediate point on Federal Highway 15, which runs from Mexico City to Morelia (following the route of the colonial royal road). Another road branches off in the city en route for Huetamo, Ciudad Altamirano, and the Pacific Ocean coast. A railways leads northwards to Maravatío (nowadays used only for freight).

Other towns and villages in the municipality are: Aputzio de Juárez, Crescencio Morales, Curungueo, San Felipe de los Alzati, and Zirahuato.

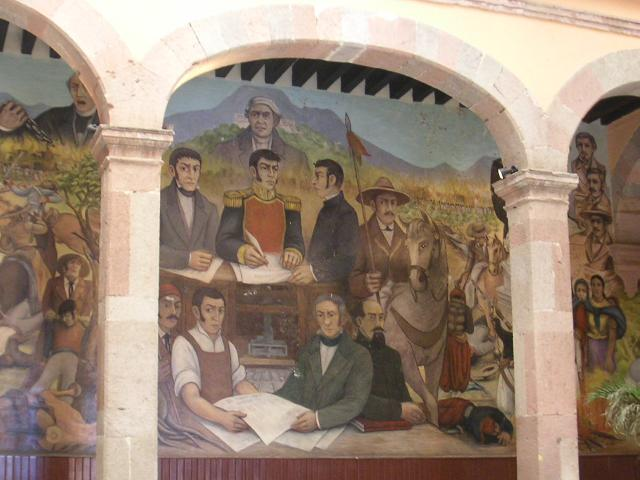
Mural inside the Palacio municipal (City Hall)

== History ==
An indigenous settlement was founded on the site of modern-day Zitácuaro, possibly as early as the 12th century, by Otomis and Mazahuas (an Otomi ceremonial centre still stands in San Felipe de los Alzati, 9 km to the north of the municipal seat). In the mid-14th century, Mazahuas led by Yquingari conquered the region.

At the time of the Spanish conquest, the area stood on the border between the lands of the Purépecha League and those of the Aztec Empire. The locals are reported to have fought alongside the Aztecs, with whom they were allied, in the failed defence of Tenochtitlan. Following this defeat, Franciscan friars established a parish church with the name of San Juan Tzitácuaro, and a monastery was founded in the early 18th century.

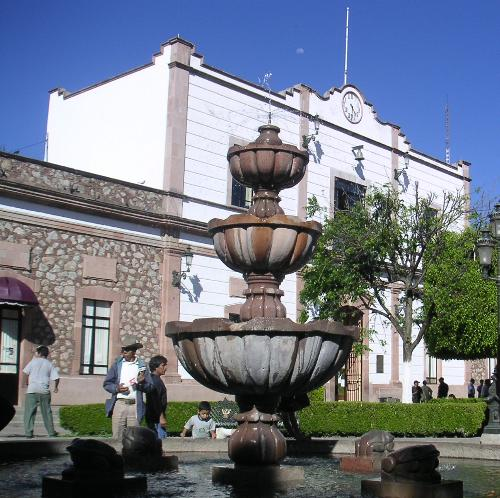
Fountain on the zócalo and municipal palace

Following Mexico's Declaration of Independence in September 1810, the area around Zitácuaro joined the insurgent cause under the leadership of Benedicto López, a local criollo farmer. In response to López's cutting off of the royal road between Mexico City and Valladolid, the viceroy sent a regiment of loyalist troops to put down the rebellion. This regiment was repulsed on 20 February 1811 and defeated on 22 May, and its captain, Juan Bautista de la Torre, was taken prisoner and killed by indigenous militia-men. Later that summer, Benedicto López surrendered control of the city to Ignacio López Rayón, who set up in Zitácuaro on 21 August 1811 the Suprema Junta Nacional Americana (the "Supreme American National Council"), recognised as the first attempt by the insurgents to establish an independent government. This outraged the royalist forces in Mexico City, which attacked the city and, on 12 January 1812, regained control, sacked it, and summarily razed it to the ground.

The 1812 incident was the first burning of Zitácuaro. The second took place on 1 April 1855, at the hands of troops loyal to Gen. Antonio López de Santa Anna during the Revolution of Ayutla, in response to the city's expressed support for Gen. Juan Álvarez. The city was burnt to the ground on a third occasion on 15 April 1865 by French Imperial troops in reprisal for the Republicans' victory at Tacámbaro some days earlier.

In recognition of the turbulent events of the previous half-century and the city's heroism, on 20 April 1868 President Benito Juárez issued a decree whereby San Juan Zitácuaro would henceforth be known by the name of "Heroica Zitácuaro".

Four people died during a shootout at a motorcycle repair shop during a supposed drug deal gone bad on 25 May 2020 at the height of the COVID-19 pandemic in Mexico. 1,522 infections and 132 deaths were reported in the state on 30 May, with 26 infections and eight deaths in Zitácuaro.

== Tourism ==
=== Presa del bosque ===
Presa del bosque is an important dam built between 1951 and 1954 by the Commission Federal de Electricidad. The Presa del Bosque is supplied by the Zitácuaro River (or San Juan Viejo), the San Isidro and a tributary of the Tuxpan River. It is located 1,742 meters above sea level. The dam has a capacity of 248 million cubic meters and belongs to the Miguel Alemán hydroelectric system. Its water is conducted to the regulatory dam of Colorines in the State of México. The water is used in hydroelectric plants in Ixtapatongo, Santa Barbara and Tingambato. It is located 5 kilometers from the south of the Zitácuaro beside the Zitácuaro-Huetamo Road. The main entrance is from the pueblo colonia linda vista and the dam is surrounded by the towns of La Y Griega, La Encarnacion, La Palma, Los Sapotes and other smaller communities. It is a tourist destination, and fishing, camping and other activities are permitted. The area is especially popular in Holy Week when the municipal authorities organize various activities.

People swim in the dam water because of its mythical curing powers. It is also a popular area for football, volleyball, riding and other recreational pursuits.
