= San Juan Soconusco =

The indigenous community of San Juan Soconusco (also spelled Xoconusco), is located in the municipality of Donato Guerra, in the State of Mexico in the country of Mexico. The town's economic initiatives have gained its recognition from the State of Mexico in 2007. Among these the establishment of agro-industry and fish farming in the area.

One interesting initiative is the creation of a nursery specifically to provide plants to the Reserva de la Biosfera Mariposa Monarca (Monarch Butterfly Biosphere Reserve). The nursery produces up to 800,000 plants a year and with these, the biosphere is able to work on recovering the area with native plants.
