= Ocampo Municipality =

There are several municipalities in Mexico called Ocampo:

- Ocampo Municipality, Chihuahua
- Ocampo Municipality, Coahuila
- Ocampo Municipality, Durango
- Ocampo Municipality, Guanajuato
- Ocampo Municipality, Michoacán
- Ocampo Municipality, Tamaulipas

See also

- Ocampo (disambiguation)
