= Ocampo =

Ocampo may refer to:

== People ==
- Ocampo (surname)

== Places ==
=== Mexico ===
- Ocampo Municipality (disambiguation)
- Ocampo, Chihuahua, a town
- Ocampo, Coahuila, a city
- Ocampo Flora and Fauna Protection Area, a protected area near Ocampo, Coahuila
- Ocampo, Guanajuato, a city
- Melchor Ocampo, State of Mexico
- Ocampo, Michoacán
- Melchor Ocampo, Nuevo León
- Ocampo, Tamaulipas
- Melchor Ocampo Municipality, Zacatecas

=== Elsewhere ===
- Ocampo, Camarines Sur, Philippines, a municipality
- Ocampo Street, Manila, Philippines
- Ocampo (crater), on Mars
- Villa Ocampo, San Isidro, Buenos Aires, Argentina, the former house of writer and intellectual Victoria Ocampo

== See also ==
- Ocampos, a surname
- Ocampa, a fictional race of humanoids in the Star Trek universe
