= Homero Gómez González =

Mexican environmental activist (died 2020)

- Born: c. 1970
- Died: January 2020 (aged 50); Ocampo, Michoacán, Mexico
- Education: Chapingo Autonomous University
- Occupations: Environmental activist, agricultural engineer, politician

Homero Gómez González (1969 or 1970 – January 2020) was a Mexican environmental activist and agricultural engineer. He was a manager of El Rosario Monarch Butterfly Preserve, a component of the Monarch Butterfly Biosphere Reserve, and commissioner of El Rosario, Michoacán, a community in the municipality of Ocampo.

== Career ==
Homero Gómez González grew up in El Rosario in eastern Michoacán. He came from a logging family and was a logger before becoming an environmental and anti-logging activist. He was a skeptic of conservation efforts, fearful that ending logging activities would lead to poverty. He studied at Chapingo Autonomous University and became an agricultural engineer. Gómez later saw the potential for tourism and formulated the idea of a sanctuary. He collaborated with conservationists at the World Wildlife Fund and scientists.

By the early 2000s, Gómez had stopped logging and was persuading others to do the same when the impacts of deforestation became apparent. Logging is now illegal in Rosario. He became the municipal president and commissioner of El Rosario and was succeeded by Miguel Angel Cruz. Gómez managed and served as spokesperson of the El Rosario Monarch Butterfly Preserve, a component of the Monarch Butterfly Biosphere Reserve.

He used social media to share images of monarch butterflies. Gómez was a prominent butterfly activist. He led efforts to keep loggers out of the reserve and organized marches, demonstrations, and anti-logging patrols. He worked with the government to increase the stipend local farmers could receive for preserving trees. Gómez managed 150 hectares of reforested land. He encouraged 260 communal land owners to reforest corn fields. He was a representative of the ejido in El Rosario.

== Personal life ==
Gómez resided in Ocampo, Michoacán, with his wife, Rebeca Valencia González. They had at least one son.

== Disappearance and death ==
Gómez was last seen alive on 13 January 2020 attending a meeting in the village of El Soldado. His brother stated he was last seen on 13 January at a fair with Ocampo mayor, Roberto Arriaga Colín and other municipal officials. His family reported him missing the next day. They received phone calls from individuals claiming to have kidnapped him, asking for ransom payments, which human rights activist Mayte Cardona said the family paid. Over 200 volunteers joined the search for Gómez. The entire police force of Ocampo and Angangueo were detained for questioning. More than two weeks after his disappearance, his body was found in an agricultural reservoir in Ocampo. He was 50 years old at the time of his death. Because of his work combating illegal logging, and because Raúl Hernández Romero—another activist connected to the butterfly sanctuary—was also found dead a few days later, it has been speculated that he was targeted by organized criminals. Gloria Tavera, an official with the National Commission of Protected Natural Areas stated they believe Gómez's death was not related to his activism. Michoacán state prosecutors initially found no signs of violence on the body, but a later autopsy revealed that Gómez had suffered a head injury before drowning. State prosecutor, Adrián López Solís reported that robbery does not appear to be a motive as nearly US$500 (more than 10,000 pesos) in cash was found on Gómez's body.

Shortly after Gómez's body was recovered, the body of Raúl Hernández Romero was found. Hernández was a tour guide at the same reserve as Gómez; it is unknown if the two deaths are connected.

=== Reactions ===
Michoacán Governor Silvano Aureoles Conejo expressed hope that Gómez would be found alive. Mexican President Andrés Manuel López Obrador called Gómez's death "regrettable" and "painful". Poet and environmentalist Homero Aridjis stated to the Associated Press that "if they can kidnap and kill the people who work for the reserves, who is going to defend the environment in Mexico?"

The director of the World Heritage Centre, Mechtild Rössler, as well as Miguel Clüsener-Godt, director of the Man and the Biosphere Programme, both expressed sadness and concern after the death of Gómez.

In Germany, the first "flower field passage" against species extinction was named "González Romero Blühwiesenkorridor - Blumiger Landkreis Osnabrück" (also as a tribute to the environment activist Raúl Hernández Romero)

The deaths of Gómez and Hernandez led to calls for better protection of environmental defenders.
