= Valle de Bravo =

Valle de Bravo, State of Mexico
- Municipality
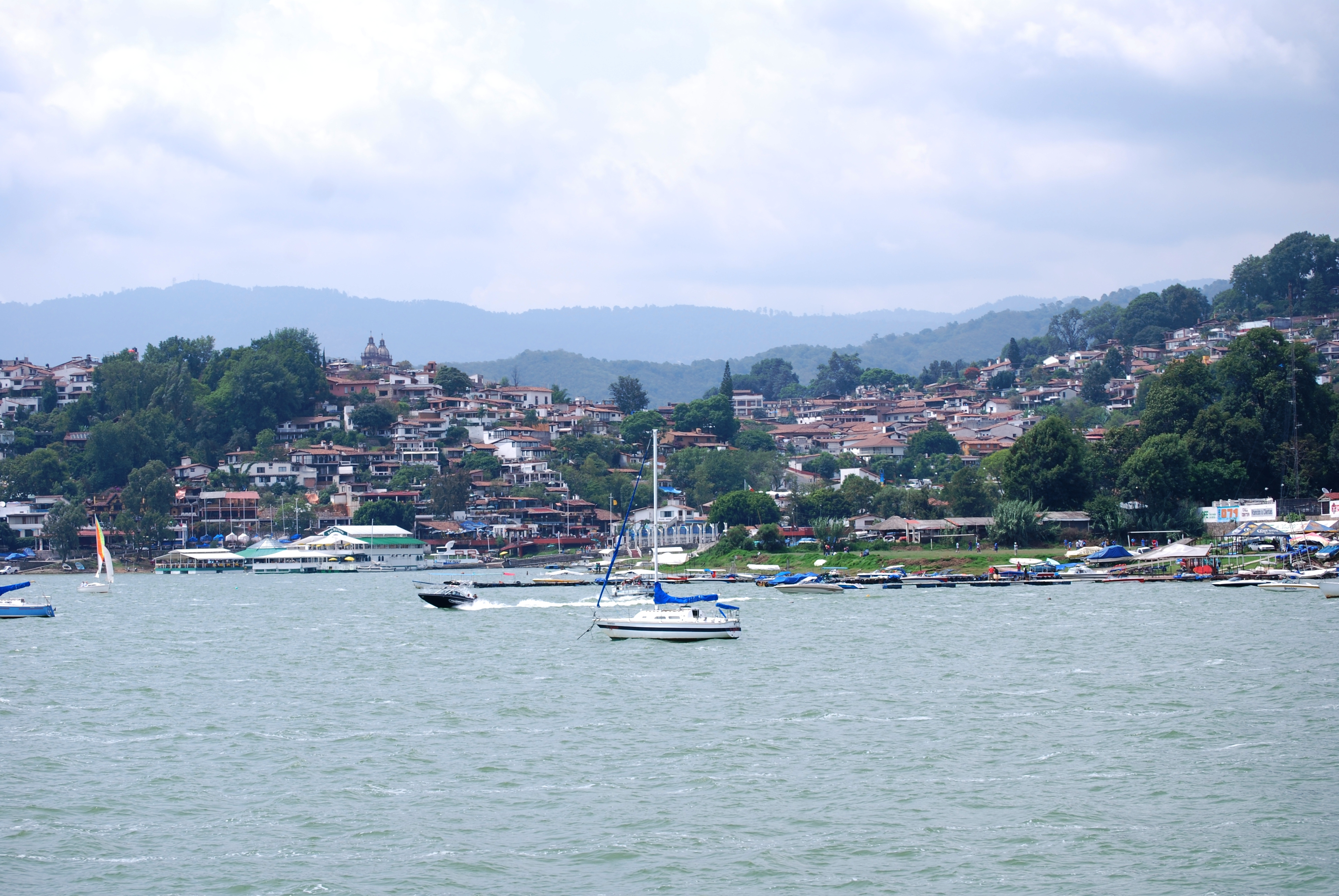
- Panorama of the town from the lake

- Location within State of Mexico Location within Mexico
- Coordinates: 19°11′33″N 100°07′50″W
- Country: Mexico
- State: Mexico State
- Municipal Seat: Valle de Bravo
- Town Founded: 1530

Government
  - Municipal President: Michelle Núñez Ponce (2022–2024)
- Elevation: 1,850 m (6,070 ft)

Population (2020)
  - Total: 61,590
  - Demonym: Vallesano
- Time zone: UTC-6 (Central Standard Time)
- Postal code: 51200

Valle de Bravo (Latin American Spanish: [ˈbaʝe ðe ˈβɾaβo]) is one of 125 municipalities in the State of Mexico, Mexico. The largest town and municipal seat is the town of Valle de Bravo. It is located on the shore of Lake Avándaro, approximately 156km (97 miles) southwest of Mexico City and west of Toluca on highways 15, 134 or 1. It takes about two hours to drive from Mexico City to Valle de Bravo, making it a popular weekend getaway for the capital's affluent upper class.

The town has several names during its history including San Francisco del Valle de Temascaltepec, Temascaltepec de indios, Villa del Valle, and San Francisco del Valle. The original names including Temascaltepec caused confusion with the nearby "Real de Minas de Temascaltepec", now Temascaltepec, so the county was known as "El Valle" (The Valley). The honorific "de Bravo" was added later to recognize Nicolás Bravo who fought at the Castle of Chapultepec during the Mexican–American War. Its Coat of arms includes the image of a temazcal in reference to its original name.

In 1971, Valle de Bravo was known as typical city (ciudad típica) and magical town (pueblo mágico) in 2005. The town and the surrounding area are well known in Mexico as a tourist destination, mainly due to its relative proximity to Mexico City and for having hosted the world-famous Circuito Avandaro auto racing event and Festival de rock y Ruedas, a massive rock music festival.

== Toponymy ==
The original name of Valle the Bravo was Valle de Temascaltepec, from the náhuatl temazcalli "steam bath", and tepetl "hill", the full meaning of which is "Hill of steam baths".

== The town ==
=== History ===
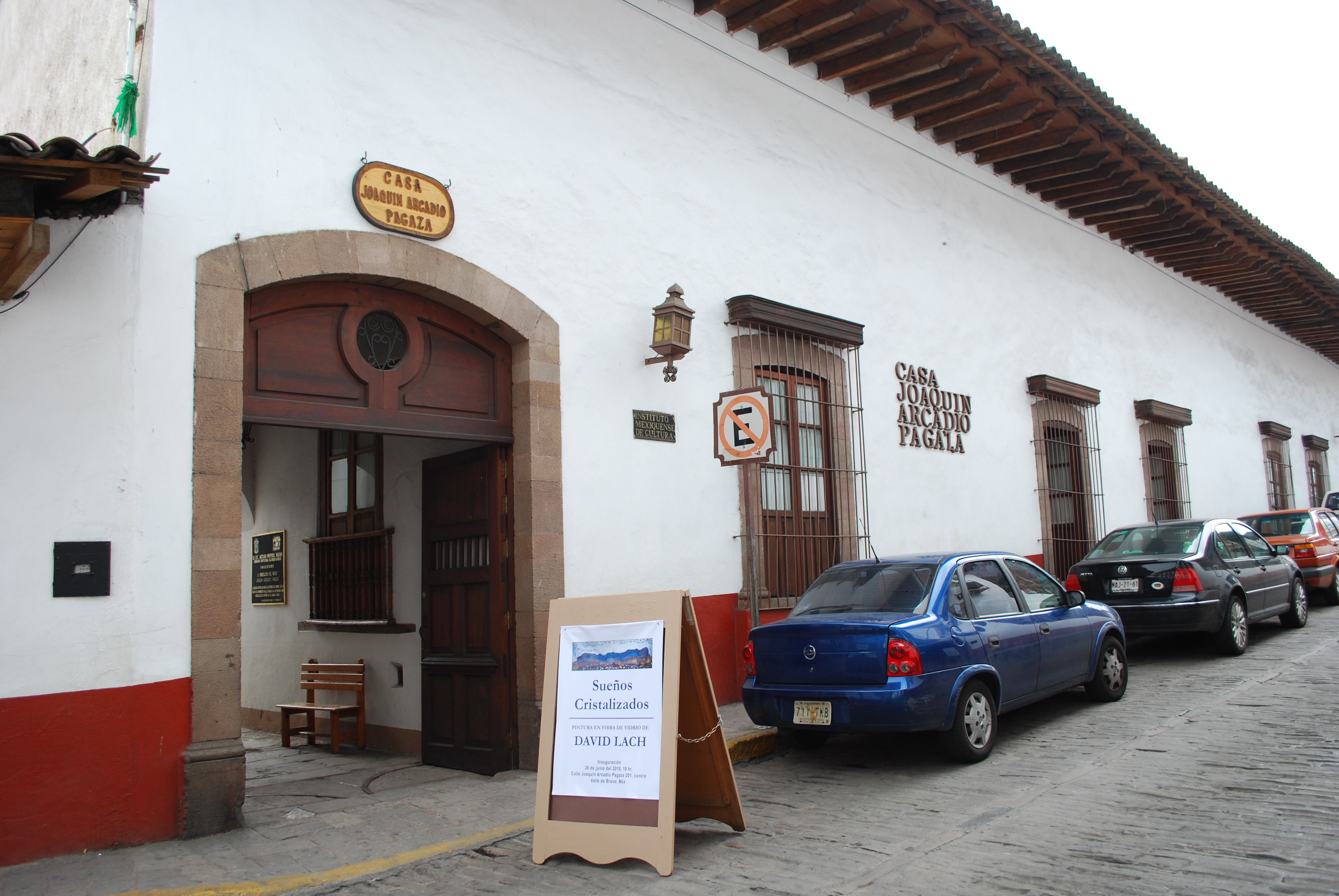
House of Joaquín Arcadio Pagaza

The first to arrive in the area were the Matlatzinca, who settled mostly in the present-day communities of Santa Maria Ahuacatlán, La Peña and Otumba. Between 1474 and 1479, the Aztec tlatoani Axayacatl conquered the region, establishing what would be the last addition to the Aztec Empire. After the destruction of Tenochtitlan by The Spanish and their native allies, campaigns to subdue the area were carried out by Andrés de Tapia and Gonzalo de Sandoval, followed by evangelization by the Dominicans and the Augustinians. Around 1530, the Franciscan friar Gregorio Jiménez de la Cuenca founded the town as a congregation called "El Pino". Between 1607 and 1615, a Franciscan convent was established here, giving the town that grew up around it its original name of San Franciscano del Valle de Temascaltepec.

The town suffered greatly during the Mexican War of Independence due to the monarchy's attempts to repress the rebellion there. Another short-lived rebellion occurred in 1834 when Carlos Guadalupe Tepixtoco Abad proclaimed his plan to re-establish the empire of Moctezuma. However, most people considered the cause to be ridiculous and the movement quickly died out. The village gained town status in 1842 and city status in 1878. In the beginning of the 19th century, Professor G. Velázquez wrote the poem "Valle de Bravo en la poesía de Pagaza", describing the region's beauty. The town also saw incursions by Zapatistas during the Mexican Revolution.

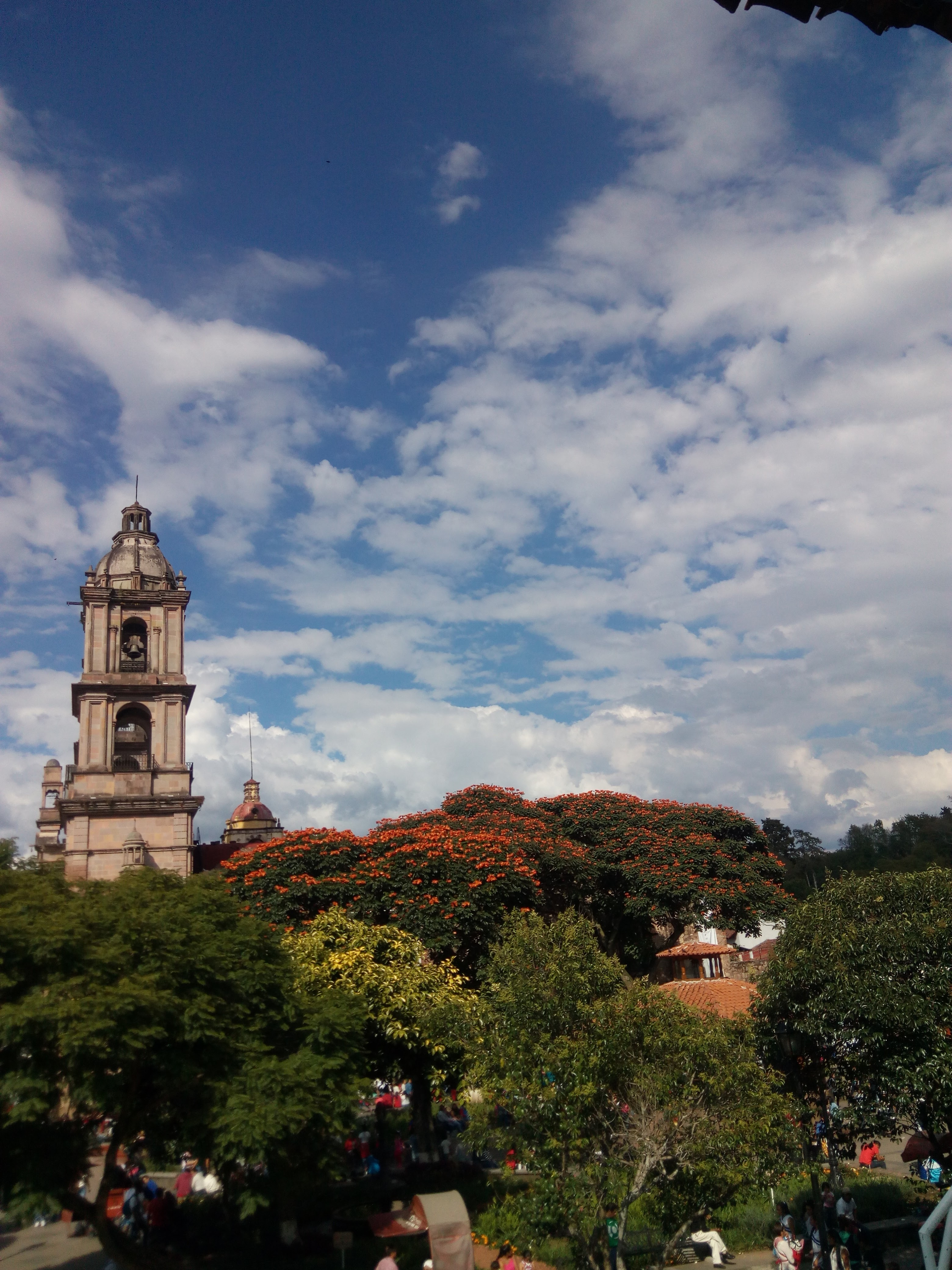
View of Plaza and Cathedral in Valle de Bravo

In the 20th century, the geographic configuration of the landscape changed. In 1937, the Federal Commission on Electricity began plans for an electrical plant called Ixtapantongo, later called the Miguel Alemán hydroelectric system. Construction began in 1938 and ended in 1947 ending with a Villa Victoria Dam that flooded 2,900 hectares, creating the current reservoir which extends all the way to the state of Michoacán. The electrical plant generates 458,775 kilowatts and forms a part of the water system supplying Mexico City. The town is situated on a small plateau at the foot of several hills at the edge of this lake. During the 1960s the place became world-famous for its auto racing event Circuito Avandaro which was suspended in 1969 after pilot Moisés Solana's fatal accident. On 11–12 September 1971, Valle de Bravo became the Mexican Woodstock as a large gathering of between 200,000 and 300,000 hippies from all over the country, Central and North America arrived in town to take part in the massive Festival de rock y ruedas Avandaro held in the hamlet of Tenantongo. As of 2005 it had a population of 22,166. The dam is actually a series of dams named Valle, Tilostoc, Colorines, Ixtapantongo and the newest at Santo Tomás de los Plátanos. With the creation of the lake came the development of exclusive resort facilities such as hotels, golf clubs, country cabins, sailing clubs and a myriad of restaurants.

=== Economy ===
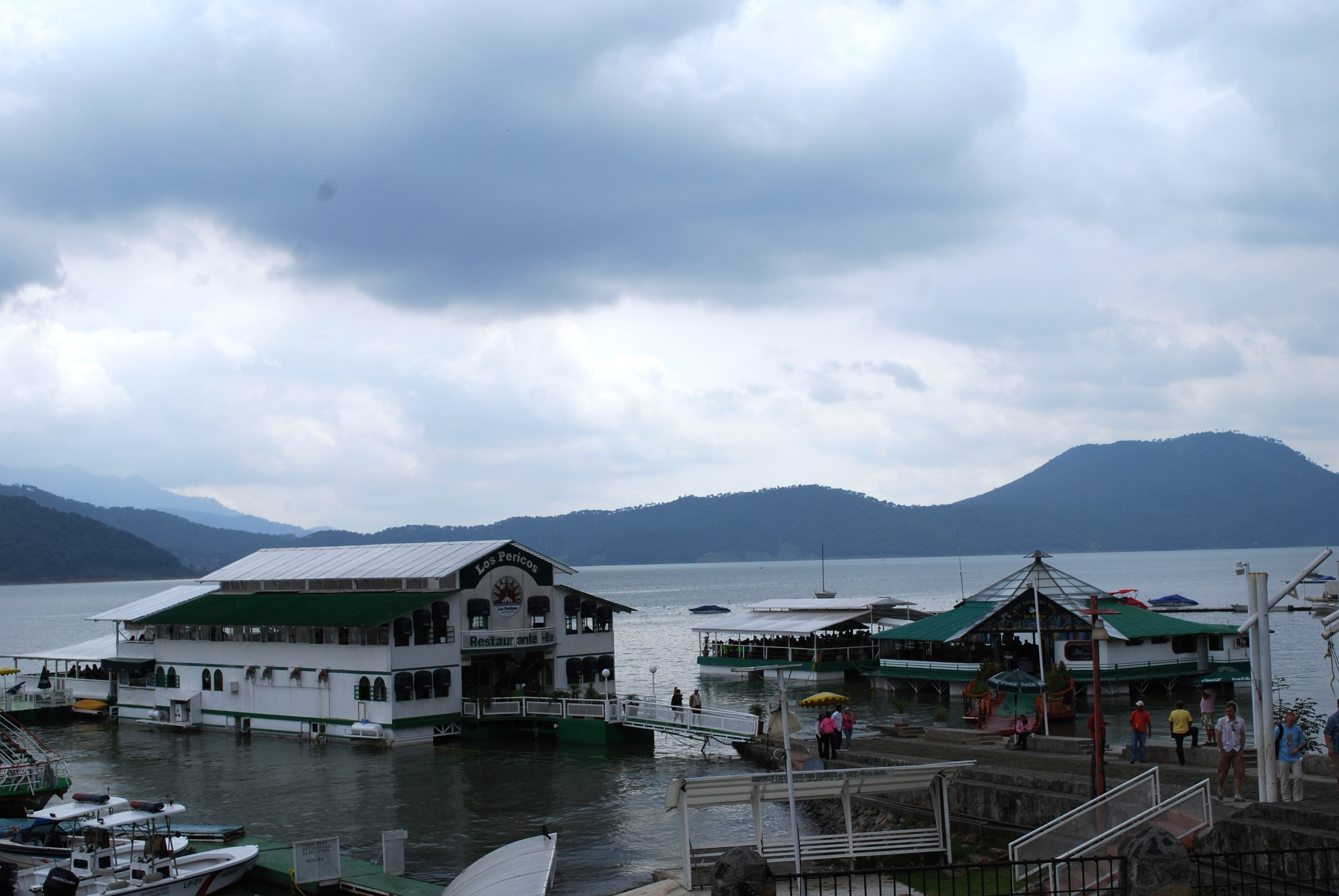
Municipal docks and lake

The town's principal economic activities center around tourism. It is a very popular location for weekend visits, especially from residents of Mexico City and Toluca. Holidays such as New Year's Eve and Semana Santa bring large numbers of visitors to the town leading to strong recommendations to arrange lodging well in advance. Other yearly events include the Festival Vallesano (March) where people participate in sporting, horseback-riding, art exhibitions and food-tasting events as well as cultural and musical performances. However, the largest annual celebration is the cultural festival known as the Festival de las Almas (Festival of the Souls) which has occurred each of the last five years in late September or early October. The 2007 festival brought in 4.5 million pesos to the area with 8 days of festivities, 151 programmed events centered on film, dance, art exhibitions, music, literature, workshops and theater, as well as Day of the Dead altars. It has spread to include events in Apaxco, Cuautitlán Izcalli, Ciudad Nezahualcóyotl, Temascalcingo, Texcoco and Toluca. This event featured "Alan" State Dance Troupe from Ossetia Alania, Russia as well as artists from thirteen other countries. Roughly 160,000–170,000 people attended the event.

=== Tourist attractions ===
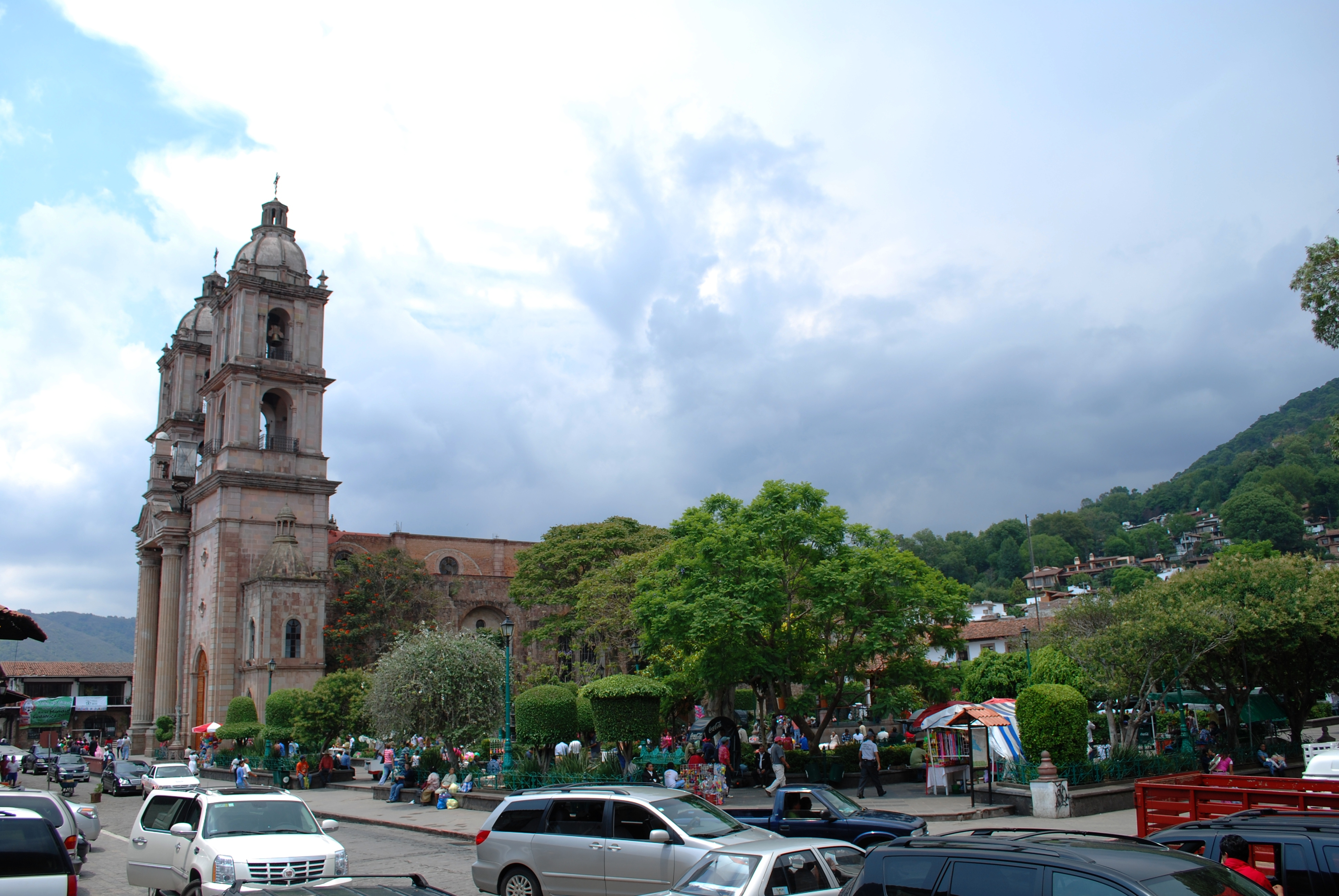
Main plaza and San Francisco de Asis Church

The Temple of Santa María Ahuacatlán was originally a chapel when it was started in 1864 but has been converted into a church which is still under construction. The main altar contains a Black Christ which is still worshipped. Inside the church are extremely large canvases by Phillippa, an English artist who was recently commissioned. These canvases depict the relationship between Mazahua legend and the Black Christ.

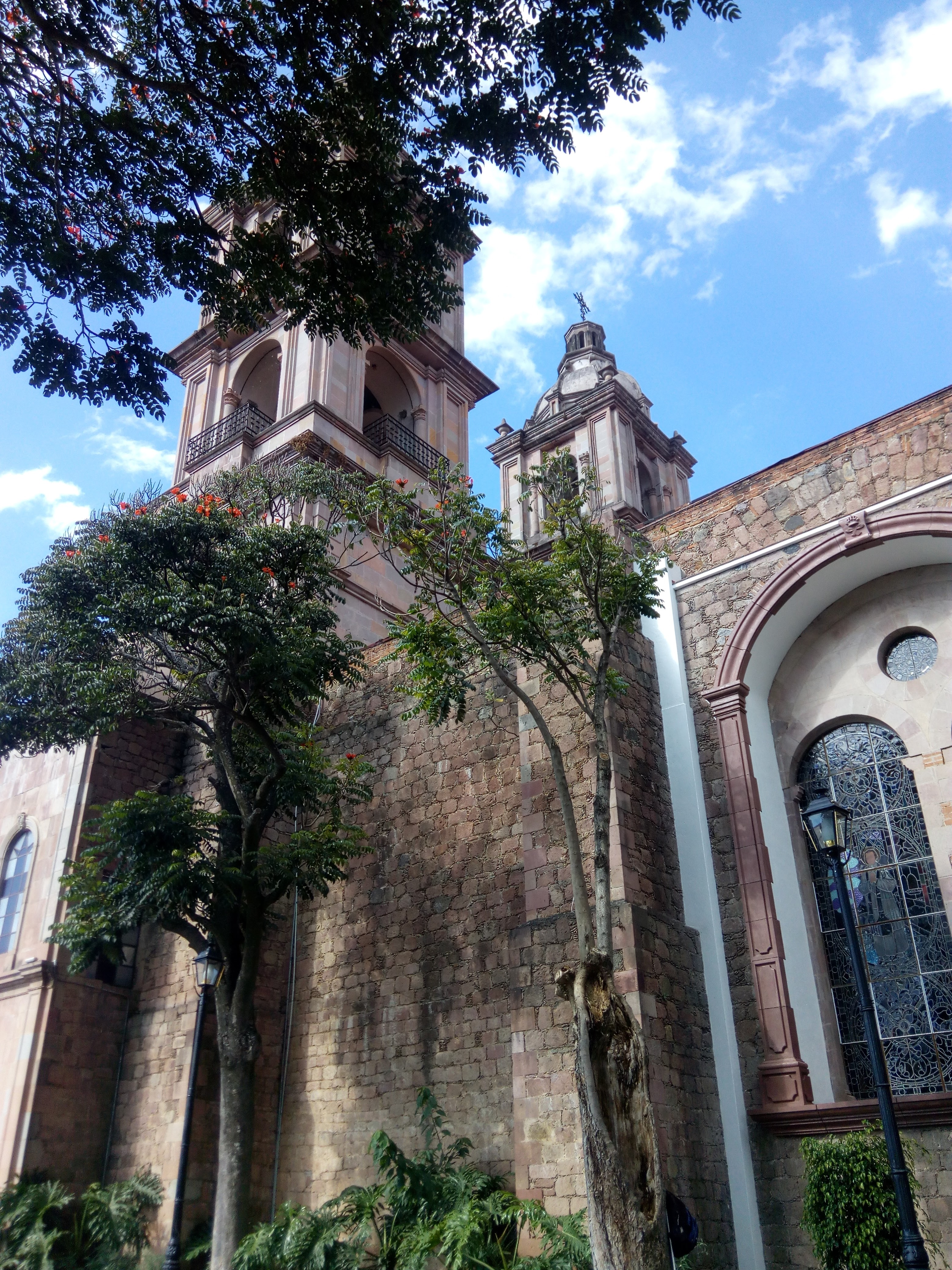
Cathedral

The Parish of Saint Francis of Asisi used to have two very large naves constructed by the Franciscans, one nave for the Spanish and one for the indigenous people. All that is preserved from the 17th century are the baptismal font, the holy water font and a carving of Saint Francis which is located in a vaulted niche in the present-day main nave. Other, more recent features of the church include murals and Italian oil paintings. The main bell was cast during the Mexican Revolution. The third and main nave was constructed in the 1950s in which all residents of the town participated; however, this project was not completed until 1994.

The Casa de la Cultura (House of Culture) is located in front of the municipal dock on Lake Avandaro. Classes are given there in activities such as aerobics, music and painting to children and adults. It also hosts conferences and workshops on natural medicine as well as art expositions. The complex includes a library, a ballroom, a cafe, exhibition rooms and an auditorium. Also, the workshop of painter Ismael Ramos is found here.

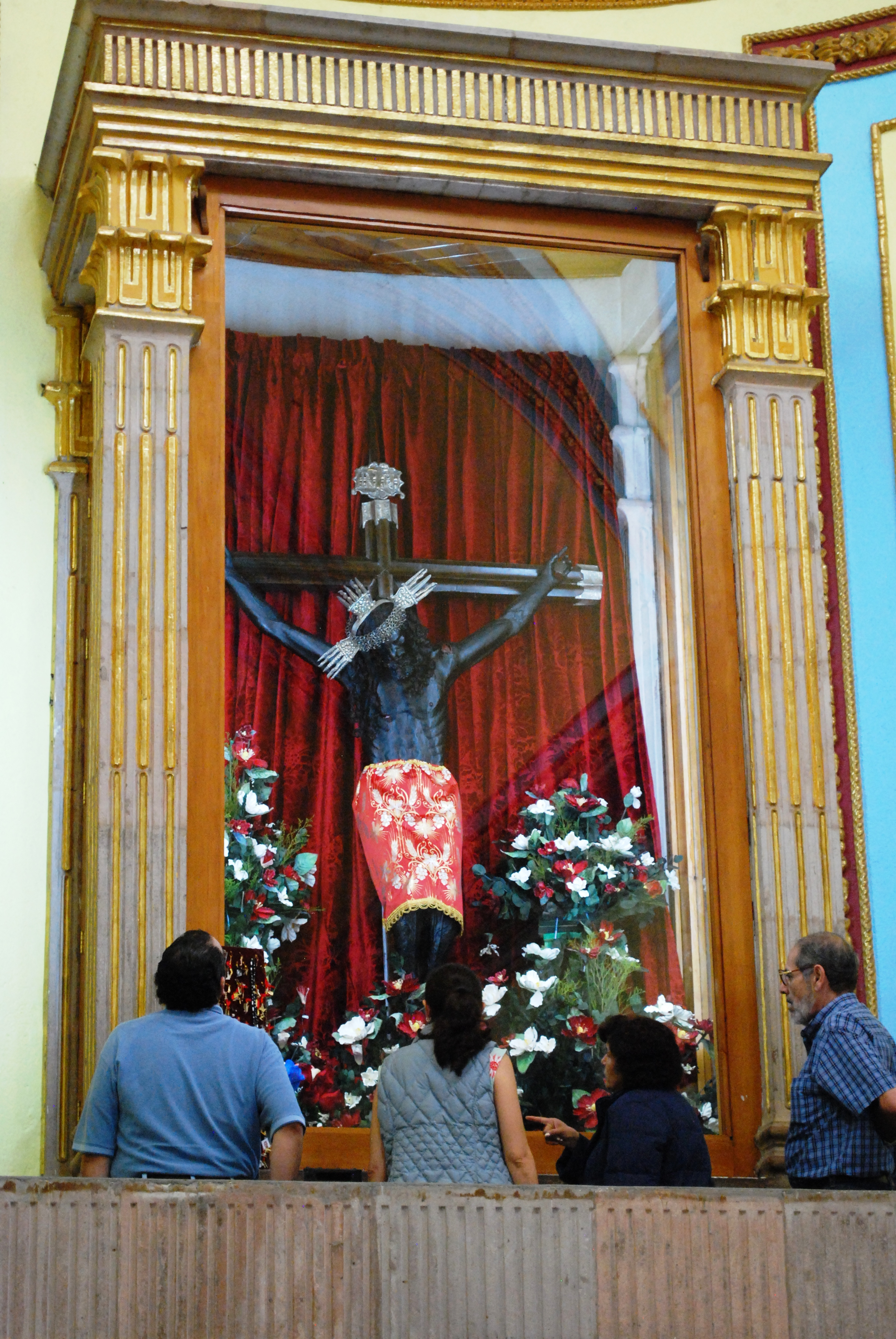
The "Black Christ" of the Temple of Santa Maria Ahuacatlán

The Joaquín Arcadio Pagaza Museum is dedicated to the conservation, research and spread of the region's cultural history. It features objects that were the property of Don Joaquín Arcadio Pagaza, a notable person here. It displays paintings and sculpture from local, national and international artists. It also supports literature by sponsoring conferences, films, theatre and other events. It also offers courses and workshops in fine arts, music and literature as well as a library.

The Municipal Boardwalk and Dock, on the edge of Lake Avandaro, is the main attraction in the town. There are a number of restaurants on the boardwalk and some that float alongside the dock. On weekends, artists display and sell their work here. Boats for excursions on the lake can be rented here as well as horses. It's an artificial lake. On the banks of this river there are more than 42 nautical clubs for navigation, sailing, and water-skiing.

The Jardín Central (Central Garden) is located on the side of the Parish of San Francisco. There is live music at the bandstand on Sunday afternoons and street food such as corn, campechanas, tacos, pambazos and traditional ice cream for sale. A bust of Nicolás Bravo, for whom the town was named, also stands in this location.

Valle de Bravo is popular for aerial sports, including paragliding, hang gliding, and ultralight aviation. The Fédération Aéronautique Internationale selected Valle de Bravo to host the 2009 Paragliding World Championship, which attracted approximately 150 competitors from more than 40 countries. The region also hosts the Monarca Paragliding Open, an annual competition held in Valle de Bravo and Temascaltepec, which held its ninth edition in January and February 2011. Hang gliding also has an international presence in the area, with events involving local and visiting pilots, and Wills Wing's primary manufacturing facility is located there. Every year in February, the El Peñon Classic Race hang gliding competition is held at the El Peñon site, 30 minutes from Valle de Bravo. In addition, ultralight flying is practiced by people of various ages, with tandem flights available for first-time flyers.

Valle de Bravo was named a "Pueblo Mágico" in 2005.

== The municipality ==
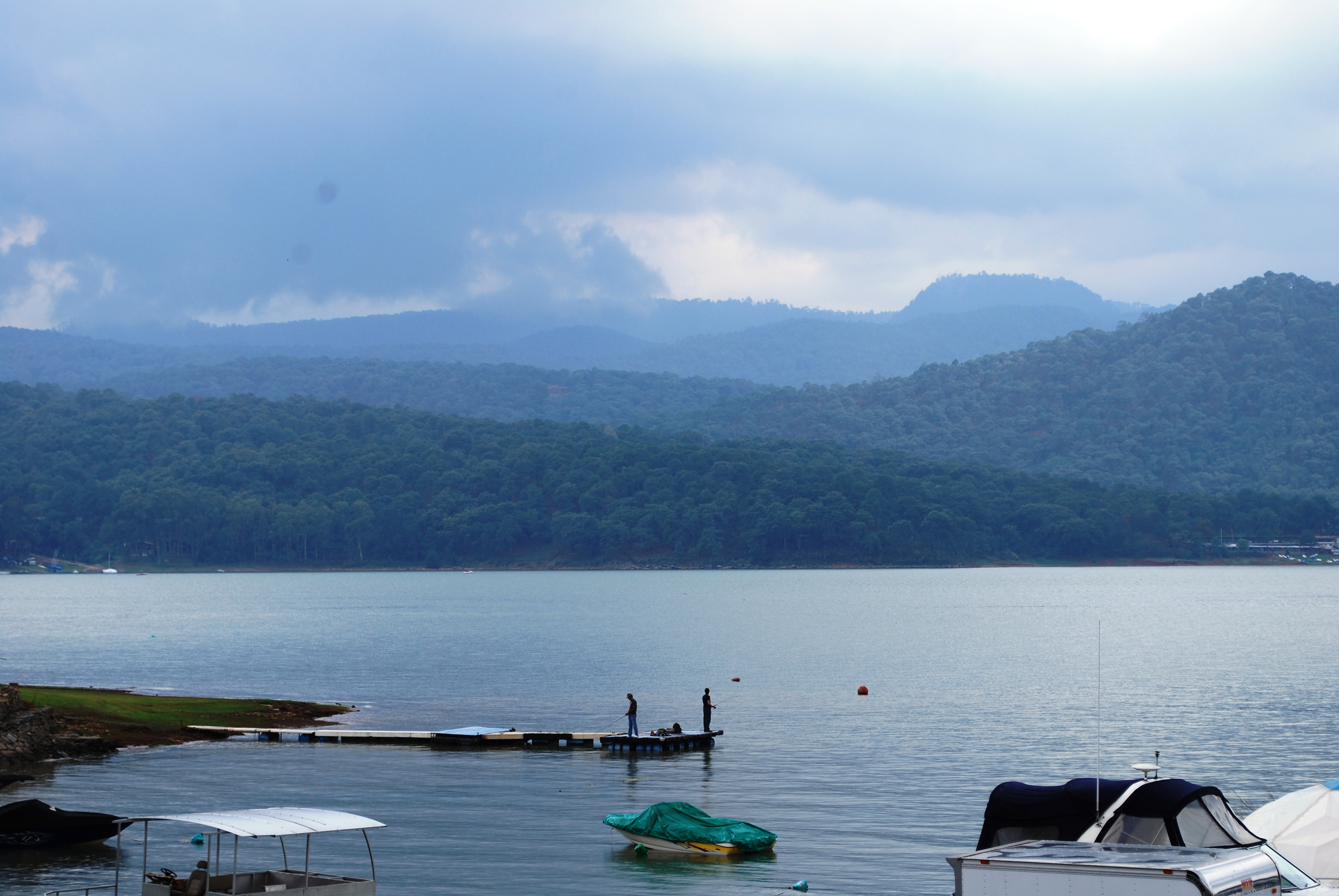
View of the lake and some of the surrounding mountains

As municipal seat, the town of Valle de Bravo has governing jurisdiction over the following communities: San Mateo Acatitlán, El Aguacate, Los Álamos, Calderones, La Candelaria, El Castellano, El Cerrillo (San José el Cerrillo), La Compañía (Cerro Colorado), Cerro Gordo, Colorines, Loma Bonita, La Compañía (Tres Espigas), Cuadrilla de Dolores, Rancho Espinos, El Fresno (El Fresno la Compañía), Godínez Tehuastepec, La Laguna, Loma de Chihuahua, Loma de Rodríguez, El Manzano, Mesa de Jaimes, Mesa de Dolores (Mesa de Dolores 2a. Secc.), Los Pelillos, Peña Blanca, Los Pozos (Pinar de Osorios), Santa María Pipioltepec (Pipioltepec), San José Potrerillos (Potrerillos), Rincón de Estradas, San Antonio, San Gabriel Ixtla, San Gaspar, San Juan Atezcapan, San Nicolás Tolentino, San Ramón, San Simón el Alto, Santa Magdalena Tiloxtoc, Santa Rosa, Santa Teresa Tiloxtoc, Los Saucos, Tenantongo, La Volanta, Casas Viejas, Mesa Rica (La Finca), Mesa de Palomas, Atesquelites (Tres Quelites), La Boquilla (Cerro el Cualtenco la Boquilla), El Durazno, La Mecedora, Escalerillas, Tehuastepec (San José Tehuastepec), Tierra Grande (La Loma), El Arco, Barrio de Guadalupe, Las Joyas, Mata Redonda (Paso Hondo), Mesa de Dolores 1a. Secc. (Mesa del Rayo), La Palma, Piedra del Molino, Rancho Avándaro Country Club, El Aguacate (El Aserradero), Agua Fría, La Huerta San Agustín, Tres Puentes, Colonia Rincón Villa del Valle, Colonia Valle Escondido, Monte Alto, Las Ahujas, El Trompillo, Gallinas Blancas, Barranca Fresca, Santo Tomás el Pedregal, Los Tizates, as well as about 40 unnamed settlements. The total 2005 population of the municipality was 52,902.

Valle de Bravo became a municipality in 1852. It borders with the municipalities of Donato Guerra, Temascaltepec, Amanalco, Ixtapan del Oro, Santo Tomás de los Plátanos and Otzoloapan, with a territorial area of 421.95 km^{2}. This municipality belongs to the 7th Region of Mexico State. The counties Donato Guerra, Ixtapan del Oro, Santo Tomás de los Plátanos, Otzoloapan, and Zacazonapan also belong to this Region.

The municipality is surrounded by mountain ranges and other elevated areas covering about 50% of the total area and include the Sierra de Temascaltepec, Sierra de Tenayac, Sierra de Valle de Bravos as wells as the hills that roll around the mountain ranges. These elevations include a number of small volcanoes such as the "Cerro Gordo". 30% of the area is semi-flat with only 20% of the surface being plains. The main river of the area is the Río Balsas, whose system includes the tributaries of El Salto, Barranca Honda, Tiloxtoc rivers.

Valle de Bravo's weather is mildly humid. It rains during summer: it starts in June and ends in September. The warmest months are: May, June, July and August. The average temperature is 17.5 °C (63.50 °F). The minimum temperature is 1.3 °C (34.34 °F) and the maximum is 32 °C (89.60 °F).

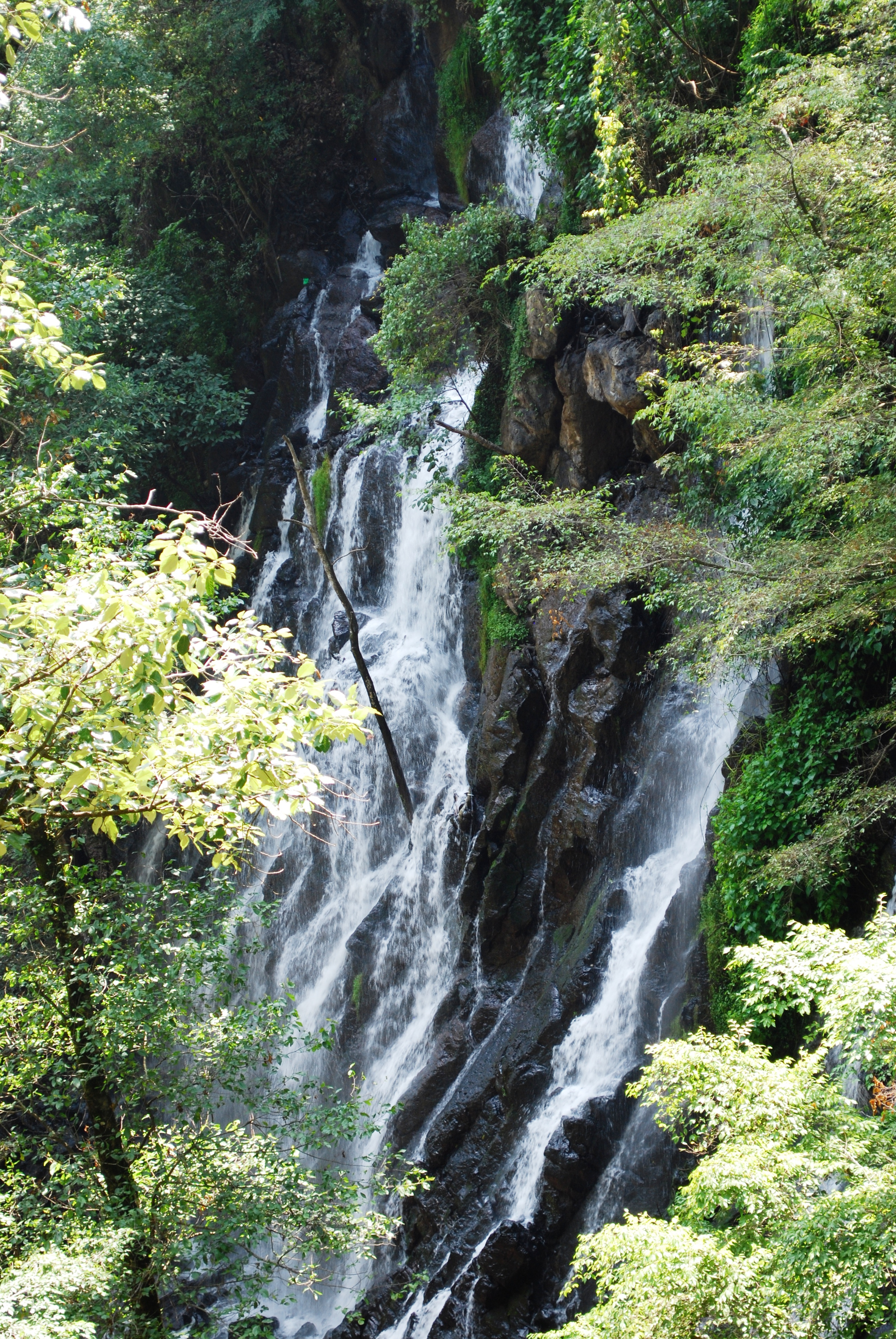
Velo de Novia waterfall

Just south of the town of Valle de Bravo is a small village called Avandaro, which hosted the "Rock y Ruedas" festival in September 1971. Just outside it is the Velo de la Novia (Bride's Veil) waterfall, where the San Juan creek drops 35 meters in the middle of relatively untouched forest. The area has been converted into a natural park.

The Maranatha Retreat lies just to the north of Valle de Bravo. It used to be a Carmelite convent, but today it is open to people of all faiths. It was built in the 1860s and 1870s by Father Miguel Angel Perez Alonso fusing elements of Byzantine, Mediterranean, Mexican Baroque and Asian architecture. Also to the north is the village of La Peña, which is on a high peak above the treeline. Here are some archeological remnants of Mazahua and Matlatzinca origin.

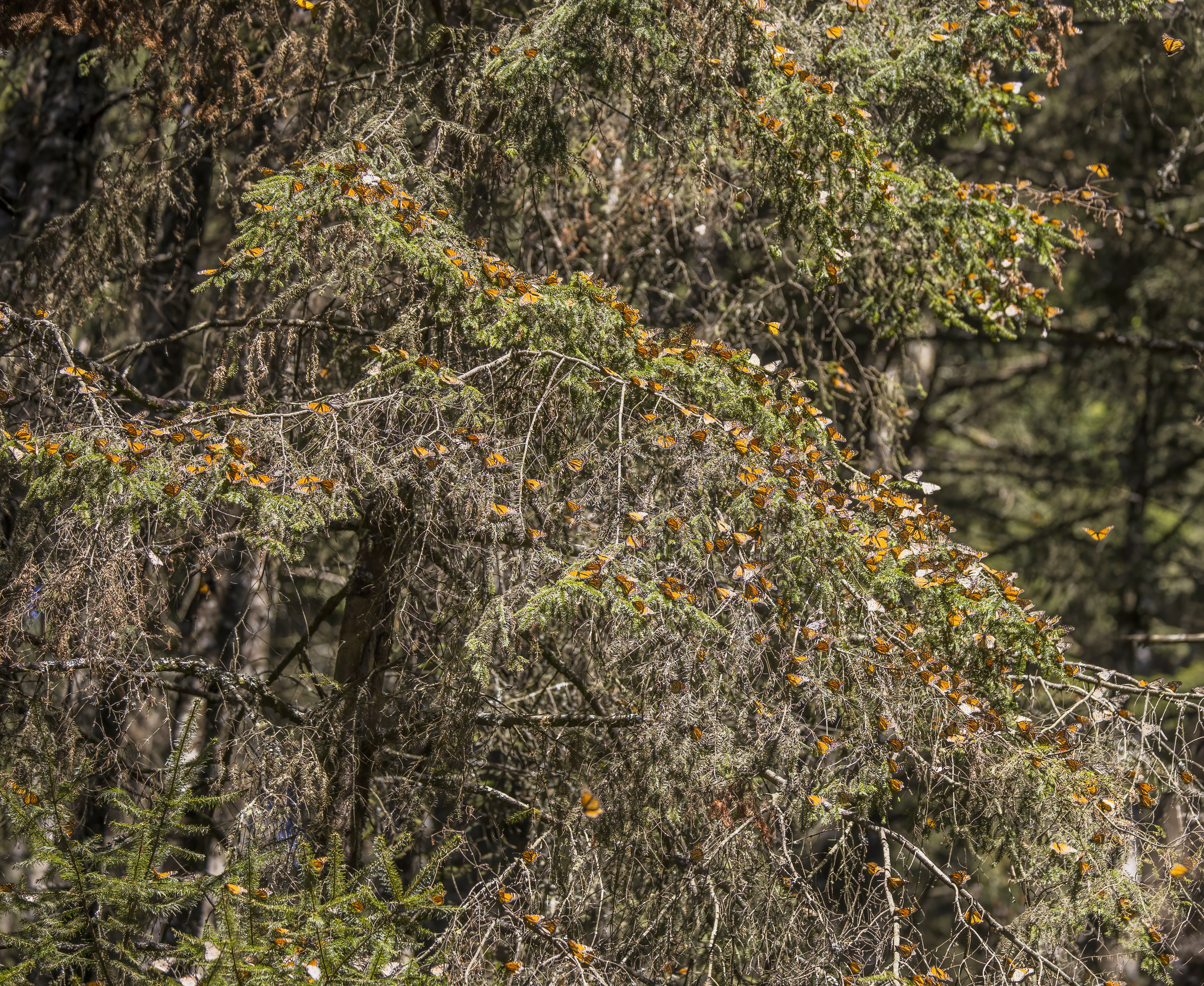
Monarch butterflies overwintering on Oyamel fir (Abies religiosa) in Piedra Herrada, within the Monarch Butterfly Biosphere Reserve (February 2023)

Valle de Bravo also lies in the wintering grounds of the monarch butterfly. Piedra Herrada, located 25 km east of the town on the north side of the Los Saucos highway, is a federal reserve for the protection of the butterflies. In this sanctuary, visitors can rent horses to explore the sanctuary as well as a guide. The butterflies can be found all winter long at the top of the mountaintop in the abundant fir trees.

Outside of the town of Valle de Bravo, agriculture is still intensively practiced, growing crops like corn, beans, potatoes, peas, fava biena, tomatoes onions and other vegetable and some other grains. Most crops are produced for autoconsumption but some, like potatoes and peas are grown for commercial purposes. Some livestock is also raised here, but it is nearly all for autoconsumption. There is also some industrial production, mainly of ceramics, furniture and construction materials. The Valle de Bravo area attracts more than 3,751,822 persons annually, who contribute more than 2,617 million pesos annually to the municipality's economy, making it the key sector to municipal development. 60% of the municipality's jobs are generated through tourism.

The municipality has indigenous communities with Nahuas, Matlatzinca and Purépecha and their languages can be heard. Most of the people living there are Catholic, but there are also Protestant and evangelical Christians.

== See also ==
- Feast of Saint Francis
