= Ocampos =

Ocampos is a surname. Notable people with the surname include:

- Clementino Ocampos (1913–2001), Paraguayan composer and poet
- Fátima Ocampos (born 2003), Paraguayan handball player
- Leticia Ocampos (born 1980), Paraguayan architect and First Lady of Paraguay
- Lucas Ocampos (born 1994), Argentine footballer
- Otelo Ocampos (born 1983), Paraguayan footballer
- Pablo Daniel Zeballos Ocampos (born 1986), Paraguayan footballer
- Santiago Ocampos (born 2002), Paraguayan footballer
- Zenón Franco Ocampos (born 1956), Paraguayan chess grandmaster

== See also ==
- José Domingo Ocampos, a town in Paraguay
- Ocampo (disambiguation)
