= Ocampo (surname) =

Ocampo is a surname of Galician origin. It derives from a common Galician toponym meaning 'the field', from the Galician definite article o (masculine singular) + campo 'field' (Latin campus), or a habitational name, from a town of the same name in Lugo, Galicia.

== Geographical distribution ==
As of 2014, 25.2% of all known bearers of the surname Ocampo were residents of the Philippines (frequency 1:1,207), 21.9% of Mexico (1:1,697), 21.9% of Colombia (1:653), 10.6% of Argentina (1:1,204), 5.7% of the United States (1:18,945), 2.0% of Paraguay (1:1,079), 1.8% of Peru (1:5,388), 1.7% of Ecuador (1:2,862), 1.6% of Nicaragua (1:1,150), 1.2% of Honduras (1:2,217), 1.1% of Bolivia (1:2,818), 1.1% of Costa Rica (1:1,334) and 1.0% in Spain (1:14,442).

In Spain, the frequency of the surname was higher than national average (1:14,442) in the following autonomous communities:

1. Galicia (1:3,702)
2. Community of Madrid (1:9,796)
3. Canary Islands (1:9,987)
4. Balearic Islands (1:10,045)
5. Cantabria (1:13,558)
6. Asturias (1:14,245)

In Colombia, the frequency of the surname was higher than national average (1:653) in the following departments:

1. Caldas Department (1:118)
2. Quindío Department (1:147)
3. Risaralda Department (1:165)
4. Antioquia Department (1:286)
5. Valle del Cauca Department (1:337)

== People ==
- Adriana Ocampo (born 1955), American planetary geologist
- Ambeth Ocampo (born 1961), Filipino historian, academic, journalist, and author
- Carlos Ocampo (born 1995), Mexican boxer
- David Samanez Ocampo (1866–1947), President of Peru in 1931
- Ed Ocampo (1938–1992), Filipino basketball player and coach
- Galo Ocampo (1913–1985), Filipino heraldist and painter
- Hernando R. Ocampo (1911–1978), Filipino painter and national artist
- Jahir Ocampo, Mexican diver
- José Antonio Ocampo (born 1952), Professor at Columbia University and former Minister of Finance of Colombia
- Juan Antonio Ocampo (born 1989), Mexican footballer
- Juan Jesús Posadas Ocampo (1926–1993), Mexican Catholic archbishop and cardinal
- Louie Ocampo (born 1960), Filipino composer
- Luis Moreno Ocampo (born 1942), Argentine lawyer and chief prosecutor of the International Criminal Court
- Miles Ocampo (born 1997), Filipina actress
- Miguel Ocampo (1922–2015), Argentine painter and diplomat
- Melchor Ocampo (1814–1861), Mexican lawyer, scientist and liberal politician
- Mónica Ocampo (born 1987), Mexican footballer
- Octavio Ocampo, Mexican painter and sculptor
- Satur Ocampo (born 1939), Filipino politician, journalist and writer
- Sebastián de Ocampo, 16th-century Spanish explorer of Cuba
- Silvina Ocampo (1903–1993), Argentine poet and writer, sister of Victoria Ocampo
- Victoria Ocampo (1890–1979), Argentine writer and intellectual
- Yoel Ocampo(December, 2003) Mexican Producer Artist

== See also ==
- Ocampo (disambiguation)
