= Donato Guerra, State of Mexico =

Donato Guerra
- Municipality
- Coat of arms
- Interactive map of Donato Guerra
- Coordinates: 19°18′30″N 100°08′32″W
- Country: Mexico
- State: State of Mexico
- Municipal Status: 1861

Government
  - Municipal President: Arturo Piña García (2006–2009)
- Elevation (of seat): 2,200 m (7,200 ft)

Population (2005) Municipality
  - Municipality: 29,621
  - Seat: 921
- Time zone: UTC-6 (Central)
- Postal code (of seat): 51030
- Website: http://www.donatoguerra.gob.mx/

Donato Guerra is one of 125 municipalities in the State of Mexico, Mexico. Its municipal seat is the town of Villa Donato Guerra, which is the 13th largest town in the municipality of Donato Guerra. The area is also known as Malacatepec (meaning 'hill in the shape of a spindle) and La Asunción Malacatepec. (Villa) Donato Guerra is located in the western part of the State of Mexico. In the region that is identified with Valle de Bravo. The town was named in 1880 in honor of Donato Guerra, a distinguished soldier of the War of La Reforma. It is located around 77 kilometers from Toluca which is the capital of the state, on Federal Highway number 35 Mexico City - Zitácuaro.

== The town ==
Villa Donato Guerra lies at an altitude of 2,000 meters above sea level. The area was Mazahua territory until between 1474 and 1477 when it came under Mexica domination. It remain mostly populated by Mexicas until 1604. Franciscan friars constructed the Parish of Asuncion Malacatepec around 1550. As late as 1727, the town still had a commissioner of the Spanish Inquisition, naming lawyer Jose Bernal and Mendoza in that year. In 1770, a land and natural resources dispute arose between the towns of La Asunción Malacatepec and San Lucas Texcaltitlán, versus the owners of the haciendas of La Asunción, San Felipe Neri, Joloxtoc, and Endo. The town was formally recognized as an ayuntamiento in 1826 by the State of Mexico.

In the 2005 census, the village had only 921 people.

Villa Donato Guerra's churches are St Martin Bishop, San Simon de la Laguna, San Francisco Mihualtepec, San Miguel Xooltepec and San Juan Xoconusco. The ruins of the Hacienda la Asuncion and Hacienda El Molino San Felipe Neri are examples of colonial constructions and are preserved as historical monuments.

== The municipality ==
The municipality of Donato Guerra has governing jurisdiction over the following communities: Cabecera de Indígenas, Primer y Segundo Cuartel, San Martín, San Antonio Hidalgo, Batán Chico, Batán Grande, Mesas Altas de Xoconusco, El Capulín, Llano Redondo, Macheros, Barrio de Arriba, La Fundición, San José Tilostóc, Galeras, Ranchería de Santiago Huitlapaltepec, San Agustín de las Palmas, San Lucas Texcaltitlán, Santiago Huitlapaltepec, San Juan Xoconusco, San Martín Obispo, San Antonio de la Laguna, San Simón de la Laguna, San Francisco Mihualtepec, San Miguel Xooltepec.

=== History ===
In 1569, the region of Malacatepec, is recognized as separate from Almoloya de Juarez. On April 8, 1604, Marques de Montesclaros by mandate of Pedro de Campos, signs the agreement that divides to the region of Malacatepec in two congregations, Asuncion Malacatepec and San José.

On October 30, 1810, the Battle of Monte de las Cruces took place with what is now the current municipality, where the forces of General Miguel Hidalgo triumphed. A number of Mazahuas took part in this battle as well with distinction.

The current municipality is officially formed in 1870.

=== Natural geography ===
Donato Guerra is located in the region known as Sierra Mil Cumbres, with the peaks of this mountain area reaching 3,040 meters above sea level. At its southern border, begins tropical terrain.

45.29% of the territory is covered by forests. The main kinds of trees are pine, cedar, eucalyptus, ash, weeping willow, and oak. These trees can be used to obtain wood. Trees that give fruit are: avocado, chirimoya, walnut, plum, capulín, tejocote etc. There are also some plants that can be used for medicinal purposes such as: epazote, chamomile, yerba buena, wormwood, arnica, juniper, clover, papalo, pig weed, and fennel.

The main mammals that can be found are rabbits, coyotes, zool deers, zool hares, squirrels, rats, tlacuaches, cacomixtles, dogs, horses, cows, and pigs.

Avian life is constituted by huilotas, carpenter birds, owls, buzzards, falcons, orn ravens, and pigeons. Reptiles such as snakes (of various species), scorpions, iguanas and lizards are found as well.

=== Population ===
In 1950, Donato Guerra had 10,514 inhabitants. 30 years later, in 1980, it had grown to only 13,671. However, the population census of 1990 registered 21,510 inhabitants. In the last census in 2005 the total population for the municipality was 29,621. 74.05% live in rural areas and 25.95% live in urban areas.

=== Economy ===
Since most people live in the rural areas, agriculture, both the raising of crops and livestock is the principal economic activity, with 9,016 hectares are devoted to the agricultural use. Principal livestock are cows, pigs, sheep, horses, hens, turkeys, beehives and rabbits. However, some industry exists in small factories, family workshops and craft cooperatives, clothes, shoes and bakeries.

=== Chronology of the municipal presidents ===
Name Period Politic partid

- Wenceslao Sáenz 1913
- Prospero María Yereno 1914–1916
- Wilebaldo Gómez 1917
- Pablo Reyes 1918
- Dario Reyes Barcenas 1919
- Antonio Usandizaga 1920
- José María Cambrón PML 1920
- Jorge Sánchez 1921
- Alberto Usandizaga PML 1921
- Jesús G. Avila 1922
- Antonio Usandizaga 1923
- Alberto Usandizaga 1924
- Anastacio R. Mendieta 1925
- José Félix Pliego 1926
- Guillermo Mendieta 1927
- Agustín Albarrán Fonseca 1928-1929 PNR
- Germán Reyes 1er. Regidor PML 1929 PNR
- Pedro Chamorro Mercado 1930-1931 PNR
- José García Argüello 1932-1933 PNR
- Agustín Albarrán Fonseca 1934-1935 PNR
- Armando Reyes J. 1936-1937 PNR
- Juan B. Bautista 1938-1939 PRM
- Jesús Mendieta 1er. Regidor PML 1939 PRM
- Manuel Reyes Muñoz 1940-1941 PRM
- José Mendieta Quintana 1942-1943 PRM
- José García Argüello 1944-1945 PRM
- Marcial Villegas Moreno 1946-1948 PRI
- Roberto Reyes Salguero PML 1948 PRI
- Jesús G. Avila 1949-1951 PRI
- Agustín Albarrán Fonseca 1952-1954 PRI
- Marcial Villegas Moreno (suplente) 1952-1954 PRI
- Lázaro Arriaga Escobar 1955-1957 PRI
- Agustín Albarrán Reyes 1958-1960 PRI
- Fidel Reyes Muñoz 1961-1963 PRI
- Roberto Reyes Salguero 1964-1966 PRI
- Agustín Albarrán Salguero 1967-1969 PRI
- Fernando Cuéllar Sánchez 1970-1972 PRI
- Arnulfo Villegas Jaramillo 1973-1975 PRI
- Santiago Avila Villegas 1976-1978 PRI
- Silvestre Torres Longares 1979-1981 PRI
- Prof. Elías Arzate Archunda 1982-1984 PRI
- Ing. Antelmo Mendieta Velázquez 1985-1987 PRI
- Arq. Héctor Jaime Sánchez García 1988-1990 PRI
- Germán Reyes García 1991-1993 PRI
- Ing. Lázaro Reyes González 1994-1996 PRI
- Arq. Jacobo Hernández Marín 1997-1998 PRI
- Prof. Ricardo Cruz Nieto PML 1998 PRI
- Prof. Mauro Noé Cuéllar Hernández 1998-2000 PRI
- Anselmo Vega Chico 2000-2003 PRI
- Tomás Octaviano Félix 2003-2006 PRD
- Arturo Piña García 2006-2009 PRD

=== Ethnic groups ===
The Mazahuas were the first group to inhabit the region of Malacatepec. In communities such as San Martín Bishop, San Simón de la Laguna, San Antonio de la Laguna, San Francisco Mihualtepec, San Juan Soconusco, San Miguel Xooltepec and Santiago Huitlapaltepec, indigenous language, food, customs and ethnicity are still preserved. Approximately 10.224 people speak Mazahua.

=== Education ===
In Donato Guerra, there are 36 kindergartens, 38 elementary schools, 2 middle schools and 1 high school, and there are 284 teachers that attend these schools. However, there are 5,728 inhabitants that have not received any schooling, of which 1,613 are children and 4,115 are adults.
