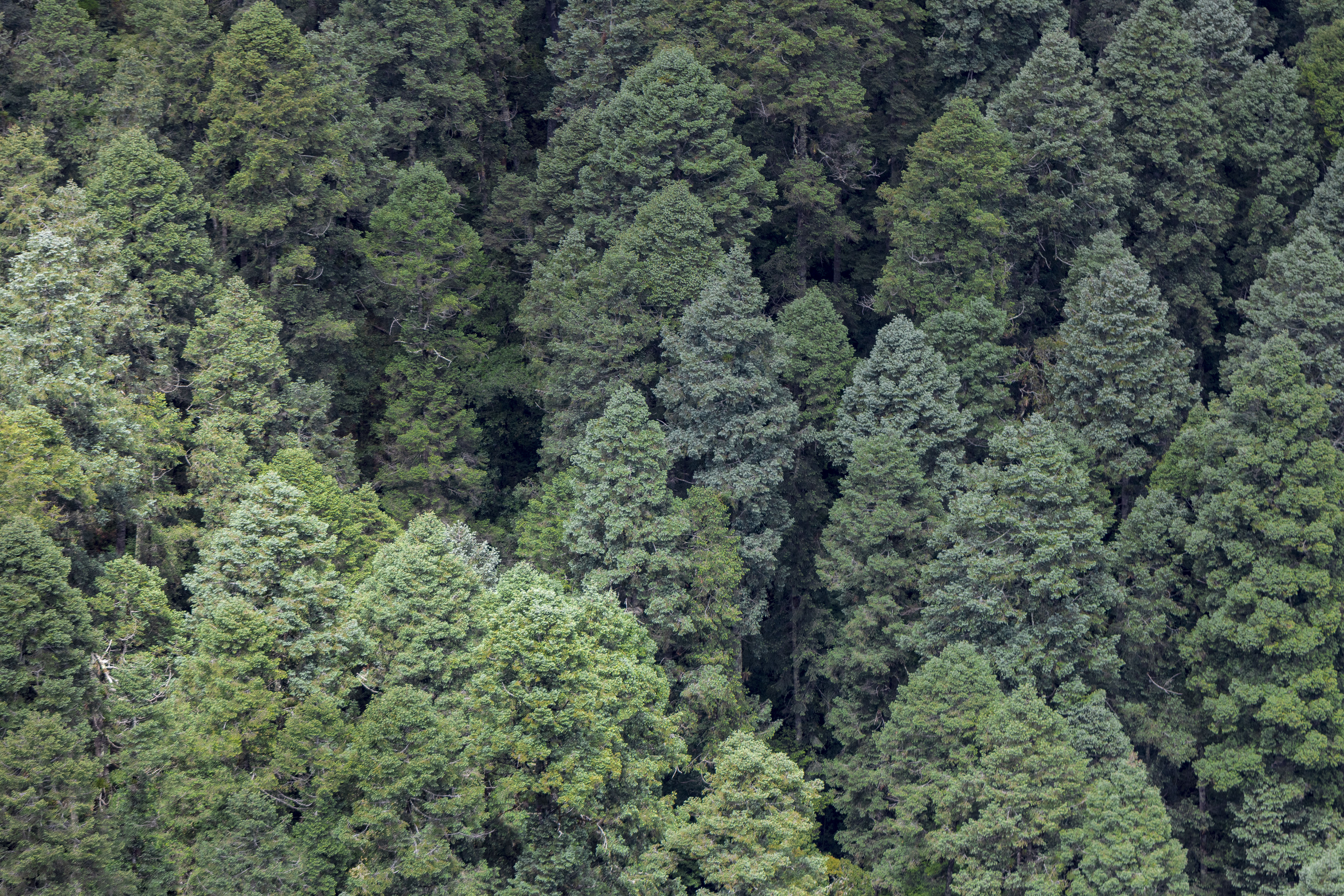
- Sacred fir forest at El Chico National Park in Hidalgo, Mexico

Conservation status
- Least Concern (IUCN 3.1)

Scientific classification
- Kingdom: Plantae
- Clade: Tracheophytes
- Clade: Gymnospermae
- Division: Pinophyta
- Class: Pinopsida
- Order: Pinales
- Family: Pinaceae
- Genus: Abies
- Species: A. religiosa

Binomial name
- Abies religiosa (Kunth) Schltdl. & Cham.

Synonyms
- Abies colimensis Rushforth & Narave F., H.; Abies glauca Roezl ex Gordon; Abies glaucescens Roezl; Abies hirtella (Kunth) Lindl.; Abies religiosa subsp. colimensis (Rushforth & Narave) Silba; Abies religiosa var. colimensis (Rushforth & Narave) Silba; Abies religiosa subsp. glaucescens (Roezl) Silba; Abies religiosa var. glaucescens Carrière; Abies religiosa var. hirtella (Kunth) Carrière; Abies religiosa var. lindleyana Carrière; Abies religiosa subsp. perotensis (Silba) Silba; Abies religiosa var. perotensis Silba; Abies tlapalcatuda Roezl; Picea glaucescens (Roezl) Gordon; Picea hirtella (Kunth) Loudon; Picea religiosa (Kunth) Loudon; Pinus hirtella Kunth; Pinus religiosa Kunth; Pinus religiosa var. minor Parl.

= Abies religiosa =

Species of conifer

Abies religiosa, the oyamel fir or sacred fir, (known as oyamel in Spanish) is a fir native to the mountains of central and southern Mexico (Trans-Mexican Volcanic Belt, Sierra Madre del Sur) and western Guatemala. It grows at high elevations of 2,100–4,100 metres (6,900–13,500 ft) in cloud forests with cool, humid summers and dry winters in most of its habitat regime. In the state of Veracruz, it grows with precipitation all year long. The tree is resistant to regular winter snowfalls which occur near the upper altitudinal limit of its growth.

== Names ==
The Spanish name oyamel comes from the Nahuatl word oyametl (oya, "to thresh"; metl, "agave"; literally "threshing agave"). It is also called árbol de Navidad (Christmas tree) in Mexico. The English name derives from the binomial Abies religiosa, literally "religious fir". This comes from the use of its cut foliage in religious festivals (notably at Christmas) and in churches in Mexico.

== Description ==
Abies religiosa is a medium-sized to large evergreen coniferous tree growing to 25–50 m (82–164 ft) tall with a trunk diameter of up to 2 metres (6.6 ft). The leaves are needle-like, flattened, 1.5–3.5 cm (0.59–1.38 in) long and 1.5 mm (0.059 in) wide by 0.5 mm (0.020 in) thick, dark green above, and with two blue-white bands of stomata below; the leaf apex is acute. The leaf arrangement is spiral on the shoot, but with each leaf variably twisted at the base so they lie flat to either side of and above the shoot, with none below the shoot. The shoots are reddish-brown, hairless or with scattered pubescence.

The cones are 8–16 cm (3.1–6.3 in) long and 4–6 cm (1.6–2.4 in) broad, dark blue-purple before maturity; the scale bracts are purple or greenish, of moderate length, with the tips exposed in the closed cone. The winged seeds are released when the cones disintegrate at maturity about 7–9 months after pollination. Trees from the western end of the range on Nevado de Colima, Jalisco have cones with larger, reflexed bract scales (similar to noble fir cones); these are sometimes treated as a separate species, Abies colimensis.

== Significance ==
The sacred fir is the preferred tree for the monarch butterfly (Danaus plexippus) to reside in colonies during its hibernation in the forests of the Trans-Mexican Volcanic Belt. Although monarch butterflies are known in other parts of the southern Mexican highlands as some specimens do not migrate, the bulk of them gather in a few protected fir forests in the Monarch Butterfly Biosphere Reserve near the towns of Angangueo (Michoacán) and Avándaro (State of Mexico), from December to March.

The wood of the sacred fir is rather soft and thus not very suited for woodworking. Nonetheless, its distribution is decreasing because of logging for fuel and other human-related disturbances.

A 2012 paper by Cuauhtemoc Saenz-Romero among others, published in Forest Ecology and Management found that "the area suitable for the oyamel is likely to diminish by 96 percent by 2090, and disappear completely within the [Monarch Butterfly Biosphere] reserve." By 2024, results from an ongoing assisted migration experiment by Saenz-Romero's science team had achieved success in higher elevation plantings of oyamel fir on a nearby volcanic mountain in anticipation of end-of-century climate change.

== Gallery ==
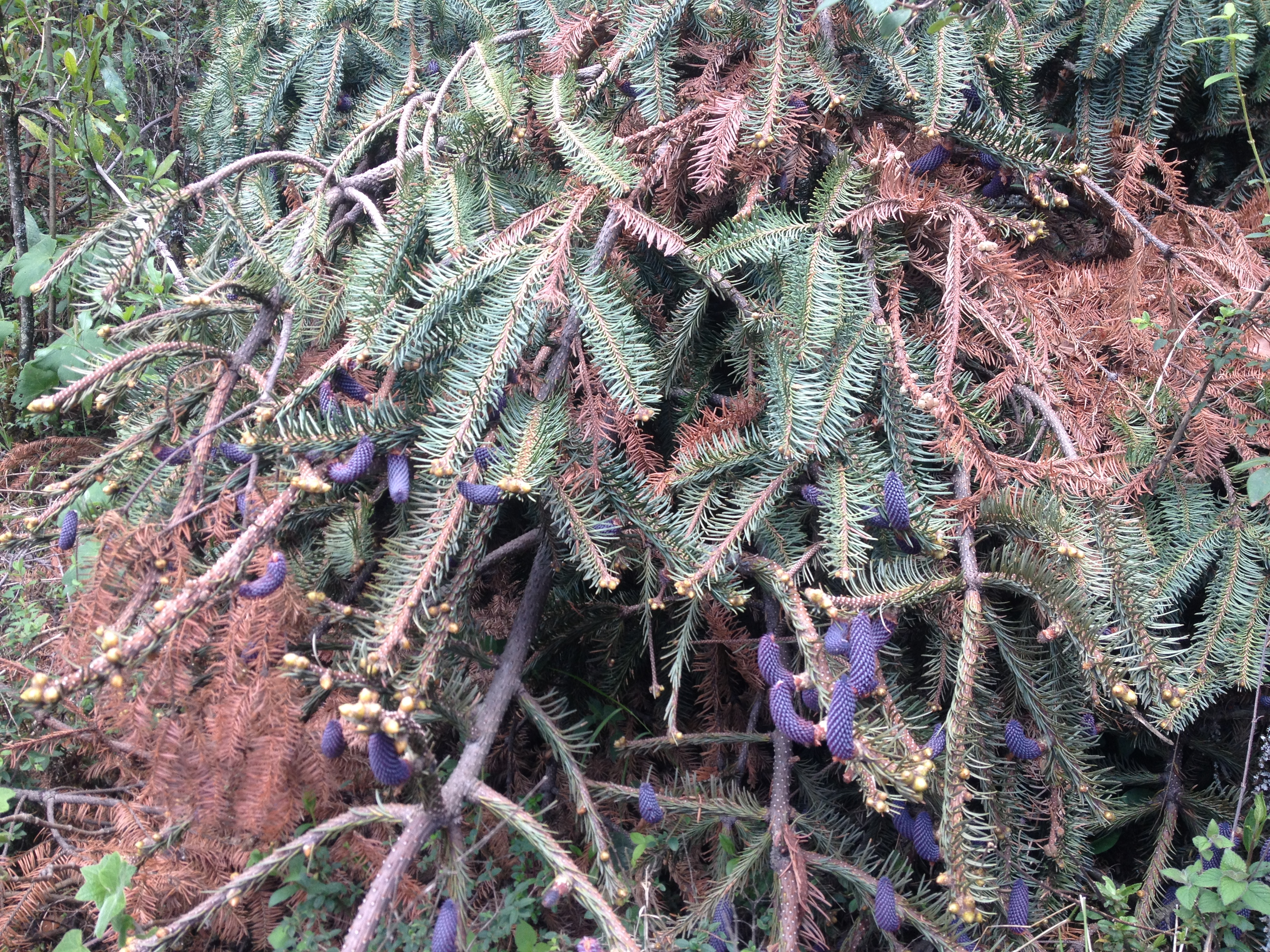
Detail of leaves and male cones

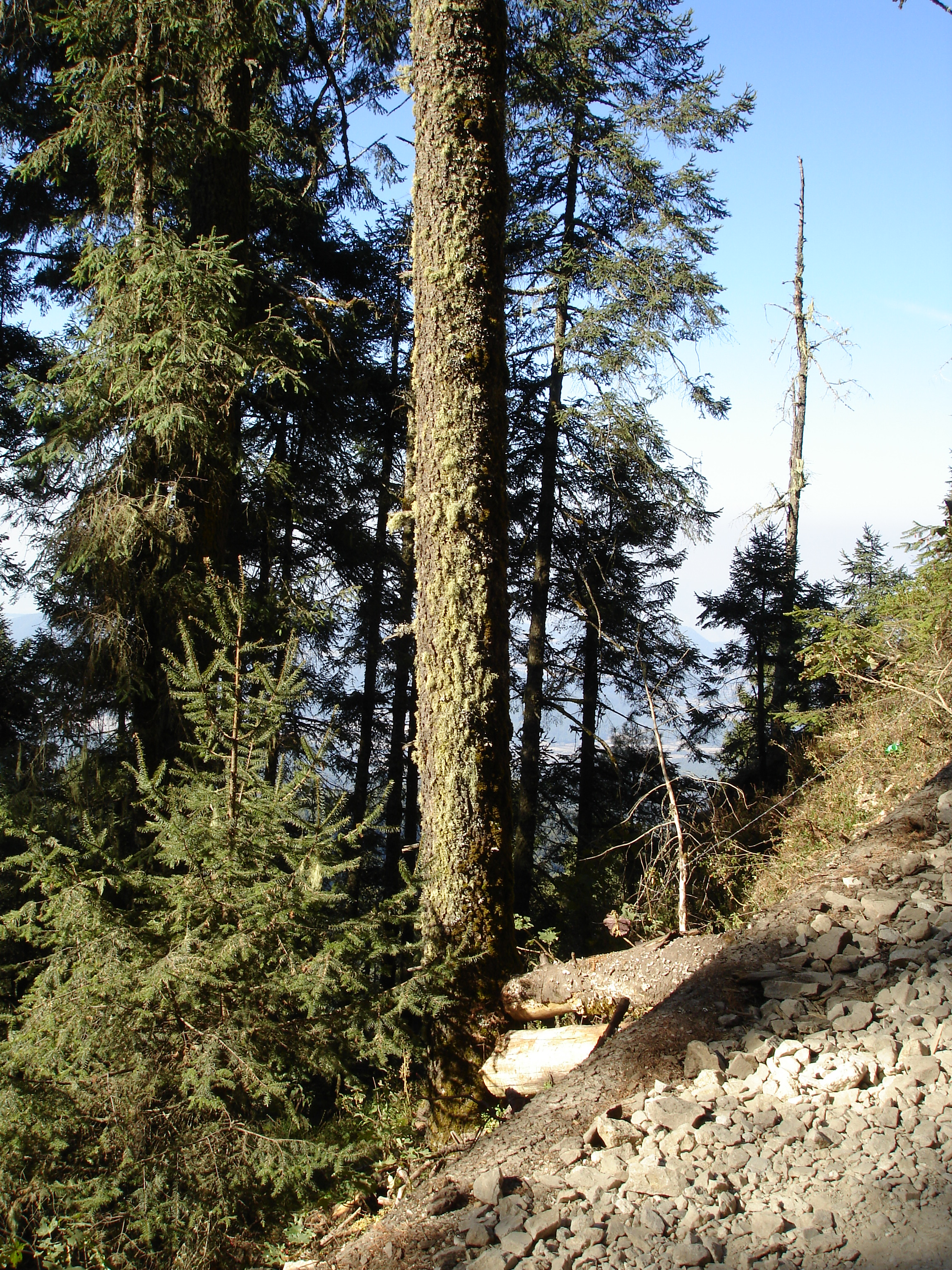
Chincua sanctuary, the Monarch Butterfly Biosphere Reserve

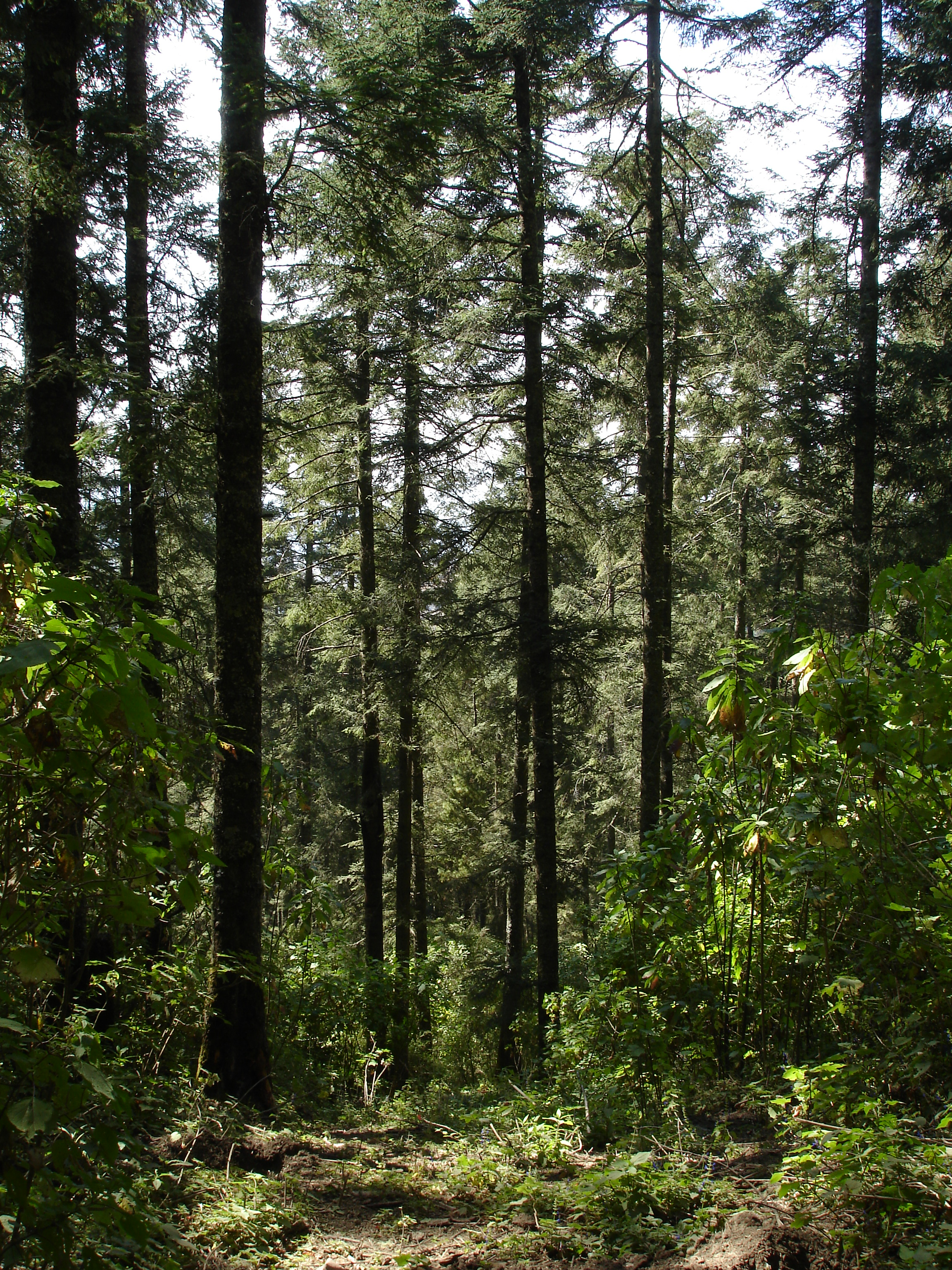
El Rosario sanctuary, the Monarch Butterfly Biosphere Reserve

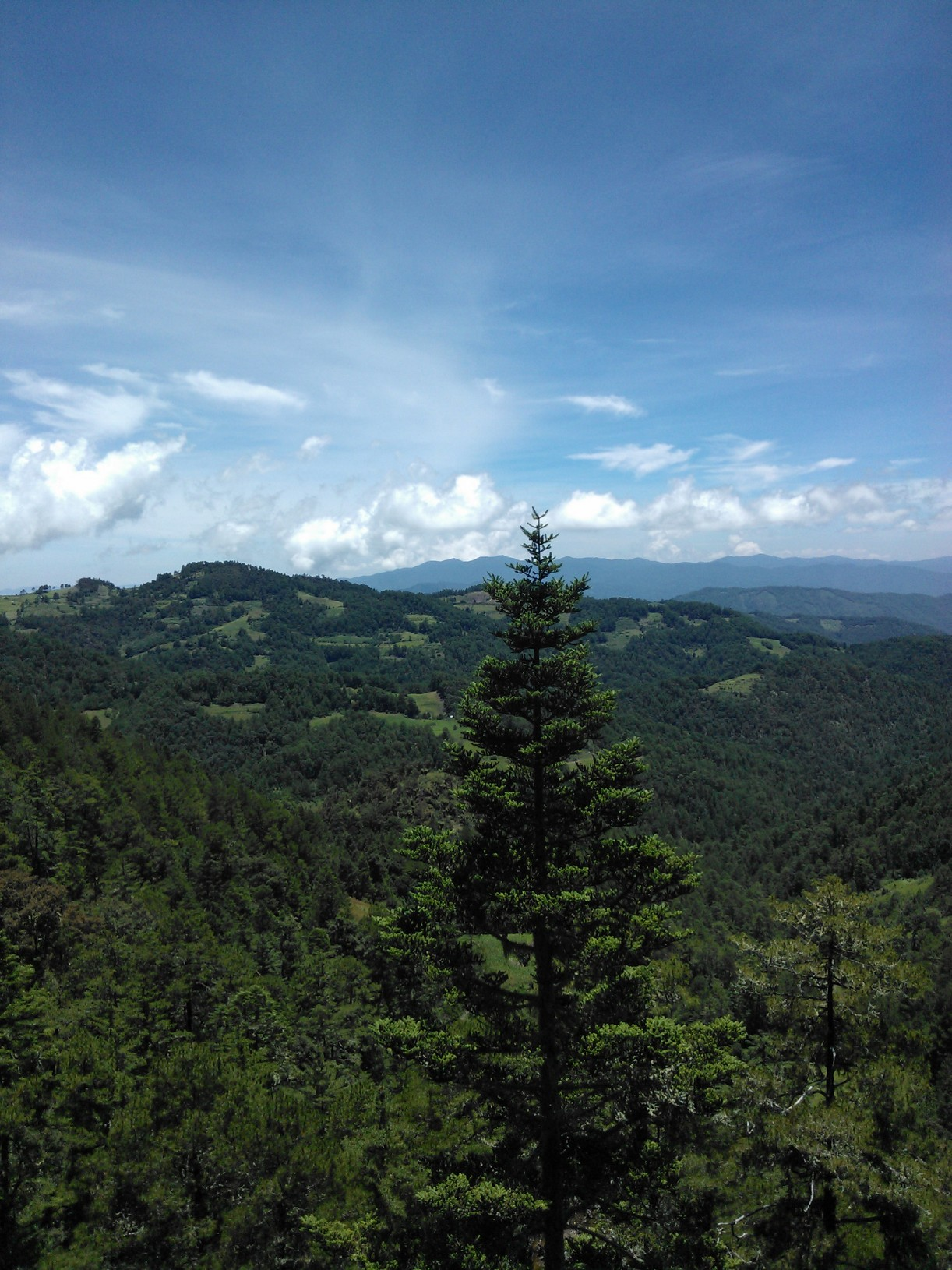
In the Sierra Norte, Oaxaca

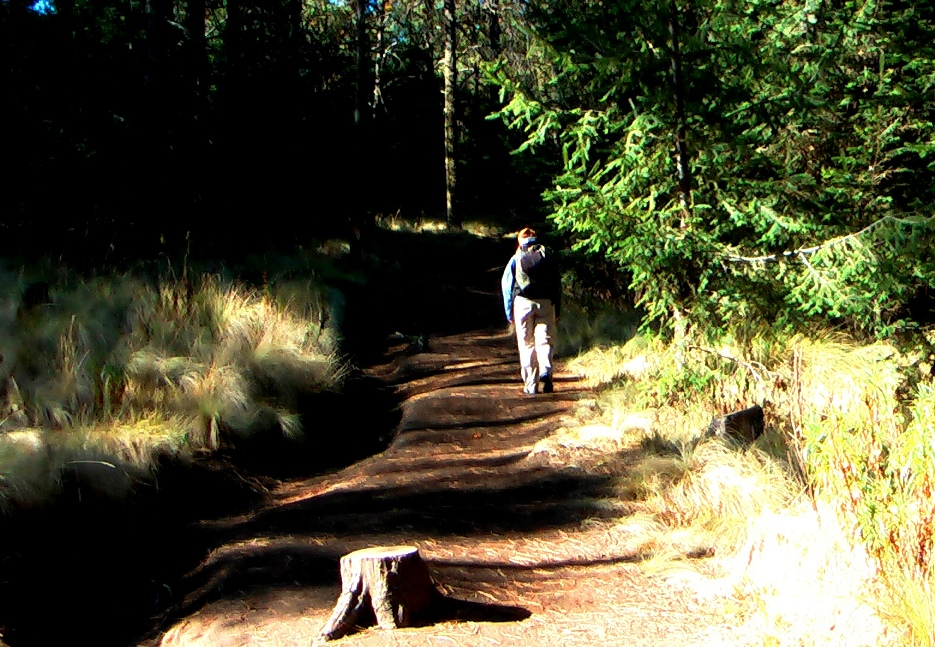
Firs and zacatonal plant community on the trail of La Malinche, Tlaxcala

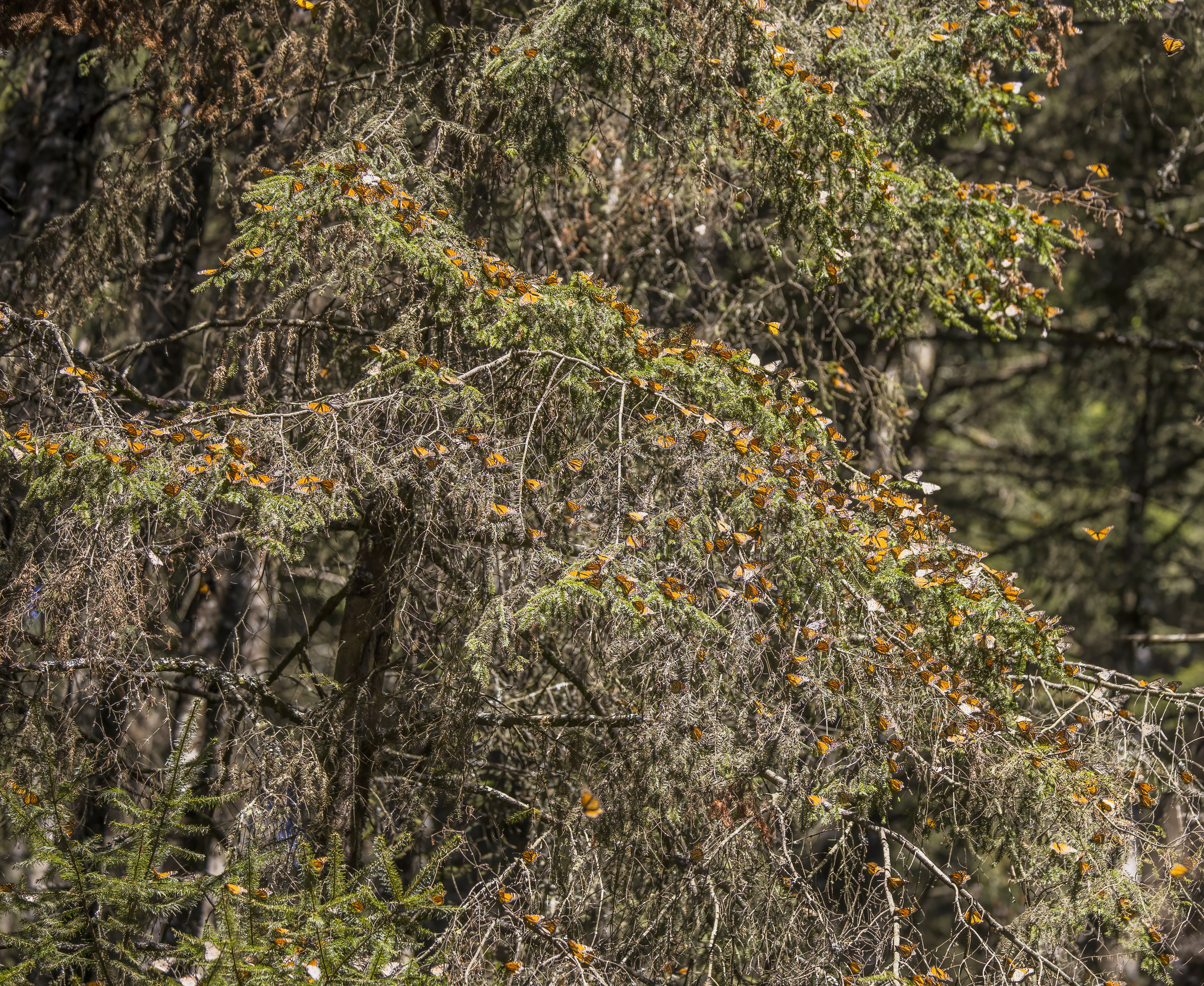
Piedra Herrada butterfly sanctuary, Mexico
