= Ocampo Municipality, Michoacán =

Ocampo
- Municipality
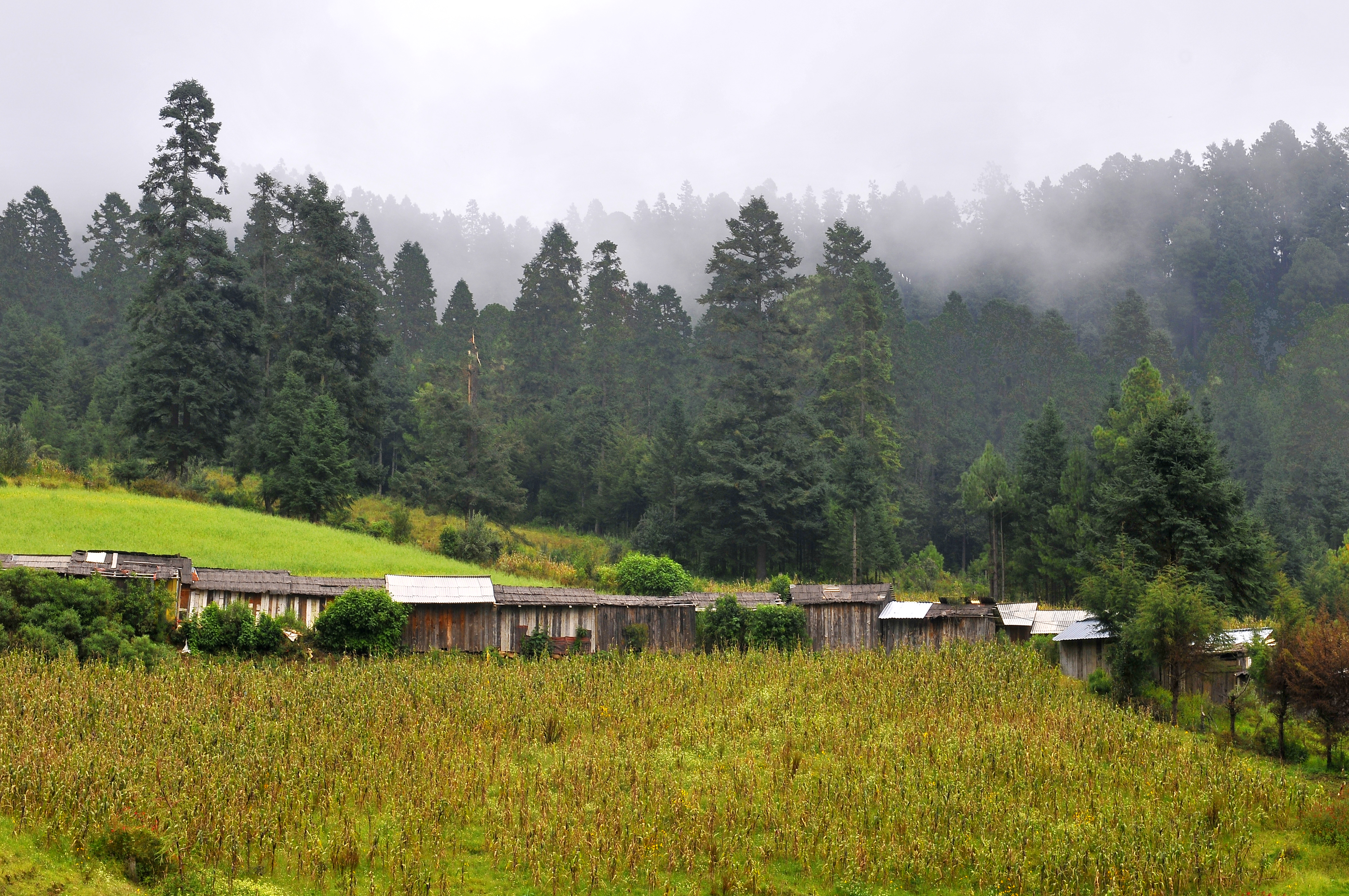

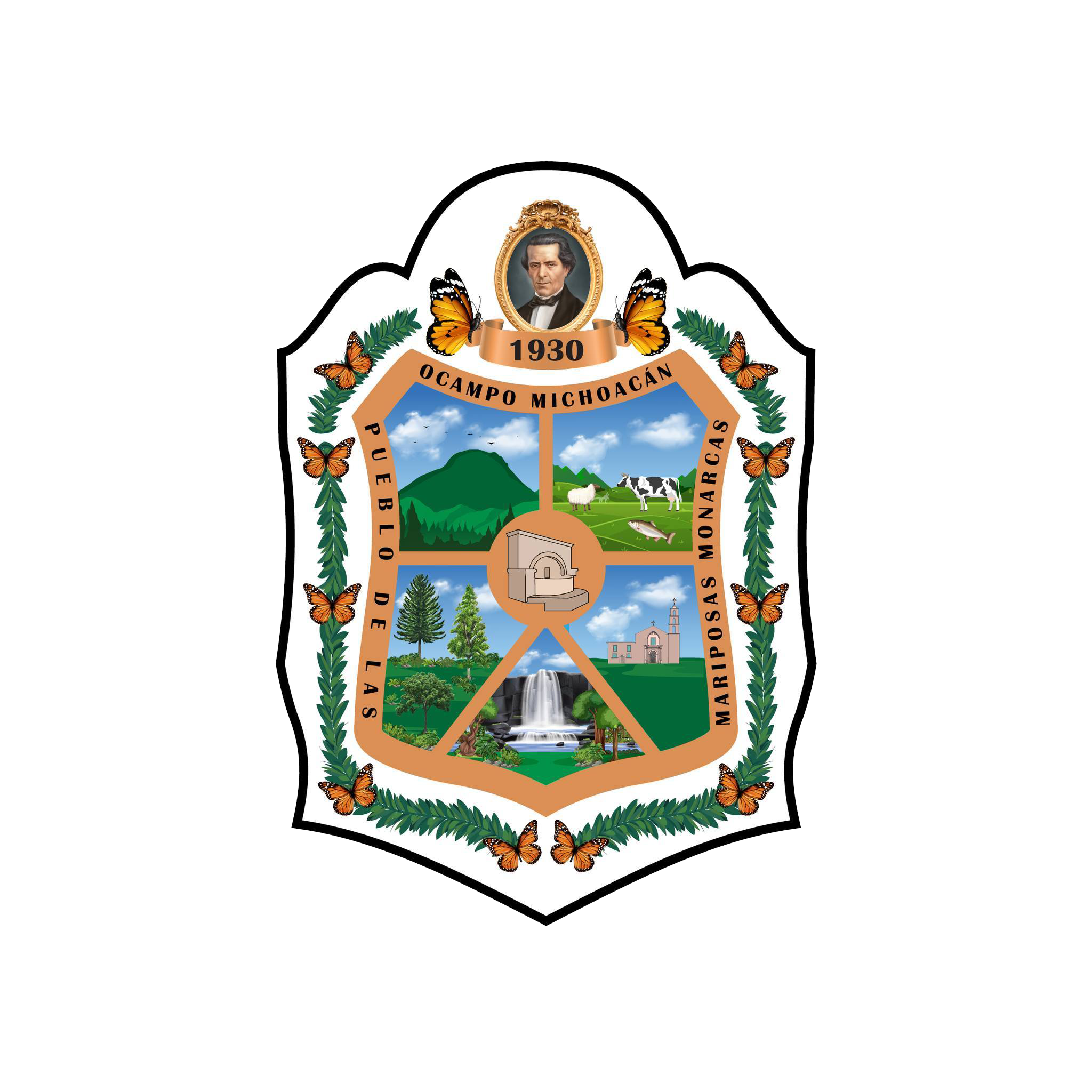
- Coat of arms

- Location in Mexico
- Coordinates: 19°35′04″N 100°20′32″W
- Country: Mexico
- State: Michoacán
- Municipal seat: Ocampo
- Established: 1930

Area
  - Total: 146.883 km^{2} (56.712 sq mi)

Population (2010)
  - Total: 22,628
  - Density: 154.05/km^{2} (399.00/sq mi)

Ocampo is a municipality in the Mexican state of Michoacán. The municipal seat lies at Ocampo.

== Geography ==
=== Towns and villages ===
The municipality has 42 localities. The largest are:

Name	Population (2010)
Ocampo	3,799
Manzana de San Luis	2,996
Ejido el Rosario	1,080
Manzana la Confradía	1,040
Cuartel la Mesa (El Asoleadero)	1,034
Manzana Rancho Escondido	911
Manzana del Centro de San Cristóbal	801
Total Municipality	22,698
