= Carindapaz =

Town in Michoacán, Mexico

Carindapaz is a small town in Senguio, Michoacán, Mexico.

In 1785, Bishop of Morelia Antonio de San Miguel began financing the Morelia Aqueduct's construction to supply drinking water to his stores in Morelia, then Valladolid. It sourced the water from Carindapaz, El Moral, and San Miguel del Monte's springs. It was completed in 1789 at a cost of 100,000 pesos.

As of May 2022, it has been the site of cartel violence between the Jalisco New Generation Cartel and La Familia Michoacana.
