= Ocampo, Michoacán =

Ocampo
- City
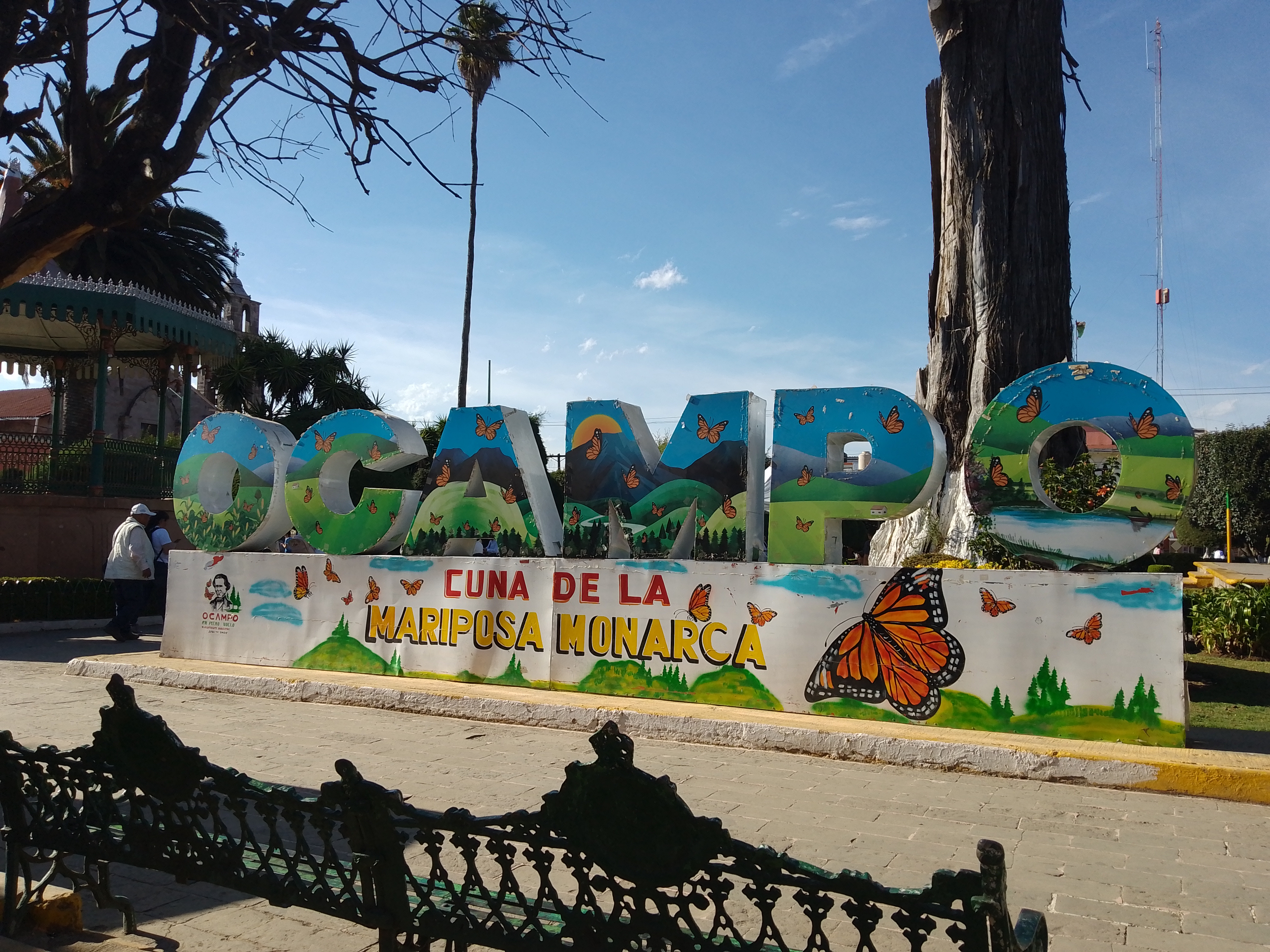

- Location in Mexico
- Coordinates: 19°34′59″N 100°20′20″W
- Country: Mexico
- State: Michoacán
- Municipality: Ocampo

Population (2010)
  - Total: 3,799

Ocampo is a town and seat of the municipality of Ocampo, in the central Mexican state of Michoacán. As of 2010, the town had a population of 3,799.
