= Monarch butterfly migration =

Migrations, mainly across North America

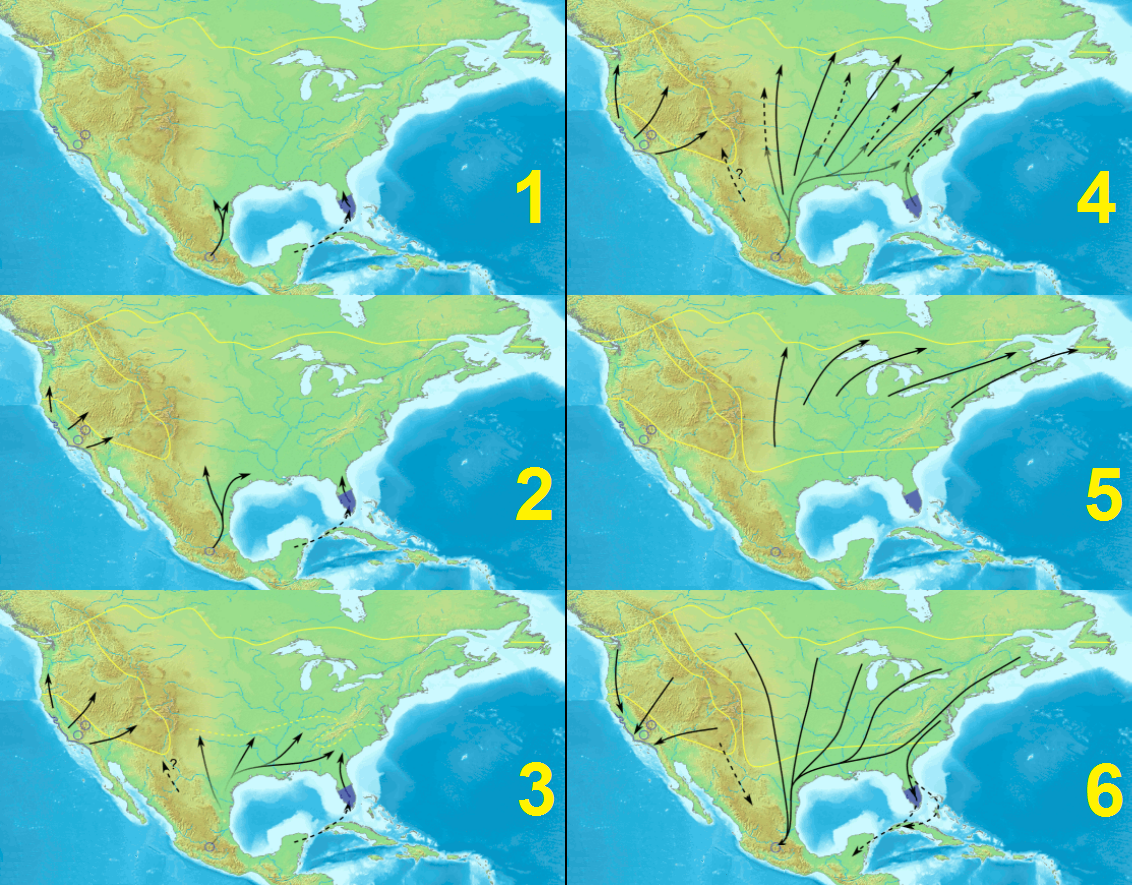
Monarch butterfly migration 1) March; 2) April; 3) End of April; 4) April – June; 5) June – August;6) September – November

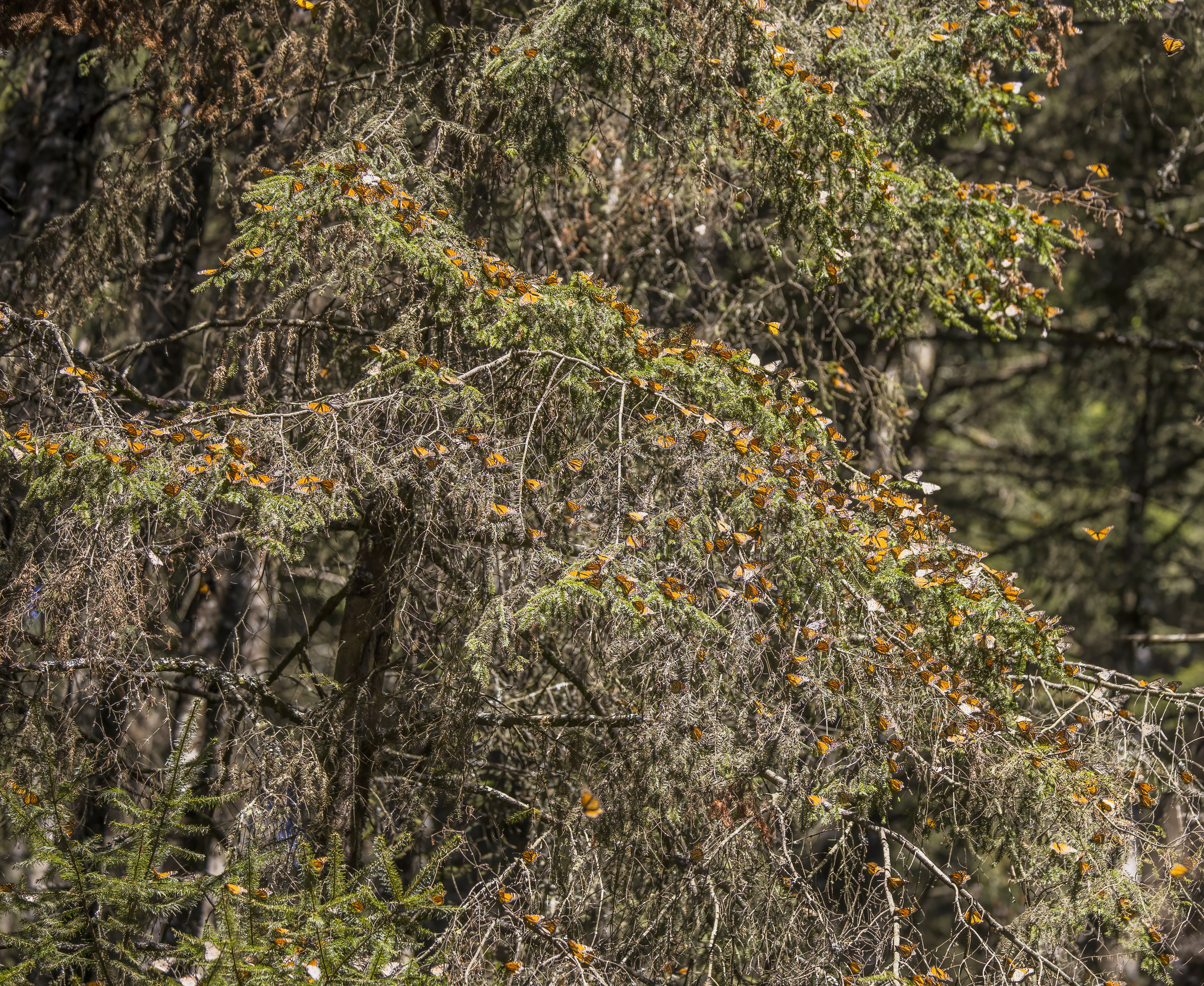
Overwintering on Oyamel fir (Abies religiosa) Piedra Herrada, Mexico

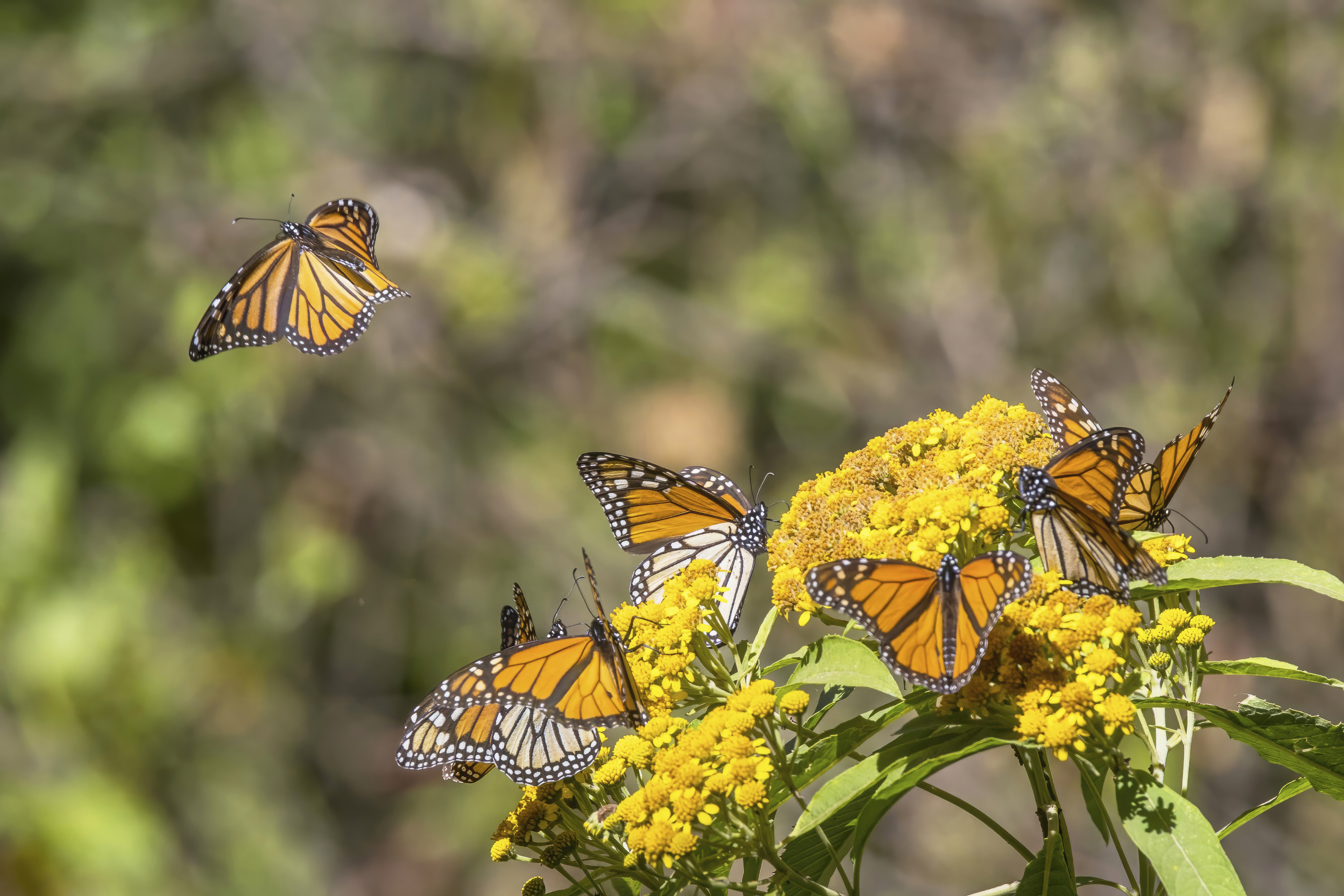
Overwintering Piedra Herrada, Mexico

Monarch butterfly migration is the phenomenon, mainly throughout North America, where the monarch subspecies Danaus plexippus plexippus migrates each autumn to overwintering sites near the west coast of California or mountainous sites in central Mexico. Other populations from around the world perform minor migrations or none at all. This massive movement of butterflies has been recognized as "one of the most spectacular natural phenomena in the world".

The North American monarchs begin their southern migration in September and October. Migratory monarchs originate in southern Canada and the northern United States. They then travel thousands of kilometers to overwintering sites in central Mexico. The butterflies arrive at their roosting sites in November. They remain in roosts atop volcanic mountains on oyamel fir trees (Abies religiosa) during the winter months and then begin their northern migration in March, back to North America and southern Canada.

Two to three generations of monarchs complete the migration north. Female monarchs lay eggs for a subsequent generation during the northward migration. Four generations are involved in the annual cycle. The generation undertaking the southbound migration lives eight times longer than their parents and grandparents due to a regulatory age-inducing hormone. Similarly, the western populations migrate annually from regions west of the Rocky Mountains to overwintering sites near the coast of California.

Not all monarch populations make major migrations. Monarchs migrate short distances in Australia and New Zealand. There are some populations of D. p. plexippus, such as in Florida and the Caribbean, as well as another subspecies (D. p. megalippe) distributed in the Caribbean, Central America and northern South America, that do not migrate. Additional overwintering sites have been identified in Arizona and northern Florida. In encouraging news, the eastern monarch butterfly population nearly doubled in 2025, according to a report announced in Mexico. The population wintering in central Mexico's forests occupied 4.42 acres (1.8 ha), up from 2.22 acres (0.9 ha) during the previous winter. While monarchs occupied nearly twice as much forest habitat as they did during the previous year, populations remained far below the long-term average.

== Historical accounts ==
As late as 1951, monarchs were mistakenly thought to overwinter as adults or pupae. Roosts of thousands were observed in the southern regions of North America.

Migrating western populations of Danaus plexippus and their overwintering sites were known long before the Mexican winter sites were discovered by scientists in 1975. Pre-Hispanic Native Americans, the Purépecha and Otomi once occupied this area and tied the harvest of corn to the arrival of the butterflies. Monarchs appear in legends of the people that live near overwintering areas. In the areas surrounding the overwintering sites in Mexico, local residents were quite aware of the overwintering behavior of monarch butterflies long before 1975. The local people, called the Mazahua, have lived near the overwintering sites for centuries. The arrival of the monarch butterflies is closely tied to the traditional Dia de los Muertos celebrations. Local residents today easily recall seeing the migrating butterflies prior to 1975.

For at least a century, monarchs were observed overwintering in California. Historical records kept by lepidopterists do not mention the presence of monarchs in their current western range extending northward through Washington, Oregon and Canada. Female Monarchs lay their eggs exclusively on milkweeds, which provide the caterpillars and later adults with protection from predators, and it is speculated that milkweed may not have been available until western lands were cultivated, resulting in the expansion of the butterfly.

More formal migration studies began when Fred Urquhart graduated from the University of Toronto in 1935 and accepted a graduate fellowship in the field of entomology. In 1937, Urquhart began to plot the route taken by the migrating butterflies. He was the first to record that monarchs move in a south to southwest direction during the North American fall and that these movements were correlated to high pressure systems. He began the first successful tagging program which returned data. He and his volunteers recognized the existence of roosting behavior.

Fred Urquhart advertised for 'interested persons' in the Mexican press to assist him in locating the roosting sites. Catalina Trail and Kenneth C. Brugger responded and in January 1975 they led him to one of the major overwintering sites. Urquhart, William Calvert, John Christian, and Lincoln P. Brower collaborated to publish the details of this discovery in 1976. There was some concern at the time that public knowledge would endanger the butterflies.

Since 1976, 12 roosting sites have been identified to the northwest and west of Mexico City in the Mexican states of Michoacán and México. At least 70% of the monarchs were typically concentrated in only three of those sites. At least twenty colonies existed in Mexico during 1997.

As of 2023, one of the larger known overwintering sites was in the Joya Redonda Monarch Butterfly Sanctuary, located 50 miles (80 km) southeast of Mexico City, in the foothills of the volcanoes Popocatépetl and Ixtaccíhuatl in the state of México's municipality of Atlautla. Clusters of monarchs roost in the sanctuary's oyamel fir trees each winter. Although area residents had earlier seen small numbers of monarchs, more butterflies began to establish colonies in Atlautla during the early 2000s as deforestation to the northwest destroyed old hibernation grounds. Assisted by local volunteers, the Joya Redonda's colonies increased tenfold in one year. During the 2021–2022 season, only four colonized trees existed; during the following season, there were 42. At the time, tourists were charged 100 pesos (around U.S. $5.50) for access to the sanctuary.

== Migrations ==
=== Southward ===
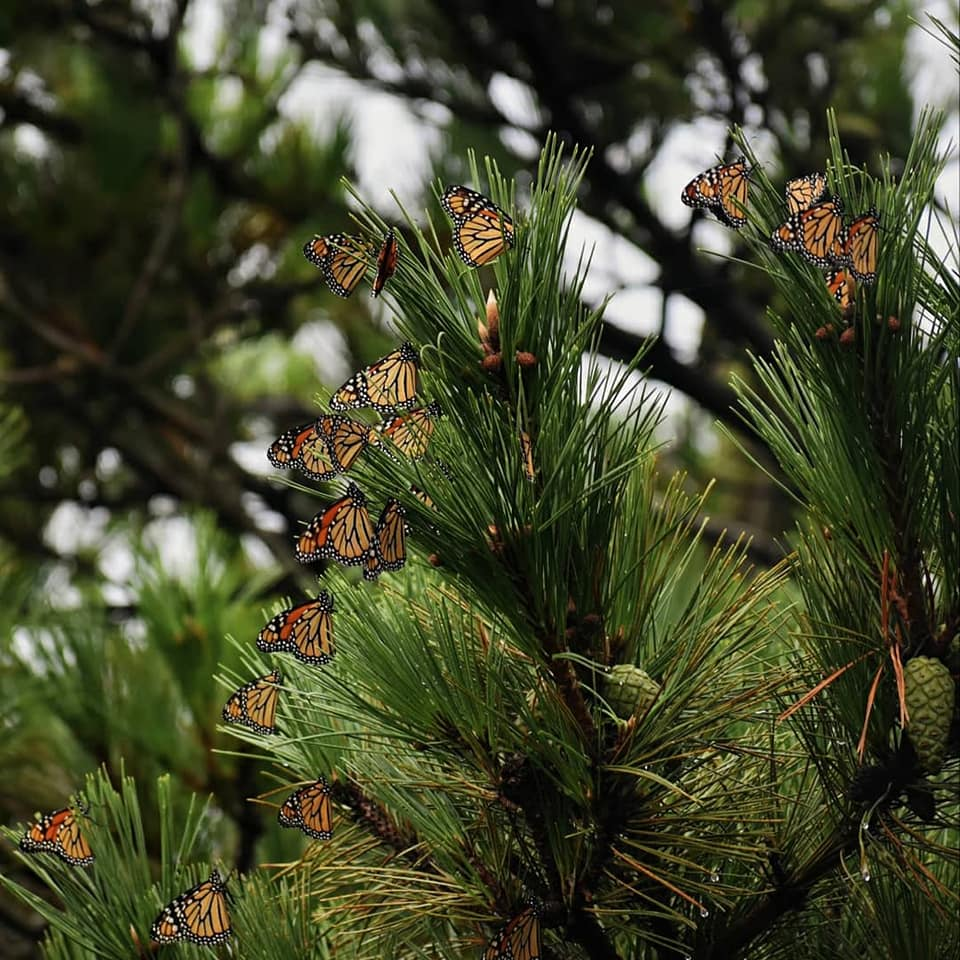
Southward migrating monarchs resting on a pine tree in Fire Island National Seashore on Long Island, New York (September 2021)

Although the exact dates change each year, by the end of October, the population of monarchs east of the Rocky Mountains migrates to the sanctuaries of the Mariposa Monarca Biosphere Reserve within the Trans-Mexican Volcanic Belt pine-oak forests in the Mexican states of Michoacán and México. They also overwinter in areas that are privately owned. Some monarchs migrate to other locations such as Cuba and Florida in the fall.

Two migratory flyways exist through North America. One in the Central states leads to the Mexican overwintering areas and a smaller flyway along the eastern North American seaboard. The timing of the eastern flyway lags behind the more central flyway. Monarchs migrating along the coast are less likely of being recovered in Mexico. This suggests that butterflies migrating along the eastern seaboard are migrating to locations other than Mexico, or they have a higher rate of mortality than those migrating inland.

Monarch butterflies are thought to respond to different cues that promote the fall season southern migration. These include the angle of light coming from the sun, the senescence of larval host milkweed plants, the decreasing day period and temperature drop. The migration begins at the northernmost summer range approximately in August. Migrating monarchs are thought to rely heavily on the nectar of fall flower composites that lie along the migration path.

Generally speaking, the eastern monarch population migrates from southern Canada and the midwestern United States, almost directly south towards Mexico. Monarchs from the Northeast tend to migrate in a southwest direction, and those transplanted from the Midwest to the East Coast migrated directly south but then reoriented their path to the southwest in one study. Geographical features affect the migration route.

In general, the North American western population of monarchs migrates from land west of the Rocky Mountains, including northern Canada to California. Australian monarchs that migrate travel from the west to eastern regions closer to the Pacific.

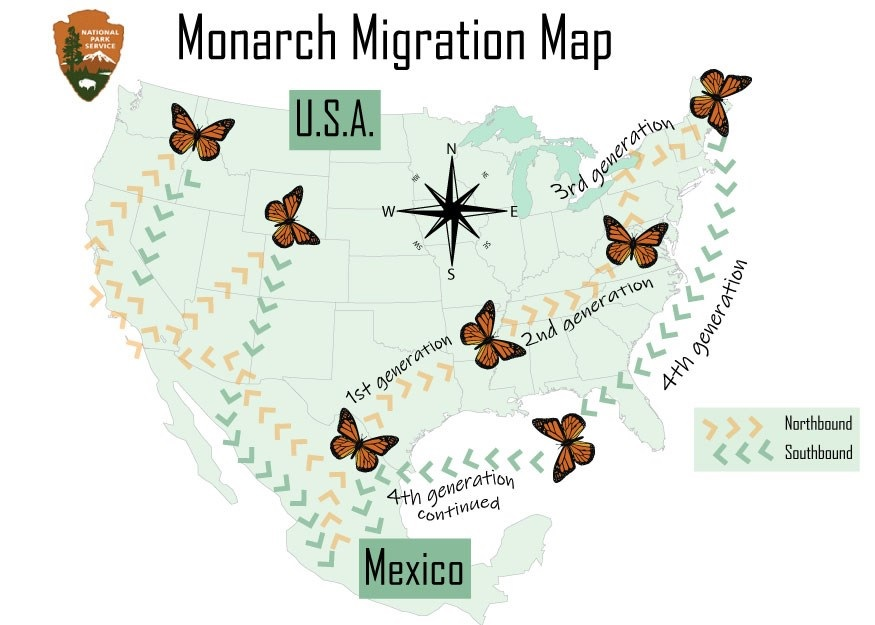
Migration Map

==== Monarch diapause ====
In most individual adult butterflies, diapause begins with its southern migration, but unlike other insects in this state, it remains active. When diapause is initiated the butterflies accumulate and store lipids, proteins and carbohydrates. Monarchs migrating to Mexico accumulate more lipids than those migrating to California. Fats and lipids reduce water to provide energy reserves and prevent desiccation. These substances are used to maintain the insect throughout diapause and to provide fuel for development following diapause termination. It occurs genetically well in advance of environmental stress. In diapause, high-metabolic activities are reduced, resulting in reduced oxygen consumption.

Monarchs in diapause of the fall migrating population are physiologically distinct from those in active reproduction behavior in the spring and summer. In diapause, fats and lipids levels can be as high as 34%. The fat storage organ is substantially larger in migrating and overwintering monarchs compared to the summer generations. Samples of tissue excluding the fat body also show higher levels of free lipids in the hemolymph. Females in diapause show little evidence of mature eggs. Mating is repressed and only occasionally observed among overwintering monarchs. This is thought to increase the survivability of winter populations and maintain fat reserves that will promote spring northward migration. At one site, the population stayed in diapause until the middle to the end of January. By the beginning of February the day length increases to just over 11 hours, the point at which monarchs come out of diapause.

Diapause has distinct phases. Decreasing day period and dropping temperatures inhibit the production of juvenile hormone. This represses the development of gonadal activity, mating behaviors, and egg-laying. New behaviors emerge such as the development of social nectaring groups and late afternoon formation of night-time clusters or roosts. Roosting reduces water loss, probably due to decreased surface-area-to-volume ratios reducing evaporative water loss.

=== Northward ===
There is a northward migration in the spring. Female monarchs lay eggs for the next generation during these migrations. Northward migration from Florida normally occurs from mid-March to mid-May and the initial wave of the migration may be the offspring of monarchs that have overwintered in Florida and along the northern Gulf Coast, not in central Mexico. Tagged monarchs from Tallahassee were recovered in Virginia and Georgia.

The distance and length of these journeys exceeds the normal lifespan of monarchs, which is less than two months for butterflies born in early summer. The first generation leaving the overwintering sites only migrates as far north as Texas and Oklahoma. The second, third and fourth generations return to their northern breeding locations in the United States and Canada in the spring.

As with the initiation of the southern migration, a variety of cues trigger the cessation of diapause, the beginning of breeding activity and the movement north. In the case of the western population, the dispersal proceeds in a westerly and northwesterly direction. During this process, roosting sites sometimes move and the monarchs move to lower elevations. Rising temperatures and increasing daylengths influence the initiation of the northward migration. Mated females leave the overwintering sites before the males. Monarchs travelling north do not form roosts.

Rates of recolonization have remained steady between 1997 and 2011. The recolonization of the breeding grounds in the United States and Canada is a two to three generation process. The pattern of recolonization of the northern breeding areas has not changed since monitoring began in 1997.

=== Roosting and overwintering sites ===
During the migration, the eastern and western populations tend to group together during the migration and then at the overwintering sites. These roosts form along the migration routes, and scientists have used these roost locations to map out the flyways. Fred Urquhart observed roosting behavior in south-migrating butterflies in Mexico and Michoacan. He documented 1500 monarchs roosting at Lighthouse Point, Florida. In California, monarchs have been observed roosting in a wide variety of locations: Fremont, Natural Bridges State Beach, golf courses, suburban areas. California roosts differ from those in Mexico. Roosts are observed in inland areas and on non-native tree species.

Overwintering sites in California, Northwestern Mexico, Arizona, the Gulf Coast, central Mexico and Florida share the same habitat characteristics: moderating climatic conditions (thermally stable and frost-free), relatively high humidity, access to drinking water and availability of trees on which to roost and avoid predation. California has more than 200 overwintering sites. Overwintering sites have also been observed in coastal South Carolina along with ovipositing females. On the US East Coast, they have overwintered as far north as Virginia Beach, Virginia.

California overwintering sites exist in areas that are developed and are not considered especially forest-like. These sites have been described as having a uniform vegetation population of either Monterey pine or eucalyptus trees and are often present in urban areas. Overwintering sites are dynamic in that tagged butterflies have been observed to move between different roosts through the winter. Monarchs overwintering along the Gulf Coast and in Florida do not enter diapause and breed year-round.

=== Range and characteristics of migrating butterflies ===
The western population of migrating monarchs overwinters in coastal sites in central and southern California, United States, notably in Pacific Grove, Santa Cruz, and Grover Beach. Western monarchs also overwinter in Baja, California's central valley, and the Sierra Nevada foothills.

Not all monarchs migrate. Migrating populations and non-migrating populations coexist in many areas. Monarchs are year-round residents in Florida and monarchs migrate to Florida and Gulf coast areas, and can often continue to breed and survive the winter. The monarch population in Florida may be a result from migratory butterflies that do not migrate north in the spring. These locations provide access to nectar plants. If there is a hard frost in these areas they do not survive. Asclepias curassavica, an introduced annual ornamental, provides larval food if native species are unavailable, although because of the risks to monarchs from the spread of the ophryocystis elektroscirrha parasite (OE), there is controversy about whether this plant should be planted. Year-round breeding of resident monarch populations exist in the Caribbean, and in Mexico as far south as the Yucatán peninsula. Surprisingly, monarchs do not migrate over most of their global range. Tagging records demonstrate that the eastern and western populations are not entirely separate. Arizona butterflies have been captured at overwintering sites in both California and Michoacan, Mexico. In some instances monarchs from Arizona and New Mexico were found overwintering in California and in Mexico.

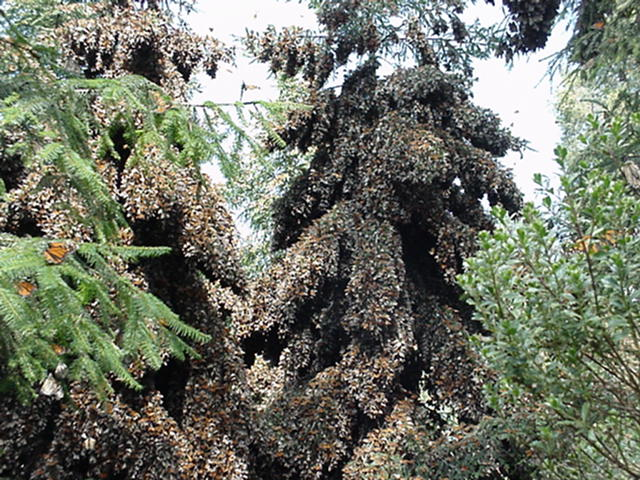
Overwintering monarchs cluster on oyamel trees in a preserve outside of Angangueo, Michoacan, Mexico; one tree is completely covered in butterflies.

Fall-migrating monarchs are not the same ones that migrated northward approximately five months before. Instead, the northern-migrating butterflies are at least four generations removed from overwintering sites. The eastern population migrates up to 3,000 miles (4,830 km) to overwintering sites in Mexico.

Other insects migrate for longer distances than monarchs. For example, radar records have shown that up to six successive generations of painted lady butterflies (Vanessa cardui) complete a 9,000 miles (14,484 km) round trip from tropical Africa to the Arctic Circle — which is one and a half times the maximum eastern monarch round-trip migration of 6,000 miles (9,656 km). In 2013, a flock of painted lady butterflies crossed the Atlantic Ocean from Africa to French Guiana in South America in a non-stop journey of at least 2,600 miles (4,200 km) aided by easterly trade winds. In 1950, individual swarms of the desert locust (Schistocerca gregaria) were seen migrating from the Arabian peninsula for over 5,000 kilometres (3,107 mi) to the west coast of Africa in seven weeks.

Migrating monarchs tend to have darker orange and larger wings than they do during the breeding phase in the summer. The darkness of the orange color in monarch wings appears to be a visual indicator of their migratory ability. The monarchs migrating south are larger in size and weight. Two studies have used stable isotopes to infer natal origins of migrating monarchs captured at their wintering sites (eastern and western), and both showed that monarchs migrating longer distances tended to be larger. Wing size differs between early and late migrants. Earlier migrants tend to be more robust, healthier individuals, while late-migrating monarchs represent the ones that fell behind, presumably because they are less well-suited for migration. Early-migrating monarchs tended to be redder, have larger, and more elongated wings, and larger bodies, than those at the tail end of the migration.

=== Sex ratios ===
An unusual pattern has been observed in the sex ratios of monarchs in the eastern North American population, both during the fall migration and at the overwintering sites in Mexico. Normally during the breeding season, the ratio of males and females is roughly the same, but during the migration the ratio is skewed toward males. This persists during the overwintering period as well, likely because it's the same cohort that advances from migration to the overwintering sites. Scientists have examined records from the overwintering period over 30 years, and found that the skewed sex ratio has grown more pronounced in recent years, perhaps because of a loss of females. The ratio appears to be even more evident in observations of roosting or migrating monarchs, where fewer than 30% of the monarchs are females.

== Population and migratory study methods ==
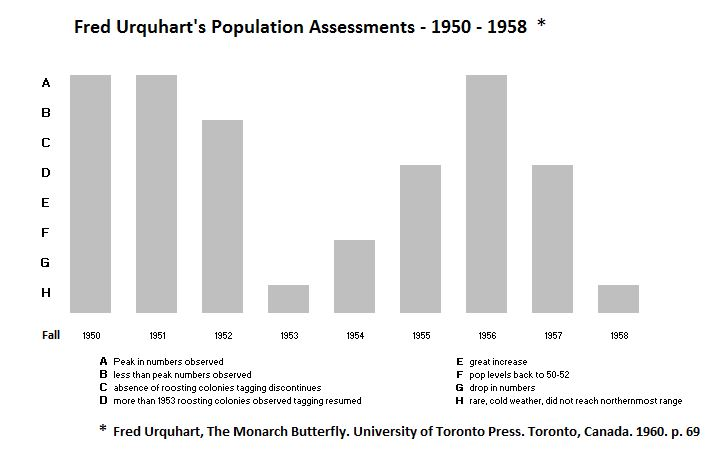
Populations such as these recorded by Fred Urquhart for 1950–1958 varied "dramatically".

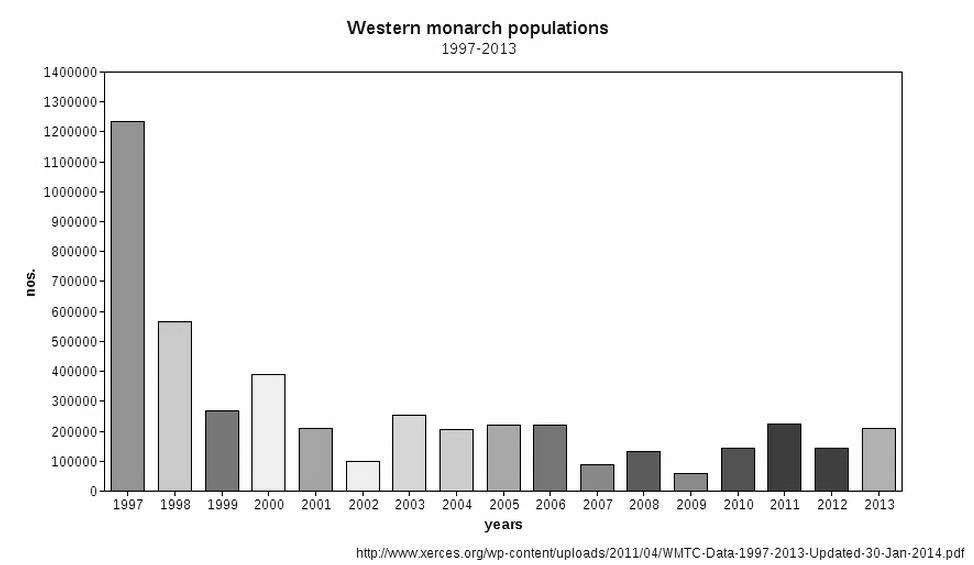
Western monarch populations 1997–2013 from Xerces data

Initially, direct observation was the primary method used to assess monarch migration. More sophisticated methods have been developed since 1975. Population counts vary "dramatically" year to year.

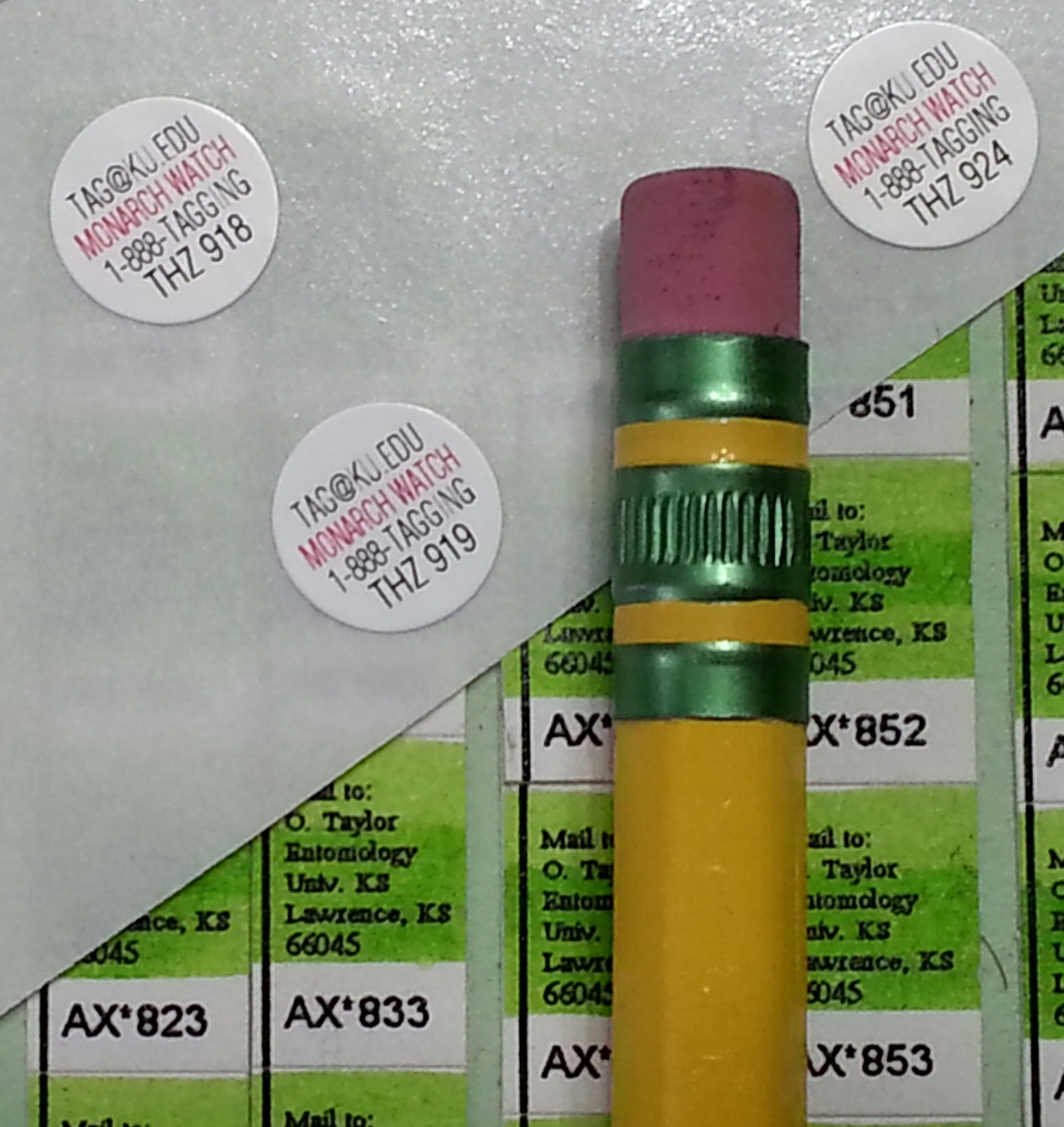
Tags for wings of monarch butterflies to study migration. Circular tags are presently used (2014), green tags were used by Monarch Watch – the University of Kansas

The World Wildlife Fund and its partners have measured the area of Mexican forest in which monarch butterflies hibernate each winter during the last two weeks of December since 1993. They recorded the largest occupied area in 1996 and the smallest in 2013. The area was 35% greater in 2021 than in 2020. The area decreased by 22% in 2022 from the previous year and decreased by 59% in 2023 from 2022. Although the number increased by 92% in December 2024 from the previous December, it did not reach the number recorded two years earlier. The area recorded in 2024 was 10% of that recorded in 1996 and 29% of that when recording began in 1993.

The cause of the variations are attributed to natural occurrences, different methods used to count migrating butterflies, and man-made changes to the habitat. The validity of the population census at overwintering sites in North America is questioned. The discrepancy between migrating populations and populations present at the overwintering sites suggests a significant adult mortality during the migration. The Commission for Environmental Cooperation has determined that population variations require a long-term and large scale monitoring effort Population estimates of adults, or of eggs and larva, and milkweed abundance, should correlate with the censuses at the overwintering sites. Data are currently unavailable at this time to determine these censuses but a current study by The Monarch Larva Monitoring Project is designed to determine whether or not population censuses in Mexico match the population censuses in the Midwestern United States and Canada.

=== Tagging ===
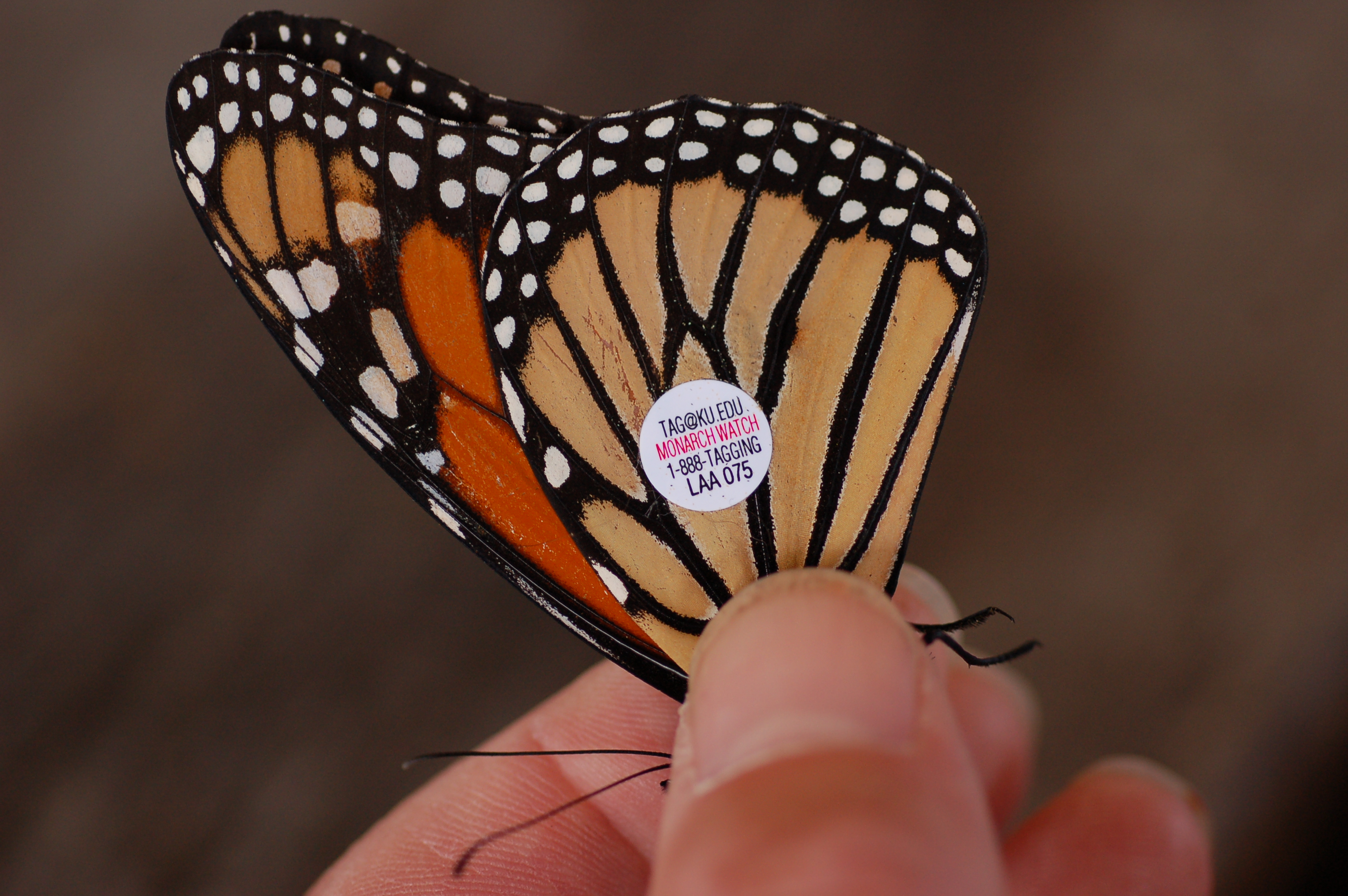
Monarch male tagged with an identification sticker

Though the tagging of Lepidoptera was done as early as 1796 on silk moths, Fred Urquart initiated monarch butterfly tagging and used wing incisions, spots arrangements, colored spots, spraying with dyes, painted letters and numbers to mark the butterflies. These methods were unsuccessful as there were no instructions to return the butterfly or record the recovery. Currently, many organizations study migration by tagging. New methods of studying the migration include the use of VHF transmitters and commercial aircraft. Isotopic tagging has also been employed.

=== Mark and recapture ===
Tagging and recapture allows the determination of the total population of monarchs. The recaptured monarchs are directly proportional to the number in the whole population. This procedure allows an estimate of the total population size by dividing the number of marked individuals by the proportion of marked individuals in the second sample. Other closely related methods, include capture-recapture, capture-mark-recapture, mark-recapture, sight-resight, mark-release-recapture, multiple systems estimation, band recovery, the Petersen method and the Lincoln method. The northern migration from Florida and the disbursement of roosts in California have been studied using these methods.

=== Butterfly counts ===
The migration of the Monarch butterfly is documented and studied during annual butterfly counts. During the southward migration, concentrations of migrating monarchs are consistently monitored by the Cape May Bird Observatory, Peninsula Point Light, Michigan, and Point Pelee National Park, Ontario, Canada. Counts are also common throughout Quebec. Other protocols used to conduct the censuses include Driving Census, Walking Census, Roosting Counts, and Hawk-watch Observations. Migrating monarchs tend to congregate and form roosts on peninsulas that point south. Monitoring programs count the number of monarchs in roosts that develop along the migration route. Monitoring data from multiple sites correlate. The ratio of monarchs to other species observed during a count provides information about habitat changes. Yearly fluctuations are attributed to severe weather effects, El Nino Southern Oscillation and volcanic eruption.

=== Observers ===
Most of those who participate in the study of Monarch migration are laypersons (trained and untrained) and are sometimes referred to as 'citizen scientists'. Anecdotal information by observers has been criticized and called not "good science" and "not science at all". Conservation organizations and scientists use observations in their research. Those who participate in organized butterfly counts also provide valid observations. Some regions in Texas are located in the flight path during the migration and the patterns, distributions, and populations are recorded by observers there.

=== Aerial and satellite observations ===
Satellite imagery has been used to assess changes in and around the Mexican overwintering areas. Researchers have determined that an accurate count of the butterflies using satellite images is not possible, though aerial assessments of the areas surrounding the colonies reveals potential areas of colonization. After these efforts, the costs out-weighed the benefits of high-altitude aerial photography and it was determined to be time-consuming and expensive.

=== Types of data collected ===
Direct observation usually means that an observer records data while the butterfly is one stage of its migration. These data can include:

- historical accounts
- flight vectors
- densities
- appearance in the northern breeding range
- appearance in overwintering sites
- location of overwintering sites
- wing condition
- sex
- size
- roosts
- butterfly counts (butterfly sightings/minute)
- emergence of host plants
- local frosts
- estimations of populations and densities
- wind direction
- cloud cover
- parasite loads
- latitude/longitude

=== Use of data and availability ===
Data has significantly accumulated over the years and is used by researchers. Scientific observations are sometimes treated like proprietary information and are not available to the public or other researchers. Observers have begun to record their sightings via Google maps.

=== Project Monarch ===
In 2025, Project Monarch deployed over 400 solar-powered ultralight transmitters on the thoraxes of that year's southward-migrating monarchs, tracking butterflies from locations throughout North America and the Caribbean to their overwintering sites in Mexico.

== Migratory theory mechanisms ==
There are many theories that attempt to explain monarch migration. "Science has not yet offered a sufficient explanation for how that [the migration] happens." Researchers often propose that multiple migratory mechanisms play a role. Not all who study monarch migration agree on the mechanisms that allow the migrating butterflies to find overwintering sites.

=== Navigational mechanisms ===
==== Time-compensated sun compass ====
The sun plays an integral role in the monarchs' migratory patterns: monarchs travel during the day and use a circadian clock based on the position of the sun in the sky as a compass to orient themselves in the proper migratory direction. Because the position of the sun changes over the course of the day, to maintain a proper flight bearing regardless of time of day at which they travel, monarchs use a circadian clock to compensate for the changes of the position of the sun in the sky; they use what is known as a time-compensated sun compass. Various studies have shown this behavior both in natural systems and laboratory settings, yet there remains much to be researched about the underlying mechanisms for interpreting the orientation and timing cues that lead to the migratory patterns of the monarchs. Even with a time-compensated sun compass, it remains unclear with this model alone how monarchs effectively navigate to a single shared migratory location from variable starting locations.

==== Magnetic compass navigation ====
In addition to a sun compass monarchs use a magnetic compass to guide their southern migration.

==== Experimental evidence ====
When monarchs entrained to laboratory light-dark cycles were placed in flight simulators, or recording containers in which tethered butterflies are allowed to freely fly in the horizontal plane in all directions, migratory monarchs could integrate current sunlight conditions with their internal time of day to determine and consistently show a southward preferred direction of travel. However, when these monarchs were placed into flight simulators with six hour clock advances or delays, preferred direction of travel changed due to interference with the time-compensated sun compass. Monarchs orient to the sun based on their internal time of day, so drastic changes to the position of the sun at the same perceived time results in disrupted navigation. In such an instance, monarchs can no longer accurately identify southward travel, and, depending on the light conditions, may begin to migrate in other directions.

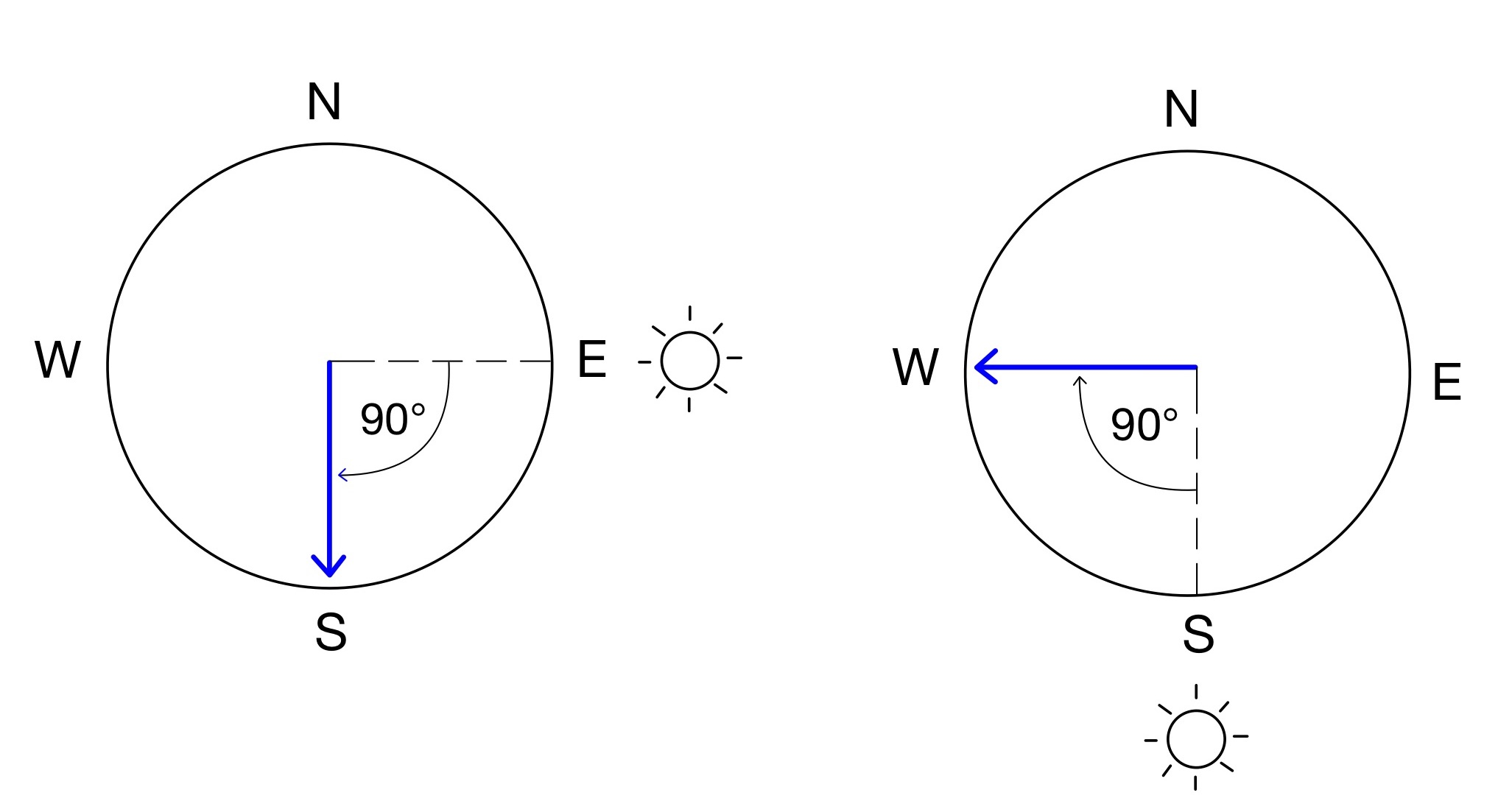
Left: A monarch entrained to a local light-dark cycle can fly south based on a learned orientation angle to the sun.Right: When this monarch is relocated across time zones or light cycles, it still retains its original internal time of day. It attempts to integrate this information with the sun's position to determine compass directions. However, in a new location, the sun might occupy a different position in the sky at the same time of day, and this shift in timing misdirects the butterfly. The monarch's learned orientation angle to the sun now directs it to fly west, so the monarch exhibits a new, incorrect preferred flight direction.

==== Molecular basis of circadian navigation ====
The importance of the circadian clock in the function of this time-compensated sun compass system has led to investigating the molecular basis of the clock mechanism in monarchs, resulting in a well-defined model of both central and peripheral clocks. Similarly to how circadian clocks operate in Drosophila and mammals, the monarch circadian clock uses a transcription translation feedback loop (TTFL) to drive rhythms in the mRNA and protein levels of its core circadian clock components. However, the monarch mechanism has been found to be ancestral because it diverges from other clock mechanisms in the functions of its elements, some which reflect that of a Drosophila clock and some which reflect that of a mammalian clock. The most unique aspect of the monarch clock mechanism is that it involves two cryptochrome (CRY) proteins – CRY1 and CRY2 – with differing functions. CRY1 functions similarly to the CRY protein in Drosophila as a blue light photoreceptor that allows for the circadian clock to entrain to a light-dark cycle. CRY2 functions similarly to the mammalian CRY1 and CRY2 proteins in that it functions as one of the major repressors in the monarch TTFL.

In the core loop of the monarch clock mechanism, the proteins CLOCK (CLK) and BMAL1 function as heterodimeric transcription factors that drive transcription of the period (per), timeless (tim), and cry2 genes. When translated, the PER, TIM, and CRY2 proteins form complexes in the cytoplasm and, after a delay, translocate back into the nucleus, allowing CRY2 to repress transcription. After a certain amount of time passes, the PER, TIM, and CRY2 protein complex will degrade and no longer repress CLK and BMAL1, causing the TTFL to restart. Alternatively, blue light photoreception in the CRY1 protein can induces degradation in the TIM protein, which restarts the TTFL, and is how CRY1 in the monarch circadian clock gives rise to the ability to entrain to the Earth's 24 hour day cycle.

In addition to the core feedback loop, a second modulatory feedback loop has also been identified in monarchs. This feedback loop is much like the Drosophila second feedback loop and includes genes that encode orthologs of VRILLE and PDP1, which are known to regulate CLK transcription in Drosophila.

==== Polarized light detection ====
Polarized light is first perceived by the monarch's compound eyes. This polarization, which is used by various insects for navigation, is then detected by the dorsal rim area, a specialized feature of the compound eye. These cues are then passed on to the central complex of the brain, where they are interpreted. Here, single neurons combine the azimuthal location of the sun and the E-vector angle (angle of polarized skylight). This information is then processed and further combined with other locational and orientational cues, as well as input from the monarch's circadian clock, in order to produce the oriented flight that is necessary for migratory behavior. Further research is needed in order to model the neuronal network and fully understand how spatial cues are modeled and integrated in the brain.

==== Antennal circadian clock ====
While neural processing occurs in the monarch's brain, research indicates that the actual circadian clock underlying the migratory patterns is located in the butterfly's antennae. Butterflies with their antennae removed showed no consistent group orientation in their migratory patterns: first exposed to a consistent light-dark cycle prior to release, antennae-less monarchs would show consistent individual directional flight, but no clear cardinal directionality as a group, unlike intact monarchs. Examination of various genes and proteins involved in circadian rhythms showed that the antennae exhibited their own circadian fluctuations, even when removed from the butterfly and studied in vitro, demonstrating that the antennae are sufficient for the generation of circadian rhythms. Further investigation into the role of the antennae has shown that even one functioning antenna is sufficient for correct orientation during migratory flight. However, two antennae with conflicting inputs to their respective circadian clocks will lead to incorrect orientation. Overall, the study of antennae-less Monarchs as well as the in vitro analysis of the antennae indicate that the antennae are both necessary for the proper functioning of the time-compensated sun compass and contain their own circadian clocks that function even without the butterfly's brain.

==== Bi-directionality of sun compass ====
Monarchs are known to use their time-compensated sun compass during both the southern migration in the fall and the northern remigration in the spring. The change in directionality necessary to re-orient the monarchs has been shown to depend on the cold temperatures that the monarchs experience while overwintering in the coniferous forests of Mexico. The change in sun compass direction does not depend on the change in photoperiod experienced during the winter months, but this change is likely to affect the timing of the northern remigration in the spring.

An experiment demonstrating the importance of cold exposure for remigration utilized fall monarchs with and without cold temperature exposure in the laboratory. The monarchs that experienced cold temperatures during the winter months successfully changed the direction of their sun compass and oriented north in the spring. In contrast, the monarchs that never experiences the cold temperatures during the winter months oriented south in the spring, and thus did not experience a change in sun compass direction to accompany their migration. Therefore, the cold exposure experienced while overwintering is required for the monarch's migration cycle.

During the northern remigration of monarchs in the spring, the time-compensated sun compass uses the same substrates as used in the fall. However, the mechanistic differences in these substrates that allows for a switch in the directionality of the compass is still unknown. RNA-sequencing differences found between the fall and spring butterflies is one avenue of research that could locate the mechanism responsible for the recalibration, which may utilize a temperature sensor to start the switch.

=== Landscape theory ===
Migration theories take into account the terrain monarchs encounter during their migration. Mountains, rivers, lakes and oceans are credited with influencing the migration. Large roosts of migrating monarchs are often formed at locations that are obstacles impeding their movement. Roosting butterflies are thought to form these roosts to wait for ideal weather conditions that will aid them in crossing these landforms, such as lack of rain, temperature, tailwinds, and sunlight. Some years, the roosting sites form predictably and consistently year to year. In other instances, roosting sites form in new areas on a transient basis. A roost of migrating monarchs can contain as few as four and possibly thousands of butterflies. Other geographic features such as the Appalachian Mountains and the Sierra Madre Oriental mountains in Mexico 'funnel' the migration, orienting it to the south and southwest. One monarch tagged in Ontario was recovered on an oil rig 100 miles (160 km) south of Galveston, Texas.

=== Columbus hypothesis ===
The Columbus Hypothesis is another theory that accounts for the phenomena of the mass migration of the eastern population of the monarch by examining historical records. This theory discusses how many butterflies engage in mass movements to expand their range or relieve pressure on their habitat. According to this theory, the eastern population did not have such an extensive range and did not migrate. Historical observations of animal life during the colonial period in America make no mention of monarch butterflies. Observations of monarchs began and seemed to be related to the deforestation of the Northeast. Monarchs were presumably residents of subtropical and tropical areas but began to move north to breed on the increased numbers of larval host plants that replaced the deforested areas. Populations found in other regions do not migrate over such long distances (in Australia, for example) This may suggest that the migratory behavior of the eastern population of the monarch butterfly developed after other populations of monarchs had become established in other regions.

=== Other theories ===
One recent hypothesis suggests that monarchs may be chemically marking certain trees, using an unknown substance, to orient the generation that returns the following winter.

Another theory denies the existence of the mass migration, but instead explains the movements of monarchs in the fall to weather conditions:

In the fall, monarch adults in Canada and the upper Midwest likely receive an environmental trigger (change in photoperiod or seasonal cold snap) and cease egg laying. When the main jets stream moves south out of Canada, high and low pressure cells become carried across extreme southern Canada and later across the US. At that time, monarchs need merely rise on thermals during clearing conditions and become carried toward the South out of the region in which they were reared. If they have reached sufficient altitude in their ride on thermals, the north winds can carry some of them considerable distance towards Mexico." Adrian Wenner, professor emeritus of natural history at the University of California, Santa Barbara

== Conservation ==
There is debate between researchers and citizen scientists who study the migration regarding the possible local extinction of the Monarch. The species was categorized as endangered by the International Union for the Conservation of Nature (IUCN) in 2022, as it has declined anywhere between 23 and 72 percent in the past 10 years. There is concern that the migration of the eastern North American population may be at risk. Media reports of the monarch's forthcoming extinction have been criticized by scientists. "Monarchs are not in danger of extinction," states Lincoln Brower, a leading monarch conservation researcher.

Monitoring and conservation organizations can be organized by their efforts directed to each of the four stages in the monarch life cycle.

"We have a lot of habitat in this country but we are losing it at a rapid pace. Development is consuming 6,000 acres a day, a loss of 2.2 million acres per year. Further, the overuse of herbicides along roadsides and elsewhere is turning diverse areas that support monarchs, pollinators, and other wildlife into grass-filled landscapes that support few species. The adoption of genetically modified soybeans and corn have further reduced monarch habitat. If these trends continue, monarchs are certain to decline, threatening the very existence of their magnificent migration." O.R. Taylor

The winter roosts in both Mexico and California were declared to be threatened by the International Union for the Conservation of Nature and Natural Resources (IUCN) in the IUCN Invertebrate Red Data Book. Historical conservation regulations began when the residents of Pacific Grove, CA passed an ordinance prohibiting the disturbance of the "peaceful occupation of the Monarch butterflies".

In 1986, the Mexican government created the Monarch Butterfly Biosphere Reserve (Mariposa Monarca Biosphere Reserve) to protect 62 square miles (16,000 ha) of forests within four separate monarch sanctuaries. The Biosphere Reserve was expanded to include 217 square miles (56,000 ha) in 2000.

=== Adult mortality ===
The protistan parasite Ophryocystis elektroscirrha may kill many migrating monarchs. It reduces flying ability, reducing the chance of reaching the overwintering sites.

=== Overwintering sites ===
Work to protect the overwintering sites in Mexico began before 1975 and was initiated by local residents. Populations of overwintering monarchs declined significantly when the 1992 counts are compared to more recent censuses. Overwintering sites exist along the Gulf Coast, Arizona and Florida.

Periodic disasters at the Mexican overwintering sites are often credited with the population decline. Some sites have experienced losses of 30% to 90% during storms. Conservation efforts in and around the overwintering sites include the planting of native tree species on which the monarchs prefer to roost.

Overwintering monarchs in California have shown to have a slight preference to roost on native species but will also consistently choose introduced eucalyptus species, even when native species are present. Roosting sites in California are typically located close to the coastline, though some have been found further inland.

=== Reductions in milkweed acreage ===
Some conservationists blame the reductions in monarch overwintering numbers in Mexico on the loss of milkweeds in the Midwestern region of the United States. 167 million acres of monarch habitat has been lost since 1996. These conservationists argue that the reduction in milkweed habitat in agricultural regions of North America is a major cause of the declines in the number of monarchs that reach Mexico. However, other top researchers doubt this claim, because it is not consistent with data collected by several long-term butterfly monitoring programs in the United States. The data from these programs do not show evidence that the numbers of breeding adult monarchs has declined since the 1990s. Despite this evidence, some conservationists cite the use of pesticides and herbicides as a cause of the declines in overwintering monarchs. They state that prior to the introduction of genetically altered corn and soybeans, milkweed was common in the crop fields. The connection between the use of GMO crops and the decline in the numbers of overwintering monarchs has been called 'suggestive but not conclusive', as there are other factors such as deforestation and weather events that could be the cause. Milkweed habitat is also destroyed by the expansion of urban and suburban areas.

By 2018, however, a study correlated monarch butterfly decline to the fact that 95% of corn and soybean crops grown in the United States were using genetically modified seeds resistant to the herbicide glyphosate. This meant that instead of spreading the herbicide only prior to seed planting, now farmers could have the herbicide spread a second time by air when weeds had begun to challenge the crops. Air application of the herbicide meant that the unplowed margins between field and road that previously supported milkweed and a range of nectar flowers were now greatly diminished.

Based on the recent evidence that failed to show declines in the breeding season, coupled with the clear declines in the number of overwintering monarchs in Mexico, some of the leading monarch researchers have embraced the theory that the problem must lie en route to Mexico, i.e. that losses during migration is the reason that fewer monarchs are seen in Mexico in recent years. Conservationists also call attention to the decreased habitat that allows the growth of nectaring plants. Other factors that may have a negative effect on the migration are extreme weather, including colder winters in central Mexico, droughts in Texas, invasive (non—milkweed) flora on which monarchs lay eggs and the increased use of synthetic insecticides that are less biodegradable.

There are many organizations and programs that exist to promote the preservation of the monarch and its migration. 3-letter codes, explained in the linked footnotes, are used to head the table compactly.

Organization or political entities	Monarch conservation programs												Database	
Organization or political entities	Hea (Note: Health monitoring contributes to conservation by studying the health of butterflies in all or various stages of its life cycle.)	Hab (Note: Habitat restoration contributes to conservation by planting larval food plants, nectaring plants and overwinter plants necessary for winter survival.)	Pol (Note: Policy contributes to the conservation by coordination of efforts across governmental and non-governmental organizations.)	Res (Note: Reserves protect habitat for the butterfly.)	Edu (Note: Education contributes to the conservation of the monarch by raising awareness and participation in conservation activities.)	Cen (Note: Censuses of the monarch provide information regarding the migration routes, relative population comparisons between different populations.)	Gra (Note: Grants are given (G) and received (R) to help foster new conservation programs and to fund research.)	Res (Note: Research provides information regarding the butterfly and its migration.)	Cit (Note: Citizen science participation involves activities by lay-persons to promote conservation.)	Tag (Note: Tagging and then recapturing monarchs provides information useful to provide information on migration.)	Reg (Note: Regulations exit to protect the butterfly and its habitat.)	Eco (Note: Economic development promotes the development of alternative sources of income around Mexican overwintering sites to prevent the harvesting of trees used by overwintering butterflies.)	Rep (Note: Repository is the accumulated data produced by scientists and citizen scientists.)	Pub (Note: Available to public indicates whether this data are shared freely to the public.)
Monarch Watch		♦			♦	♦			♦	♦			♦	♦
Monarch Joint Venture			♦											
Association for butterflies	♦				♦		G	♦	♦					
Project Monarch Health	♦							♦	♦				♦	
Pollinator Partnership		♦	♦		♦									
UNESCO		♦		♦										
La Naturaleza Nos Llama		♦		♦		♦		♦				♦		
National Park System		♦	♦	♦							♦			
Executive Order – Presidential Memorandum		♦	♦											
Xerces			♦		♦	♦	R	♦	♦	♦			♦	♦
Volunteer Match		♦			♦				♦					
Iowa Department of Natural Resources Iowa Prairie Resource Center		♦			♦				♦					
California State Park system		♦		♦										
City ordinance of Capitola, California			♦	♦							♦			
The Coastal Zone Management Act, California			♦								♦			
Assessment and Status Report, Canada			♦								♦			
Monarch Butterfly Fund					♦		G							
Forest For Monarchs		♦					R					♦		
Larson Juhl		♦										♦		
Monarch Ecology Fund		♦												
Plantit		♦												
Global Climate Summit California Environmental Protection Agency		♦	♦				G							
USDA			♦								♦			
Medio Ambiente y Recursos Naturales			♦	♦			G				♦	♦		
Texas Milkweeds and Monarchs		♦	♦	♦	♦			♦	♦		♦	♦	♦	♦
Wild Ones Wild for Monarchs		♦			♦									
Mission monarch					♦	♦		♦	♦					♦

== Economics ==
Tourism around the overwintering sites in Mexico and California provides income for those who provide such services.

Residents near the overwintering sites are concerned that their children do not have enough to eat so they are forced to continue illegal logging. Other residents take advantage of the months butterflies overwinter near their homes. Though they consider themselves quite poor, it is possible for them to generate enough income to last them through the year acting as guides, providing lodging and meals, selling crafts and souvenirs.

Overwintering monarchs roost in trees on privately owned land. Laws and regulations regarding the protection of the overwintering sites and habitat override the interests of land owners, farmer' cooperatives and local governing bodies.

In 1986, Mexico created sanctuaries for the winter months. Sections of the forest were closed to the local people who depended on lumber for their income. Small-scale logging operations continued though illegal. Conservation organizations pay residents to patrol the forest.

Contributions are solicited to fund programs that support monarch conservation efforts. Some donations to conservation programs are directed toward fundraising for the organization.

== Politics ==
The scientific and conservation efforts require the involvement of the United States, Canada and Mexico. This has resulted in the formation of the North American Monarch Conservation plan. Conservation plans in Mexico have been suggested to be deficient.

Conservation has both practical and theoretical components, with the former often having little to do with science or biology. Education shapes attitudes, a sympathetic populace lobbies government, regulations are instituted, and where possible, land is set aside as reserves. Joel Berger, University of Nevada

=== Affected people groups ===
Indigenous people, residents, farmers, and landowners surrounding the overwintering sites have made statements about their dissatisfaction with the involvement of Canadian and American conservationists concerning the enforcement of restricting the use of lands in and around preserves. Sustainable development in the areas surrounding overwintering colonies has been identified as a major factor in conservation efforts. It refers to the replacement of economic activities that have a negative effect on conservation efforts with economic opportunities that have a positive effect on conservation goals. Mexican communities have expressed concern with the limitations placed on their use of land and resources. Conservation proposals are met with 'little enthusiasm' if not inclusive of local interests.

Sustainable development and conservation today is a problem of marketing and financing, with real numbers and real mechanisms-not of good intentions. – Roberto Solis, Instituto Nacional de Ecologia, Mexico

Animal research in conservation has a role but it has little significance unless sociological, economic and political issues are satisfactorily resolved.

Access to overwintering colonies is tightly controlled by Mexico and monitored by Profepa, Universidad Nacional Autonoma de Mexico (UNAM), Instituto Politécnico Nacional (IPN), Monarch Butterfly Biosphere Reserve (MBBR), local and international volunteers. The world Wildlife Fund pays for the salaries of enforcement officers.

=== Policies ===
Local people groups, municipalities, government and non-governmental organizations have proposed policies to preserve the migration. A trilateral effort involving Mexico, Canada and the United States known as the North American Monarch Conservation Plan (NAMCP) was established to organize conservation efforts and protect the habitats along migratory routes, breeding grounds, and overwintering sites. One policy that has been implemented is the mass planting of milkweed and nectar plants.

Mexico has developed other policies to help preserve the migration. Payments to local residents to monitor forest habitats have been considered. Another policy is to encourage reforestation of overwintering habitat. Efforts to limit activities at the overwintering sites (logging, tourism) that may disturb the monarchs roosts have been attempted.

The University of Minnesota co-ordinates studies across North America to monitor the health and populations of monarch larvae. Other organizations lobby lawmakers, corporations, highway departments, utilities and policy-makers to preserve habitat.

=== U.S. national strategy ===
On June 20, 2014, President Barack Obama issued a presidential memorandum entitled "Creating a Federal Strategy to Promote the Health of Honey Bees and Other Pollinators". The memorandum established a Pollinator Health Task Force, to be co-chaired by the Secretary of Agriculture and the Administrator of the Environmental Protection Agency, and stated:

The number of migrating Monarch butterflies sank to the lowest recorded population level in 2013–14, and there is an imminent risk of failed migration.

The U.S. General Services Administration (GSA) publishes sets of landscape performance requirements in its P100 documents, which mandate standards for the GSA's Public Buildings Service. Beginning in March 2015, those performance requirements and their updates have included four primary aspects for planting designs that are intended to provide adequate on-site foraging opportunities for targeted pollinators. The targeted pollinators include bees, butterflies, and other beneficial insects.

In May 2015, the Pollinator Health Task Force issued a "National Strategy to Promote the Health of Honey Bees and Other Pollinators". The strategy laid out federal actions to achieve three goals, two of which were:

- Monarch Butterflies: Increase the Eastern population of the monarch butterfly to 225 million butterflies occupying an area of approximately 15 acres (6 hectares) in the overwintering grounds in Mexico, through domestic/international actions and public-private partnerships, by 2020.
- Pollinator Habitat Acreage: Restore or enhance 7 million acres of land for pollinators over the next 5 years through Federal actions and public/private partnerships.

Many of the priority projects that the National Strategy identified focused on the I-35 corridor, which extends for 1,500 miles (2,400 km) from Texas to Minnesota. The area through which that highway travels provides spring and summer breeding habitats in the United States' key monarch migration corridor.

The Task Force simultaneously issued a "Pollinator Research Action Plan". The Plan outlined five main action areas, covered in ten subject-specific chapters. The action areas were: (1) Setting a Baseline; (2) Assessing Environmental Stressors; (3) Restoring Habitat; (4) Understanding and Supporting Stakeholders; (5) Curating and Sharing Knowledge.

In May 2015, the U.S. Department of Agriculture (USDA) and the U.S. Department of the Interior (USDI) issued a 52-page document entitled "Pollinator-Friendly Best Management Practices for Federal Lands". The document consolidated general information about the practices and procedures to use when considering pollinator needs in project development and management of Federal lands that are managed for native diversity and multiple uses. The document also contained a series of actions to be considered when determining those lands best suited for restoration and rehabilitation of monarch habitat. These included an assurance that native wildflowers are available, diverse and abundant to provide nectar for monarchs, and an assurance that milkweed species that female monarchs prefer for egg laying are available or will be planted. The document identified those milkweed species for each of seven regions within the United States.

On December 4, 2015, President Obama signed into law the Fixing America's Surface Transportation (FAST) Act (Pub. L. 114-94). The FAST Act placed a new emphasis on efforts to support pollinators. To accomplish this, the FAST Act amended Title 23 (Highways) of the United States Code. The amendment directed the United States Secretary of Transportation, when carrying out programs under that title in conjunction with willing states, to:

1. encourage integrated vegetation management practices on roadsides and other transportation rights-of-way, including reduced mowing; and
2. encourage the development of habitat and forage for Monarch butterflies, other native pollinators, and honey bees through plantings of native forbs and grasses, including noninvasive, native milkweed species that can serve as migratory way stations for butterflies and facilitate migrations of other pollinators.

The FAST Act also stated that activities to establish and improve pollinator habitat, forage, and migratory way stations may be eligible for Federal funding if related to transportation projects funded under Title 23.

In February 2016, the Office of the Secretary of the Interior issued a memorandum containing an attachment entitled "Strategy for Implementing Pollinator-Friendly Landscaping Design and Maintenance at Department of the Interior Sites". The attachment described specific actions that would address the incorporation of pollinator-friendly landscaping design and maintenance into new construction and major renovations, existing sites, contracts, leases and occupancy agreements, and education/outreach programs. The memorandum containing the attachment directed the USDI's bureaus and offices (which include the Bureau of Land Management and the National Park Service) to implement those actions to the extent that they are appropriate for, and consistent with, the mission and function of the facility/site.

In June 2016, the Pollinator Health Task Force issued a "Pollinator Partnership Action Plan". That Plan provided examples of past, ongoing, and possible future collaborations between the federal government and non-federal institutions to support pollinator health under each of the National Strategy's goals.

The USDA's Farm Service Agency helps increase U.S. populations of monarch butterfly and other pollinators through its Conservation Reserve Program's State Acres for Wildlife Enhancement (SAFE) Initiative. The SAFE Initiative provides an annual rental payment to farmers who agree to remove environmentally sensitive land from agricultural production and who plant species that will improve environmental health and quality. Among other things, the initiative encourages landowners to establish wetlands, grasses, and trees to create habitats for species that the FWS has designated to be threatened or endangered.

As part of its targeted monarch butterfly effort, the USDA's Natural Resources Conservation Service (NRCS) works with agricultural producers in the midwest and southern Great Plains to combat the decline of monarch butterflies by planting milkweed and other nectar-rich plants on private lands. The NRCS also provides region-specific guides and plant lists that support populations of monarch butterflies and other pollinators in the Greater Appalachian Mountains Region, the Midwest Region, the Northern and Southern Great Plains, and the Western Coastal Plain.

In January 2024, staff of the National Capital Planning Commission (the federal government's planning agency for the National Capital Region) introduced a "Pollinator Best Practices Resource Guide". The Guide summarizes existing federal guidance from the Council on Environmental Quality, the USDA, and the GSA regarding best practices for creating pollinator habitats in both meadow and non-meadow/designed landscapes. When discussing milkweeds, the Guide states that although more than 100 species of such plants are considered native to North America, Asclepias syriaca, or common milkweed, stands out and "is clearly an important species that is critical to the survival of monarch butterflies".

=== Endangered species designation ===
Both the United States and Canada have considered federal protection for the monarch, although these efforts come with some controversy. In the United States, based on the 20-yr declines seen in the numbers of monarchs that reach Mexico each fall, the Center for Biological Diversity, The Center for Food Safety, The Xerces Society and Lincoln Brower have filed a petition to the Interior Department (USA) to protect the monarch by having it declared as a threatened species. The environmental activist Robert Kennedy has endorsed the petition but has said the designation should be 'threatened', not 'endangered'. Critics state monarchs are not threatened and do not need Federal protection. Listing the monarch could divert funding take attention away from rarer species at greater risk of extinction. Critics also are concerned about what the petition does not say.

... it could create a backlash. Fear of regulation, he said, could make landowners into opponents. He pointed out the petition calls for the "designation of critical habitat" via the powers of the act, but doesn't spell out what that means. Chip Taylor, Monarch Watch

On December 12, 2024, the United States Fish and Wildlife Service (USFWS) published in the Federal Register a proposed rule that would list the monarch butterfly (Danaus plexippus) as a threatened species and would designate the butterfly's critical habitat in accordance with the provisions of the Endangered Species Act of 1973. The USFWS estimated in the proposed rule that the probability of extinction in the foreseeable future (60 years) is 56-74 percent for the eastern monarch migratory population and 99 percent for the western migratory population. The proposed rule designated seven areas near California's Pacific coast as "critical habitat units" for monarch butterflies. The USFWS accepted comments on the proposed rule until March 12, 2025, but later extended the comment period to May 15, 2025.

In December 2023, the Government of Canada listed the monarch as an endangered species under the federal Species at Risk Act. The listing protects the butterfly on Canadian federal lands by making it illegal to kill, hurt, catch, or remove a monarch egg, caterpillar, chrysalis or adult when on land that the Canadian federal government owns and/or administers. These include Canadian national parks, national wildlife areas, military bases and First Nations reserves. It is also illegal to possess, collect, buy, sell, or trade an individual monarch or any part or derivative of an individual when on that land. The Canadian government must prepare a recovery strategy and one or more action plans for the species to outline the work that can be done to conserve the species. The strategy must identify the critical habitat necessary for the monarch to survive and recover in Canada.

=== Scientific community ===
Differences in opinions by researchers are common and not all researchers are regarding lobbying for federal government intervention, steps to take to conserve the migration, and the possible endangered status of the monarch. They have been critical of the data generated by citizen scientists calling it 'inappropriate'. Some researchers have been critical of each other for not making their data available to the public and to each other. Like all scientific research, opinions are voiced, sometimes explicitly. One scientistist is critical of the first tagging efforts by Fred Urquhart calling it an "amateurish self-serving approach to biology that isn't science". Another researcher denies that the monarch migrates but instead is greatly affected by weather conditions to head south.

=== State and local governments ===
A Scientific Collecting Permit (SCP) is required to handle wild monarchs in California including for educational purposes. It is unlawful to collect, remove from the wild and/or captively rear monarchs in California without an SCP.

As of June 2025, at least 14 states (California, Connecticut, Illinois, Kentucky, Maryland, Massachusetts, Minnesota, Missouri, New Jersey, New Mexico, New York, North Carolina, Ohio, Vermont and Washington) had enacted legislation to protect, develop and restore habitat suitable for pollinators. For example, the New Jersey General Assembly considered legislation in 2014 that was intended to increase the monarch butterfly's migrating population within the state. New Jersey's government subsequently approved legislation in May 2017 that established an "Integrated Roadside Vegetation Management Program". Among other things, the legislation required the state's transportation department to develop and adopt a plan for "cost effective maintenance and planting along roadsides, with an emphasis on adaptable vegetation with long life cycles, native vegetation, and wildflowers".

In January 2018, the New Jersey government approved an "Adopt a Monarch Butterfly Waystation Act" and a "Milkweed for Monarchs Act". The latter act required the state's environmental protection department to establish criteria for the planting of milkweed in stormwater management basins on state-owned lands and to take related actions.

In June 2019, Tennessee's transportation department announced a partnership with the state's environment and conservation and agriculture departments to promote pollinator health and awareness in the state's parks. The partners expected to install pollinator meadows and interpretive signage in nine such parks. Virginia's wildlife resources department encourages plantings of native species that are highly beneficial to pollinators, such as Asclepias (milkweeds), Pycnanthemum (mountain mints), and plants in the Asteraceae family, which includes Coreopsis, Helianthus (sunflowers), Rudbeckia (coneflowers), Solidago (goldenrods), and Eutrochium (Joe-Pye weeds).

In April 2025, the Chicago Park District's general superintendent launched "Project Monarch", a citywide initiative to conserve and celebrate monarch butterflies and their habitats. In addition, many local jurisdictions throughout the United States have made commitments to increase monarch habitat by joining "Monarch City USA" or by taking the National Wildlife Federation's "Mayors' Monarch Pledge" and planting native milkweeds and other nectar plants within their boundaries.

== See also ==
- Conservation biology – Study of threats to biological diversity
- Lepidoptera migration – Migration of butterflies or moths

== Bibliography ==
Books

- Halpern, Sue (2002). Four Wings and a Prayer: Caught in the Mystery of the Monarch Butterfly (Kindle ed.). New York: Random House. ISBN 978-0-307-78720-0.
- Malcolm, Stephen B.; Zalucki, Myron P., eds. (1993). Biology and Conservation of the Monarch Butterfly. Second International Conference on the Monarch Butterfly, Sept. 2–5, 1986. Science Series. Vol. 38. Los Angeles: Natural History Museum of Los Angeles County. OCLC 27655571.
- Oberhauser, Karen S.; Batalden, Rebecca; Howard, Elizabeth (2009). Monarch Butterfly Monitoring in North America: Overviews and Protocols. Montreal: The Commission for Environmental Cooperation. ISBN 978-2-923358-56-7.
- Oberhauser, Karen S.; Solensky, Michelle J. (2004). The Monarch Butterfly: Biology and Conservation (First ed.). Ithaca, NY: Cornell University Press. ISBN 978-0-8014-4188-2.
- Pyle, Robert Michael (1981). National Audubon Society Field Guide to North American Butterflies. New York: Alfred A. Knopf. ISBN 978-0-394-51914-2.
- Pyle, Robert Michael (2010). Mariposa Road: The First Butterfly Big Year. New York: Houghton Mifflin Harcourt Publishing Company. ISBN 978-0-618-94539-9.
- Pyle, Robert Michael (2014). Chasing Monarchs: Migrating with the Butterflies of Passage. Yale University Press. ISBN 978-0-300-20387-5.
- Urquhart, Fred A. (1960). The Monarch Butterfly. University of Toronto Press. OL 26536128M.

Journal articles

- Brower, Lincoln (1977). "Monarch Migration". Natural History. 85 (6).
- Brower, Lincoln P.; Fink, Linda S.; Brower, Andrew Van Zandt; Leong, Kingston; Oberhauser, Karen; Altizer, Sonia; Taylor, Orley; Vickerman, Danel; Calvert, William H.; Van Hook, Tonya; Alonso-Mejia, Alphonso; Malcolm, Stephen B.; Owen, Denis F.; Zalucki, Myron P. (September 1995). "On the dangers of interpopulational transfers of monarch butterflies". BioScience. 45 (8): 540–544. doi:10.2307/1312699. JSTOR 1312699.
- Davis, Andrew K. (June 20, 2011). "Are migratory monarchs really declining in eastern North America? Examining evidence from two fall census programs". Insect Conservation and Diversity. 5 (2): x. doi:10.1111/j.1752-4598.2011.00158.x.
- Davis, Andrew K. (2014). "Opinion: conservation of monarch butterflies (Danaus plexippus) could be enhanced with analyses and publication of citizen science tagging data". Insect Conservation and Diversity. 8 (2): 103–106. doi:10.1111/icad.12084. S2CID 84231577.
