= Monarch Watch =

Volunteer science organization

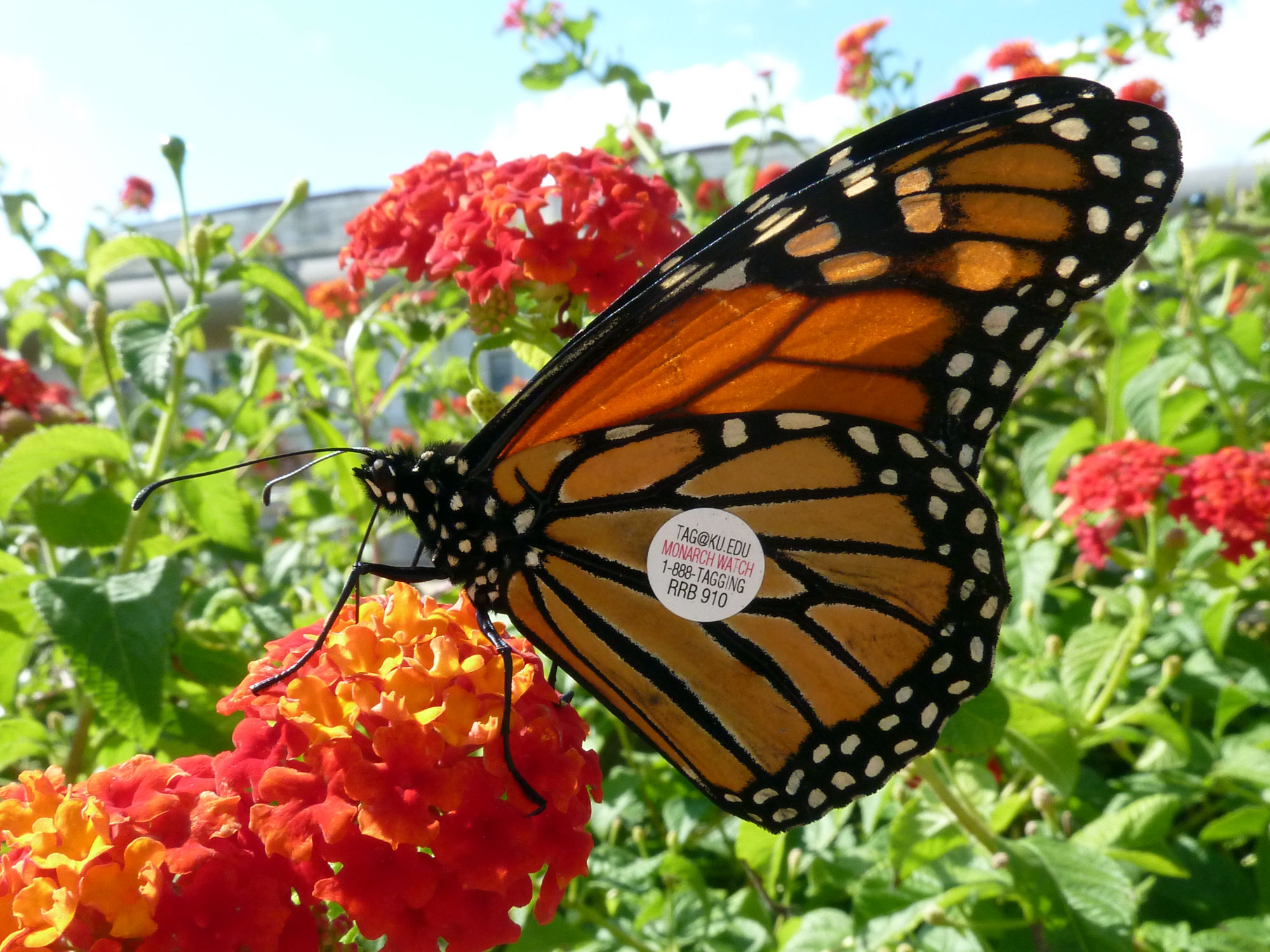
- Monarch butterfly with a Monarch Watch tag
- Founder: Orley R. "Chip" Taylor
- Type: Volunteer-based citizen science organization
- Purpose: Tracks the fall migration of the monarch butterfly
- Headquarters: University of Kansas
- Director: Orley R. "Chip" Taylor

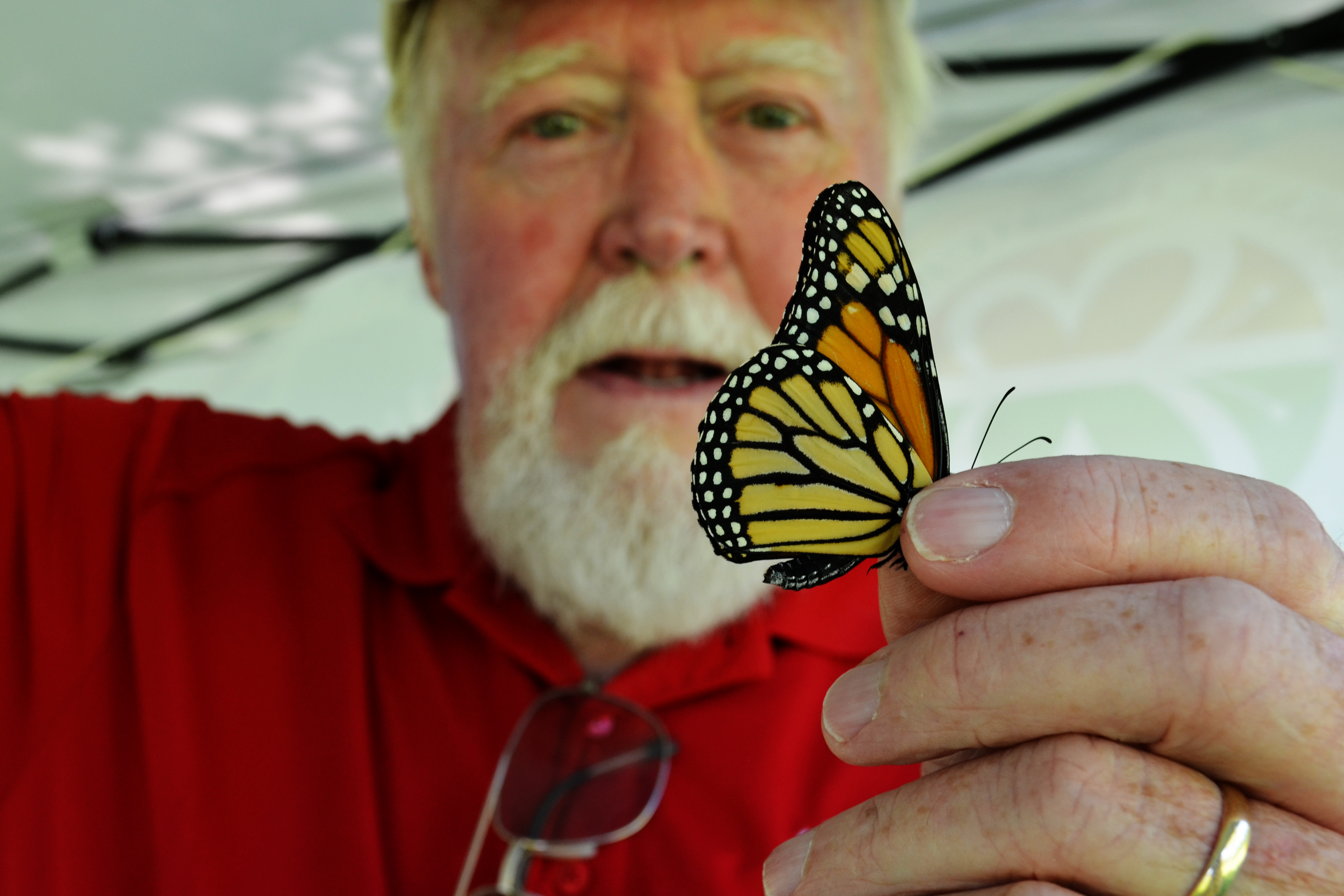
Chip Taylor, Director of Monarch Watch, holding a monarch butterfly

Monarch Watch is a volunteer-based citizen science organization that tracks the fall migration of the monarch butterfly. It is self-described as "a nonprofit education, conservation, and research program based at the University of Kansas that focuses on the monarch butterfly, its habitat, and its spectacular fall migration."

== Organization ==
The informal organization is largely supported by teachers and students participating in "classroom projects, collaborative research" among other opportunities. Its founder and director is Orley R. "Chip" Taylor, a "world-renowned expert on butterflies and their migration patterns." The organization creates and distributes tags to place on monarch butterflies in order to track their migration path from Canada and the United States to south-central Mexico. The tagging method used is derived from the one that was developed by Canadian scientist, Fred Urquhart. The tagging process was adapted by Orley Taylor to minimize the damage to the butterflies. Color-coded tags are glued to a monarch butterfly's wing. Volunteers have tagged over 1.5 million monarchs in the last 26 years from Colorado to Canada.

== Monarch Waystation Program ==
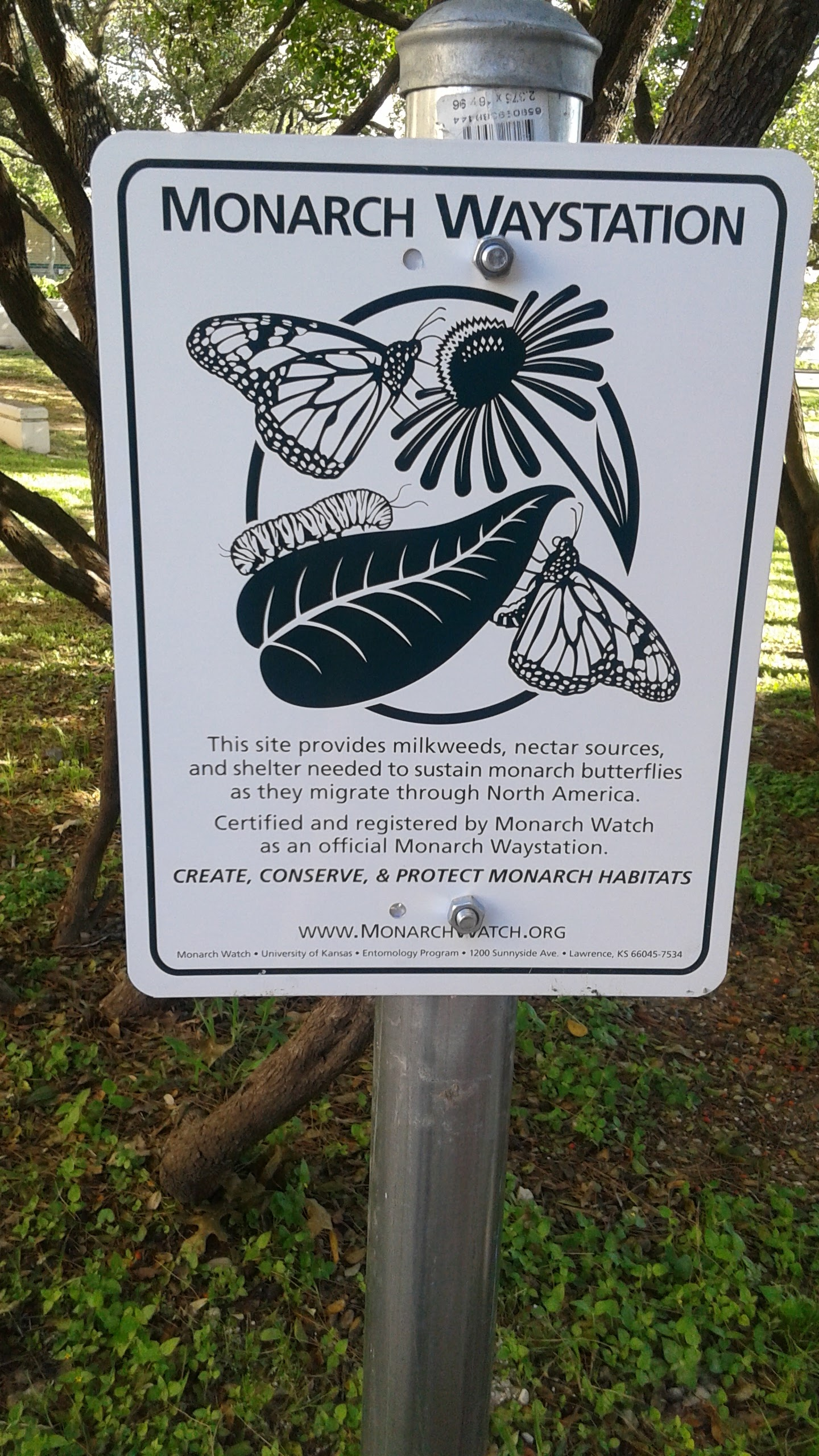
Monarch Waystation Sign

The monarch butterfly is also known as the milkweed butterfly due to its subsistence on the milkweed plant for its habitat. Largely due to commercial farming practices, the habitats of monarch butterflies have declined. In an effort to mitigate the destruction of the monarch butterflies natural habitat, Monarch Watch has called for volunteers to plant milkweed wherever possible. Milkweed is essential to the life-cycle of the monarch butterfly as they lay their eggs on the underside of the plant's leaves. It is possible to register and certify a site that is designated as a "Monarch Waystation." These sites can also be added to an interactive map that is monitored by Monarch Watch. The program also offers free milkweed plugs to people that engage in the creation of habitats for monarchs and pollinators. Primary consideration is given to non-profits and schools. There is an application process to receive the milkweed from Monarch Watch.

== Bring Back the Monarchs Campaign ==
Monarch Watch is not only focused on tracking the fall migration of monarchs, but also on the conservation of the monarch butterfly through the preservation and restoration of monarch habitats. The destruction of habitats has negatively affected the monarch butterfly population as well as that of other pollinators. Habitat shrinkage has resulted in the extinction of several species of pollinators over the last 50 years. The monarch butterfly is also affected by parasites and the "declining winter habitat in Mexico." Monarch Watch's efforts in this arena are specifically referred to at the "Bring Back the Monarchs Campaign." The Bring Back the Monarchs Campaign is an offshoot of the Monarch Waystation Program.

=== Milkweed Market ===
Beyond offering free milkweed plugs, Monarch Watch also offers a shop by which an individual can purchase milkweed for the purpose of creating monarch habitats. The milkweed species offered to the buyer is contingent on the buyer's zip code, in an effort to ensure that only native milkweed is planted in the appropriate regional areas.
