= Mike Slee =

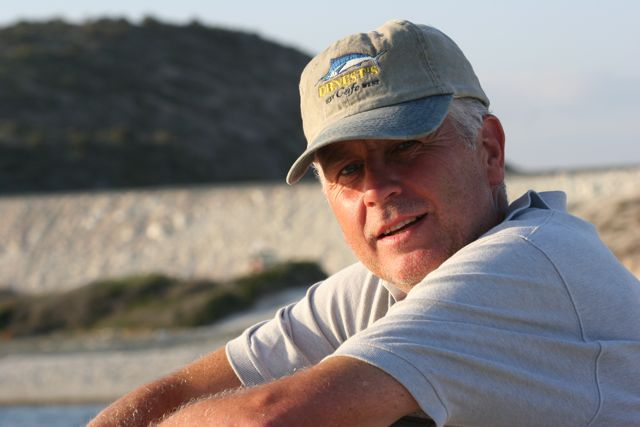
- Mike Slee
- Born: 23 August 1959 (age 67); Windlesham, Surrey, England
- Occupations: Film director; film producer; screenwriter
- Years active: 1986–present

Michael John Slee (born 23 August 1959) is a British film-maker, producer/director and writer.

== Life and career ==
Born in Windlesham, Surrey, Slee studied Art & Design at Kingston University, and graduated with a first class honours degree from the London College of Printing in Photography, Film and TV. He first achieved industry recognition for directing James Burke, in the 1989 ACE Award-winning PBS documentary series After the Warming. This prescient series dealt with the issue of global warming, using virtual reality computer simulations.

Slee then directed a 20-part TLC series with Burke, called Connections 2. By 1997 he was at the forefront of large screen IMAX film making, co-devising and directing Wildfire – Feel the Heat for the Discovery Channel, and The Legend of Loch Lomond for the Strathclyde European Partnership. In 2003 he co-wrote and directed BUGS 3D!, a $9 million IMAX 3D natural history drama, narrated by Judi Dench. The film was a semi-finalist at the 2004 Oscars, and was awarded the GSTA Lifelong Learning Honor in the same year.

Slee directed the 2005 British television programme, The Gunpowder Plot: Exploding The Legend. In 2008 he directed the feature film Meerkat Manor: The Story Begins, which was narrated by Whoopi Goldberg. Based on the ubiquitous Animal Planet television series, the film was selected for the Tribeca Film Festival.

In 2011 he began filming the IMAX 3D project Flight of the Butterflies. Covering Dr Fred Urquhart's nearly 40-year-long scientific investigation into the monarch butterfly. Principal filming of the one-year project was completed in early March 2012, The film had its world premiere on 24 September 2012, at the Smithsonian's National Museum of Natural History in Washington, D.C., hosted by the Federal government of Mexico, through the Mexico Tourism Board and the Embassy of Mexico.

== Filmography ==
As director

- The Kid (1986)
- After the Warming (1989)
- Connections 2 (1989)
- Wildfire: Feel the Heat (1999)
- The Legend of Loch Lomond (2001)
- Bugs (2003)
- Megastructures (2004)
- The Gunpowder Plot: Exploding The Legend (2005)
- Perfect Disaster: Ice Storm (2006)
- Voyages of Discovery (2006)
- Meerkat Manor: The Story Begins (2008)
- Into the Unknown with Josh Bernstein (2008)
- The Secret Life of Primates (2009)
- Hammond Meets Moss (2010)
- Atlas 4D (2010)
- Engineering Connections (2008–2011)
- Richard Hammond's Journey to... (2011)
- Flight of the Butterflies (2012)
- The Great Martian War 1913-1917 (2013)
- Colombia, magia salvaje (2015)
