= Stephanie Sigman =

Mexican and American actress

- Sigman in 2026
- Born: 28 February 1987 (age 39); Ciudad Obregón, Sonora, Mexico
- Citizenship: Mexican; American
- Occupation: Actress
- Years active: 2006–present
- Spouse: Brian Andrew Mendoza
- Children: 2

Stephanie Sigman Conde (born February 28, 1987) is a Mexican and American actress. Her breakthrough role was in the 2011 Mexican crime drama film Miss Bala. She has gone on to appear in Pioneer (2013), Spectre (2015), Going Under (2016), and Annabelle: Creation (2017). On television, Sigman starred in Narcos (2015) and S.W.A.T (2017) for the first and second seasons of both series.

== Early life and family ==
Sigman was born in Ciudad Obregón, Sonora on 28 February 1987 to a Mexican mother and an American father, Lee Sigman, a New York Yankees scout from Kansas. She is a U.S. citizen through her father. Her brother, baseball player Kenneth Ray Sigman, was formerly married to actress Barbara Mori.

== Career ==
Sigman began her career appearing on Mexican television, before making her film debut in Rio de Oro. In 2011, she played the leading role of Laura Guerrero in the Mexican crime drama film, Miss Bala. The film was selected as the Mexican entry for the Best Foreign Language Film at the 84th Academy Awards, but it did not make the final shortlist. Sigman was nominated for a Dublin Film Critics' Circle Award in 2011 for her performance in film. The following year, she played Catalina Aguado in the Canadian documentary film Flight of the Butterflies. In 2013, Sigman co-starred in the Norwegian thriller Pioneer.

In 2013, Sigman played the leading role in the USA Network drama pilot The Arrangement opposite Bryan Greenberg. It was not ordered to series. Later that year, she was cast in a recurring role on the FX crime drama series The Bridge. She also starred in the Arctic Monkeys music video for "Snap Out of It" in 2014. In 2015, Sigman played Valeria Vélez, a character based on Virginia Vallejo, in the Netflix crime thriller Narcos.

In 2015, Sigman appeared in the James Bond film Spectre, becoming the second Mexican actress to play a Bond girl after Linda Christian first played the role of Valerie Mathis in the 1954 TV adaptation of Casino Royale. She later was cast as a female lead in the action comedy Going Under, as well as War on Everyone.

In 2016, Sigman had a recurring role as Monica Ava during the second season of the ABC anthology drama series American Crime created by John Ridley. Ridley later cast Sigman in the leading role as Presence Foster, the former Army veteran who finds herself as unlicensed Private Investigator, in the ABC detective drama pilot, Presence.

In 2017, Sigman began playing Jessica Cortez, captain and commanding officer of the LAPD Metropolitan Division in S.W.A.T.. She exited at the start of the third season, when her character left to pursue FBI training.

Sigman starred as Sister Charlotte in the 2017 horror film Annabelle: Creation.

== Personal life ==
Sigman is married to Brian Andrew Mendoza. They have a child born in 2019.

== Filmography ==
=== Film ===
Year	Title	Role	Notes
2006	Con lujo de detalle	Mujer	Short film
2010	Rio de Oro	Estela	
2011	Miss Bala	Laura Guerrero	Nominated — Dublin Film Critics' Circle Award for Best Breakthrough
2012	Morelos	Francisca Ortiz	
2012	Flight of the Butterflies	Catalina Aguado	Documentary film
2013	El cielo es azul	Laurada	
2013	Pioneer	Maria Salatzar	
2014	Alicia en el país de María	Alicia	
2015	Spectre	Estrella	
2016	War on Everyone	Delores	
2017	Shimmer Lake	Steph Burton	
2017	Once Upon a Time in Venice	Lupe	
2017	Annabelle: Creation	Sister Charlotte	

=== Television ===
Year	Title	Role	Notes
2013	The Arrangement	Lourdes Nieves	Pilot
2013–2014	The Bridge	Eva Guerra	Recurring role
2015–2016	Narcos	Valeria Velez	Main role
2016	American Crime	Monica Ava	Recurring role
2016	Presence	Presence Foster	Pilot
2017–2019	S.W.A.T.	Jessica Cortez	Main role (seasons 1–2)
2023	Royal Crackers	Abuelita (voice)	Episode: "Casa de Darby"
2026	Nemesis	Det. Nicollette Harper	All episodes
