= Dublin Film Critics' Circle Awards 2011 =

6th DFCC Awards

December 23, 2011

Best Film:
Drive

The 6th Dublin Film Critics' Circle Awards, given on December 23, 2011, honored the best in film for 2011. The crime Drive became the most successful film of this year's ceremony, won three awards, including Best Film.

== Awards ==
=== Top 10 Film ===
1. Drive

2. Black Swan

3. The Tree of Life

4. Tinker Tailor Soldier Spy

5. Melancholia

6. Take Shelter

7. Senna

8. True Grit

9. A Separation

10. Animal Kingdom

=== Top 10 Irish Film ===
1. The Guard

2. Snap

3. Sensation

4. Rewind

5. As If I Am Not There

6. One Hundred Mornings

7. Knuckle

8. The Runway

9. Between the Canals

10. Parked

=== Top 10 Directors ===
1. Nicolas Winding Refn, Drive

2. Terrence Malick, The Tree of Life

3. Darren Aronofsky, Black Swan

4. Tomas Alfredson, Tinker Tailor Soldier Spy

5. Lars von Trier, Melancholia

6. Martin Scorsese, Hugo

7. David Michod, Animal Kingdom

8. Joel and Ethan Coen, True Grit

9. Lynne Ramsay, We Need to Talk About Kevin

10. Takeshi Miike, 13 Assassins

=== Top 10 Actors ===
1. Ryan Gosling, Drive

2. Michael Shannon, Take Shelter

3. Gary Oldman, Tinker Tailor Soldier Spy

4. Colin Firth, The King's Speech

5. Nick Nolte, Warrior

6. Brendan Gleeson, The Guard

7. Aidan Gillen, Treacle Jr

8. Jeff Bridges, True Grit

9. Dominic Cooper, The Devil's Double

10. Neil Maskell, Kill List tied with Peter Mullan, Tyrannosaur

=== Top 10 Actresses ===
1. Jessica Chastain, The Tree of Life

2. Tilda Swinton, We Need to Talk About Kevin

3. Natalie Portman, Black Swan

4. Michelle Williams, Blue Valentine

5. Kirsten Dunst, Melancholia

6. Emily Watson, Oranges and Sunshine

7. Hailee Steinfeld, True Grit

8. Olivia Colman, Tyrannosaur

9. Jacki Weaver, Animal Kingdom tie with Yun Jung-hee, Poetry

10. Viola Davis, The Help

=== Top 10 Documentaries ===
1. Senna

2. Project Nim

3. Inside Job

4. Cave of Forgotten Dreams

5. Knuckle

6. Bobby Fischer Against the World

7. Pina

8. Page One: Inside the New York Times

9. TT3D: Closer to the Edge

10. Tabloid

=== Top 10 Breakthrough ===
1. Jessica Chastain, The Tree of Life - The Help - Take Shelter

2. John Michael McDonagh, The Guard

3. Richard Ayoade, Submarine

4. Hailee Steinfeld, True Grit

5. Carmel Winters, Snap

6. Asif Kapadia, Senna

7. Juanita Wilson, As If I Am Not There

8. Ben Wheatley, Kill List

9. Paddy Considine, Tyrannosaur tie with Justin Kurzel, Snowtown

10. Stephanie Sigman, Miss Bala

=== Best Irish Documentary ===
Knuckle

=== Best Irish Breakthrough ===
John Michael McDonagh, The Guard
