= Flight of the Butterflies =

- Flight of the Butterflies poster
- Directed by: Mike Slee
- Written by: Mike Slee; Wendy MacKeigan
- Produced by: Jonathan Barker; Rafael Cuervo; Mike Slee
- Starring: Gordon Pinsent; Patricia Phillips
- Narrated by: Megan Follows
- Cinematography: Simon De Glanville; Paul Williams
- Edited by: Susan Shipton
- Production companies: SK Films; Sin Sentido Films
- Distributed by: SK Films
- Release date: September 24, 2012 (National Museum of Natural History)
- Running time: 44 minutes
- Country: Canada
- Language: English
- Box office: $1.05 million

Flight of the Butterflies is a 2012 Canadian documentary film directed and co-written by Mike Slee for 3D IMAX, starring Megan Follows, Gordon Pinsent, and Shaun Benson. The film covers Dr. Fred Urquhart's nearly 40-year-long scientific investigation into the monarch butterfly (Danaus plexippus), tracking the details of what is considered one of the longest known insect migrations: the flight of the monarch butterfly from Central Mexico to the United States and Canada and back.

== Synopsis ==
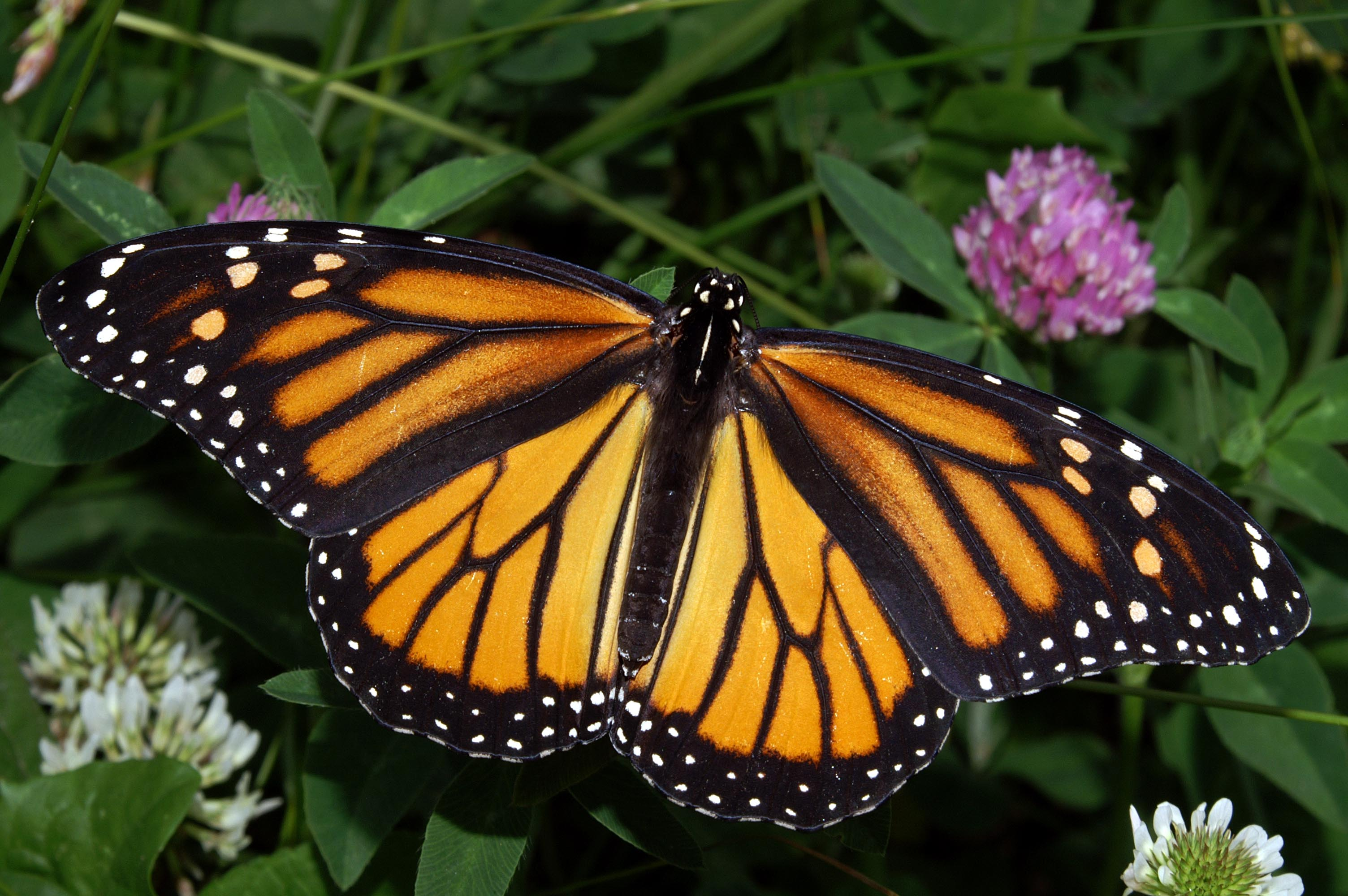
Female monarch

Monarch butterflies are a familiar sight in the United States and Canada most of the year, but disappear from most locations in winter. The documentary film weaves together factual information about the monarchs with a dramatic re-enactment of the search for the answer to the mystery of where they spend the winter. The story line follows Urquhart as a child in Canada, fascinated by the butterflies; his years of research and study, together with his wife and collaborator Norah, into their life and migration; and their recruitment of a pair of amateur naturalists in Mexico to search for and ultimately find the butterflies there, concluding with his time decades later as a senior scientist looking back at his investigations and discoveries about the insect's life pattern. In addition to finding the overwintering sites, he discovered that it takes two or three generations for the monarch butterflies to reach the Canadian breeding grounds, while one much-longer-lived "supergeneration" makes the 2,500-mile (4,000 km) return trip south into central Mexico.

== Cast ==
- Megan Follows as Narrator
- Gordon Pinsent as Dr Fred Urquhart
- Shaun Benson as Ken Brugger
- Patricia Phillips as Norah Urquhart
- Sofía Sisniega as Chloe
- Stephanie Sigman as Catalina Aguado
- Jayden Greig as Ice cream boy

== Production ==
With Mike Slee announced as director, the film went into principal development in February 2007. In August 2007, the U.S. National Science Foundation awarded a three million dollar grant to Canadian SK Films to both develop the film for the giant screen and create its educational outreach program. The grant amount is the maximum available from the NSF. Filming took place through 2011 and 2012, and tracked the butterflies from their winter habitats in central Mexico to their breeding grounds in the southern United States to their summer habitat in Canada, and their subsequent return to Mexico. In filming the butterflies, director Slee considered using balloons, helicopters, and cables, but ultimately decided on use of a 70-foot crane. SK Films announced that principal filming of the one-year project was completed in early March 2012.

== Release ==
The film had its world premiere on September 24, 2012, at the Smithsonian's National Museum of Natural History in Washington, D.C., hosted by the Federal government of Mexico, through the Mexico Tourism Board and the Embassy of Mexico.

An early version of the film was screened at the Maryland Science Center on March 31, 2012, and the completed IMAX version distributed and screened in early October 2012 at various 3D IMAX theaters such as the Liberty Science Center in Jersey City, New Jersey. Portions of the film's box office receipts went to fund butterfly conservation efforts.

=== Home media ===
The film was released on a Blu-ray 3D / 4K UHD combo pack by Shout Factory on July 12, 2016.

== Reception ==
The film has been favorably received by multiple sources. Variety compared the film to March of the Penguins, writing that as a non-commercial film, it "neatly balances entertainment and education" in a manner "bound to fascinate schoolchildren", and offered that its 3D IMAX visuals were phenomenal. The Washington Post declared the film a "critic's pick", and in praising the film's 3D IMAX realism, noted the film wove together the life and studies of Dr. Fred Urquhart and the life cycle of the monarch butterfly from egg to caterpillar to chrysalis to adult insect, adding that it resulted in "an educational but equally engrossing bit of filmmaking" that was "armchair travel at its most engaging". They also favorably compared the film against March of the Penguins for its ability "to tug at heartstrings", and make the viewer feel personally invested in Urquhart's quest. Ottawa Citizen wrote that Fred Urquhart's search of discovery into the life of the monarch butterfly was "a remarkable story" and capturing it made "a stunning documentary that fills the screen."

Slashfilm offered that before major studios recognized the financial potential of IMAX big screens for releases of blockbuster productions, the "theaters primarily played nature and science documentaries". They welcomed the return of such to IMAX theaters through Flight of the Butterflies. And in noting the film's imminent October release, and the number of blockbuster films now being offered in the big-screen 3D format, The Film Stage offered it as a net positive that IMAX theaters will "have a balance of blockbusters and nature films."
