= The Gunpowder Plot: Exploding the Legend =

- Genre: documentary
- Created by: Darlow Smithson Productions, Ltd.
- Directed by: Mike Slee
- Presented by: Richard Hammond
- Theme music composer: Richard Attree
- Country of origin: United Kingdom

Production
- Executive producer: Richard Battin
- Producer: Mike Slee
- Production locations: UK, Spain
- Editor: Ross Bradley
- Camera setup: Lee Butterby; Peter Allibone; Chris Bryant; Mike Craven Todd; Dave Baillie (aerial photography)
- Running time: 104 min.

Original release
- Network: ITV
- Release: 1 November 2005

The Gunpowder Plot: Exploding the Legend is a British television show, hosted by Richard Hammond, that recreated elements of the Gunpowder Plot in which Guy Fawkes attempted to blow up the House of Lords.

First aired on ITV1 on 1 November 2005, this £1 million programme centres on a reconstruction of the Houses of Parliament as they were in 1605 (the current ones had not yet been built at the time of the Gunpowder Plot), constructed using period equivalent methods wherever possible. This was stocked with mannequins to represent notable commoners, members and the king before the bomb was detonated. The programme was made to coincide with the 400th anniversary of the plot.

== Synopsis ==
The programme explores through partial dramatization the plot itself, and the persons involved. It also answers the question of whether the plot would have actually worked: the Houses of Parliament would have been completely obliterated, and most of the windows in nearby Westminster Abbey would have been shattered.

The first hurdle to overcome was the actual recreation of the 17th-century Houses of Parliament. As the buildings were demolished to expand the current structures, Simon Carter, the Parliamentary Curator provided drawings of the original structures for the recreated structure to utilise using 650 tonnes of concrete. Explosives expert Sidney Alford helped to determine that thirty-six barrels containing one cubic ton of gunpowder were used in the plot. Alford further proved that the "decayed" powder was classified as such because it was unsuitable for infantry use, but could still detonate.

The dramatic experiment, conducted on the Advantica-owned Spadeadam test site and overseen by Arup, proved unambiguously that the explosion would have, at the very least, killed all those attending the State Opening of Parliament in the Lords chamber, including, according to historical consultant Justin Pollard, King James I and VI of Scotland, Archbishop Bancroft, Lord Northampton and the philosopher Francis Bacon.

The blast radius indicated in red would have killed everyone within it, while those in the blue-shaded area would likely be harmed by falling debris.

The power of the explosion, which surprised even gunpowder experts, was such that 7-foot-deep (2.1 m) solid concrete walls (made deliberately to replicate how archives suggest the walls in the old House of Lords were constructed) were reduced to rubble. Measuring devices placed in the chamber to calculate the force of the blast were themselves destroyed by it, while the skull of the mannequin representing King James, which had been placed on a throne inside the chamber surrounded by courtiers, peers and bishops, was found far from the site.

According to the findings of the programme, no one within 100 metres of the blast would have survived, and all windows within a large distance of the palace would have been shattered, including the stained-glass windows of Westminster Abbey. The power of the explosion would have been heard at least five miles away, and seen from much further. Even if only half the gunpowder had gone off, everyone in the House of Lords and its environs would have been killed instantly. The blast would have been mostly directed upwards, Arup blasting consultant David Haddon, pointed out, raining debris in a 200-meter radius.

The later part of the programme addressed the contrafactual historical aspects, had the plot actually succeeded. Pollard notes that the conspirators ideally planned to use the bombing to create a Catholic monarchy, with Robert Catesby and the Catholics in power while James's nine-year-old daughter, princess Elizabeth, sat on the throne. Pollard speculates that English history would have therefore more closely resembled that of France, which overthrew its monarchy and became a republic, and that a president would be living in Buckingham Palace today.

However, Pollard points out that, in all likelihood, the result would have been much the same as what actually transpired, with the conspirators caught and executed. Additionally, had the plot succeeded, there would have been a massacre of Catholics, who accounted for 5% of the populace, with the worst-case scenario leading to their complete extermination within England: "In reality, the blast would have sent shockwaves through the Protestant community, bolstering their resolve against the hugely outnumbered Catholics and sparking ruthless revenge." Pollard concludes that the plot was a "stupid" plan, stating that "you can't change the politics of a whole country just by blowing up a few hundred people".

== Cast ==
- Richard Hammond - Host
- Justin Pollard - Historical Consultant

== Historical dramatization ==
- Henry Douthwaite as Guy Fawkes
- Stuart Liddle as King James I
- Matt Rozier as Robert Catesby
- Jonathan Dunstan as Thomas Winteur
- Daniel Hoadley as Thomas Percy
- Toby Knight as John Wright
- Tallulah Boote Bond as Princess Elizabeth
- John Joyce as Father Henry Garnet

== Production ==
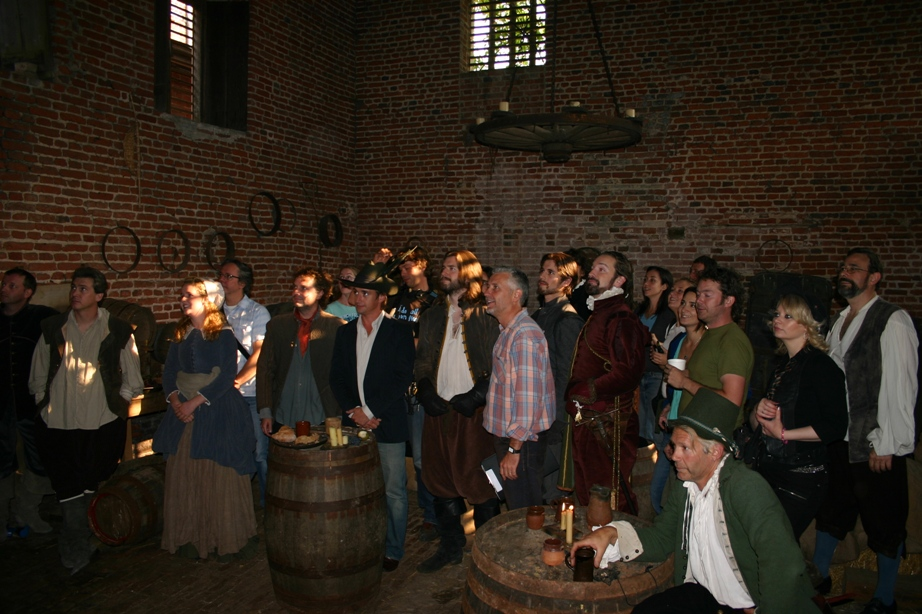
Presenter Richard Hammond and director Mike Slee with the cast and crew, shown during filming of the Tavern scene on location at Kentwell Hall, Suffolk.

When approached with the idea of building a full-size replica of Parliament, stuffing the basement with gunpowder and blowing it up, presenter Richard Hammond considered it a hoax, saying that he "simply did not believe that anyone would be crazy enough to recreate the Gunpowder Plot."

Production of the documentary took six months. While historical research was underway in England, Hammond and explosives expert Sidney Alford had to travel to Spain to buy some gunpowder, as not enough was available in the UK. They were stopped at the French border by customs because, "perhaps unsurprisingly, our expert turned out to be contaminated with traces of just about every form of explosive known to man, triggering a security alert."

The 7 July 2005 London bombings occurred during the programme's production, prompting concerns about the subject matter. Hammond insisted on continuing production, believing that the attacks made the documentary more relevant than ever:

There were those who said we should stop our project, that it was insensitive. I disagreed. This is, after all, the story of a young man who felt persecuted in his country, who travelled abroad to learn how to use explosives and returned prepared to perpetrate an appalling act of terrorism - and if that rings a bell, so it should.

The power of the explosion surprised gunpowder experts.

For the reconstruction of Parliament, production designer Jo Manser was given the task. Manser said the set (to scale as it was in 1605: 11m by 23m and 16m high) required a production crew of 45 people, and cost £200k. The set was built between July and September 2005. AP structural engineers were consulted to assess the equations used building the structure to ensure accuracy and safety. Manser noted the topic of setting off an explosion at Parliament allowed the novelty of blowing up a set compared to conventional disposal methods, saying that the explosion "was a more exciting way to dispose of it."

For the interior filming, fifteen small digital cameras were used, such as the Sony DSR-PD150. For the external shots of the explosion, a slow motion camera was used, not the type typically used in television filming. Advantica used them to study the explosions frame by frame.

== Reception ==
Adam Nicolson of The Guardian wrote in August that the casting of Hammond was "eccentric." Thomas Sutcliffe of The Independent noted with "satisfaction" that the documentary was "irresistible to anyone with a weakness for the delicious combination of immediate spectacle and delayed climax." Sunday Express' Adrian Pettet points out that Gunpowder is "a cross between Mechannibals and Timewatch, it's great fun and there is a bit of proper history smuggled in there too".
