= Ontario Nature =

- Predecessor: Federation of Ontario Naturalists
- Formation: 1931
- Type: Non-profit
- Location: Ontario
- Executive Director: Andrés Jiménez Monge
- Website: ontarionature.org

Ontario Nature (formally the Federation of Ontario Naturalists) is an environmental charity based in Toronto, that promotes the conservation of wild species and spaces in the Canadian province of Ontario. It was established in 1931 as the Federation of Ontario Naturalists and changed its name to Ontario Nature in 2004.

Ontario Nature maintains a system of 26 nature reserves, totaling 3,159 hectares (7,807 acres). Ontario Nature advocates for the creation of parks and other protected areas. It also raises public awareness about nature.

== History ==
On February 17, 1931, J.R. Dymond presented a proposal entitled, “Federation of Ontario Naturalists” to the Brodie Club (the leading naturalist organization in North America at that time). After review and discussion, the Federation of Ontario Naturalists was officially created and given federation status on May 15, 1931 founded by 7 affiliated clubs and 28 individual members. Ontario Nature’s magazine has had different names, frequency, and forms over the years.: ON Nature: 2005 – present, Seasons: 1980 – 2004, The Ontario Naturalist: 1963 – 1979, The Bulletin: 1937 – 1962, Circular: 1932 – 1936

== Areas of Focus ==
- Protect and restore nature to reverse the ongoing trend of biodiversity decline in Ontario.
- Build grassroots capacity and a collective voice for nature conservation with the Nature Network.
- Connect people with nature to help build a commitment to life-long stewardship and nature conservation.

== Nature Network ==
The Nature Network unites 150 dedicated conservation groups from across Ontario. Member groups help Ontario Nature identify and engage with local issues that are provincially significant. Through the network, Ontario Nature shares environmental concerns with communities and supports grassroots conservation.

== Magazine ==
Ontario Nature publishes a quarterly magazine called ON Nature, formerly called Seasons.

Ontario Nature focuses on wild species and wild spaces in Ontario. Its award-winning quarterly magazine, ON Nature, publishes environmental content. Contributors include leading journalists, photographers, and conservation experts. Print and digital subscriptions are available on the Ontario Nature Magazine Site Digital versions of back issues are also available via the ON Nature website.

== Awards ==
ON Nature magazine is an authority on environmental issues.

- Finalist for Short Feature Writing, 2019 National Magazine Awards, “Root of Temptation” by Patricia Hluchy
- Finalist for Short Feature Writing, 2018 National Magazine Awards, “Blinded by the light” by Ray Ford
- Silver for Short Feature Writing, 2017 National Magazine Awards, “The cutting edge” by Ray Ford
- Gold for Photography and Illustration, 2016 Applied Arts, “In the muck with mudpuppies” by Jessica Deeks
- Finalist for Science Technology & the Environment, 2016 National Magazine Awards, "Oil and water” by Conor Mihell
