= Miss Bala (2011 film) =

2011 film

- Cinematic release poster
- Directed by: Gerardo Naranjo
- Written by: Gerardo Naranjo; Mauricio Katz
- Produced by: Pablo Cruz
- Starring: Stephanie Sigman
- Cinematography: Mátyás Erdély
- Edited by: Gerardo Naranjo
- Music by: Emilio Kauderer
- Production companies: Canana Films; Fox International Productions
- Distributed by: Fox International Productions (through 20th Century Fox)
- Release dates: 13 May 2011 (Cannes); 9 September 2011 (Mexico)
- Running time: 113 minutes
- Country: Mexico
- Languages: Spanish; English
- Box office: $427,815

Miss Bala (Spanish for "Miss Bullet") is a 2011 Mexican crime action thriller film written by Gerardo Naranjo with Mauricio Katz and directed by Gerardo Naranjo. The film premiered in the Un Certain Regard section at the 2011 Cannes Film Festival. The film was selected as the Mexican entry for the Best Foreign Language Film at the 84th Academy Awards, but it did not make the final shortlist. An American remake was made in 2019.

== Plot ==
23-year-old Laura Guerrero (Sigman) lives with her father Ramón (Javier Zaragoza) and little brother Arturo (Juan Carlos Galván). Laura and her friend Suzu (Lakshmi Picazo) both enter the competition for the Miss Baja beauty pageant. They go to the Millennium Night Club, where Suzu meets her boyfriend Javi (Hugo Márquez). However, when Laura goes into the bathroom, she witnesses members of the La Estrella gang causing chaos by shooting and killing a number of DEA officers and nightclub-goers. Frantic, she tries to search for Suzu, and as a result fails to show up for the early rehearsal for the pageant and is ejected from the competition.

She is then kidnapped by the leader of the La Estrella gang, Lino (Noé Hernández), and the gang also kidnap her brother and father as bargaining chips to control her. Laura is used by the gang for criminal missions, including transporting drug money across the US border, and luring out a DEA agent who has infiltrated the organization (José Yenque).

The climax of the film occurs after Laura wins the Miss Baja contest; she attempts to escape, but is recovered and later raped. The gang uses her to seduce a prominent military general (Miguel Courtrier); but she switches sides when she learns that Suzu had been a casualty in the nightclub shooting. She manages to survive the ensuing shoot-out, but is captured by the military, beaten, and paraded as a member of the gang. Laura is taken away by the police and dropped off at an undisclosed location.

== Cast ==
- Stephanie Sigman as Laura Guerrero
- Irene Azuela as Jessica Berlanga
- Miguel Couturier as General Salomón Duarte
- Gabriel Heads as Agent Bell
- Noé Hernández as Lino Valdez
- James Russo as Jimmy
- Lakshmi Picazo as Suzu
- Jose Yenque as Kike Cámara

== Real life incident ==
Miss Bala is loosely based on a real incident, in which 2008's Miss Sinaloa, Laura Zúñiga, was arrested with suspected gang members in a truck filled with munitions outside Guadalajara, Jalisco. In an interview with Complex Magazine, director Gerardo Naranjo said that he had met Zúñiga, but that "I really didn’t want to go into their psyches. I guess the film has a very strong point-of-view, and we refuse to get into the minds of these guys, because I think that’s what every other movie does… I wanted to live the experience from the point-of-view of an innocent person."

== Reception ==
On its release at the 2011 Cannes Film Festival, Miss Bala received praise from critics. On review aggregator Rotten Tomatoes, the film holds an approval rating of 88% based on 68 reviews, with an average rating of 7.2/10. The website's critical consensus reads, "Miss Bala's subject is loaded enough, but the frantic and muscular filmmaking puts this movie in a whole new league." At Metacritic, which assigns a weighted mean rating to reviews, the film has an average score of 79 out of 100, based on 24 critics, indicating "generally favorable reviews".

== Remake ==
In 2017, it was announced Catherine Hardwicke would direct a remake of the film, from a screenplay by Gareth Dunnet-Alcocer, starring Gina Rodriguez, Ismael Cruz Córdova, and Anthony Mackie. It was released on 1 February 2019, by Columbia Pictures.

== See also ==
- List of submissions to the 84th Academy Awards for Best Foreign Language Film
- List of Mexican submissions for the Academy Award for Best Foreign Language Film
