= Kenneth C. Brugger =

American naturalist

- Born: 16 June 1918; Kenosha, Wisconsin
- Died: 25 November 1998 (aged 80); Austin, Texas
- Known for: Research on monarch butterflies

Kenneth C. Brugger (16 June 1918 – 25 November 1998) was an American naturalist and self-taught textile engineer. He is noted for discovering, with his wife Catalina Trail, the location of the overwintering sites of the monarch butterfly, Danaus plexippus.

== Life and career ==
Brugger was born 16 June 1918 in Kenosha, Wisconsin. He never attended college but had strong mechanical aptitude and mathematical skills. He worked as a mechanic in his father's garage until World War II, when he worked in the cryptology section of the U. S. Signal Corps. After the war he went to work for Jockey International and rose to the position of chief engineer for Jockey's worldwide knitting operations. He designed innovative knitting machines, including a compactor that minimized shrinkage in knitted underwear. Following a divorce in 1965 he moved to Mexico to work as a textile consultant.

== Monarch research ==
In 1972 Brugger was working in Mexico City. An amateur naturalist, he responded to a notice in a local newspaper written by Fred and Norah Urquhart, Canadian zoologists who were studying the migration patterns of monarch butterflies. The Urquharts had tracked the migration route as far as Texas, where it disappeared, and they thought it might continue into Mexico, so they were seeking volunteers to look for the butterflies.

In 1973, after seeing the ad, Brugger convinced Catalina Aguado to search for the butterflies with him. They searched for several years, first as volunteers, then as paid assistants to the Urquharts. In 1974 he married Catalina Aguado, a fellow butterfly lover. On 2 January 1975, they finally found a mountaintop forest containing millions of resting monarch butterflies. Their discovery was reported as the cover story in National Geographic magazine in August 1976. Eventually a dozen such sites were located and were protected by the Mexican government as ecological reserves. The area is now a World Heritage Site known as the Monarch Butterfly Biosphere Reserve. The sites are popular with ecotourists who admire the beauty of the massed butterflies. Ironically, Brugger could not appreciate that beauty; he was totally colorblind.

Brugger and Catalina Aguado (who later remarried and became known as Catalina Trail) separated in 1991 and eventually divorced; they had one son.

== Recognition ==
Brugger's search and discovery is dramatized in the IMAX film Flight of the Butterflies.
