= Fred and Norah Urquhart =

Canadian entomologist

Fred Urquhart CM
- Born: Frederick Albert Urquhart; December 13, 1911; Toronto, Canada
- Died: November 3, 2002 (aged 90); Pickering, Ontario, Canada
- Education: University of Toronto
- Known for: Research on monarch butterflies
- Spouse: Norah Roden (Patterson) Urquhart
- Awards: Order of Canada
- Scientific career
- Fields: Zoology, Entomology
- Workplaces: University of Toronto; Royal Ontario Museum
- Thesis: (1949)

Norah Roden Urquhart CM
- Born: Norah Roden Patterson; June 23, 1918
- Died: March 13, 2009 (aged 90); Pickering, Ontario, Canada
- Occupation: Zoologist
- Known for: Research on monarch butterflies
- Spouse: Frederick Albert Urquhart
- Awards: Order of Canada

Frederick Albert Urquhart CM (December 13, 1911 – November 3, 2002) was a Canadian zoologist and professor of zoology who studied the migration of monarch butterflies, Danaus plexippus L. Together with his wife, Norah Roden Urquhart CM, he identified their migration routes, discovered that the migration spans multiple generations of butterflies, and found their wintering place in Mexico—considered "one of the greatest natural history discoveries" of the 20th century.

== Early life ==
Urquhart was born in Toronto, Canada. He attended the University of Toronto, graduating in 1935 with a degree in biology. He received the Bensley Fellowship for his graduate studies in entomology, receiving an MA in 1937 and a Ph.D. in 1940. During World War II he taught meteorology to students in the Royal Canadian Air Force. On July 21, 1945, he married Norah Roden Patterson. She became his full collaborator in butterfly research, although she did not have a Ph.D.

== Career ==
Following the war in 1945, he began work as the assistant director of zoology at the Royal Ontario Museum. He also began working as a part-time assistant professor of zoology at the University of Toronto in 1948, while still working for the museum. In 1949, he was promoted to the position of the director of zoology and paleontology at the Royal Ontario Museum. He became a full-time associate professor of zoology at the University of Toronto in 1961, moving up to a full professor in 1963.

In 1966 he helped to organize and teach the zoology program at Scarborough College, now the University of Toronto Scarborough. He was a popular lecturer and produced a highly successful television lecture series.

He wrote four books, a monograph, and 62 papers in peer-reviewed journals, as well as numerous scientific reports and popular articles. His best known books are The Monarch Butterfly (University of Toronto Press, 1960) and The Monarch Butterfly: International Traveler (University of Toronto Press, 1987). He retired in 1977.

== Monarch research ==
Urquhart's research on the route and destination of the insects started in 1937 and lasted for 38 years. Working with his wife Norah, he tracked the trails of the butterflies by tagging the wings of thousands of individual butterflies. They founded the first Insect Migration Association, today known as Monarch Watch, and recruited hundreds of volunteers or "citizen scientists" who helped in their research by tagging butterflies and reporting findings and sightings. The Urquharts raised thousands of monarchs at their home in Scarborough, Ontario, as well as using the facilities of the University of Toronto to analyze their findings and do research.

The Urquharts identified several distinct migration routes but were baffled why the trail seemed to disappear in Texas in the late fall, only to reappear in the spring. They sought help in Mexico and recruited a pair of naturalists to search for the butterflies. On January 9, 1975, Kenneth C. Brugger and his wife Catalina Trail (then known as Cathy Aguado) finally located the first known wintering refuge for the butterflies on a mountaintop in Michoacán, Mexico, more than 4,000 kilometers from the starting point of their migration.

In 1976, the Urquharts traveled to Mexico to view the long-sought wintering site for themselves. His article "Discovered: The Monarch's Mexican Haven" was published in National Geographic magazine in August 1976, and featured a cover photograph of Trail covered with butterflies. A dozen such sites are now known in Mexico; they are protected as ecological preserves by the Mexican government. The area is now a World Heritage Site known as the Monarch Butterfly Biosphere Reserve. Current conservation efforts are aimed at protecting monarchs in their breeding areas in the US and Canada.

Among other discoveries, the Urquharts learned that the butterflies only travel in daylight and can fly up to 130 kilometres (81 mi) in a day. The trip north spans several generations of monarchs, while a much-longer-lived "super generation" flies from the northern reaches of the butterfly's range all the way to Mexico, overwinters there, and breeds in the spring to start the next generation flying north.

== Professional affiliations ==
Urquhart helped found the Federation of Ontario Naturalists in the 1940s. The Urquharts founded the Insect Migration Association.

== Recognition ==
- On May 6, 1998, Fred and Norah Urquhart were both appointed Member of the Order of Canada (CM).
- Fred and Norah Urquhart received the W.W.H. Gunn award presented by the Federation of Ontario Naturalists.
- He was a fellow of the Royal Entomological Society.
- The Urquhart Butterfly Garden in Dundas, Ontario is a 3-acre park designed to attract butterflies. Named after Fred and Norah and created in 1994, it was the first municipal butterfly garden in Canada.
- An IMAX film, Flight of the Butterflies, tells the story of the long search by the Urquharts, Brugger, and Trail to unlock the secret of the butterflies' migration.

== Personal life ==
Fred Urquhart died in 2002 at the age of 90 in Pickering, Ontario. Norah died on March 13, 2009, also in Pickering and also at age 90.

== Select publications ==
=== Books ===
- The Monarch Butterfly. Toronto: University of Toronto Press, 1960.
- The Monarch Butterfly: International Traveler. Toronto: University of Toronto Press, 1987.

=== Journal articles ===
- "Found at Last: The Monarch's Winter Home". National Geographic, August 1976.
