= Catalina Trail =

Mexican naturalist

- Born: 1949; Michoacán, Mexico
- Other names: Cathy Aguado
- Occupation: Social worker
- Known for: Discovering wintering site of monarch butterflies

Catalina Trail (née Aguado, previously known as Cathy Brugger) is a Mexican-born naturalist and social worker. She is noted for discovering, with her then-husband Kenneth C. Brugger, the location of the overwintering sites of the monarch butterfly, Danaus plexippus. Their find completed the story of the monarchs' migration, which has been described as "the entomological discovery of the 20th century."

She was born in 1949 on a ranch in the mountains near El Salto, in the Mexican state of Michoacán. As a child she loved to observe nature and read books about science. When she was 11 she moved with her family to the state capital, Morelia, and by age 17 she was living and working in Mexico City. She loved adventure, exploring Mexico, Canada, the United States and Central America alone or with friends. When she was 21 a Canadian friend introduced her to Brugger, a 53-year-old textile engineer and amateur naturalist.

In 1972 Brugger showed her a notice in a local newspaper written by Fred and Norah Urquhart, Canadian entomologists who had been studying the migration patterns of monarch butterflies since 1937. They suspected the monarchs spent the winter in Mexico and were looking for volunteers to hunt for the butterflies there. Brugger searched for several years, first as a volunteer, then as a paid assistant to the Urquharts. Brugger convinced Trail to join him in the search, and for several years they roamed the country on weekends in his Winnebago, searching for the monarchs. They married in 1974.

Following clues that pointed toward Michoacán, they hiked the mountains by day and spent the nights in the Winnebago. Finally on January 2, 1975, they found a summit called Cerro Pelón where the trees and even the ground were covered with millions of resting butterflies. Trail was 25 at the time. On January 9 they called the Urquharts to report their find. In early 1976 the Urquharts themselves came to visit the site they had sought for decades.

The discovery was reported in National Geographic magazine in August 1976. The magazine cover featured a picture of Trail covered in butterflies.

Eventually a dozen such sites were located and were protected by the Mexican government as ecological reserves. The area is now a World Heritage Site known as the Monarch Butterfly Biosphere Reserve. The sites are popular with ecotourists who admire the beauty of the massed butterflies.

Trail and Brugger's search for the butterflies is dramatized in the IMAX film Flight of the Butterflies. Trail returned to the roosting site in February 2012 as the guest of the filmmakers.

Trail and Brugger later moved to Austin, Texas. They separated in 1991 and eventually divorced, after 18 years of marriage and one son. She attended Austin Community College and later the University of Texas at Austin, earning a degree in social work in 1996. In 1995 she married fellow social worker George Trail. She worked as a case manager for an Austin nonprofit organization until her retirement. She now tends her garden and occasionally appears at events promoting the conservation of monarchs and other pollinating insects. "I'm not a scientist," she says. "I'm a gardener that likes insects."

In 2012 the State of Mexico presented her with its “Jose Maria Luis Mora” Gold Medal Award to recognize her “relevant and eminent merits and conduct of notable service to humanity, Mexico, and The State of Mexico.”
