= 9th federal electoral district of the State of Mexico =

Federal electoral district of Mexico

State of Mexico's 9th
- Electoral district of the Chamber of Deputies of Mexico

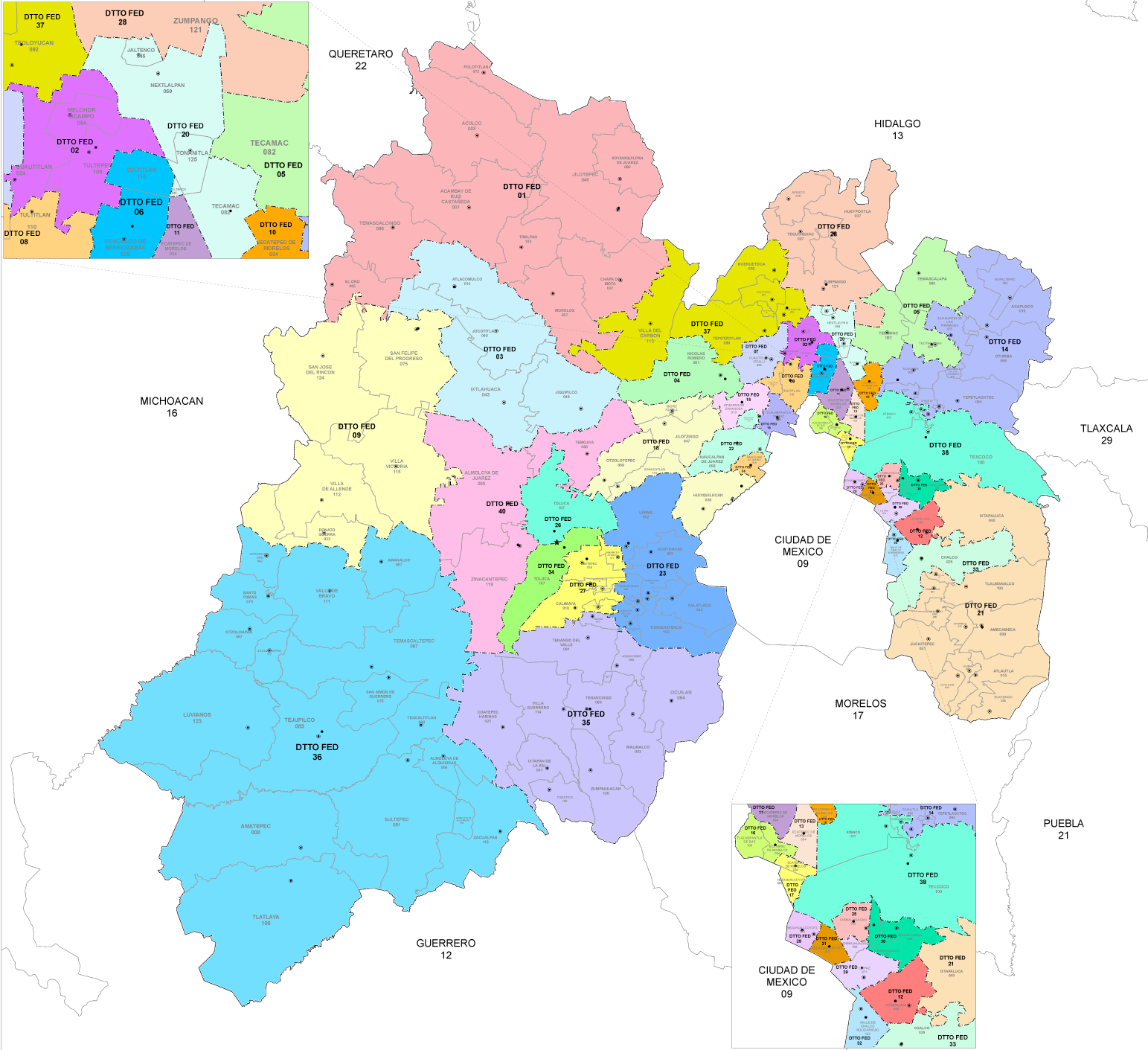
- State of Mexico's districts since 2023

Incumbent
- Member: Iván Marín Rangel
- Party: ▌Ecologist Green Party
- Congress: 66th (2024–2027)

District
- State: State of Mexico
- Head town: San Felipe del Progreso
- Coordinates: 19°42′N 99°57′W
- Covers: Donato Guerra, San Felipe del Progreso, San José del Rincón, Villa de Allende, Villa Victoria
- PR region: Fifth
- Precincts: 178
- Population: 443,541 (2020 census)
- Indigenous: Yes (63%)

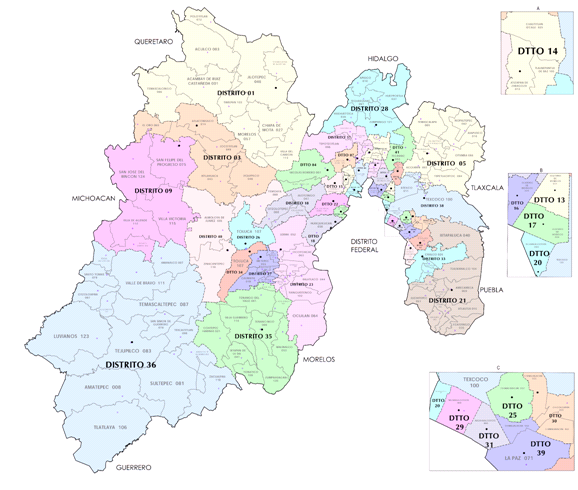
2017–2022 districting scheme

The 9th federal electoral district of the State of Mexico (Spanish: Distrito electoral federal 09 del Estado de México) is one of the 300 electoral districts into which Mexico is divided for elections to the federal Chamber of Deputies and one of 40 such districts in the State of Mexico.

It elects one deputy to the lower house of Congress for each three-year legislative session by means of the first-past-the-post system. Votes cast in the district also count towards the calculation of proportional representation ("plurinominal") deputies elected from the fifth region.

The current member for the district, elected in the 2024 general election, is Iván Marín Rangel. Originally elected for the National Regeneration Movement (Morena), he switched to the Ecologist Green Party of Mexico (PVEM) at the start of the congressional session.

== District territory ==
Under the 2023 districting plan adopted by the National Electoral Institute (INE), which is to be used for the 2024, 2027 and 2030 federal elections, the 9th district covers 178 electoral precincts (secciones electorales) across five municipalities in the west of the state, on the border with Michoacán:

- Donato Guerra, San Felipe del Progreso, San José del Rincón, Villa de Allende and Villa Victoria.

The head town (cabecera distrital), where results from individual polling stations are gathered together and tallied, is the city of San Felipe del Progreso.

The district reported a population of 443,541 in the 2020 census. With Indigenous and Afrodescendent inhabitants accounting for over 63% of that number, the 9th district is classified by the INE as an indigenous district. (Note: Population figure indicates total inhabitants, not voters. The INE deems any local or federal electoral district where Indigenous or Afrodescendent inhabitants number 40% or more of the total to be an indigenous district.)

== Previous districting schemes ==
Evolution of electoral district numbers
	1974	1978	1996	2005	2017	2023
State of Mexico	15	34	36	40	41	40
Chamber of Deputies	196	300				

Under the previous districting plans enacted by the INE and its predecessors, the 9th district was situated as follows:

2017–2022

The same group of municipalities as in the 2023 plan: Donato Guerra, San Felipe del Progreso, San José del Rincón, Villa de Allende and Villa Victoria. The head town was at San Felipe del Progreso.

2005–2017

The municipalities of Ixtlahuaca, Otzolotepec, San Felipe del Progreso and Temoaya. The head town was at Ixtlahuaca de Rayón.

1996–2005

The municipalities of Almoloya de Juárez, Isidro Fabela, Ixtlahuaca, Jiquipilco and Temoaya. The head town was at Ixtlahuaca de Rayón.

1978–1996

A portion of the municipality of Nezahualcóyotl.

== Deputies returned to Congress ==
(Mexico) National parties
- Current
- PAN
- PRI
- PT
- PVEM
- MC
- Morena
- PAZ
- Somos
- Defunct or local only
- PLM
- PNR
- PRM
- PNM
- PP
- PPS
- PARM
- PFCRN
- CON
- PANAL
- PSD
- PES
- PES
- PRD

State of Mexico's 9th district
Election	Deputy	Party	Term	Legislature
1916	Jesús Fuentes Dávila		1916–1917	Constituent Congress of Querétaro
...
1943	Gabriel Ramos Millán	Institutional Revolutionary Party	1943–1946	39th Congress
. . .
1979	Eugenio Rosales Gutiérrez	Institutional Revolutionary Party	1979–1982	51st Congress
1982	Moisés Raúl López Láines	Institutional Revolutionary Party	1982–1985	52nd Congress
1985	Jesús Alcántara Miranda	Institutional Revolutionary Party	1985–1988	53rd Congress
1988	Rafael Pedro Caray Cornejo	Institutional Revolutionary Party	1988–1991	54th Congress
1991	Moisés Armenta Vega	Institutional Revolutionary Party	1991–1994	55th Congress
1994	Aurelio Salinas Ortiz	Institutional Revolutionary Party	1994–1997	56th Congress
1997	Sergio Valdés Arias	Institutional Revolutionary Party	1997–2000	57th Congress
2000	Ismael Estrada Colín	Institutional Revolutionary Party	2000–2003	58th Congress
2003	Blanca Estela Gómez Carmona	Institutional Revolutionary Party	2003–2006	59th Congress
2006	Elda Gómez Lugo	Institutional Revolutionary Party	2006–2009	60th Congress
2009	Eduardo Zarzosa Sánchez	Institutional Revolutionary Party	2009–2012	61st Congress
2012	José Manzur Quiroga	Institutional Revolutionary Party	2012–2015	62nd Congress
2015	Dora Elena Real Salinas	Institutional Revolutionary Party	2015–2018	63rd Congress
2018	Eduardo Zarzosa Sánchez; Jesús Wenceslao Rangel de la O (Note: Rangel de la O was sworn in as the alternate on 16 February 2021.)	Institutional Revolutionary Party	2018–2021; 2021	64th Congress
2021	Eduardo Zarzosa Sánchez	Institutional Revolutionary Party	2021–2024	65th Congress
2024	Iván Marín Rangel (Note: Originally elected for Morena, Marín Rangel switched to the PVEM at the start of the congressional session.)	National Regeneration Movement Ecologist Green Party of Mexico	2024–2027	66th Congress

== Presidential elections ==
State of Mexico's 9th district
Election	District won by	Party or coalition	%
2018	Andrés Manuel López Obrador	Juntos Haremos Historia	36.9727
2024	Claudia Sheinbaum Pardo	Sigamos Haciendo Historia	58.4870
