= Altamira =

Altamira may refer to:

== People ==
- Altamira (surname)

== Places ==
- Cave of Altamira, a cave in Cantabria, Spain famous for its paintings and carving
- Altamira, Pará, a city in the Brazilian state of Pará
- Altamira, Huila, a town and municipality in Colombia
- Altamira, Puerto Plata, a town in the Dominican Republic
- Altamira Municipality, Tamaulipas, Mexico, a port city and a municipality
- Altamira (Caracas) a neighborhood in Caracas, Venezuela
- Altamira do Maranhão, a city in the Brazilian state of Maranhão
- A neighbourhood in the district of Basurto-Zorroza in Bilbao, Spain
- 7742 Altamira, an asteroid

== In business ==
- Altamira Financial Services, a Canadian mutual fund company now part of National Bank of Canada
- AltaMira Press, an imprint of Rowman & Littlefield Publishing Group
- Altamira Software, a computer software developer acquired by Microsoft in 1994

== Others ==
- Altamira (film), a 2016 film by Hugh Hudson
  - Altamira (album), a 2016 soundtrack album of the film by Mark Knopfler and Evelyn Glennie
- Altamira oriole, Icterus gularis, a New World oriole
- Altamira yellowthroat, Geothlypis flavovelata, a New World warbler
- Viscounty of Altamira, Spanish nobility
- Marquisate of Altamira, Spanish nobility
- "Alta Mira", a song by Edgar Winter on their LP They Only Come Out at Night, 1972

== See also ==
- Altamirano (disambiguation)
- Altamiranoa
- Altamura (disambiguation)
