= Altamirano =

Altamirano may refer to:

== Places ==
=== In Argentina ===
- Altamirano, Buenos Aires

== In Mexico ==
- Altamirano Municipality, Chiapas
- Altamirano, Chiapas, a town and the municipal seat of the above
- Altamirano, Chihuahua
- Altamirano (Rancho Altamirano), Chihuahua
- Altamirano, Guanajuato
- Altamirano, Quintana Roo
- Altamirano, Tamaulipas
- Ciudad Altamirano, Guerrero
- Ciudad Altamirano, Michoacán
- Manlio Fabio Altamirano, Veracruz, also called Altamirano
- San Agustín Altamirano, Mexico State, also called Altamirano

== Other uses ==
- Altamirano (surname)
