= Elda (disambiguation) =

Elda is a city in the province of Alicante, Spain.

Elda may also refer to:

== People ==
- Elda Cerrato (born 1930), Argentine artist
- Elda Cividino (1921–2014), Italian gymnast
- Elda Dessel (1925–2010), Argentine actress
- Elda Emma Anderson (1899–1961), American physicist and health researcher
- Elda Ferri, Italian film producer
- Elda Furry (1885–1966), American gossip columnist and actress
- Elda Gómez Lugo (born 1941), Mexican politician
- Elda Grin (1928–2016), Armenian writer, psychologist, professor, and legal expert
- Elda Neyis Mosquera (born 1963), Colombian commander
- Elda Panopoulou (born 1960s), Greek comedian
- Elda Peralta (born 1932), Mexican film actress
- Elda Pértile (born 1953), Argentine politician
- Elda Pucci (1928—2005), Italian politician and professor
- Elda Tattoli (1929–2005), Italian actress and film director
- Elda Vokel (1911–2001), American stage and motion picture actress

== Groups ==
- European Lighting Designers' Association (ELDA+), an international association of architectural lighting designers
- CBF Elda, a Spanish women's handball team

== Other uses ==
- Chi (Chobits), also known as Elda, a fictional character in the manga and anime series Chobits
- MV Elda, a Greek refrigerated coaster in service from 1967 to 1970
