= Altamura (disambiguation) =

Altamura is a city and commune in southern Italy.

It may also refer to:

- Altamura Island, in the Gulf of California, Mexico
- Altamura Cathedral
- Pane di Altamura, a type of bread made from the Altamura area
- A.S.D. Leonessa Altamura, an Italian association football club
- Altamura Man, a partially preserved fossil of the genus Homo, found near Altamura

== People ==
- Altamura Painter, a classical Greek vase painter
- Elio Altamura, an Italian art director
- Francesco Saverio Altamura (1822–1897), an Italian painter
- Giovanni Pipino di Altamura (died 1357), Italian nobleman
- Tullio Altamura (born 18 July 1924), an Italian film actor

== See also ==
- Altamurana, a breed of sheep named after the town of Altamura
- Altamira (disambiguation)
