= Eduardo Zarzosa Sánchez =

Mexican politician

- Born: 16 December 1973 (age 52); San Felipe del Progreso, State of Mexico, Mexico
- Occupation: Politician
- Political party: PRI

Eduardo Zarzosa Sánchez (Note: In this Mexican name, the surname is Zarzosa and the second or maternal family name is Sánchez.) (born 16 December 1973) is a Mexican politician from the Institutional Revolutionary Party (PRI).

A native of San Felipe del Progreso in the State of Mexico, he served as the municipality's president in 2006 to 2009.

He has been elected to the Chamber of Deputies for the State of Mexico's 9th district on three occasions: in the 2009 mid-terms, in the 2018 general election, and in the 2021 mid-terms.

In the 2024 state election, Zarzosa Sánchez was elected to a proportional-representation seat in the Congress of the State of Mexico.
