= Kingdom of Castile =

Christian kingdom in Iberia (1065–1833)

Kingdom of Castile Reino de Castilla (Spanish) Regnum Castellae (Latin)
- 1065–1833
- Coat of arms

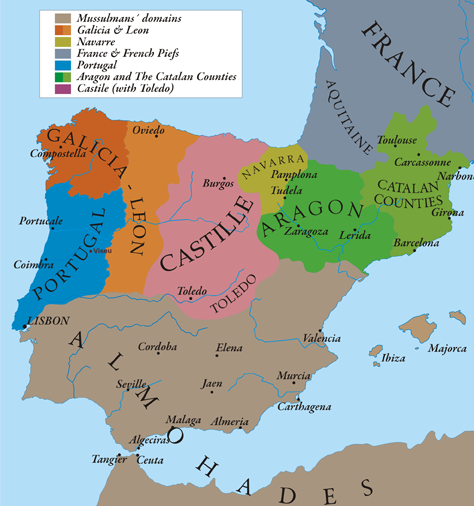
- The Kingdom of Castile in 1210.
- Status: Independent kingdom (1065–1230); Realm of the Crown of Castile (1230–1715); Realm of Spain (1715–1833)
- Capital: No settled capital (Note: Burgos, Valladolid and Toledo were centres of royal authority of the Kingdom and the later Crown of Castile.)
- Common languages: Spanish, Basque, Mozarabic, Andalusian Arabic
- Religion: Roman Catholicism (state religion), Judaism and Islam
- Government: Feudal monarchy (1065–1230)
- King
  - 1065–1072: Sancho II (first)
  - 1217–1230: Ferdinand III (last)
- Historical era: Middle Ages
  - Established: 1065
  - Permanent union of Castile and León: 23 September 1230
  - 1833 territorial division of Spain: 1833
Preceded by	Succeeded by
Kingdom of León	Spain
- Today part of: Spain

The Kingdom of Castile (Note: /kæˈstiːl/; Spanish: Reino de Castilla: Latin: Regnum Castellae) was a polity in the Iberian Peninsula during the Middle Ages. It traces its origins to the 9th-century County of Castile, (Note: Spanish: Condado de Castilla, Latin: Comitatus Castellae) as an eastern frontier lordship of the Kingdom of León. During the 10th century, the Castilian counts increased their autonomy, but it was not until 1065 that it was separated from the Kingdom of León and became a kingdom in its own right. Between 1072 and 1157, it was again united with León, and after 1230, the union became permanent.

Throughout that period, the Castilian kings made extensive conquests in southern Iberia at the expense of the Islamic principalities. The Kingdoms of Castile and of León, with their southern acquisitions, came to be known collectively as the Crown of Castile, a term that also came to encompass overseas expansion.

== History ==
=== 9th to 11th centuries: beginnings ===
According to the chronicles of Alfonso III of Asturias, the first reference to the name "Castile" (Castilla) can be found in a document written during AD 800. In the Al-Andalus chronicles from the Cordoban Caliphate, the oldest sources refer to it as Al-Qila, or "the castled" high plains past the territory of Alava, further south than it and the first encountered in their expeditions from Zaragoza. The name reflects its origin as a march on the eastern frontier of the Kingdom of Asturias, protected by castles, towers, or castra, in a territory formerly called Bardulia.

The County of Castile, bordered in the south by the northern reaches of the Spanish Sistema Central mountain system, was just north of modern-day Madrid province. It was re-populated by inhabitants of Cantabria, Asturias, Vasconia and Visigothic and Mozarab origins. It had its own Romance dialect and customary laws.

From the first half of the 9th century until the middle of the century, in which it came to be paid more attention, it was administered and defended by the monarchs of Leon, due to the increased incursions from the Emirate of Córdoba. Its first repopulation settlements were led by small abbots and local counts from the other side of the Cantabrian ridge neighbor valleys, Trasmiera and Primorias and smaller ones, from the contiguous maritime valleys of Mena and Encartaciones in nearby Biscay; some of those settlers had abandoned those exposed areas of the Meseta a few decades earlier, and taken refuge in the much denser and more intractable woods of the Atlantic valleys, so they were not that foreign to them.

A mix of settlers from the Cantabrian and Basque coastal areas, which were recently swelled with refugees, was led under the protection of Abbot Vitulus and his brother, Count Herwig, as registered in the local charters they signed around the first years of the 800s. The areas that they settled did not extend far from the Cantabrian southeastern ridges, and not beyond the southern reaches of the high Ebro river valleys and canyon gores.

The first count of a wider and more united Castile was Rodrigo in 850, under Ordoño I of Asturias and Alfonso III of Asturias. He settled and fortified the ancient Cantabrian hill town of Amaya, west and south of the Ebro river, which offered an easier defense from the Muslim military expeditions and command of the main highway, still functional from the Roman Empire, passing by, south of the Cantabrian ridge all the way to Leon. Subsequently, the region was subdivided, separate counts being named to Alava, Burgos, Cerezo & Lantarón, and a reduced Castile. In 931 the county was reunified by Count Fernán González, who rose in rebellion against the Kingdom of León, successor state to Asturias, and achieved an autonomous status, allowing the county to be inherited by his family instead of being subject to appointment by the Leonese king.

=== 11th and 12th centuries: expansion and union with the Kingdom of León ===
County of Castile (Castilla) in 1037

The minority of Count García Sánchez led Castile to accept Sancho III of Navarre, married to the sister of Count García, as feudal overlord. García was assassinated in 1028 while in León to marry the princess Sancha, sister of Bermudo III of León. Sancho III, acting as feudal overlord, appointed his younger son (García's nephew) Ferdinand as Count of Castile, marrying him to his uncle's intended bride, Sancha of León. Following Sancho's death in 1035, Castile returned to the nominal control of León, but Ferdinand, allying himself with his brother García Sánchez III of Navarre, began a war with his brother-in-law Vermudo. At the Battle of Tamarón Vermudo was killed, leaving no surviving heirs. In right of his wife, Ferdinand then assumed the royal title as king of León and Castile, for the first time associating the royal title with the rule of Castile.

When Ferdinand I died in 1065, the territories were divided among his children. Sancho II became King of Castile, Alfonso VI, King of León and García, King of Galicia, while his daughters were given towns: Urraca was given Zamora, and Elvira was given Toro.

Sancho II allied himself with Alfonso VI of León and together they conquered, then divided, Galicia. Sancho later attacked Alfonso VI and invaded León with the help of El Cid, and drove his brother into exile, thereby reuniting the three kingdoms. Urraca permitted the greater part of the Leonese army to take refuge in the town of Zamora. Sancho laid siege to the town, but the Castilian king was assassinated in 1072 by Bellido Dolfos, a Galician nobleman. The Castilian troops then withdrew.

As a result, Alfonso VI recovered all his original territory of León, and became the king of Castile and Galicia. This was the second union of León and Castile, although the two kingdoms remained distinct entities joined only in a personal union.

During the first years of the 12th century, Sancho, the only son of Alfonso VI, died, leaving only his daughter. Because of this, Alfonso VI took a different approach from other European kingdoms, including France. He gave his daughters, Elvira, Urraca, and Theresa in marriage to Raymond of Toulouse, Raymond of Burgundy, and Henry of Burgundy respectively. In the Council of Burgos in 1080 the traditional Mozarabic rite was replaced by the Roman one. Upon his death, Alfonso VI was succeeded by his daughter, the widowed Urraca, who then married Alfonso I of Aragon, but they almost immediately fell out. Alfonso tried unsuccessfully to conquer Urraca's lands, before he repudiated her in 1114. Urraca also had to contend with attempts by her son from her first marriage, the king of Galicia, to assert his rights. When Urraca died, this son became king of León and Castile as Alfonso VII. During his reign, Alfonso VII managed to annex parts of the weaker kingdoms of Navarre and Aragón which fought to secede after the death of Alfonso I of Aragon. Alfonso VII refused his right to conquer the Mediterranean coast for the new union of Aragón with the County of Barcelona (Petronila and Ramón Berenguer IV).

=== 12th century: a link between Christianity and Islam ===
The centuries of Moorish rule had established Castile's high central plateau as a vast sheep pasturage; the fact that the greater part of Spanish sheep-rearing terminology was derived from Arabic underscores the debt.

The 8th and 9th centuries were preceded by a period of Umayyad conquests, as Arabs took control of previously Hellenized areas such as Egypt and Syria in the 7th century. It was at this point they first encountered Greek ideas, though from the beginning, many Arabs were hostile to classical learning. Because of this hostility, the religious Caliphs could not support scientific translations. Translators had to seek out wealthy business patrons rather than religious ones. Until Abbasid rule in the 8th century, however, there was little work in translation. Most knowledge of Greek during Umayyad rule was gained from scholars of Greek who remained from the Byzantine period, rather than through widespread translation and dissemination of texts. A few scholars argue that translation was more widespread than is thought during this period, but this remains the minority view.

The main period of translation was during Abbasid rule. The 2nd Abbasid Caliph Al-Mansur moved the capital from Damascus to Baghdad. Here he founded a great library, containing Greek Classical texts. Al-Mansur ordered this collection of world literature translated into Arabic. Under al-Mansur, and by his orders, translations were made from Greek, Syriac, and Persian. The Syriac and Persian books themselves were translations from Greek or Sanskrit. A legacy of the 6th century King of Persia, Anushirvan (Chosroes I) the Just was the introduction of many Greek ideas into his kingdom. Aided by this knowledge and the juxtaposition of beliefs, the Abbasids considered it valuable to look at Islam with Greek eyes, and to look at the Greeks with Islamic eyes. Abbasid philosophers also advanced the idea that Islam had, from the very beginning, stressed the gathering of knowledge as a key part of the religion. These new ideas enabled the amassing and translation of Greek concepts to disseminate like never before.

During the 12th century, Europe enjoyed great advances in intellectual achievements, sparked in part by the kingdom of Castile's conquest of the great cultural center of Toledo (1085). There Arabic classics were discovered, and contacts established with the knowledge and works of Muslim scientists. In the first half of the century a translation program, called the "School of Toledo", translated many philosophical and scientific works from the Classical Greek and the Islamic worlds into Latin. Many European scholars, including Daniel of Morley and Gerard of Cremona, travelled to Toledo to gain further knowledge.

The Way of St. James further enhanced the cultural exchange between the kingdoms of Castile and León and the rest of Europe.

The 12th century saw the establishment of many new religious orders, like the rest of Europe, such as Calatrava, Alcántara and Santiago; and the foundation of many Cistercian abbeys.

=== 13th century: definitive union with the Kingdom of León ===
Alfonso VII restored the royal tradition of dividing his kingdom among his children. Sancho III became King of Castile and Ferdinand II, King of León.

The rivalry between both kingdoms continued until 1230 when Ferdinand III of Castile received the Kingdom of León from his father Alfonso IX, having previously received the Kingdom of Castile from his mother Berenguela of Castile in 1217. In addition, he took advantage of the decline of the Almohad empire to conquer the Guadalquivir Valley whilst his son Alfonso X took the taifa of Murcia.

The Courts from León and Castile merged, an event considered as the foundation of the Crown of Castile, consisting of the kingdoms of Castile, León, taifas and other domains conquered from the Moors, including the taifa of Córdoba, taifa of Murcia, taifa of Jaén and taifa of Seville.

=== 14th and 15th centuries: the House of Trastámara ===
Evolution of the Crown of Castile through the years

The House of Trastámara was a lineage that ruled Castile from 1369 to 1504, Aragón from 1412 to 1516, Navarre from 1425 to 1479, and Naples from 1442 to 1501.

Its name was taken from the Count (or Duke) of Trastámara. This title was used by Henry II of Castile, of the Mercedes, before coming to the throne in 1369, during the civil war with his legitimate brother, King Peter of Castile. John II of Aragón ruled from 1458 to 1479 and upon his death, his daughter became Queen Eleanor of Navarre and his son became King Ferdinand II of Aragon.

==== Union of the Crowns of Castile and Aragon ====
The marriage of Ferdinand II of Aragon and Isabella I of Castile, in 1469 at the Palacio de los Vivero in Valladolid began the familial union of the two kingdoms. They became known as the Catholic Monarchs (los Reyes Católicos). Isabella succeeded her brother as Queen of Castile, and Ferdinand became jure uxoris King of Castile in 1474. When Ferdinand succeeded his father as King of Aragon in 1479, the Crown of Castile and the various territories of the Crown of Aragon were united in a personal union, creating for the first time since the 8th century a single political unit, referred to as España (Spain). "Los Reyes Católicos" started policies that diminished the power of the bourgeoisie and nobility in Castile, and greatly reduced the powers of the Cortes (General Courts) to the point where they became rubber-stamps for the monarch's acts. They also brought the nobility to their side. In 1492, the Kingdom of Castile conquered the last Moorish state of Granada, thereby ending Muslim rule in Iberia and completing the Reconquista.

=== 16th century ===
On Isabella's death in 1504 her daughter, Joanna I, became Queen (in name) with her husband Philip I as King (in authority). After his death Joanna's father was regent, due to her perceived mental illness, as her son Charles I was only six years old. On Ferdinand II's death in 1516, Charles I was proclaimed as king of Castile and of Aragon (in authority) jointly with his mother Joanna I as the Queen of Castile (in name). As the first monarch to reign over Castile and Aragon, Charles I may be considered as the first operational King of Spain. Charles I also became Charles V of the Holy Roman Empire in 1519.

== Government: municipal councils and parliaments ==
As with all medieval kingdoms, supreme power was understood to reside in the monarch "by the grace of God", as the legal formula explained. Nevertheless, rural and urban communities began to form assemblies to issue regulations to deal with everyday problems. Over time, these assemblies evolved into municipal councils, known as variously as ayuntamientos or cabildos, in which some of the inhabitants, the property-owning heads of households (vecinos), represented the rest. By the 14th century these councils had gained more powers, such as the right to elect municipal magistrates and officers (alcaldes, speakers, clerks, etc.) and representatives to the parliaments (Cortes).

Due to the increasing power of the municipal councils and the need for communication between these and the King, cortes were established in the Kingdom of León in 1188, and in Castile in 1250. Unlike other kingdoms, Castile didn't have a permanent capital (neither did Spain until the 16th century), so the cortes were celebrated in whichever city the king chose to stay. In the earliest Leonese and Castilian Cortes, the inhabitants of the cities (known as "laboratores") formed a small group of the representatives and had no legislative powers, but they were a link between the king and the general population, something that was pioneered by the kingdoms of Castile and León. Eventually the representatives of the cities gained the right to vote in the Cortes, often allying with the monarchs against the great noble lords.

== Arms of the Kingdom of Castile ==
During the reign of Alfonso VIII, the king began to use the canting arms of Castile as its emblem, in its blazons and banners, which were gules, a three towered castle or masoned sable and ajouré azure.

Coat of Arms of the King of Castile, 1171–1214

Coat of arms of the King of Castile, 1214–30

Coat of Arms of the King of Castile and León (1230–84)

Coat of Arms of the King of Castile and León (1284–1390)

Coat of Arms of King Henry III of Castile (1390–1406)

Arms of the King of Castile and León (design of 15th century)

Arms with the Royal Crest (1366–1406)

Coat of arms with supporters (1406–74)

== See also ==
- Council of Castile
- Crown of Castile
- Heraldry of Castile
- List of Castilian monarchs
- History of Spain
- List of Castilian battles
- List of Castilian counts
