= Janos Municipality =

Municipality in the Mexican state of Chihuahua

Janos
- Municipality
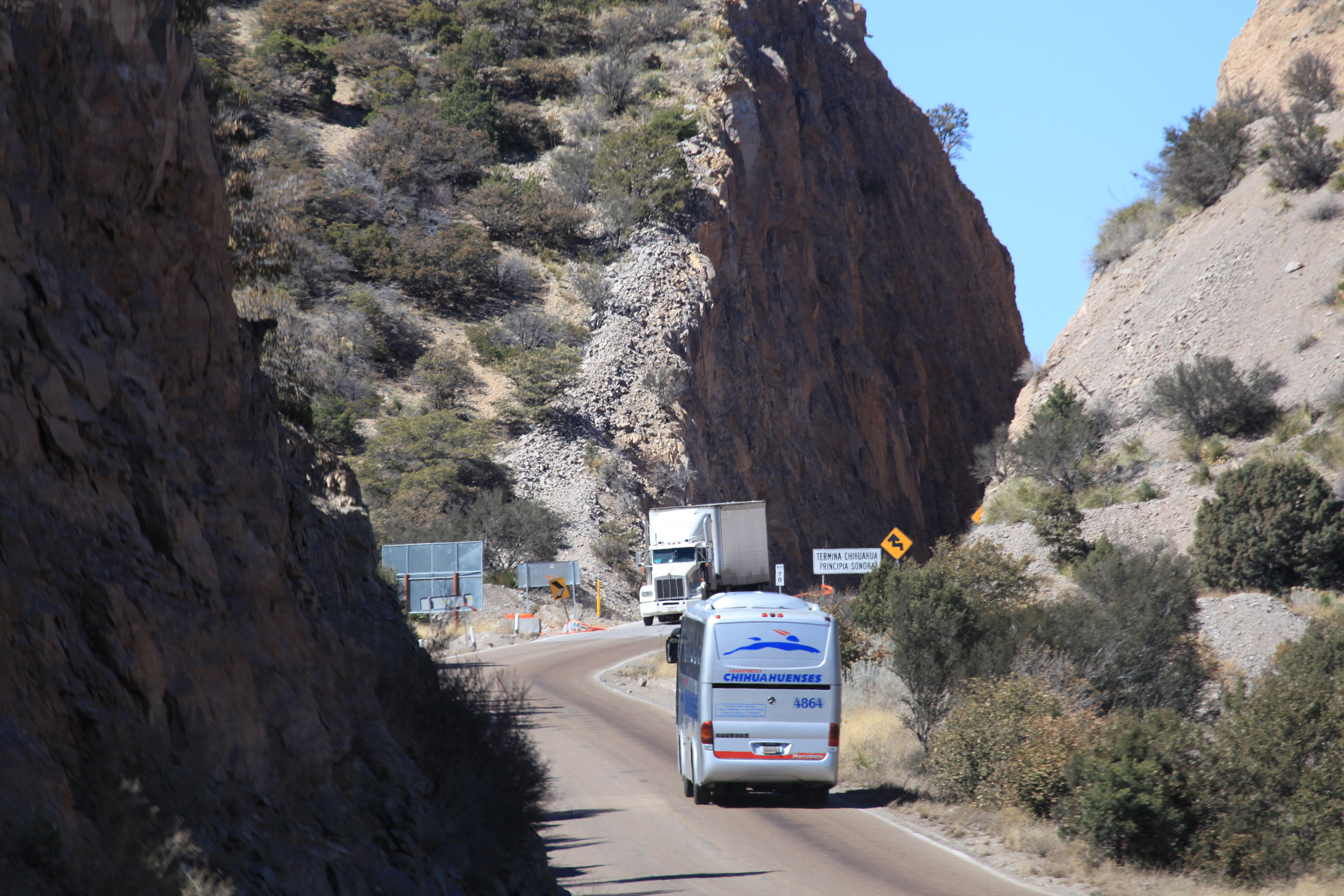
- Motto(s): Primero México, Después México, Siempre México (First Mexico, Then Mexico, Always Mexico)
- Location of Janos in Chihuahua

- Janos
- Coordinates: 30°53′16″N 108°11′24″W
- Country: Mexico
- State: Chihuahua
- Municipality: Janos
- Mission established: 1640
- Presidio established: 1686
- Municipality created: 1820
- Founder: Franciscan missionaries
- Named for: Janos people

Government
  - Municipal President: Leonel Molina García (PRI)

Area (municipality)
  - Total: 6,930.50 km^{2} (2,675.88 sq mi)
- Elevation: 1,369 m (4,491 ft)

Population (2010)
  - Total: 10,953
- Postal code: 31840
- Area code: 636
- Website: http://www.janos.gob.mx

Janos is a municipality in the Mexican state of Chihuahua. It is located in the extreme northwest of Chihuahua, on the border with the state of Sonora and the U.S. states of Arizona and New Mexico. As of 2010, the municipality had a total population of 10,953. The municipal seat is the town of Janos, Chihuahua, which shares its name with the municipality.

The El Berrendo/Antelope Wells border crossing is located in the municipality.

As of 2010, the town of Janos had a population of 2,738. Other than the town of Janos, the municipality had 315 localities, the largest of which (with 2010 populations in parentheses) was: Monte Verde (Altamira) (1,087), classified as rural.

The name "Janos" was given by the Janos people, the indigenous inhabitants of the area upon the arrival of the Spaniards. The Janos were probably a sub-tribe or closely related to the Suma people. Neither the Janos nor the Suma survived contact and are now extinct. Franciscan missionaries originally built a mission in the location in 1640, under the name Soledad de Janos. The mission did not, however, survive a series of revolts by indigenous people and was replaced on 16 October 1686 by a military presidio under Gen. Juan Fernández de la Fuente. The presidio defended the area from attacks from Apache raiders until the municipality was established in 1820.

== Towns and villages ==
The largest localities (cities, towns, and villages) are:

Name	2010 Census Population
Janos	2,738
Monte Verde (Altamira)	1,087
Fernández Leal	885
Pancho Villa (La Morita)	812
Tres Álamos	670
Casa de Janos	399
San Pedro	336
Buenos Aires (Campo Uno)	275
Altamirano	255
Buenos Aires (Campo Cuatro)	213
Total Municipality	10,953

Other settlements:

- El Berrendo (1)

== Adjacent municipalities and counties ==
- Ascensión Municipality - east
- Nuevo Casas Grandes Municipality - southeast
- Casas Grandes Municipality - south
- Bacerac Municipality, Sonora - southwest
- Bavispe Municipality, Sonora - west
- Agua Prieta Municipality, Sonora - west
- Hidalgo County, New Mexico - north

== Sister City ==
Janos Municipality has one sister city.:

- (United States) - Lordsburg, New Mexico, USA
