= El Berrendo, Chihuahua =

Coordinates: 31°19′54″N 108°31′55″W

El Berrendo is a town in the Mexican state of Chihuahua, located in Janos Municipality, directly across the U.S. border from Antelope Wells, New Mexico. According to the Population Census and Housing of 2010 from INEGI, there was only 1 inhabitant.

Geographically, it is found in the middle of the Chihuahua Desert. Its altitude is 1,420 meters (4,659 ft) above sea level.

It is the smallest border crossing on the entire US-Mexico Border. There is a Point of Entry on the U.S. side only, open 7 days a week from 8 AM to 4 PM to non-commercial traffic only.

Its name is the Spanish word for the hooved mammal typical of the region, the pronghorn, which is like an antelope, the origin for its neighboring settlement, Antelope Wells.

El Berrendo can be reached from Federal Highway 2, via a 12 km road, which was paved for most of its length as of 2017. On the American side, it is reached by New Mexico State Route 81, which connects Antelope Wells to Interstate 10.
