= San José del Rincón =

- Municipality
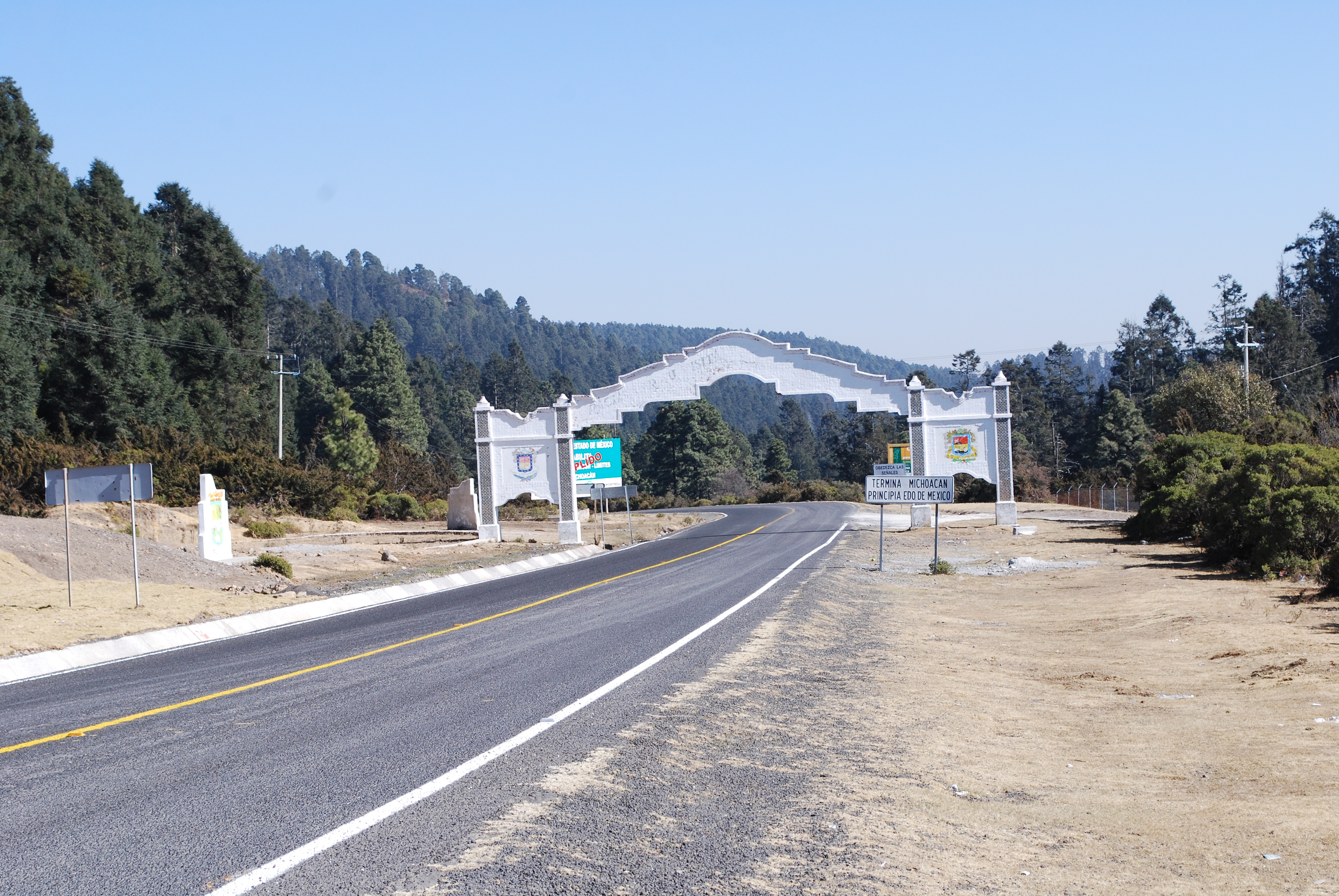
- Arch on the Angangueo–San José del Rincón highway at the Michoacán–Mexico state border

- Coat of arms

- Location in Mexico San José del Rincón (State of Mexico)
- Coordinates: 19°39′38″N 100°09′09″W
- Country: Mexico
- State: (State of Mexico) Mexico
- Established: 2002
- Seat: San José del Rincón Centro

Government
  - President: Jesús Rolando Rangel Espinosa

Area
  - Total: 489 km^{2} (189 sq mi)
- Elevation (of seat): 2,747 m (9,012 ft)

Population (2010 Census)
  - Total: 91,345
  - Estimate (2015 Intercensal Survey): 93,878
  - Density: 187/km^{2} (484/sq mi)
  - Seat: 1,638
- Time zone: UTC-6 (Central)
- Postal code of seat: 50660
- Area code: 712
- Demonym: Montero
- Website: Official website

San José del Rincón is a municipality in the State of Mexico. Its inhabitants are referred to as monteros.

== Geography ==
San José del Rincón is located in the western part of the State of Mexico on its border with Michoacán. From north to south, it borders the municipalities of El Oro, San Felipe del Progreso, Villa Victoria and Villa de Allende in the State of Mexico, and the municipalities of Tlalpujahua, Senguío, Angangueo, Ocampo and Zitácuaro in Michoacán. The municipality covers an area of 489 square kilometres (189 sq mi). The highest point in the municipality is the Cerro de Cabrero in the south, at 3,260 metres (10,700 ft) above sea level.

The northern part of the municipality lies within the Lerma River basin, while the southern part lies in the Cutzamala River sub-basin of the Balsas River system, and is drained by the Arroyo Grande which flows southeast into Villa Victoria Reservoir, which is part of Mexico City's water supply.

Forests cover 30.7% of San José del Rincón and are mostly located in the mountainous western part of the municipality, where the predominant trees are oyamel and pine. These forests are protected as part of the Monarch Butterfly Biosphere Reserve. The rest of the land in the municipality is mainly used for agriculture and livestock grazing. Soils in the municipality are mostly andosols with isolated areas of planosols in the northeast and cambisols in the east.

The climate is temperate sub-humid with rainy summers. Average temperatures range between 12 and 18 degrees Celsius. Frost can occur between December and March; February and March bring winds and dust. More than 100 mm of rain falls in each of the months from June to September.

== History ==
The municipality of San José del Rincón was created by government decree on 2 October 2001, which went into force on 1 January 2002. Its territory previously comprised the western part of the municipality of San Felipe del Progreso.

== Administration ==
Municipal elections are held every three years. The current president of the municipality is Jesús Rolando Rangel Espinosa of the PRI.

== Demographics ==
In the 2010 Mexican Census, the municipality of San José del Rincón recorded a population of 91,345 inhabitants living in 17,707 households. Its annual growth rate of 2.7% was the highest in the State of Mexico. It recorded a population of 93,878 inhabitants in the 2015 Intercensal Survey.

There are 137 localities in the municipality, three of which are classified as urban:

- San José del Rincón Centro, which recorded a population of 1635 inhabitants in the 2010 Census and serves as the municipal headquarters;
- Guarda de la Lagunita, also known as Las Canoas, which had 2543 inhabitants in 2010; and
- San Miguel Agua Bendita, which had 2500 inhabitants in 2010.

In the 2015 Intercensal Survey, 89.67% of people in the municipality identified themselves as indigenous. In the 2010 Census, 11,191 people or 12% of the population in San José del Rincón reported speaking an indigenous language, of which 10,916 spoke Mazahua.

== Economy ==
San José del Rincón is one of the poorest municipalities in the State of Mexico. Its main economic activities are agriculture, animal husbandry, commerce and handicrafts.
