= José Manzur Quiroga =

Mexican politician (born 1955)

- Born: 25 January 1955 (age 71); State of Mexico, Mexico
- Occupation: Deputy
- Political party: PRI

José Sergio Manzur Quiroga (born 25 January 1955) is a Mexican politician affiliated with the Institutional Revolutionary Party (PRI). In the 2012 general election he was elected to the Chamber of Deputies to represent the State of Mexico's 9th district during the 62nd session of Congress.

== Biography ==
José Manzur Quiroga was born on 25 January 1955, in Aculco, State of Mexico. He's a Certified Public Accountant and a Lawyer. Since 1976 Manzur has been affiliated to the Institutional Revolutionary Party. A year after José Manzur was affiliated to the Institutional Revolutionary Party, he was named the leader of the Revolutionary Youth Movement; on 1986 he became organizational secretary in the Municipal Committee of the Party; on 1987 he became district chief on Ixtapan de la Sal and on 1988 special chief in Huixquilucan.

On 2012 he went elected as Federal Deputy. During his management many projects were presented to the Mexican Congress, like the Organic Law of Federal Public Administration, with which the public security, Federal police and Federal penitentiary system tasks were transferred to the Ministry of the Interior. On 22 May 2014, he became part of the Cabinet of the Government of the State of Mexico, head of the General Secretariat of State Government.
