= Viscounty of Altamira =

The Viscounts of Altamira were a family of the Spanish nobility.

== Genealogy ==
=== First Generation ===
- D. Juan de Bivero

- Married Dª María de Soto
- Their Children were:

=== Second Generation ===
- D. Pedro de Bivero.
- Mayor Pérez de Vivero

- Married Gonzalo Pérez de Vaamonde. :* They had three sons

- D. Alonso Pérez de Vivero

- Born in the parish of San Esteban de Valle (currently part of the Council of O Vicedo - Lugo)
- Married Dª Inés de Guzmán

- Widow of the Count of Trastamara
- Daughter of Gil Gómez Davila, Lord of Cespedosa y de Puente del Congosto, and of Dª Aldonza de Guzmán

- Alonso's father died when he was very young and his mother raised him as an Hidalgo
- At the age of 15 he marched to Castilla and became a page for D. Álvaro de Luna, Constable of Castile, Grand Master of the military order of Santiago, and favorite of King John II of Castile
- Later in life he assumed the roles of Secretary and Contador Mayor of the King
- Lord of Villajuán y Fuensaldaña
- Created in Valladolid the Palacio de los Vivero - where the Royal Foreign Ministry and the Territorial Audience where located
- Created the Castle of Fuensaldaña, near by Valladolid, where his crest lies; On a golden background, 3 plants of ivy in their natural colour, each with 7 leaves, mounted over rocks out at sea, and blue and white waves.
- From him descended the Viscounts of Altamira, the Counts of Fuensaldaña, the Counts of Grajal, the Marquises of Alcañices, and other illustrious families that bear the name (V)Bivero
- Alonso and Inés founded the mayorazgo (entailed estate) 2 December 1452

- They had three children:

=== Third Generation ===
1. Gonzalo de Vivero. He was Chaplain of St. Mary's Cathedral in Lugo, and was Prelado alongside don García Martínez Vaamonde, he was later elevated to Bishop of Salamanca in 1446. He died on 29 January 1480.
2. Vasco Pérez de Vivero. Captain for King D. Fernando y Dª. Isabel. In 1497 he was Mayor of the Fortress of A Coruña.
3. D. Juan de Bivero. First born. 1st Viscount of Altamira. The title was bestowed upon him in 1467 by the King Henry IV of Castile.

He married 14 April 1456 to Dª. María de Acuña. Daughter of D. Pedro de Acuña, 1st Count of Buendía, and Ines Herrera. Nephew of the Archbishop of Toledo, D. Alonso Carrillo.

He held the seat of the Biveros, until, on 15 June 1465, King Henry IV stripped him of his title, by Royal Decree signed in Zamora. Henry IV then gave the seat of the Biveros to Perdo Pardo de Cela on 27 June. He was Contador of Henry IV, Commandor General, Lord of Cabezón, in Valladolid. They had the following children;

4. D. Gil González de Vivero y Davila 5. D. Lope 6. D. Francisco 7. D. Alonso de Vivero 8. Dª Aldonza de Vivero. Married to D. Gabriel Manrique. First Count of Osorno 9. Dª María de Vivero y Soto. Casó con D. Luis de Tobar. Señor de Berlanga y Astudillo 10. Dª Isabel de Vivero 11. Dª Inés de Vivero. Married to D. Diego Pérez de Osorio, Lord of Villacís and Cervantes. After the death of his father, the king, he was given the seat of the Biveros. The Biveros were not in agreement with this, and they took up arms and fought within the walls of the estate, killing one son of Dª. Inés in the battle.

From this marriage came the Counts of Villanueva de Cañedo.

This battle forced the King to revoke the Decree of Zamora, signed in 1465, and attributed the seat of the Biveros back to its original Lords.

12. Dª Mariana 13. Dª Catalina de Vivero

=== Fourth Generation ===
Alonso Pérez de Bivero (1458 - 1509). Second Viscount of Altamira. Promoter of the construction of the Castle of Fuensaldaña (Valladolid).

Was married in first instance to Elvira Bazán. In second instance, María Manrique de Benavides. They had the following children; Juana de Acuña. Married to Martín de Acuña. Son of Juan de Acuña, III Count of Valencia, Gijón y Pravia y Teresa Enríquez. Lord of Matadion. They had three children.

=== Fifth Generation ===
1. Juan Pérez de Bivero. 3rd Viscount of Altamira. 2. Antonio de Acuña. Lord of Matadión. With succession. 3. Fernando de Acuña. Lord of Villafañe. With succession. 4. Antonia de Acuña. Married to Fernando Niño de Castro. Marques of Valladolid. 5. Ines de Acuña.

=== Sixth Generation ===
Alonso Pérez de Bivero. IV Viscount of Altamira. Married to María de Mercado. From Madrigal de las Altas Torres (Ávila). Daughter of Juan de Mercado, from Madrigal, Knight of the Order of Santiago. They were succeeded by:

=== Seventh Generation ===
Juan de Bivero y Mercado. V Vizconde of Altamira. King Felipe II bestowed upon him the title of Count of Fuensaldaña. Married to Magdalena de Borja. Lady of the House of Loyola. Nephew of Francis Borgia. They had no children.

Their successors were: D. Juan Esteban Pérez de Bivero Garcia de Quevedo, of the branch of D. Gil González de Bivero Y Davila (Counts of Davila). VI Viscount of Altamira. In the year 1583 he was the 2nd count of Count of Fuensaldaña. His titles were then inherited by D. Alonso Pérez de Bivero Garcia de Quevedo, that continues on the line today.
