= Real Audiencia y Chancillería de Valladolid =

Judicial body in 1371 of the Crown Castile

Coordinates: 41°39′23″N 4°43′14″W

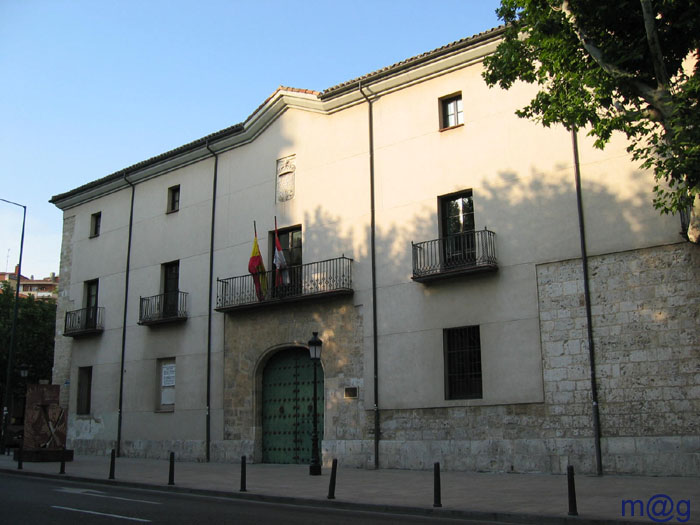
Palacio de los Vivero, building in which the Catholic Monarchs installed the Real Audiencia y Chancillería de Valladolid at the end of 15th-century.

The Royal Audiencia and Chancellería of Valladolid was a judicial body established by Henry II of Castile in 1371, with jurisdiction over the entire territory of the Crown of Castile, except for the characteristics of the Hall of Justice (also called Mil y Quinientas) of the Council of Castile. The building was originally called El Palacio de los Vivero.

It was based in the city of Valladolid and operated for much of the Middle Ages and throughout the Early Modern Ages as the highest court of law in the kingdom, and was suppressed in 1834 as a result of liberal reforms.

In 1494, it lost part of its jurisdiction to the newly created Real Audiencia y Chancillería de Ciudad Real, which was itself soon transferred to Granada, with the creation of the Real Chancillería de Granada in 1505.

== Antecedents ==
Henry II established an Audiencia to administer justice at the request of the Cortes of Toro, convened in 1371 by the king himself. The Audiencia consisted of eight oidores (or jueces letrados, "learned judges"), two prelates and the chancellors of justice, who were in charge of sealing documents. (Compare with the British Lord Chancellor.) John I of Castile applied the term chancillería (a court of last resort, not to be confused with a chancellery), in 1387 to these audiencias. By this time, the Valladolid Chancillería had come to consist of a governor (or regent), sixteen oidores (or "civil-case judges"), three alcaldes del crimen, grouped into four civil chambers, one criminal and one for cases among hidalgos and nobles. The rulings of the Chancillería were irrevocable, although a very serious case could be reviewed by the Council of Castile.

Among the chambers, there was the Sala de Vizcaya ("chamber of Biscay"), which was an appellate court for people of Biscay, considered born hidalgos under the Fuero law of Biscay, no matter where in the Crown of Castile they were. Since several of the Biscayans could only testify in Biscayan Basque, the chamber required the officers taking evidences to understand the language.

== Seats ==
During it first years, the Chancillería had a nomadic existence, just like the royal court. The Valladolid audiencia originated in the residence of the audiencia which was established in Valladolid by the Cortes of Valladolid (1442 and 1447). It was during the reign of the Catholic Monarchs, Isabella I and Ferdinand V, that its permanent seat in Valladolid was confirmed by the 1489 Ordinances of Medina del Campo. Later, Isabella and Ferdinand established two districts: one north of the Tagus River under the jurisdiction of the Valladolid audiencia, and one south of the river under the audiencia of Granada. After the sixteenth century, other audiencias were created to administer justice in the many territories that came under the dominion of the Crown.

For a short period from 1601 to 1605, the Valladolid Audiencia sat in Medina del Campo, when the royal court moved to Valladolid. The Audiencia later moved into the Palace of the Four Towers (today the Captaincy General) in Burgos for a mere nine months between 1605 and 1606. After this, it returned to Valladolid when the royal court moved to Madrid. The Audiencia thereafter remained in Valladolid until 1834, when it was abolished.

== Palacio de los Viveros ==
The official residence of the Audiencia was the Palace of the Viveros. This was originally constructed in the mid-fifteenth century as a fortified palace for Alonso Pérez de Vivero, Contador mayor ("chief treasurer") of John II. In one of its great halls, the Sala Rica, the Catholic Monarchs, Isabella and Ferdinand, were married on October 19, 1469. Their marriage united the Crowns of Aragon and Castile.

When it was the property of the Viveros, the palace had towers, a wall, a moat and a keep. These were torn down on the orders of the Catholic Monarchs in 1475 to avoid their use in a rebellion against the monarchy. When the Vivero family lost possession of the palace, the Crown adapted it for the Chancellería and carried out other renovations including the central cloister.

== See also ==
- Audiencia
