= Ismael Estrada Colín =

Mexican politician

- Born: 19 July 1953 (age 72); Almoloya de Juárez, State of Mexico, Mexico
- Occupation: Politician
- Political party: PRI

Ismael Estrada Colín (born 19 July 1953) is a Mexican politician from the Institutional Revolutionary Party (PRI). In the 2000 general election he was elected to the Chamber of Deputies to represent the State of Mexico's 9th district during the 58th session of Congress. He had previously served in the Congress of the State of Mexico from 1997 to 2000.
