= Altamura Island =

Island in Sinaloa, Mexico

Native name: Isla Altamura (or Isla de Altamura)
- Location within Sinaloa Location within Mexico

Geography
- Location: Pacific Ocean
- Coordinates: 24°53′00″N 108°08′00″W
- Adjacent to: Ocean
- Area: 101.17 km^{2} (39.06 sq mi)

Administration
- Mexico
- Sinaloa

Altamura Island (Spanish: Isla Altamura or de Altamura) is an island of Mexico, in the Gulf of California. It is located in the bahía de Santa María, on the west coast of the state of Sinaloa, southwest of Saliaca Island, separated by an area of shallow water. It is located 70 kilometers (43 mi) west of Culiacán. Its area is 101.17 square kilometers (39.06 sq mi), and it is approximately 40 kilometers (25 mi) long, while its width ranges from 900 meters (3,000 ft) to 3.7 kilometers (2.3 mi). It is one of the largest private islands in the world.

It is a barrier island with open beaches and large sand dunes. In the southern part there are intertidal zones made of silt, clay, sand and gravel; in the remaining part of the island there is coastline, as well as large dunes of sand in the northwestern part.

It is part of the bahía de Santa María complex, and there is a great variety of marine life, migratory birds and even whales.

== History ==
The current name of the island occurs for the first time inside Mexico newspaper El Siglo Diez y Nueve dated November, 9th 1854 and, in particular, inside a geographical account given by an unknown correspondent based in Guyamas:

To conclude this article, I mention the beautiful island of Altamura, located between the mouths of the Culiacan rivers and the Mocrilo stream, an island that does not appear in any of the maps of Mexico that my hands have been able to reach so far. I also noticed the same omission in the nautical charts of this part of the coast of our territory, despite Altamura being the largest island of the Tres Marías [the three islands of Bahìa de Santa Maria] and also of those of Socorro, which are also part of Mexico, even if unhabited. The island of Altamura is rich in fine woods, drinking water and pastures: some cattle farms in the Culiacan district have populated it with their livestock. Guaymas, 27 September 1854

— El Siglo Diez y Nueve, p. 3

From the account given by the unknown correspondent, it can be inferred that as of September, 27th 1854 the island didn't appear in any of the maps examined.

A few hypotheses have recently been suggested about the origin of the island's name. In an ancient map dated 1579 by Abraham Ortelius occurs the name Atamirato, which might be a pre-existing name given by the Indigenous people of Mexico, or one derived from Altamira, which was also common as a surname of nobles. This name allegedly became Altamura, which is formally identical to that of the city of Altamura, Italy, a fact partially explained by the presence in the greater local area of Italian missionaries in the 17th century and 18th century. The work Bibliothecae Dominicanae (1677) by Italian Dominican Ambrogio del Giudice (nicknamed "Altamura") may also have played a role in the current name of the island, with the book providing some accounts of the local area.

== Bibliography ==
- "Estudios Geographicos – Rio de Piastla". El Siglo Diez y Nueve: 3. 9 November 1854.
- Antonio García Cubas. Diccionario geográfico, histórico y biográfico de los Estados Unidos Mexicanos (PDF). Vol. Tomo I (ALC-ALT). National Institute of Statistics and Geography.
- Fabrizio Berloco (2024). "Isla Altamura – Sulle (possibili) origini storiche di un toponimo". InStoria (196). ISSN 1974-028X.
- Fabrizio Berloco (2024). "Navigando verso l'Isla Altamura - Un tesoro nascosto in Messico". Free Magazine - Periodico di approfondimento e informazione locale di Altamura, Matera e Gravina (in Italian) (211 – Nov. Dic. 2024).
