= Quechquemitl =

Indigenous garment from Mexico

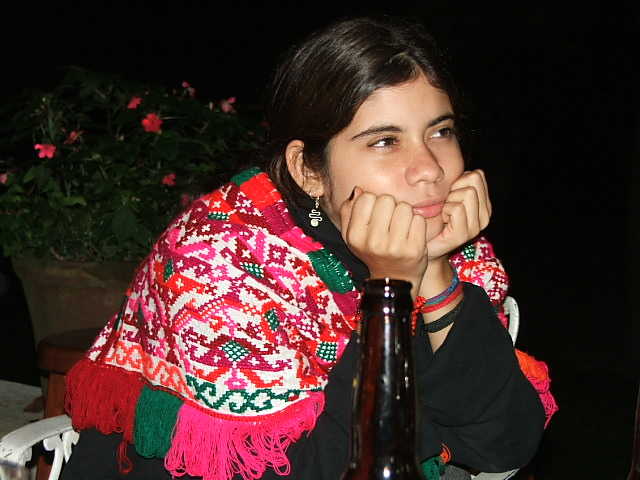
Quezquémetl from the Huasteca Potosina, identifiable for its colours

The quechquemitl (also spelled quezquemitl) is a garment which has been worn by certain indigenous ethnicities in Mexico since the pre-Hispanic period. It usually consists of two pieces of rectangular cloth, often woven by hand, which is sewn together to form a poncho or shawl like garment, which is usually worn hanging off the shoulders. It can be constructed of various different fabrics, often with intricate weaves, and is typically highly decorated, most often with embroidery.

In the pre-Hispanic period only women of high social rank were allowed to wear the quechquemitl. Since the colonial period, it has been adopted by various peoples, mostly living in central Mexico, for everyday wear, festival and rituals, but its use has declined.

== Construction and use ==
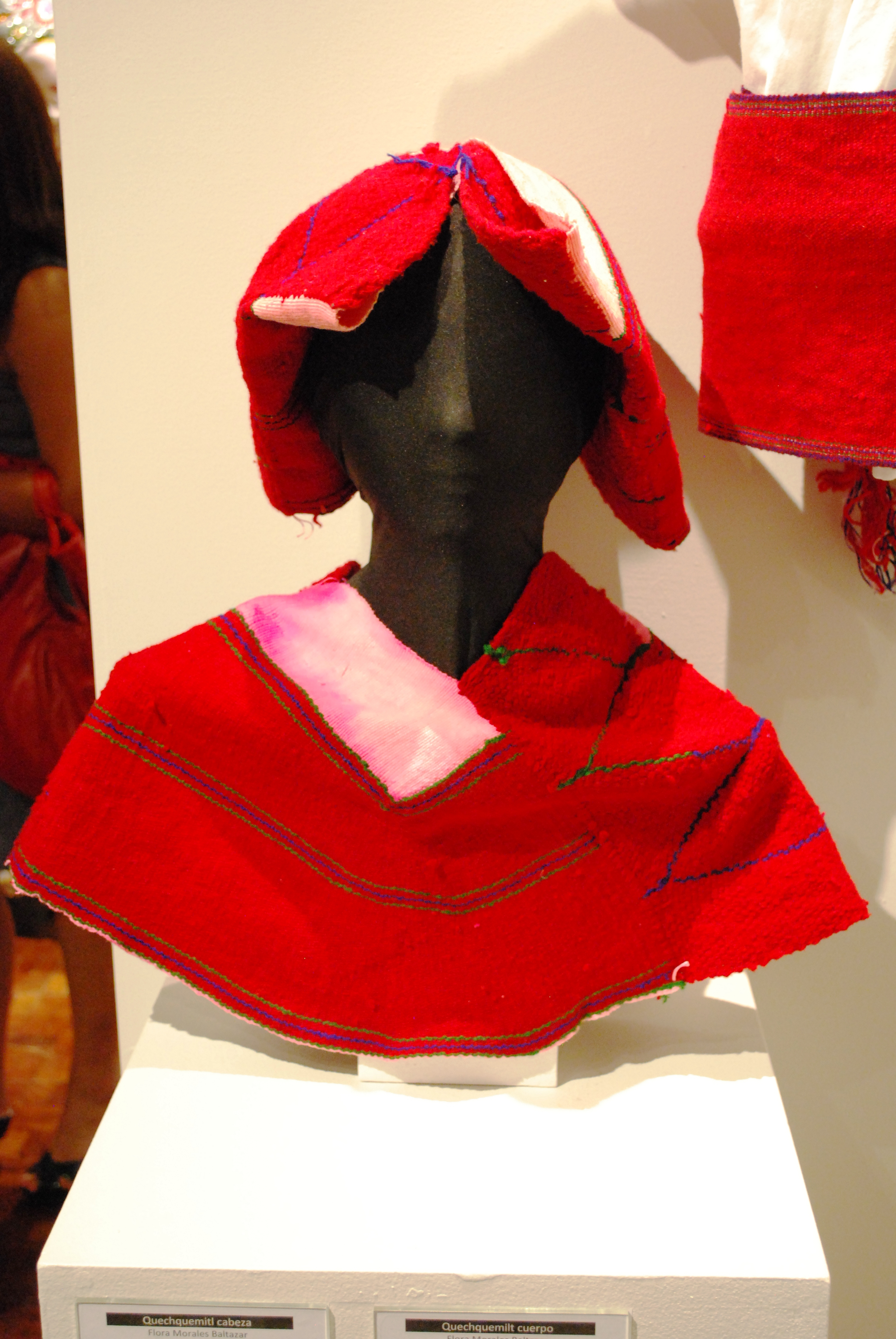
Two ways of wearing a quechquemitl, on the head and on the shoulders. The one on the shoulders is of the curved type

The quechquemitl has been variously described as a shawl, a cape and a triangular cloth, despite only resembling these somewhat when worn. Most quechquemitls are two pieces of rectangular cloth sewn together, and most often worn off the shoulders, covering the upper body. Most have points which can hang down the front and back or over the arms. Quechquemitls are generally worn with various other garments, such as a wraparound skirt tied with a sash, huipil and blouse. The size of the quechquemitl depends on how it is to be worn as well as its relation to other pieces of clothing. Its effect on the overall outfit is determined on this relationship, rather than standing along as a long huipil can. The garment is used for everyday wear, social and ritual occasions.

The garment is found mostly in central Mexico among indigenous women such as the Huastecs, Nahuas, Tepehuas, Otomis, Totonacs, Mazahuas, Pames and Huichols in states such as Nayarit, Jalisco, Querétaro, the State of Mexico, Hidalgo, Puebla and Veracruz. It has also been seen in some other areas such as the Uruapan area in Michoacán, and parts of Morelos, Guerrero and Oaxaca. While it used to be worn as the only upper garment, this practice has almost entirely disappeared, and today it is usually worn over a blouse for decoration or warmth. However, the popularity of highly decorated blouses has led to a diminishing of the quechquemitl. Only among the Totonacs, Otomis and Nahuas is the garment widely used, but even with these it is mostly found on older women. Younger women from the same communities prefer commercial blouses and shirts, reserving the quechquemitl for market days and festivals.

In some areas, the quechquemitl is also worn as a head covering. Among the Tepehuas in Huehuetla, Hidalgo, this kind of quechquemitl is made with a fine gauze.

== Making of the garment ==
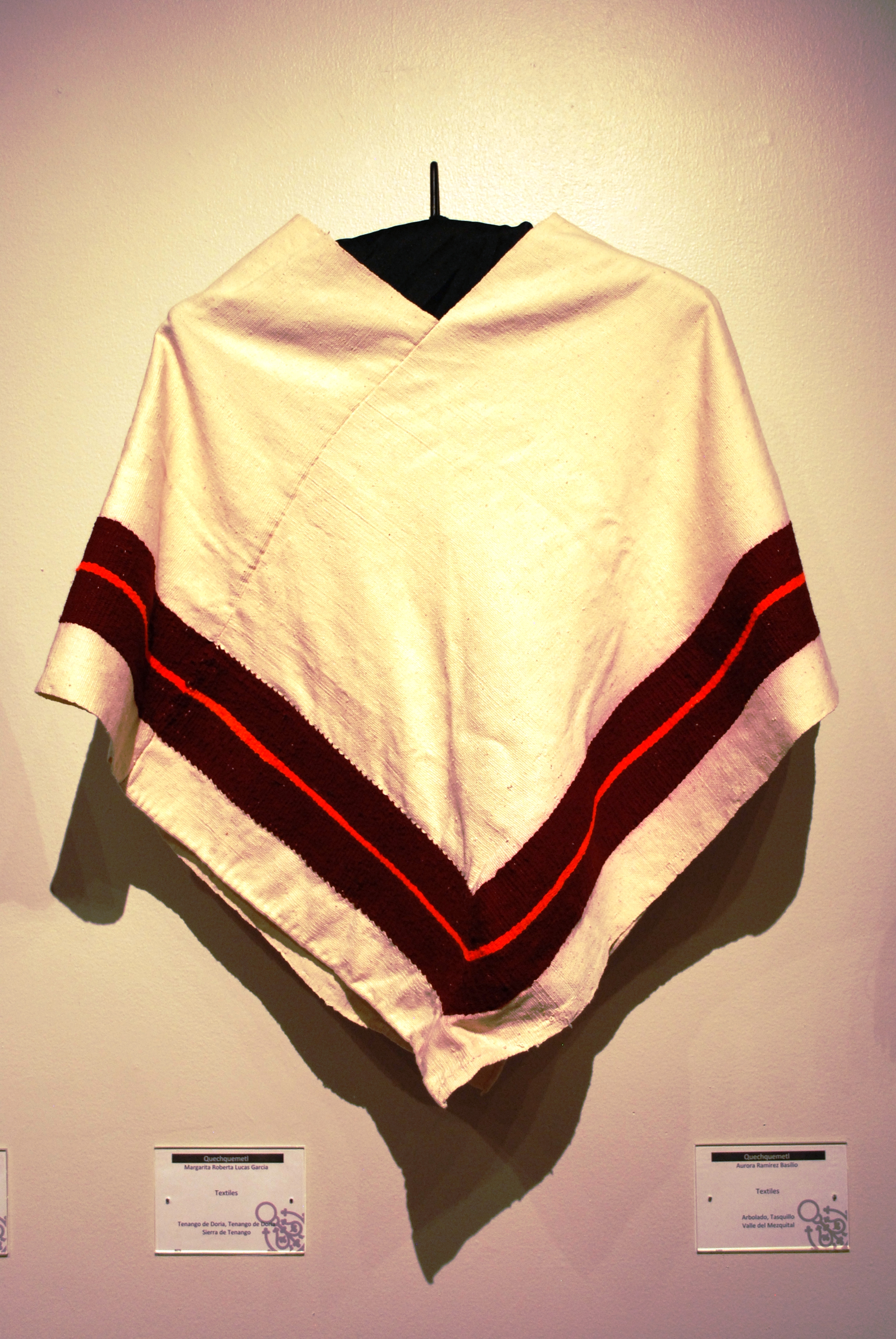
Quechquemitl from Hidalgo at the Museo de Arte Popular in Mexico City

Peoples noted for the making of quechquemilts include the Huastecs, the Nahuas, the Tepehuas, the Huichols and the Otomis and the decoration of the garment can identify from which group it comes. However, the climate of the region it is made also has an effect such as the use of wool in colder areas. There is evidence that a number of motifs dates back to the pre Hispanic period. Others were adopted after the Spanish conquest, and a number are hard to date as they show both European and indigenous influence. Ancient designs include fretwork, a symbol for Quetzalcoatl, the scepter of Quetzalcoatl, related to Ursa Major, an “S” form called an ilhuitl and a cross with branches of equal length which represents the cardinal directions. Colors have symbolic meaning such as yellow for east. One European element is a stylized vase with flowers, but the double headed eagle, can be of either indigenous or European origin. The Huastecs in Tancanhuitz de Santos, San Luis Potosí and the Huichols in Jalisco and Nayarit make their quechquemitls in an undyed cotton, which is heavily embroidered with flowers and animals in various colors. The Nahuas of San Francisco Chapantla, Hidalgo and Hueyapan, Puebla decorate their huipils with fretwork, animals and flowers. Among the Huastecs the garment is usually of undyed cotton which is heavily embroidered.

Like other indigenous garments, the quechquemitl is made from uncut pieces of cloths as they come off the loom. Quechquemitl designs are achieved through weaving (fiber, color, structure), surface ornamentation (usually embroidery) and finishes applied to the seams and edges. Various kinds of weaves are done for quechquemitls includes gauze, seersucker, brocade and curved or shaped weaving. The finest gauze pieces are from the Sierra Norte de Puebla, with very complex arrangements of heddles, often with six used and as many as twenty have been noted. These gauze weavings tend to be more complex than those used for huipils. Some appear as a checkerboard pattern. Seersucker is used by adding commercial threads in stripes along with the handspun threads. The commercial threads do not shrink when washed and the puckering effect is created. Weft brocade is a decorative technique where heavier threads are introduced in the weft to create patterns. A looped brocade is also created by tugging on these weft threads to raise them. These brocades are often mistaken as embroidery in both Mexican and Guatemalan textiles. The curved weaving technique is particularly complicated and unique. Part of the warp is of white cotton and part a colored wool, either red or pink. The wool warp is much longer than the cotton at a point in the weaving producing warp faced fabric. The wool warp is cult and used as weft in a weft faced band, given the look of a colored border. The curvature is designed to fall on the shoulders of the wearer. This type of garment can be found in the Sierra Norte de Puebla region.

There are three methods of joining the pieces of cloth. The first uses two rectangles of cloth with the narrow end of each joined to the long side of the other. This creates a warped loop whose points can be worn front/back or over the shoulders. Another is made with one long rectangle which is folded in half for a square look. The fold goes over one arm the edges going over the other arm are partially sewn, leaving space for the head to pass. A variation on this is two squares of fabric with the arm/shoulder seams sewn, leaving a neck opening. Another variation which is rare is made from a single rectangle from which a smaller rectangle has been cut. Then folded over, the two narrowest edges are sewn. It is worn with points hanging off the shoulders.

== History ==
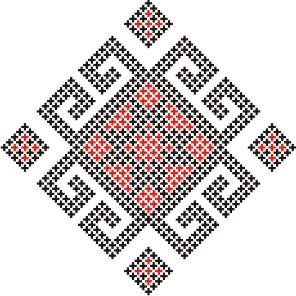
An Otomi decorative element from the Sierra Norte de Puebla

The name “quechquemitl” (sometimes spelled quesquemitl, quezquemitl or quexquemitl) comes from Nahuatl and means “neck garment” (quechtli = neck and tlaquemitl = garment). It has other names in other indigenous languages such as thayemlaab among the Huastecs.

The garment has pre Hispanic origins and has been worn by some indigenous women for about 2,000 years. It is most likely that the garment originated with the Totonacs on the Gulf coast. It was brought to the Mexican highlands by the Otomis. In the pre Hispanic era, the quechquemitl was worn with huipil and a wrap around skirt, generally only for special occasions and by high-ranking women. It may even have been reserved for use by goddesses and those portraying them in ritual in the Aztec era. In this era, it was particularly associated with fertility goddesses possibly due to the origins of the garment in the Gulf Coast region and its fertility. These garments when worn by the nobility were made of cotton, sometimes with rabbit fur or feathers woven in for warmth and/or decoration. There was another variation in which the cloth was twisted before the edges sewn, resulting in a shape that conformed closer to the body. The name of Mixtec princesses often had the word “quechquemitl”. The garments were woven on backstrap looms, which can still be seen today, and dyed with natural colorings such as cochineal, indigo and other plants, animals and minerals.

After the Spanish conquest, the quechquemitl was adopted by all indigenous women. The garment was then worn alone, exposing the midriff or over a huipil. However, today neither of these uses are common. Treadle looms and spinning wheels were also introduced and well as sheep producing wool.

Today, the quechquemitl is still worn but its use has diminished. However, it remains important in Mexican culture. Frida Kahlo, who was known for her wearing of Mexican indigenous clothing, had quechquemetls, including one from Puebla with symbols related to fertility which are no longer made. There have been conferences and other academic events devoted to the garment, such as a CONACULTA sponsored conference at the Museo Nacional de Antropología . and a conference on its use in Nahua and Huastec identities at the Centro de las Artes in San Luis Potosí.
