= Altamirano, Chihuahua =

Village in the Mexican state of Chihuahua

Coordinates: 30°21′18″N 108°29′44″W

Altamirano is a village in Janos Municipality in northwestern Chihuahua, Mexico. It had a 2010 census population of 255 inhabitants and is situated 1,800 meters (5,906 ft.) above sea level.
