= Altamura Painter =

Classical Greek vase painter

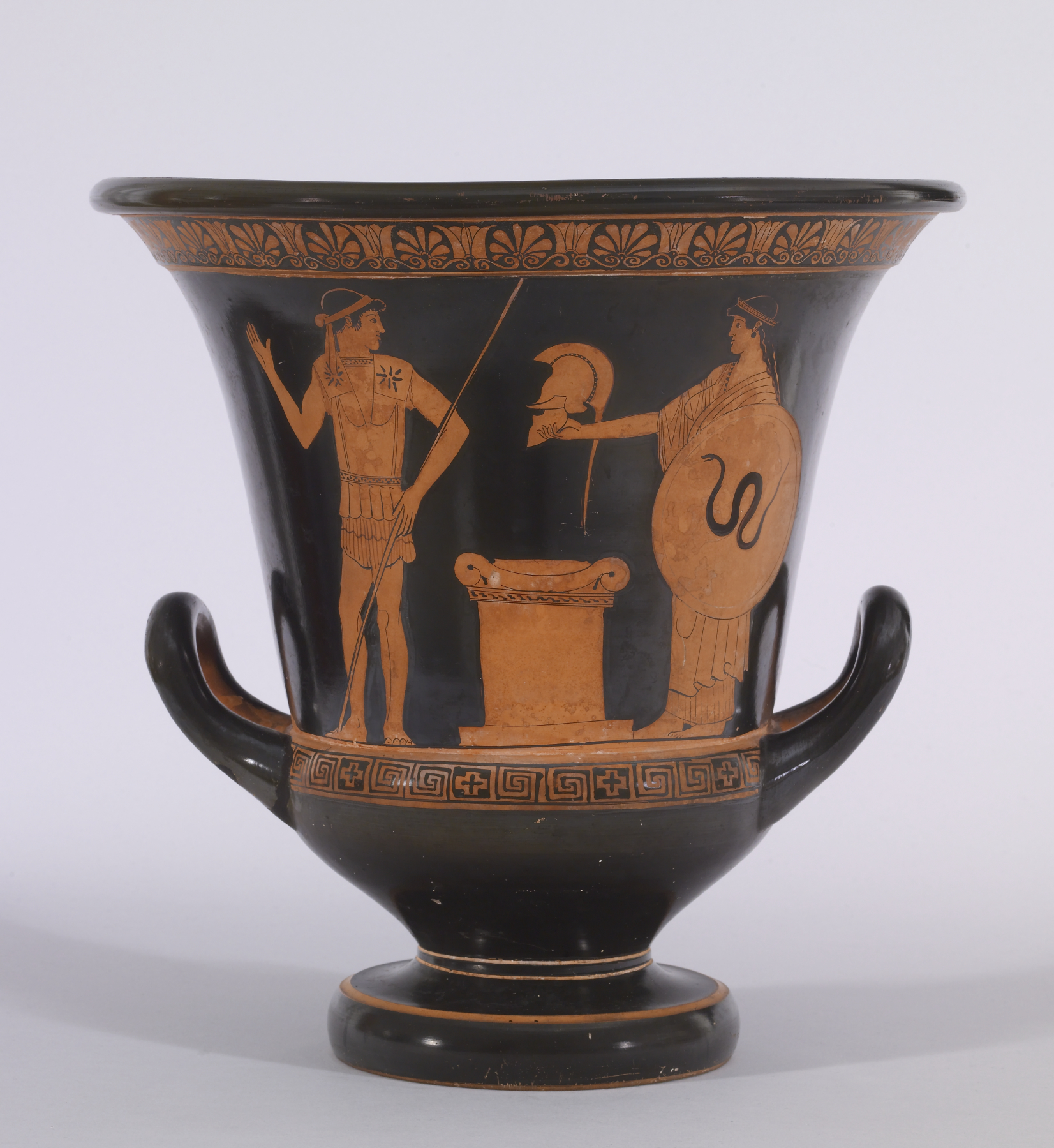
Warrior and woman standing beside a family altar. Side A of a red-figure calyx krater, Walters Art Museum.

The Altamura Painter was a classical Greek vase painter. Today about 127 different vases are attributed to him. Many of them were different types of pottery, such as amphorae, kraters, pelikei, and many others. The Altamura Painter's pottery work is dated from 475 BC to 425 BC. He mostly painted mythical gods and goddesses, as well as ordinary people.

The Altamura Painter was the stylistic "older brother" of the Niobid Painter. They worked on new techniques which gave their characters different levels of depth and space on the paintings. He worked with the style known as the red-figure technique, which was an evolution from a technique known as black–figure. Many of his vases were discovered in parts of Southern Italy. Some were also found in Athens.

He worked in a workshop in Greece with the Niobid Painter and with other painters such as the Geneva Painter, the Painter of London, the Painter of Berlin Hydria, and the Blenheim Painter.. The workshop shows that the vases that were made there were most likely sold for a large profit, because of the time that was taken to make the vases.

The Altamura Painter is often confused with the Blenheim Painter because they have very similar style as a result of them working in the same workshop. They both picked up art styles making them look similar. His style of painting is predominantly focused on the characters in the paintings. He made his characters very detailed, showing special facial features and extreme details on their clothes as well, showing them in a different unique view.
