= San Felipe del Progreso =

- Municipality
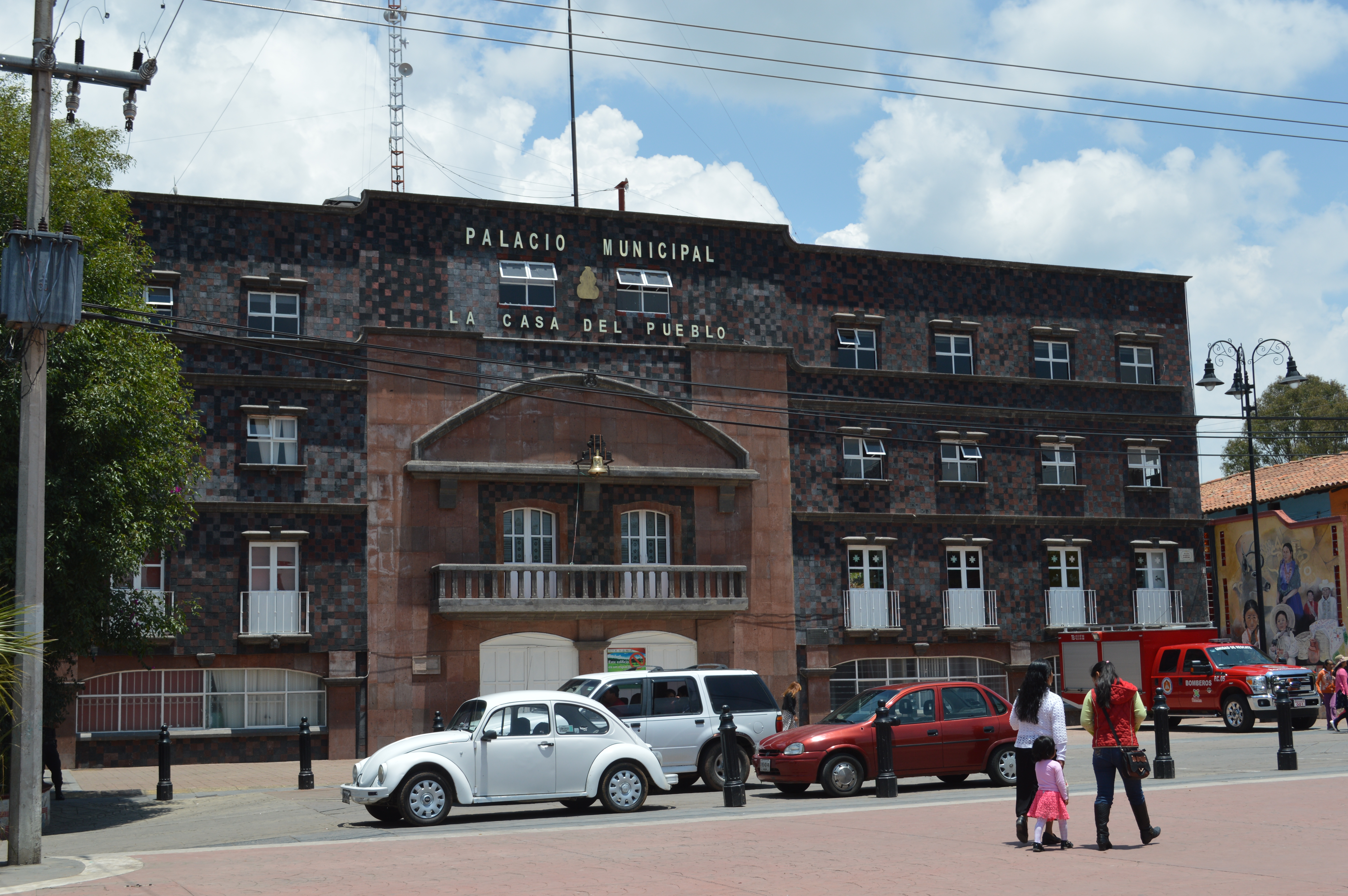
- Town hall

- Coat of arms

- Location within Mexico
- Coordinates: 19°42′45″N 99°57′04″W
- Country: Mexico
- State: Mexico State
- Municipality: San Felipe del Progreso
- Municipal seat: San Felipe del Progreso
- Founded: 1547
- Municipal Status: 1826

Government
  - Municipal President: Eduardo Zarzosa Sanchez (2006-2009) APM
- Elevation: 2,570 m (8,430 ft)

Population (2005)Municipality
  - Total: 100,201
  - Seat: 4,001
- Time zone: UTC-6 (CST)
- Postal code: 50640
- Website: (in Spanish) http://www.sanfelipedelprogreso.gob.mx/

San Felipe del Progreso is a municipality in the northwest of the State of Mexico. The municipal seat and third largest town is the town of San Felipe del Progreso. It is in the western part of the state, 59 km from the state capital of Toluca and 72 km southwest of Atlacomulco. In colonial times, the village was founded as "San Felipe" or "San Felipe Ixtlahuaca". Later it was called "San Felipe el Grande" and "San Felipe del Obraje". In the second half of the 19th century, it received its current name of "San Felipe del Progreso."

== The town ==
There is indication of Mazahua presence in the area from the seventh century. However, they were constantly besieged by neighboring peoples. This area was conquered in 1379 by the Purépecha chiefs Acamapichtli and Tezozómoc. The area came under Aztec rule when Axayácatl during his campaign to reach Tlalchimaloyan, now Ciudad Hidalgo, Michoacán in 1474 and remained under Tenochtitlan's rule until the Spanish Conquest.

The Spanish took over the area around 1552, calling it “San Felipe el Grande”. By the time of the Mexican War of Independence, when the priest Miguel Hidalgo y Costilla came to the town, it was known as “San Felipe del Obraje”. On January 1, 1826, San Felipe del Obraje was declared a municipality and on October 13, 1877, the village was renamed San Felipe del Progreso.

The population of the town as of 2005 was 4,001.

== The municipality ==
The municipality has a territory of 856.05 km2, and a population in 2005 of 100,201. 24,723 of the municipality's inhabitants speak a native language, mainly Mazahua. The male to female ratio of the town is 48% - 52%.

The municipality borders the municipalities of Tlalpujahua, El Oro, Jocotitlán, San José del Rincón, Villa Victoria, Almoloya de Juárez and Ixtlahuaca. The municipality of San José del Rincón was created from the western part of San Felipe del Progreso in 2002.

=== Geography ===
The predominant weather is mild with rain in the summer. The annual temperature varies between 12 and 18 degrees Celsius, with extremes of 2C and 28C. The rainy season is in July, August and September. In February and March, it is windy, while in December, January, and in February and March there can be some frost. In April and May temperatures are moderately warm.

Despite heavy logging, the municipality is heavily forested. Trees here include: oyamel, cedar, pine, holm oak, strawberry trees, oaks, and ocote. Animals in the wild include: coyotes, tigrillos, vipers, chameleons, buzzards, eagles, badgers, foxes, weasels, squirrels, ferrets, moles, ducks, barn owls, hares, rabbits, armadillos, skunks, tlacuaches, wildcats, quail and turtledoves. There is an area closest to the border with Michoacan that has been set aside as a monarch butterfly sanctuary for their annual migration south in the winter. Unfortunately, much of this habitat was destroyed in a 1997 forest fire; however, the municipality has worked since then to rehabilitate the area.

=== Culture ===
The predominant religion is Catholicism with 90 percent of the communities. There are some exceptions like San Agustin Mextepec and Mayorazgo where Protestant communities live together.

There are 50 grade schools in the territory which have 4858 students. There are four high schools or preparatory schools which have 1014 students. There are only one level with specialization in primary education and 165 students. 26.41% of the population over 15 years are illiterate. There is an intercultural community college founded in 2004 called the UIEM, or the Universidad Intercultural Estado de Mexico, that specializes in indigenous language and culture, as well as intercultural health and communication.

The Mazahua Ceremonial Center is located between Santa Ana Nichi-Fresno and Nichi-San Antonio de las Huertas. It is visited regularly, but especially on the first Sunday of each month. The ethnic Mazahua conduct their rituals and practice their customs, attracting tourism, both national and international to the area. There is a tourist centre with playground equipment, 96 white-tailed deer, 35 Andes cattle and other interesting animals. There are also a heliport, a museum, a craft center, board rooms, auditorium outdoors, craft workshops and roadways with beautiful flowers and plants among a forest of pines and oyameles.

=== Economic activities ===
Agriculture is the basic activity of San Felipe, growing corn, potato, zacaton, beans, tomatoes, squash, wheat, oats, and barley are grown. Live-stock includes cattle, sheep, horses, poultry and rabbits, but these are strictly for auto-consumption.

There are a large number of sawmills with licenses to cut wood. There is a deposit of tezontle which is administered by the government of San Felipe. There are quarry deposits that have not been exploited, like sandbars, tepojal, etc.
