= Altamirano, Guanajuato =

Village in Guanajuato, Mexico

Altamirano
- Location within Guanajuato Location within Mexico
- Coordinates: 20°44′00″N 101°57′00″W
- Country: Mexico
- State: Guanajuato
- Municipality: Manuel Doblado
- Elevation: 1,725 m (5,659 ft)
- Time zone: UTC−6

Altamirano is a village in located in the municipality of Manuel Doblado, Guanajuato, Mexico.
