= Elda Gómez Lugo =

Mexican politician

- Born: 13 January 1941 (age 85); State of Mexico, Mexico
- Occupation: Politician
- Political party: PRI

Elda Gómez Lugo (born 13 January 1941) is a Mexican politician affiliated with the Institutional Revolutionary Party (PRI). In the 2006 general election she was elected to the Chamber of Deputies to represent the State of Mexico's 9th district during the 60th session of Congress.
