= Altamirano (surname) =

Altamirano is a Spanish surname. Notable people with the surname include:

- Armin Altamirano Luistro (born 1961), Filipino politician and religious leader
- Carlos Altamirano (1922–2019), Chilean socialist politician
- Eric Altamirano (born 1966), Filipino basketball player and coach
- Fernando Altamirano (1848–1908), Mexican physician, botanist, and naturalist
- Héctor Altamirano (born 1977), Mexican footballer
- Ignacio Manuel Altamirano (1834–1893), Mexican novelist and politician
- Luis Altamirano (1867–1938), Chilean military officer
- Porfi Altamirano (born 1952), Nicaraguan baseball player
- Pedro de Anda Altamirano (1551–1619), Spanish conquistador
