= San Agustín Altamirano =

Coordinates: 19°22′52″N 99°58′48″W

San Agustín Altamirano (also known as San Agustín and Altamirano) is a village located in Villa Victoria, in the State of Mexico, Mexico.
