= MV Empire Atoll =

World War II merchant ship of the United Kingdom

History
- Name: Empire Atoll (1941-46); Hadrian Coast (1946-67); Elda (1967-70)
- Owner: Ministry of War Transport (1941-46); Coast Lines Ltd (1946-67); E Davidou & others, Greece (1967-70)
- Operator: Coast Lines Ltd (1942-67); E Davidou & others (1967-70)
- Port of registry: (United Kingdom) Liverpool (1941-67); (Greece) Piraeus (1967-70)
- Builder: Ardrossan Dockyard Ltd, Ardrossan
- Yard number: 385
- Launched: 12 July 1941
- Completed: January 1942
- Identification: Official Number 168807 (1941-67); Code Letters BOSZ (1941-46)
- Fate: Wrecked 10 January 1970

General characteristics
- Tonnage: 693 GRT; 990 long tons deadweight (DWT)
- Length: 201 ft 3 in (61.34 m)
- Beam: 33 ft 2 in (10.11 m)
- Depth: 11 ft 7 in (3.53 m)
- Propulsion: 2 x 7 cylinder SCSA diesel engines (British Auxiliaries Ltd, Glasgow) 1,120 hp (840 kW)
- Speed: 11 knots (20 km/h)
- Capacity: 50,604 cubic feet (1,432.9 m^{3}) refrigerated cargo space

Empire Atoll was a British 693 ton refrigerated coaster which was built to the order of Coast Lines Ltd. She was requisitioned by Ministry of War Transport, being returned to Coast Lines in 1946 and renamed Hadrian Coast. She was sold to Greece in 1967 and renamed Elda. She was shipwrecked near Mehidia, Morocco on 10 January 1970.

== History ==
=== War service ===
Empire Atoll was built by Ardrossan Dockyard Ltd, Ardrossan as yard number 385. She was powered by two 7 cylinder diesel engines. She was built to the order of Coast Line Ltd and was the only refrigerated coaster built in wartime in the UK. She was launched on 12 July 1941 and completed in January 1942. She was built for Coast Lines Ltd but was requisitioned by the MoWT, operating under the management of Coast Lines. Her port of registry was Liverpool.

Empire Atoll was a member of a number of convoys during the Second World War.

FS 33

Convoy FS 33 sailed from Methil on 7 February 1943 and arrived in London on 10 February. Empire Atoll was carrying a cargo of frozen meat.

=== Postwar ===
In 1946, Empire Atoll reverted to Coast Lines and was renamed Hadrian Coast. She was sold to E Davidou & others, Greece in 1967 and renamed Elda. Her port of registry was changed to Piraeus. On 10 January 1970, Elda dragged her anchors and grounded near Mehidia, Morocco after developing engine trouble and a leak on a voyage between Ravenna, Italy and Kenitra, Morocco. She was a total loss.

== Official number and code letters ==
Official Numbers were a forerunner to IMO Numbers.

Empire Atoll had the UK Official Number 168807 and used the Code Letters BOSZ.
