= Altamira (surname) =

Altamira is a Spanish surname. Notable people with the surname include:

- Cristina Altamira (born 1953), Argentine mezzo-soprano singer
- Jorge Altamira (born José Saúl Wermus in 1942), Argentine activist and leader of the Workers' Party
- Rafael Altamira y Crevea (1866–1951), Spanish historian and jurist
