= San José Villa de Allende =

- Town
- Interactive map of San José Villa de Allende
- Coordinates: 19°22′29″N 100°08′51″W
- Country: Mexico
- State: State of Mexico
- Municipality: Villa de Allende

Government
  - Municipal president: Juan Arreola Venteño (2006-2009) (coalition)
- Time zone: UTC-6 (CST)
- Website: (in Spanish)

San Jose Villa de Allende is a town and municipal seat of the municipality of Villa de Allende. It is the fifth largest town in the municipality. It is located 70 kilometers to the west of the city of Toluca. Villa de Allende was named in honor of Ignacio Allende, a hero of the Mexican War of Independence.

== The town ==
The town had a population of 1,169 as of the 2005 census and an elevation of 2,380 meters above sea level.

Early human inhabitation of the area is evidenced by archeological finds such as ceramics and arrowheads, as well as stone walls with bas relief carvings. Most of these are found in the nearby settlement of San Cayetano.

The village was founded by the Mazahuas, with a name meaning "beautiful place" in that language. They arrived around the 7th century AD, and were under the domination of the Chichimecas. After Aztec domination, its name was changed to 'Malacatepec', meaning "spindle hill". After the arrival of the Spaniards, the town fought with the Aztecs but the area was subdued by Gonzalo de Sandoval in 1521. Evangelization of the area was accomplished by friars from the Franciscan monastery at Toluca, who gave the town the name of San José Malacatepec in 1542 and built the temple of San José in 1554. The village gained town status in 1778 when it had a population of 6,138. From colonial times to the Mexican War of Independence in 1810, the Mazahuas of the area were often subjected to being slaves or near-slaves to the colonial authorities, mostly working forcibly at the nearby haciendas of La Gavia, Sabana del Rosario, Salitre de Urendis and San Bartolo. This led the populace to embrace the arrival of José María Morelos y Pavón in the area and join the rebellion.

The town's bullring was built in 1945, made of adobe and wooden beams and was remodeled in 1981. The current municipal palace was constructed in 1960.

The town's church is noted for its gilded wood altar on which is an urn with the ashes of the church's founders. Above this is an oval portrait of the Virgin of Guadalupe which has survived in excellent condition for over three centuries. It also has a number of notable oil paintings with religious themes.

== The municipality ==
As municipal seat, San José Villa de Allende is the governing authority for the following communities: El Aventurero, Batán Chico, Berros, Bosencheve, Buenavista Veintitrés (Agua Zarca), Cabecera de Indígenas (Barrio de la Cabecera), Cerro de Guadalupe, El Salitre del Cerro, Cuesta del Carmen, Las Dalias (San Miguel), Filiberto Gómez, El Jacal, Loma de Juárez, Sabana del Madroño (El Madroño), Mesas de San Martín, Mesas de Zacango (Zacango), Sabana de la Peña (La Peña), La Piedra, Sabana del Refugio, Ejido la Sabana de San Jerónimo, Sabana del Rosario (San Miguel), Sabana Taborda Primera Sección, San Cayetano (Barrio de Santiago), San Felipe Santiago, San Francisco de Asís, San Ildefonso, San Isidro, San Jerónimo Totoltepec, San Juan Buenavista (Lodo Prieto), San Miguel, San Pablo Malacatepec, Santa María (Santa María de las Delicias), Santa Teresa, Barrio de Santiago (Ejido de Santiago), Soledad del Salitre (El Salitre), Vare Chiquichuca, Sabana Taborda Segunda Sección, Macia (Ejido de Macia), El Clarín (La Mesa del Clarín), Lengua de Vaca (El Puerto), Las Mesas de San Jerónimo, Barrio de San Juan, Las Casitas, Loma de San Pablo, Manzana de Cashte, Sabana de San Jerónimo, Santa Cruz (La Rinconada), El Chirimoyo, Los Hoyos (Manzana los Hoyos), Potrero, Colchones, San Miguel la Máquina, Santa Cruz, El Cinco (Ejido Barrio de Santiago el Cinco), Ejido de San Martín, Buenavista, Chiquichuca (Barrio Chiquichuca), Loma Bonita, Barrio el Boncho, Casa Blanca, Barrio Chichicaishle, Barrio la Joya, Manzana la Pera, Mesas de San Juan Buenavista, La Peña, Barrio los Pozos, El Puerto, Rancho Morelos, Barrio el Salto and Barrio los Tules. the total municipal population was 41,938 in 2005.

The municipality was created in 1878. It extends 318.80 km^{2}, encompassing terrain that varies in altitude between 2,380 and 3,200 meters above sea level. It has two notable peaks called the "Cerro del Pelón" and the "Cerro del Zapatero". It has four principal rivers called the La Asunción, San José, Los Berros and El Salitre, as well as 18 streams and ravines. It has two bodies of water called the Laguna Seca and the Laguna Verde, which are reservoirs for Mexico City and Toluca.

The municipality has been known for its abundant forests, even though they have suffered from bad logging practices in the first part of the 20th century by foreign companies such as The Suchit Timber Company as well as national ones like Forestal de México.

By far the primary economic activity here is agriculture with almost 70% of the municipalities land dedicated to it. Various crops such as corn, wheat, potatoes, fava beans, peas, barley, oats, avocados, pears and walnuts. While some agriculture activity occurs year-round through irrigation, most occurs in the summer during the rainy season. Livestock consists primarily of cattle with significant numbers of horses, poultry, rabbits and bees. Industry is limited to textiles, blacksmithing and food processing. Tourism consists of visitors to the monarch butterfly sanctuary, located partially in the municipality as well as Bosencheve National Park.
