= Palacio de los Vivero =

Palace in Valladolid, Spain

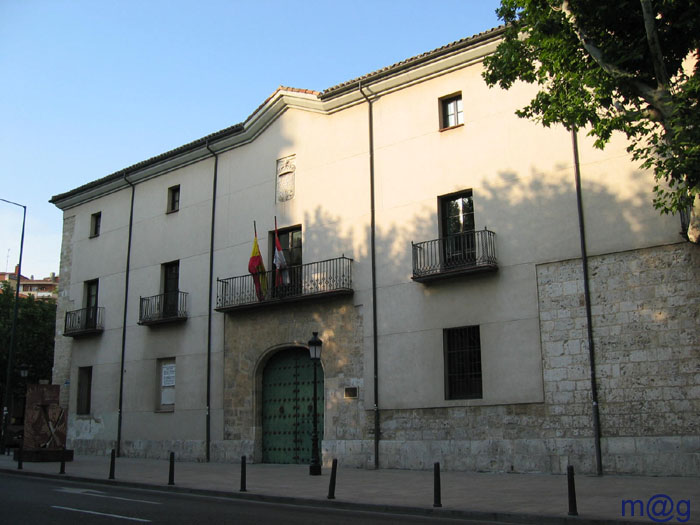
- The Palacio de los Vivero

- Location within Spain
- Alternative names: Antigua Chancillería

General information
- Type: Palace
- Architectural style: Gothic-Mudéjar
- Location: Valladolid, Castile and León, Spain, Spain
- Coordinates: 41.6565°N 4.7205°W
- Current tenants: Provincial Historical Archive of Valladolid
- Completed: c. 1440

Technical details
- Floor count: 2

Design and construction
- Designations: Bien de Interés Cultural (1964)

The Palacio de los Vivero is a 15th-century palace in Valladolid, Castile and León, Spain. Built around 1440 for the Vivero family, it was the site of the 1469 marriage of the future Catholic Monarchs, Isabella of Castile and Ferdinand of Aragon. From the late 15th century it housed the Real Audiencia y Chancillería de Valladolid, and it houses the Provincial Historical Archive of Valladolid.

== History ==
The palace was built around 1440 for Alonso Pérez de Vivero, chief accountant (contador mayor) to King John II of Castile, in a Gothic-Mudéjar style.

The owner's son sided with the Infanta Isabella against her half-brother Henry IV of Castile, and in October 1469 Isabella and Ferdinand of Aragon were married in the palace's Sala Rica ('Rich Hall'). After becoming monarchs, the couple ordered the palace's towers demolished in 1475, and in 1489 the Crown confiscated the building from the Vivero family and installed in it the Real Audiencia y Chancillería de Valladolid.

== Building ==
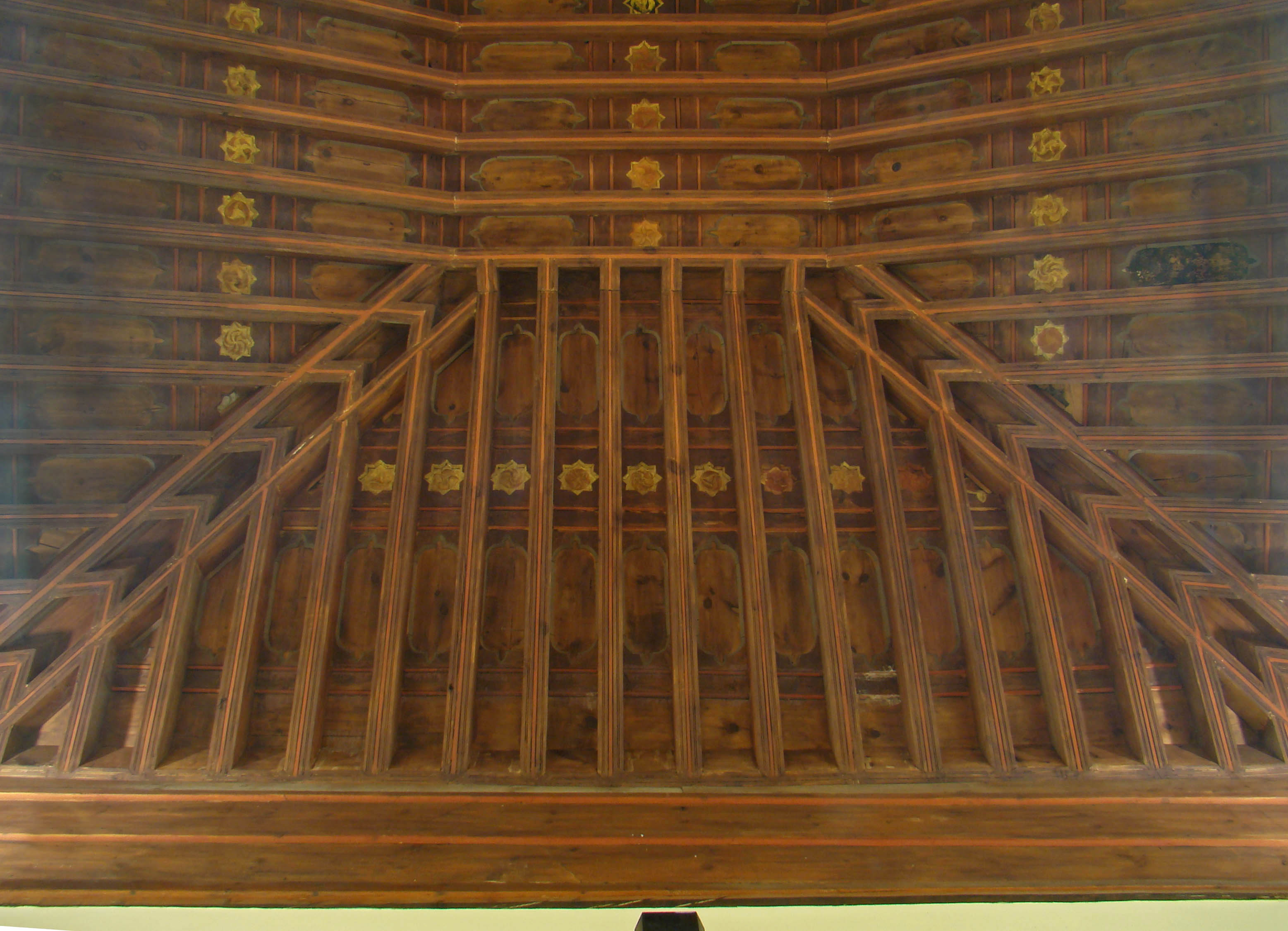
A timber artesonado (coffered ceiling) in the palace

The palace has a rammed-earth structure with a basement and two storeys on a quadrangular plan, set around a central two-storey patio; a 16th-century Tuscan gallery runs along the south front. It was declared a monumento histórico-artístico (now a Bien de Interés Cultural) by decree of 9 July 1964. It houses the Provincial Historical Archive of Valladolid.
