= Villa Victoria =

- Municipality
- Coat of arms

- Location in Mexico
- Coordinates: 19°26′N 100°0′W
- Country: Mexico
- State: Mexico (state)
- Municipal Seat: Villa Victoria

Area
  - Total: 424.03 km^{2} (163.72 sq mi)
- Elevation: 2,560 m (8,400 ft)

Population (2005)
  - Total: 77,819
- Time zone: UTC-6 (Central Standard Time)

Villa Victoria is a municipality in Mexico State in Mexico. The municipality covers an area of 424.03 km^{2} (163.72 sq mi).

In 2005, the municipality's population was 77,819.

== See also ==
- San Agustín Altamirano, a town in the municipality
