= Salvador Sánchez Colín =

Mexican politician (1912–2002)

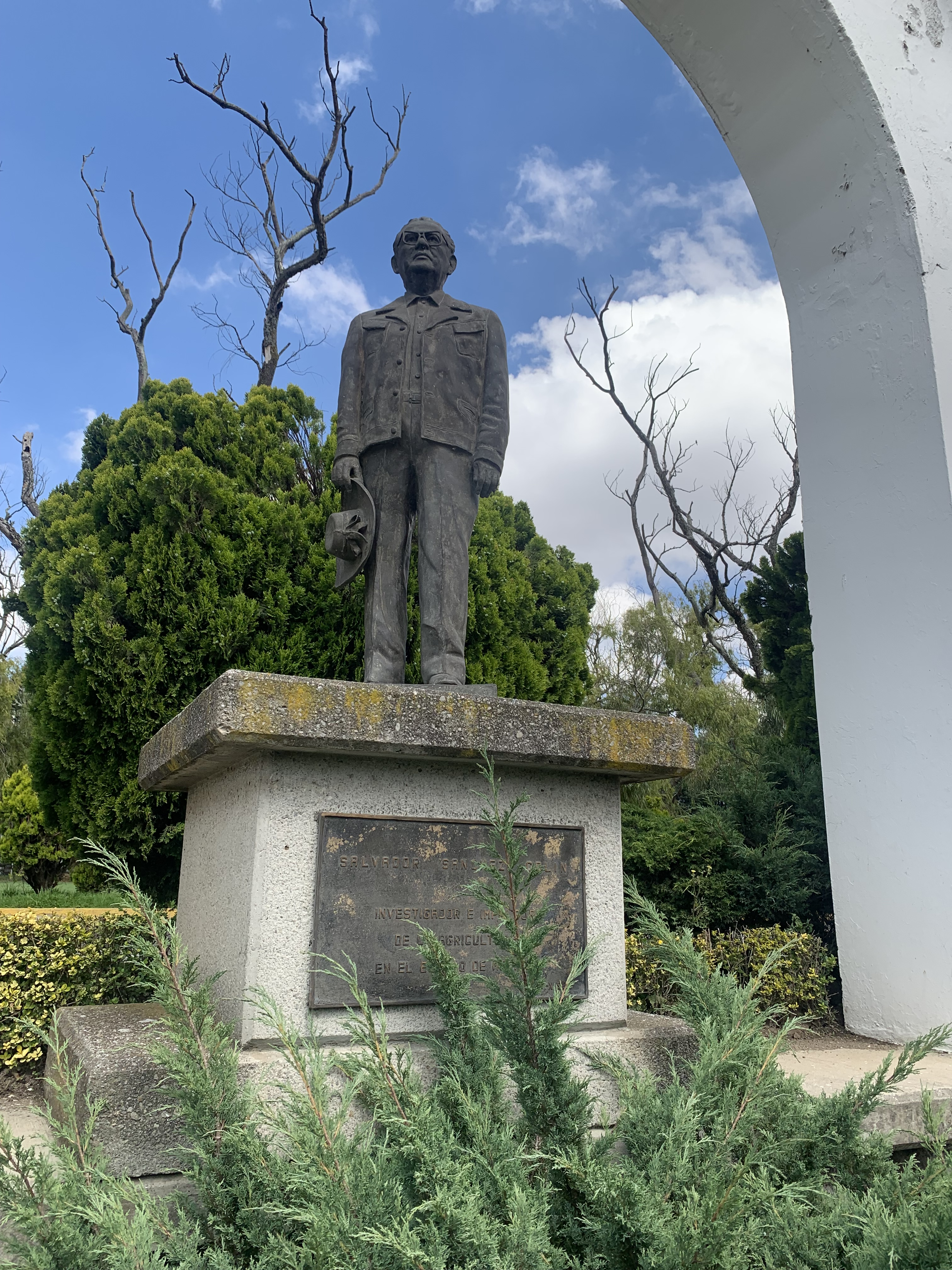

Governor of the State of Mexico
- In office 16 September 1951 – 15 September 1957
- Preceded by: Alfredo del Mazo Vélez
- Succeeded by: Gustavo Baz Prada

Personal details
- Born: 14 May 1912 Atlacomulco, Edomex, Mexico
- Died: 14 May 2002 (aged 90) Federal District, Mexico
- Party: PRI
- Education: ENA
- Occupation: Politician
- Profession: Agricultural engineer

Salvador Sánchez Colín (Note: In this Mexican name, the surname is Sánchez and the second or maternal family name is Colín.) (14 May 1912 – 14 May 2002) was a Mexican politician. A member of the Atlacomulco Group within the Institutional Revolutionary Party (PRI), he served as governor of the State of Mexico from 1951 to 1957.

== Political career ==
Sánchez Colín was born into a peasant family in Atlacomulco de Fabela, State of Mexico, in 1912. He studied primary school in Atlacomulco, secondary school in Mexico City, and took a degree in agricultural engineering from the National School of Agriculture (ENA) in 1939. He later taught botany and mathematics at the Industrial Institute of Tijuana in Baja California.

In the 1946 general election, he was elected as Adolfo López Mateos's alternate as senator for the State of Mexico and, in 1950, he was elected to represent Texcoco in the Congress of the State of Mexico.

In 1951, he was elected to a six-year term as governor of the State of Mexico; both Carlos Hank González and Leonardo Rodríguez Alcaine were members of his government team. During his governorship, he established Mexico's first agricultural extension programme. While his administration focused largely on the state's agricultural development, it also worked to promote industrial development in Toluca, Naucalpan and Tlalnepantla and, in 1956, it created the Autonomous University of the State of Mexico (UAEM) from the pre-existing Scientific and Literary Institute of Toluca.

At the end of his gubernatorial team, he is thought to have aspired to be the PRI's candidate in the 1958 presidential election, but the nomination went to López Mateos.

Sánchez Colín was a member of the Atlacomulco Group, a faction within the PRI that has controlled much of the State of Mexico's political destiny since the party's consolidation.

Salvador Sánchez Colín died in Mexico City on 14 May 2002, his 90th birthday, and, pursuant to an executive decree issued by Governor Arturo Montiel Rojas, was interred in the Rotonda de Personajes Ilustres del Estado de México in Toluca.
