= Autopista Toluca–Naucalpan =

Toll highway between Naucalpan and Toluca

Autopista Toluca–Naucalpan
- Carretera Federal 134D
- Autopista Toluca–Naucalpan highlighted in red

Route information
- Maintained by Sistema de Autopistas, Aeropuertos, Servicios Conexos y Auxiliares del Estado de México (SAASCAEM)
- Length: 39.2 km (24.4 mi)
- Existed: October 21, 2020–present

Major junctions
- West end: Vicinity of Toluca International Airport, Toluca
- Libramiento Nororiente de Toluca; State Highway 36 near San Nicolás Peralta; La Glorieta / Santa Cruz Ayotuxco
- East end: Autopista Chamapa–Lechería in Naucalpan de Juárez

Location
- Country: Mexico
- State: México
- Municipalities: Toluca; Lerma; Huixquilucan; Naucalpan de Juárez

Highway system
- Expressways of Mexico

Secondary characteristics
- Identifier: MEX 134D (Federal Highway 134D)
- Speed limit
- Number of lanes: 4 (2 per direction)
- Toll plazas: Chamapa, Ayotuxco, San Nicolás and Cerrillo
- Toll rate: $194 MXN (full route, car)
- Maintained by: Sistema de Autopistas, Aeropuertos, Servicios Conexos y Auxiliares del Estado de México (SAASCAEM)
- Concessionaire: Autovan (Grupo Higa)
- Network: Expressways of Mexico

The Autopista Toluca–Naucalpan (English: Toluca-Naucalpan expressway), designated in the Mexican federal highway network as Federal Highway 134D, is a 39.2-kilometer toll road that connects the Toluca Valley —beginning near Boulevard Aeropuerto and the Libramiento Nororiente de Toluca— with the western area of the Valley of Mexico, linking directly with the Autopista Chamapa–Lechería (Federal Highway 57D), within the municipality of Naucalpan de Juárez.

== History ==
The Autopista Toluca–Naucalpan originally began to take shape during the administration of Governor Arturo Montiel, but was officially promoted during the tenure of Enrique Peña Nieto as Governor of the State of Mexico (2006–2012).

In April 2007, the concession to build, operate, and maintain the 39-kilometer expressway was awarded to the company Autovan. The initial plan called for an investment of between 4 and 5 billion pesos, with a projected opening between 2009 and 2011. The original concession was granted for 30 years, but was later extended to 60 years.

Despite the projected timelines, construction was stalled for years due to significant opposition from local indigenous communities. Much of the expressway's route passed through the Bosque Otomí-Mexica, a protected natural area. From 2008 onward, indigenous communities in municipalities such as Lerma and Huixquilucan began organizing against the project, arguing that it would destroy sacred sites and pilgrimage routes.

In 2016, the National Human Rights Commission (CNDH) issued a recommendation stating that the right to prior, free, and informed consultation of indigenous communities had been violated, and that the environmental impact assessments did not meet international standards. The case also reached bodies of the United Nations and the IACHR.

=== Inauguration ===
After more than 10 years of legal disputes and modifications to certain sections to mitigate environmental damage, the expressway was finally inaugurated on October 21, 2020 under the administration of Governor Alfredo del Mazo. Its total cost soared from the originally projected 4 billion pesos to over 11 billion pesos. It is now considered one of the most expensive toll roads in the State of Mexico. Its main technical achievement is the reduction of travel time between Toluca International Airport and the western Mexico City metropolitan area to just 22 minutes.

== Route ==
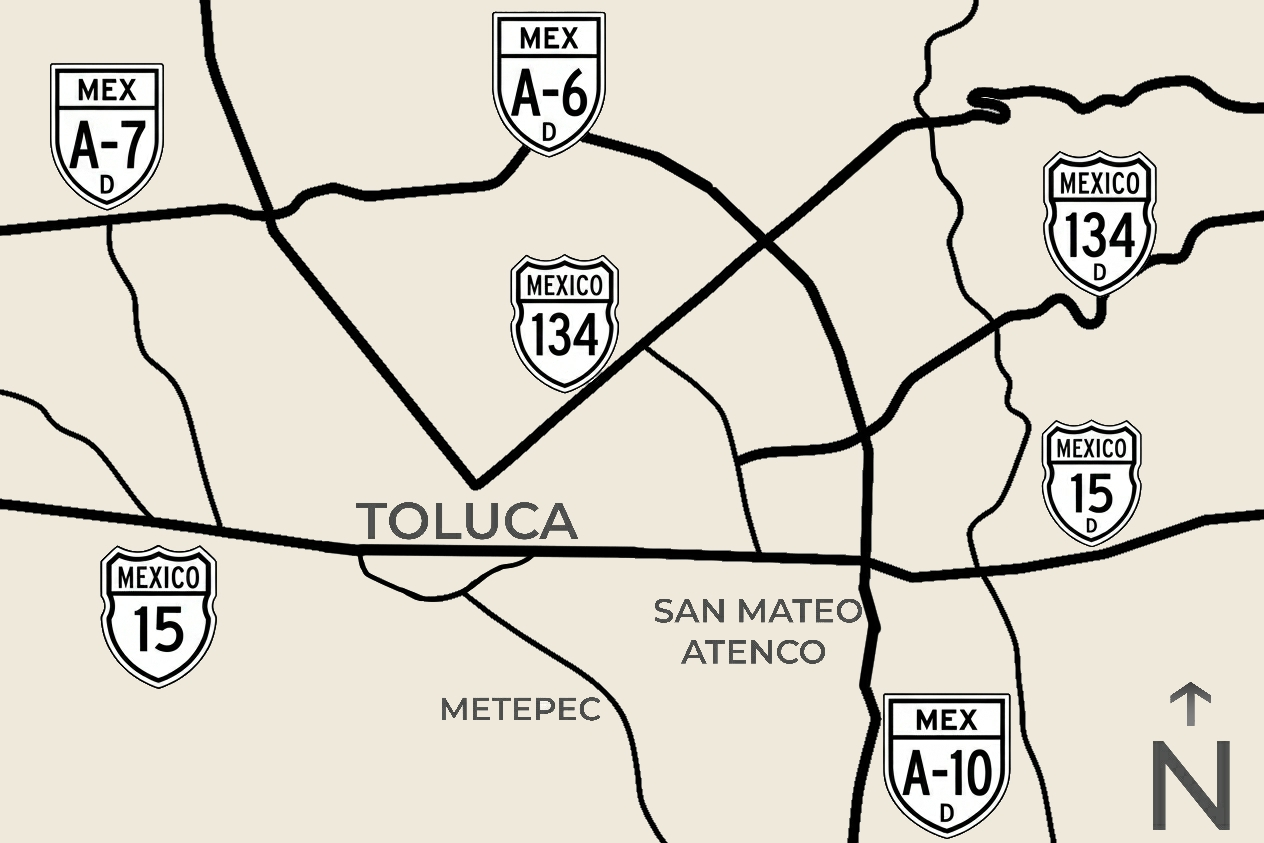
Toluca road network. The one marked as "134D" is the Autopista Toluca–Naucalpan.

The Autopista Toluca–Naucalpan begins in the municipality of Toluca, specifically at the interchange with Boulevard Aeropuerto and the Libramiento Nororiente. At this starting point, the first 4.5 kilometers of the route serve as a toll-free section. It then connects with State Highway 36 near San Nicolás Peralta and continues for more than 10 kilometers to the junction between La Glorieta and Santa Cruz Ayotuxco. Within the municipality of Huixquilucan, the road crosses numerous viaducts and tunnels through the rugged forested terrain of the area. Finally, the road terminates at the Autopista Chamapa–Lechería, part of Federal Highway 57D, which serves as an eastern ring road of the ZMVM.

=== Characteristics and importance ===
The Autopista Toluca–Naucalpan passes through the State of Mexico municipalities of Toluca, Lerma, Huixquilucan, and Naucalpan de Juárez. In its initial stretch, the road runs across the flatlands of the Toluca Valley, before entering and traversing a largely mountainous and forested route through the Sierra de las Cruces. Due to this complex topography, the highway relies on a series of viaducts and tunnels to cross the ravines of the natural environment, achieving an efficient connection between the valley and the western metropolitan area.

== Major intersections ==
State	Municipality	mi	km	Destinations	Notes
State of Mexico	Toluca	0.0	0	Boulevard Aeropuerto Miguel Alemán Valdés	Towards the Toluca International Airport
State of Mexico	Lerma	2.5	4	Libramiento Nororiente de Toluca	
State of Mexico	Lerma	3.1	5	Cerrillo toll plaza	Start of the toll section
State of Mexico	Lerma	6.2	10	State Highway 36 near San Nicolás Peralta	San Nicolás toll plaza on expressway entry
State of Mexico	Huixquilucan	15.4	24.8	La Glorieta / Santa Cruz Ayotuxco	Ayotuxco toll plaza on expressway entry
State of Mexico	Huixquilucan	19.2	30.9	Túnel Chimalpa I	
State of Mexico	Huixquilucan	19.7	31.7	Puente Chimalpa I	
State of Mexico	Huixquilucan	19.8	31.8	Túnel Chimalpa II	
State of Mexico	Huixquilucan	20.4	32.9	Puente La Concordia (Note: The tallest bridge in the State of Mexico, at 115 meters high)	
State of Mexico	Huixquilucan	21.1	34	Runaway truck ramp	West-east direction only
State of Mexico	Naucalpan de Juárez	23.6	38	Chamapa toll plaza	Last toll plaza before the end in the Autopista Chamapa-Lechería
State of Mexico	Naucalpan de Juárez	24.3	39.2	Autopista Chamapa–Lechería (Fed. 57D)	Eastern terminus with Federal Highway 134 (Carretera Libre)
1.000 mi = 1.609 km; 1.000 km = 0.621 mi Indicates toll road or toll collection point Indicates runaway truck ramp

== See also ==
- Roads in Mexico
