= Libramiento Nororiente de Toluca =

Toll bypass highway around the Toluca metropolitan area

Libramiento Nororiente de Toluca
- Libramiento Ruta de la Independencia Bicentenario
- Libramiento Nororiente de Toluca highlighted in red

Route information
- Maintained by Sistema de Autopistas, Aeropuertos, Servicios Conexos y Auxiliares del Estado de México (SAASCAEM)
- Length: 30.8 km (19.1 mi)
- Existed: September 2007 (First stage); November 2010 (Second stage)–present

Major junctions
- South end: Autopista México–Toluca and Carretera Lerma–Tenango in Lerma
- Autopista Toluca–Naucalpan; Avenida López Portillo; Carretera Toluca–Temoaya
- West/North end: Autopista Toluca–Atlacomulco and Autopista Toluca–Zitácuaro in Toluca

Location
- Country: Mexico
- State: México
- Municipalities: Lerma; Toluca; Xonacatlán; Otzolotepec; Temoaya

Highway system
- Expressways of Mexico

Secondary characteristics
- Identifier: MEX A-6D (State Highway A-6D)
- Speed limit
- Number of lanes: 4 (2 per direction)
- Toll plazas: Xonacatlán
- Maintained by: Sistema de Autopistas, Aeropuertos, Servicios Conexos y Auxiliares del Estado de México (SAASCAEM)
- Concessionaire: PINFRA (Promotora y Operadora de Infraestructura)
- Network: Expressways of Mexico

The Libramiento Nororiente de Toluca (English: Toluca Northeast Bypass), also known as the Libramiento Ruta de la Independencia Bicentenario (English: Bicentennial Independence Route Bypass) is a 30.8-kilometer toll road that bypasses the metropolitan area of the capital of the State of Mexico. It connects the northern area of the Toluca Valley —beginning at the interchange with the Autopista Toluca–Atlacomulco (Federal Highway 55D)— with the eastern area, connecting directly with the Autopista and Carretera Libre México–Toluca (Federal Highway 15D and 15), and with the Carretera Lerma–Tenango (State Highway A10D) near the municipality of Lerma and Boulevard Aeropuerto.

== History ==
In December 2003, the Government of the State of Mexico formally granted a concession title for an original period of 30 years to the company CFC for the construction, operation, exploitation, conservation, and maintenance of the Libramiento Nororiente de Toluca.

In the second half of 2005, construction began on the Libramiento Nororiente de Toluca in a first stage of two lanes. Financing was provided by IDEAL, and by September 2007 the first stage was completed.

In February 2009, the second stage began, in which the existing two-lane road was widened to four lanes; this stage entered into operation in November 2010.

Following the inauguration of the Autopista Toluca–Naucalpan in October 2020, the road gained strategic importance due to its function as a bypass around the city of Toluca, and its various key connections such as the Lic. Adolfo López Mateos International Airport and Federal Highway 55D.

== Route ==
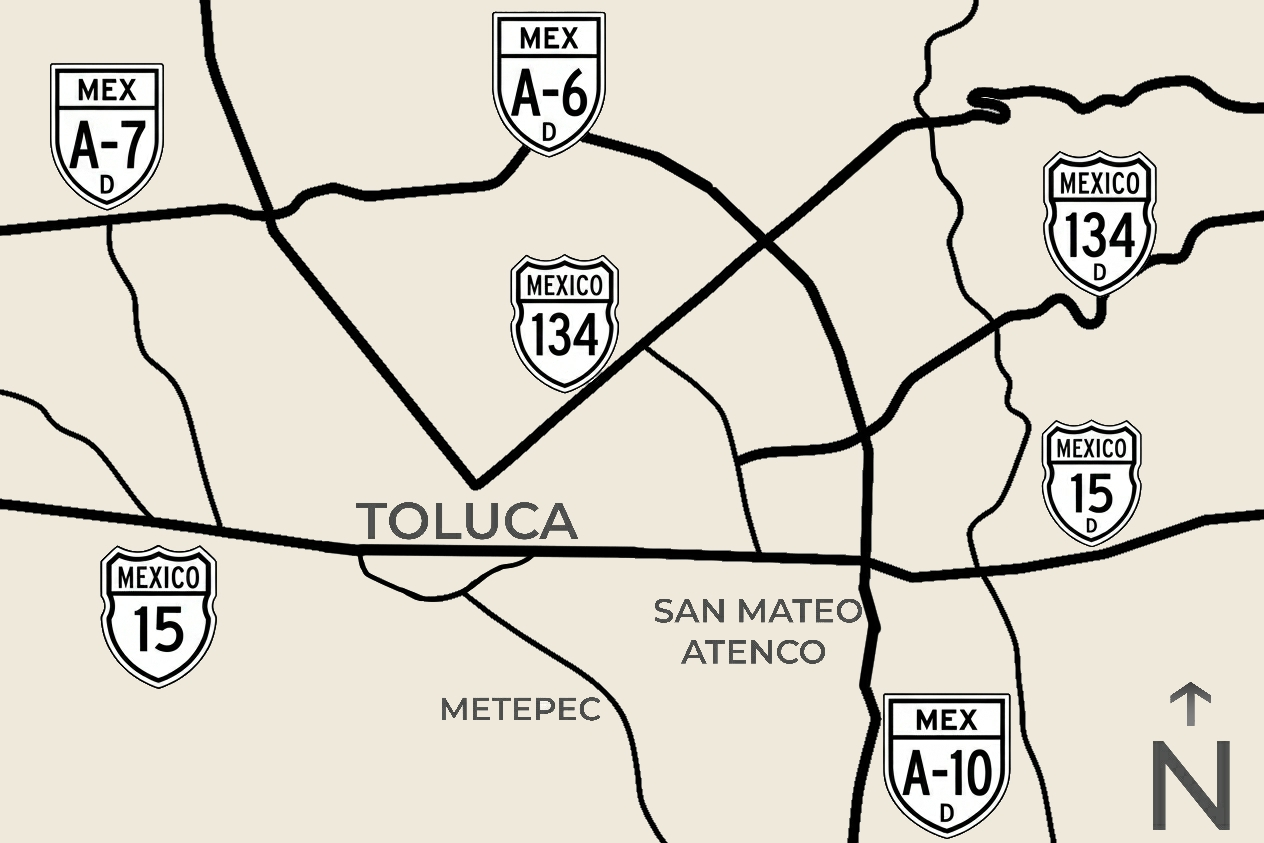
Toluca road network. The one marked as "MEX A-6D" is the Libramiento Nororiente.

The Libramiento Nororiente de Toluca begins in the municipality of Lerma, in the eastern part of the Toluca Valley, specifically at the interchange with Federal Highway 15D (Autopista México–Toluca section), together with the Carretera Lerma–Tenango (State Highway A-10D). From this starting point, the toll expressway advances in a northwesterly direction, passing through the State of Mexico municipalities of Lerma, Toluca, Xonacatlán, Otzolotepec, and Temoaya.

Within the municipality of Toluca, the road features a major interchange where it crosses the Autopista Toluca–Naucalpan. This junction is fundamental to regional mobility, as it facilitates a direct connection to the Lic. Adolfo López Mateos International Airport and the western ZMVM.

The road also intersects with the Carretera Toluca–Temoaya (State Highway 53) and Federal Highway 134 (Carretera Libre Toluca–Naucalpan), serving as local exits to surrounding communities.

Finally, after a journey of approximately 30 kilometers, the bypass concludes to the north of the state capital at its interchange with the Autopista Toluca–Atlacomulco (part of Federal Highway 55D). In this way, the road fulfills its primary function as a ring road, allowing long-distance traffic to bypass the urban area of Toluca and connect the center with the northern part of the country.

=== Characteristics ===
The Libramiento Nororiente de Toluca passes through the State of Mexico municipalities of Lerma, Toluca, Xonacatlán, and Temoaya. Along its more than 30 kilometers, the road runs predominantly across the flatlands of the Toluca Valley, functioning technically as a ring road designed to bypass the urban sprawl of the state capital. By avoiding the highest-traffic metropolitan zones, it allows long-distance traffic to flow freely, achieving a continuous and efficient connection between the Autopista México–Toluca to the east and the highway corridor toward Atlacomulco to the north.

=== Importance ===
The Libramiento Nororiente de Toluca is a road of considerable importance owing to its connections with routes such as the Autopista Toluca–Naucalpan, its proximity to the Lic. Adolfo López Mateos International Airport, and its function as a ring road around Toluca. It is heavily used by trucks, buses, and automobiles travelling to the northern area (Atlacomulco) or seeking access to the Valley of Mexico via the Autopista Toluca–Naucalpan.

== Major intersections ==
| State | Municipality | km | Destinations | Notes |
|---|---|---|---|---|
| State of Mexico | Lerma | 0 | Carretera Lerma–Tenango and Autopista México–Toluca | South terminus |
| State of Mexico | Lerma | 5.5 | Autopista Toluca–Naucalpan | |
| State of Mexico | Xonacatlán | 11 | Xonacatlán toll plaza | Main toll collection point |
| State of Mexico | Xonacatlán | 12 | Federal Highway 134 (Carretera Libre Toluca–Naucalpan) | |
| State of Mexico | Otzolotepec | 15 | PIV Villa Cuauhtémoc | Local overpass |
| State of Mexico | Temoaya | 20 | Carretera Toluca–Temoaya | |
| State of Mexico | Toluca | 29 | PSV San Cayetano | Local underpass |
| State of Mexico | Toluca | 30 | Autopista Toluca–Atlacomulco and Autopista Toluca–Zitácuaro | Western/northern terminus |
Indicates toll road or toll collection point

== See also ==
- Roads in Mexico
