= Alfredo del Mazo =

Alfredo del Mazo may refer to any of these politicians:

- Alfredo del Mazo Vélez (1904–1975), Governor of the State of Mexico from 1945 to 1951
- Alfredo del Mazo González (1943–2019), Governor of the State of Mexico from 1981 to 1986
- Alfredo del Mazo Maza (born 1975), Governor of the State of Mexico from 2017 to 2023
