= 18th federal electoral district of the State of Mexico =

Federal electoral district of Mexico

State of Mexico's 18th
- Electoral district of the Chamber of Deputies of Mexico

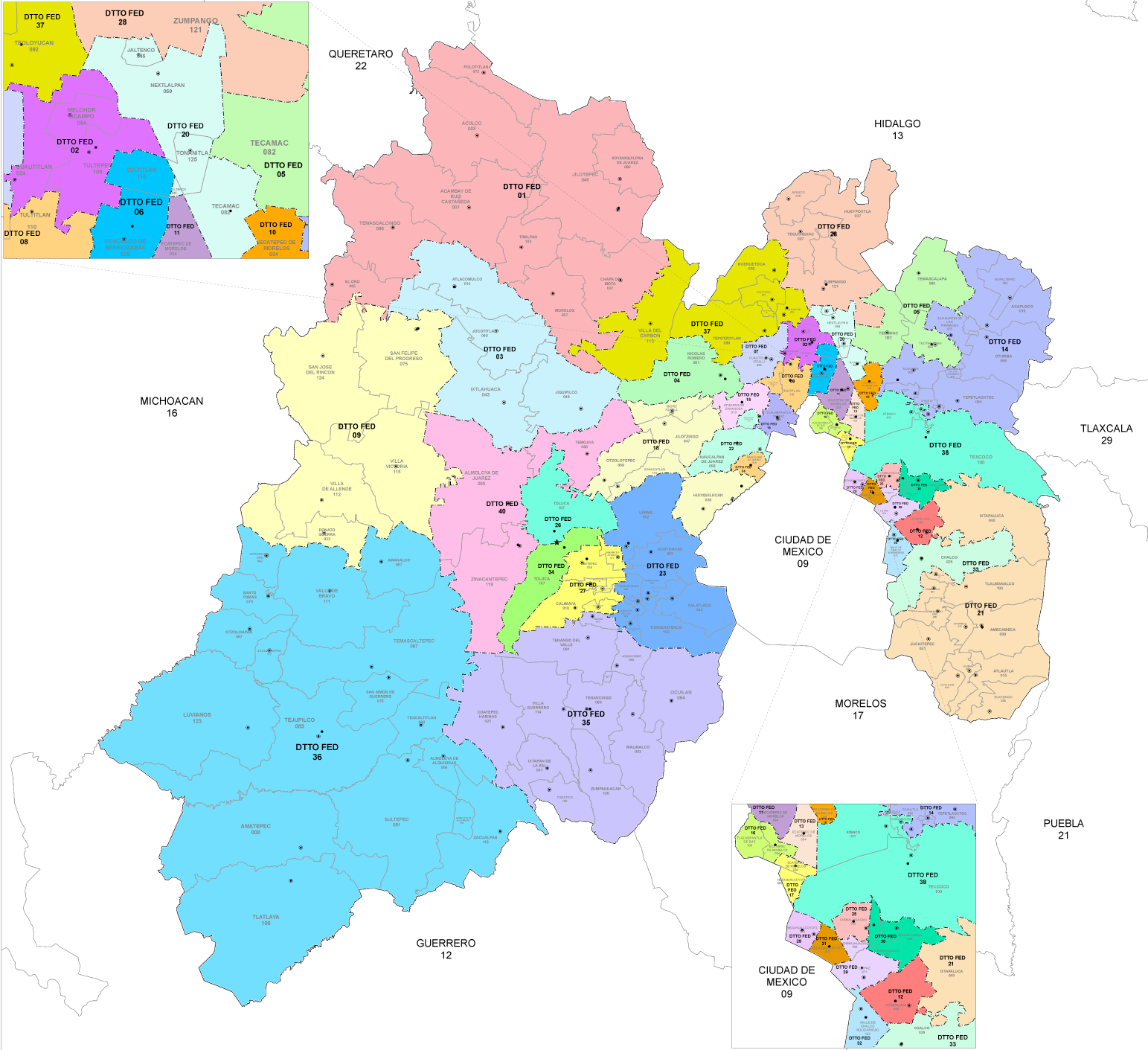
- State of Mexico's districts since 2023

Incumbent
- Member: Claudia Sánchez Juárez
- Party: ▌Ecologist Green Party
- Congress: 66th (2024–2027)

District
- State: State of Mexico
- Head town: Huixquilucan de Degollado
- Coordinates: 19°21′N 99°21′W
- Covers: Huixquilucan, Isidro Fabela, Jilotzingo, Xonacatlán, Otzolotepec
- PR region: Fifth
- Precincts: 135
- Population: 473,788 (2020 census)

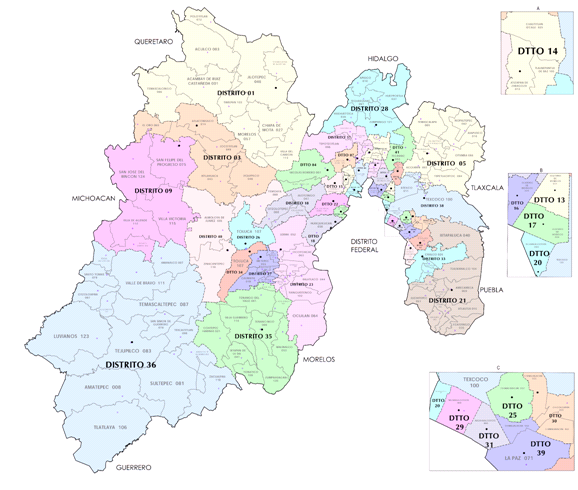
2017–2022 districting scheme

The 18th federal electoral district of the State of Mexico (Spanish: Distrito electoral federal 18 del Estado de México) is one of the 300 electoral districts into which Mexico is divided for elections to the federal Chamber of Deputies and one of 40 such districts in the State of Mexico.

It elects one deputy to the lower house of Congress for each three-year legislative session by means of the first-past-the-post system. Votes cast in the district also count towards the calculation of proportional representation ("plurinominal") deputies elected from the fifth region.

The 18th district was created by the 1977 electoral reforms, which increased the number of single-member seats in the Chamber of Deputies from 196 to 300. Under that plan, the State of Mexico's seat allocation rose from 15 to 34. The new districts were first contended in the 1979 mid-term election.

The current member for the district, elected in the 2024 general election, is Claudia Sánchez Juárez of the Ecologist Green Party of Mexico (PVEM).

== District territory ==
Under the 2023 districting plan adopted by the National Electoral Institute (INE), which is to be used for the 2024, 2027 and 2030 federal elections, the 18th district covers 135 electoral precincts (secciones electorales) across five of the state's 125 municipalities:

- Huixquilucan, Isidro Fabela, Jilotzingo, Xonacatlán and Otzolotepec (except for its extreme western portion, which belongs to the 40th district).

The head town (cabecera distrital), where results from individual polling stations are gathered together and tallied, is the city of Huixquilucan de Degollado. In the 2020 census, the district reported a total population of 473,788.

== Previous districting schemes ==
Evolution of electoral district numbers
| | 1974 | 1978 | 1996 | 2005 | 2017 | 2023 |
|---|---|---|---|---|---|---|
| State of Mexico | 15 | 34 | 36 | 40 | 41 | 40 |
| Chamber of Deputies | 196 | 300 | | | | |

Under the previous districting plans enacted by the INE and its predecessors, the 18th district was situated as follows:

2017–2022

The municipalities of Huixquilucan, Jilotzingo, Otzolotepec and Xonacatlán. The head town was at Huixquilucan de Degollado.

2005–2017

The municipalities of Huixquilucan, Isidro Fabela, Jilotzingo, Lerma and Xonacatlán. The head town was at Huixquilucan de Degollado.

1996–2005

The municipalities of Huixquilucan, Jilotzingo, Otzolotepec and Xonacatlán. The head town was at Huixquilucan de Degollado.

1978–1996

A portion of Naucalpan de Juárez.

== Deputies returned to Congress ==
(Mexico) National parties
- Current
- PAN
- PRI
- PT
- PVEM
- MC
- Morena
- PAZ
- Somos
- Defunct or local only
- PLM
- PNR
- PRM
- PNM
- PP
- PPS
- PARM
- PFCRN
- CON
- PANAL
- PSD
- PES
- PES
- PRD

State of Mexico's 18th district
| Election | Deputy | Party | Term | Legislature |
|---|---|---|---|---|
| 1979 | Enrique Jacob Soriano | Institutional Revolutionary Party | 1979–1982 | 51st Congress |
| 1982 | José Armando Gordillo Mandujano | National Action Party (Mexico) | 1982–1985 | 52nd Congress |
| 1985 | Amado Olvera Castillo | National Action Party (Mexico) | 1985–1988 | 53rd Congress |
| 1988 | Astolfo Vicencio Tovar | National Action Party (Mexico) | 1988–1991 | 54th Congress |
| 1991 | Francisco Gárate Chapa | National Action Party (Mexico) | 1991–1994 | 55th Congress |
| 1994 | Salvador Ávila Zúñiga | National Action Party (Mexico) | 1994–1997 | 56th Congress |
| 1997 | Raúl Martínez Almazán | Institutional Revolutionary Party | 1997–2000 | 57th Congress |
| 2000 | Alejandro Enrique Gutiérrez Gutiérrez | National Action Party (Mexico) | 2000–2003 | 58th Congress |
| 2003 | Félix Adrián Fuentes Villalobos | Ecologist Green Party of Mexico | 2003–2006 | 59th Congress |
| 2006 | Claudia Sánchez Juárez | National Action Party (Mexico) | 2006–2009 | 60th Congress |
| 2009 | Alfonso Navarrete Prida | Institutional Revolutionary Party | 2009–2012 | 61st Congress |
| 2012 | Fernando Maldonado Hernández | Institutional Revolutionary Party | 2012–2015 | 62nd Congress |
| 2015 | Alfredo del Mazo Maza (Note: Del Mazo Maza requested a leave of absence from his seat on 26 Jan 2017 to contend (successfully) for the governorship. His alternate, Ramírez Ponce, was sworn in on 2 Feb 2017.); Miguel Ángel Ramírez Ponce | Institutional Revolutionary Party | 2015–2017; 2017–2018 | 63rd Congress |
| 2018 | Claudia Reyes Montiel | Party of the Democratic Revolution | 2018–2021 | 64th Congress |
| 2021 | José Antonio García García (Note: Originally elected for the PAN, García García joined the Morena benches in August 2023.) | National Action Party (Mexico) National Regeneration Movement | 2021–2024 | 65th Congress |
| 2024 (Note: The opposition coalition (PAN-PRI-PRD) was represented by 2012 presidential candidate Josefina Vázquez Mota.) | Claudia Sánchez Juárez | Ecologist Green Party of Mexico | 2024–2027 | 66th Congress |

== Presidential elections ==
State of Mexico's 18th district
| Election | District won by | Party or coalition | % |
|---|---|---|---|
| 2018 | Andrés Manuel López Obrador | Juntos Haremos Historia | 43.7949 |
| 2024 | Claudia Sheinbaum Pardo | Sigamos Haciendo Historia | 49.9239 |
