= Statue of Andrés Manuel López Obrador =

Sculpture of the 65th president of Mexico

- Estatua de Andrés Manuel López Obrador (Spanish)
- The statue after its inauguration
- Former location
- Year: 2021
- Medium: Pink limestone
- Subject: Andrés Manuel López Obrador
- Dimensions: 1.8 m (5.9 ft)
- Condition: Destroyed
- Location: Atlacomulco, State of Mexico; 19°48′19.5″N 99°52′24.5″W

The statue of Andrés Manuel López Obrador (Note: Spanish: Estatua de Andrés Manuel López Obrador.) was a limestone sculpture depicting Mexico's 65th president. It was installed on 29 December 2021 at the intersection of Isidro Fabela Avenue and Circuito José Jiménez Cantú in the municipality of Atlacomulco, State of Mexico. The installation was ordered by Roberto Téllez Monroy, the outgoing municipal president and a member of the National Regeneration Movement (MORENA), the political party founded by López Obrador.

The statue was toppled and destroyed by unidentified individuals in the early morning of 1 January 2022 (New Year's Day). Téllez Monroy would file a complaint for vandalism.

== History, installation and destruction ==
Roberto Téllez Monroy served as the mayor of Atlacomulco, State of Mexico, from 1 January 2018 to 31 December 2021. He was elected to govern as a representative of the National Regeneration Movement (MORENA) political party founded by Andrés Manuel López Obrador (commonly known as AMLO), president of Mexico from 2018 to 2024. On 29 December 2021, Téllez Monroy installed a statue in honor of AMLO. He claimed to have paid for the sculpture with his own funds—MX$50,000 Mexican pesos (approximately US$2,400)—instead of using public money. However, the statue's cost was ultimately charged to the municipal treasury so that it would remain public property.

Téllez Monroy explained that the statue was intended to "break stigmas and paradigms" and to allow people to recognize López Obrador's achievements. He described it as a tribute to the president of the republic. (Note: Original text in Spanish: "romper los estigmas y paradigmas y que la gente reconozca lo que se hizo. Es un reconocimiento al presidente de la República".) Notably, Téllez Monroy was the first non-Institutional Revolutionary Party (PRI) politician to govern the municipality. Atlacomulco has long been associated with the political group of the same name, known for producing several governors, all of whom were born or raised in the area.

In addition to the statue of López Obrador, a bust of Emiliano Zapata was installed behind it as part of the monument. It was accompanied by a quote attributed to Zapata: "Whoever wants to be an eagle should fly, whoever wants to be a worm should crawl, but should not cry when they are stepped on".

Early on 1 January 2022 (New Year's Day), as the administration of Roberto Téllez Monroy transitioned to that of his successor, Marisol Arias Flores, a representative of the opposition coalition Va por México (which includes the PRI as an ally), the statue was toppled and destroyed by unidentified individuals. The head and legs of the statue were reported missing.

According to Téllez Monroy, neighbors reported that the streetlights at the site were turned off around the time the statue was toppled. He also noted that the security camera recording the statue was not functioning. Téllez Monroy filed a complaint with the state prosecutor's office for vandalism. As of April 2022, the remains of the statue were still under local security custody, as they had not been claimed. The investigation, however, had reportedly stalled.

== Description ==
The statue, sculpted by citizens of Tlalpujahua, Michoacán, stood 1.8 meters (5 ft 11 in) tall and made of pink limestone. Its concrete pedestal bore a plaque with a typographical error, featuring the inscription in all caps:

Andres [sic] Manuel López Obrador

Presidente de México
2018–2024

== Reception ==
Former president of Mexico, Felipe Calderón, commented that the statue's installation exemplified the essence of the "Fourth Transformation", López Obrador's political platform. He drew a comparison to the previous phases of the PRI: the National Revolutionary Party, the Party of the Mexican Revolution, and the PRI itself, arguing that MORENA represents a new iteration of the same legacy. Calderón added, "Each stage has had the living statue of its maximum leader. Furthermore... in Atlacomulco".

Following the statue's destruction, approximately 20 people gathered in protest outside the municipal palace. Diego Fernández de Cevallos sarcastically remarked that López Obrador had "destroyed the statue himself", alluding to the president's earlier pledge to leave "not a stone set upon another".

=== López Obrador on monuments ===
On 2 October 2019, and 10 September 2020, López Obrador stated that he did not want streets, neighborhoods, statues, or monuments bearing his name or likeness, as he believed it was no longer a time for personality cults. On 3 January 2022, he acknowledged the statue but reaffirmed his position against such monuments.

== See also ==
- Statue of Felipe Calderón
