= Atlacomulco Group =

Alleged Mexican political organization

The Atlacomulco Group (Spanish: Grupo Atlacomulco) is an alleged Mexican political organization made up of powerful political figures within the Institutional Revolutionary Party (PRI), which has denied its existence. The group is alleged to be based in Atlacomulco and to have been very influential in the politics of Mexico State and the federal government. However, the most influential people linked to the group, such as Isidro Fabela, Carlos Hank González, Enrique Peña Nieto and Arturo Montiel have denied its existence or refused to confirm its existence. The group was considered to be one of the pillars of the PRI.

== Origins ==
The name "Grupo Atlacomulco" was first used in local newspaper reports discussing "men from Atlacomulco" who were beginning to dominate state and federal political posts. It is claimed that the group has its origins with the political connections of Maximino Montiel Olmos, the grand-uncle of Arturo Montiel Rojas, and to people like Lucindo Cárdenas, Rafael Suárez Ocaña, and Silviano Díaz Cid. However, the group, as a widespread political force, was established by Isidro Fabela. Fabela was governor of Mexico State from 1942 to 1945 during which he started an educational movement, which culminated in the Insitituto Cientifico Literario, now the Universidad Autónoma del Estado de México. He also founded several newspapers and was one of the founding members of the Ateneo de la Juventud.

The group has operated mostly to get its members into high positions in state and the federal governments. Fabela was instrumental in the political rise of Salvador Sánchez Colín, Alfredo del Mazo Vélez, and Carlos Hank González in the 1950s to the 1970s. At one point in the 20th century, the group had members in various state governments in central Mexico and occupied key positions in the federal government. In Mexico State, it is estimated that 80% of government posts were held by members. The group's influence even had one of its members nominated becoming the first bishop of Toluca in the 1950s. However, the group's influence began to diminish in the 1980s with the waning of the Institutional Revolutionary Party. With the death of Hank in 2001, the group is now supposed to be leaderless even though it is still alleged to be a strong force in politics and even to have connections to drug trafficking. The ex-president of Mexico (2012-2018) and former governor of the State of Mexico (2005-2011), Enrique Peña Nieto, is rumored to be associated with the group because of his strong political ties with Arturo Montiel, who was a candidate for the PRI presidential nomination in 1999 but lost because of scandal. He is now considered to be the most important person in the group.

The Coordinator of Special Procedures of the United Nations Human Rights Council, Santiago Corcuera, has accused Atlacomulco of working against human rights in Mexico by arguing against implementing human rights guarantees to groups such as criminals and women.
