= Claudia Sánchez Juárez =

Mexican politician (born 1979)

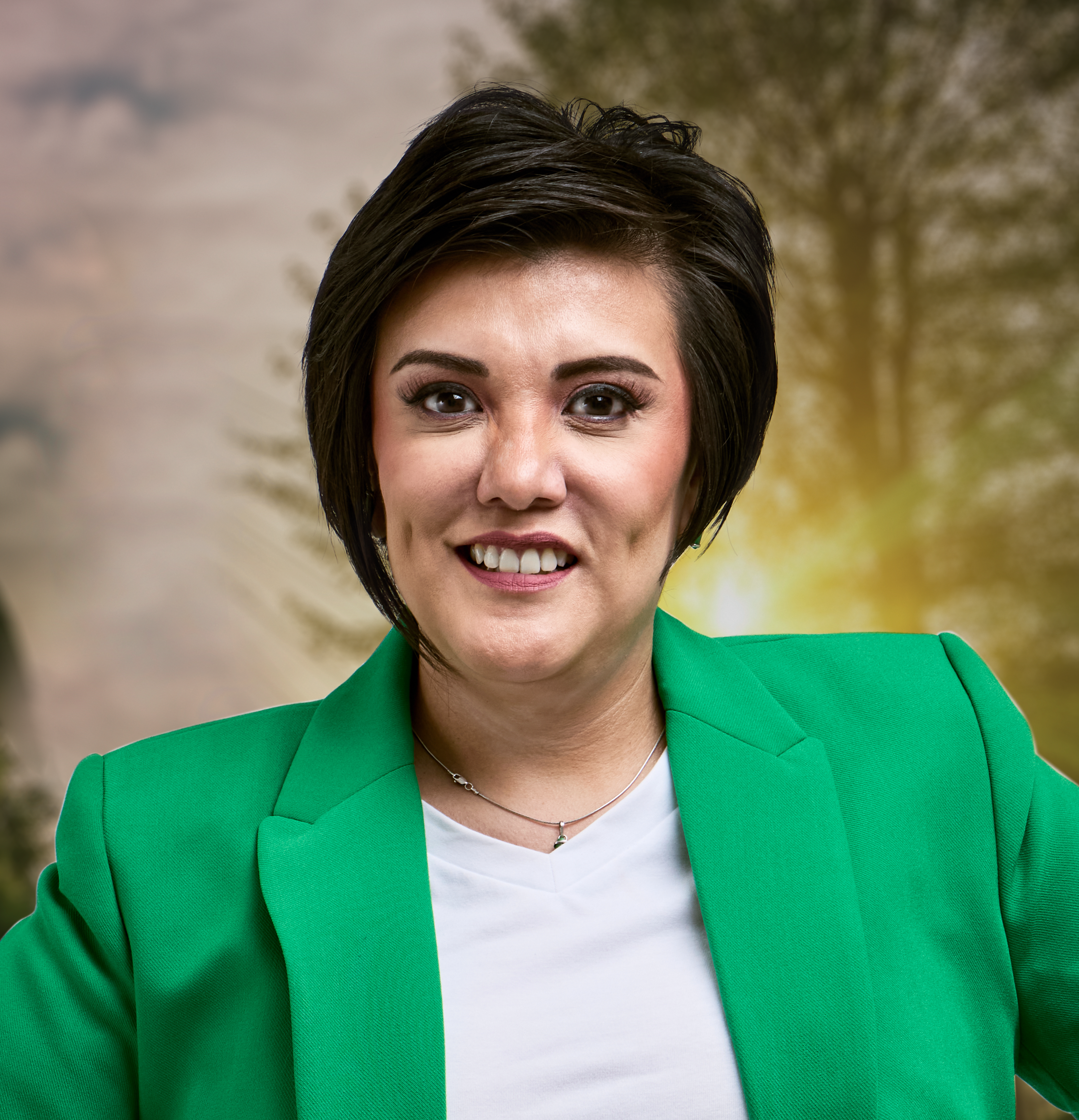
- Born: 4 November 1979 (age 46); Palmar de Bravo, Puebla, Mexico
- Occupation: Politician
- Political party: PAN, PVEM

Claudia Sánchez Juárez (Note: In this Mexican name, the surname is Sánchez and the second or maternal family name is Juárez.) (born 4 November 1979) is a Mexican politician. She has been affiliated with both the National Action Party (PAN) and the Ecologist Green Party of Mexico (PVEM) and has represented both parties in the Congress of the Union.

== Biography ==
Sánchez Juárez was born in Palmar de Bravo, Puebla, in 1979. She holds a law degree from the National Autonomous University of Mexico (UNAM) and has also worked as a radio presenter.

In the 2006 general election she was elected to the Chamber of Deputies to represent the State of Mexico's 18th district (Huixquilucan) for the PAN. She ran for municipal president of Huixquilucan in 2009, but lost to Alfredo del Mazo Maza of the Institutional Revolutionary Party (PRI). She returned to Congress for the PAN in the 2015 mid-terms as a plurinominal deputy.

In March 2024 she resigned her membership in the PAN and joined the Ecologist Green Party (PVEM). In the 2024 general election she was re-elected to Congress for the State of Mexico's 18th district on the PVEM ticket, in a contest in which she narrowly beat the PAN-PRI-PRD coalition's candidate, 2012 presidential contender Josefina Vázquez Mota.
