= Universidad Tecnológica de México =

Mexican private university

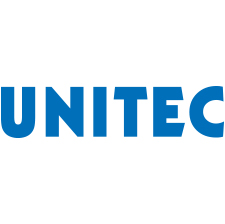
- Motto: Ciencia y Técnica con Humanismo (Science and Technique with Humanism)
- Type: Private University
- Established: 1966
- President: Alejandro Montano Durán
- Administrative staff: 5,000
- Students: 90,050 (2017)
- Location: Mexico City Toluca León Guadalajara Querétaro, Mexico City State of Mexico Guanajuato Jalisco Querétaro, Mexico
- Campus: Urban
- Colors: Blue, white & black
- Mascot: Eagle
- Website: Official

The Universidad Tecnológica de México (UNITEC) (Technological University of México) is a private university located in Mexico City, with campuses in the states of Guanajuato, Jalisco, México, and Querétaro. It offers high school, bachelor, and postgraduate programs. Founded in 1966 by Ignacio Guerra Pellegaud, it is part of the Laureate International Universities Network since 2008. The UNITEC has 10 campuses: Cuitláhuac, Marina and Sur in Mexico City; Atizapán, Ecatepec, Los Reyes, and Toluca in the State of Mexico; Leon in the State of Guanajuato; Guadalajara in the State of Jalisco; and Querétaro in the State of Querétaro. Additionally, it has an Online Campus. UNITEC's total enrollment is higher than 90,000; more than 64,000 students are concentrated in the campuses of the Mexico City Metropolitan Area, which makes it the largest private university in this country region.

== History ==
=== Before Laureate ===
UNITEC was founded in 1966 by a group of Mexican entrepreneurs committed to the development and progress of the country. Its activities began with the bachelor's degrees of Business Administration and Public Accounting

=== Campuses ===
==== Marina Campus (Mexico City) ====
In 1968, the first campus of the university was opened in the building located, up to this day, in Avenida Marina Nacional 162, Col. Anáhuac I Sección, 11320 Ciudad de México, which is now part of the Marina-Cuitláhuac Campus.

In 1975 started teaching the bachelor's degrees of Business administration, Marketing, Finance and Economics, consolidating the Economic-Administrative Sciences area; a year later the Postgraduate Studies Division was created, teaching postgraduate specializations of Marketing, Human resources Administration, Financial Administration and Industrial Operations.

==== Dentistry Clinic ====
In 1970, the bachelor's degree in Dental Surgeon was created, a program that gives distinction to the university. This year UNITEC had also the first generation of graduates.

In 2003, the new Dentistry Clinic was inaugurated whose facilities are nowadays a vanguard model in dental technology and education. With this infrastructure and through its service to the community, it offers diagnostic, emergency, and radiology services; as well as surgical, reconstructive, and rehabilitation care; and pediatric care, endodontics and orthodontics.

To perform dental care, an instructor supervises every five students. As part of the preparation of the students, from the first semester students practice with artificial teeth, models and simulators. During the second semester, they make inroads in the Dentistry Clinic, performing cleaning and prophylaxis. In the third semester, they extend the practice in the endodontics and the dental surgery to perform cavities. From the sixth semester, they have access to the comprehensive clinic.

The Faculty of Dentistry was the first private university to obtain certification from the National Council of Dental Education (CONAEDO) by exceeding the necessary academic and clinical standards.

==== Cuitláhuac Campus (Mexico City) ====
This campus opened in 1990, in street Norte 67, San Salvador Xochimanca neighborhood. By 1994, its facilities were completed in their entirety with six buildings. With this campus, it establishes for the first time the School of Engineering with the bachelor's degrees of Civil Engineering, Electrical engineering, Electronics and Communications Engineering, Industrial and Systems Engineering, Mechanical Engineering, and Chemical engineering, as well as Architecture and Graphic design. At the same time, the high school program was reopened. In January and September 1992, it was added the Computer Systems Engineering and the bachelor's degree of Administrative Computing.

==== Sur Campus (Mexico City) ====
Opened on 25 August 1997 for High School, bachelor, postgraduate programs, and continuing education. The campus was built on an area of 23,000 m^{2}, in which archaeological sites of the Mexican culture were found during its construction.

==== Atizapán Campus (State of Mexico) ====
Inaugurated on 31 August 1999, located in the municipality of Atizapán de Zaragoza, in the State of Mexico, for students of high school programs, bachelor programs, postgraduate studies and continuing education. The campus was built on what used to be an extensive sports club. The first stage of its construction was completed in 1999. Later the buildings of the campus were completed having a capacity of around 12,000 students.

==== Ecatepec Campus (State of Mexico) ====
Opened on 30 September 2002, located in the State of Mexico, teaching high school and 12 bachelor's degree programs.

==== Zapopan Campus (State of Jalisco) ====
In response to the increase in demand, this campus began operations in September 2004; it is located in Anillo Periférico Poniente 79000, Jardines del Collí, Zapopan, State of Jalisco. In 2008, this campus ceased to be part of UNITEC.

==== Campus Cumbres (State of Nuevo León) ====
Opens its doors in September 2004, it is located at Palmas Avenue No. 5500, Cumbres Sector 4, Monterrey, State of Nuevo León. In 2008, this campus ceased to be part of UNITEC.

==== Universidad Americana (Costa Rica) ====
In July 2005, the Pro-Education Consortium, a Mexican private educational institution, acquired the Universidad Americana (American University). This consortium was composed by UNITEC in México, as well as Universidad Latina de Costa Rica, Universidad Americana, Instituto Latino de Formación Integral (ILAFORI), and Colegio Latino in Costa Rica. In 2008, this university ceased to be part of UNITEC.

==== INITE ====
From 1996 to 2008, UNITEC through the Educational Technology Research Institute (INITE) developed its own books and didactic notebooks, over 12 years accumulated an approximate of more than 2 million of copies. In July 2008, INITE ceased to be part of UNITEC.

=== From Laureate ===
==== Acquisition ====
In May 2008, Laureate Education Inc. start a purchase process in order to acquire UNITEC, pending the approval of the Federal Competition Commission. Finally, on 8 July 2008, it was announced that the company, through its subsidiary Laureate International Universities, acquired the university belonging to Ignacio Guerra Pellegaud. Because of this, the campuses of Coyoacán, Zapopan and Cumbres of UNITEC became part of the Universidad del Valle de México (UVM).

==== Toluca Campus (State of Mexico) ====
Started operations in 2013 at Paseo Tollocan 701, Santa Ana Tlapaltitlán, Toluca, State of México, offering high school programs, bachelor's degree, and, from 2016, postgraduate programs.

==== León Campus (State of Guanajuato) ====
Leon Campus was inaugurated in September 2015, provides services to the lowland region, it is located on Juan Alonso de Torres East Blvd.1041, San José del Consuelo, León, State of Guanajuato. Its educational offer are high school and bachelor's degree programs.+

==== Guadalajara Campus (State of Jalisco) ====
Guadalajara Campus was inaugurated in September 2016; it is located in Tlaquepaque, Mexico. It is the result of 50 years of experience, more than 160 thousand alumni and more than 80 programs. It is located on Lázaro Cárdenas Street No. 405, Prados Tlaquepaque, San Pedro Tlaquepaque, State of Jalisco. Its educational programs offer are high school and bachelor's degree programs.

==== Querétaro Campus (State of Querétaro) ====
Started operations in September 2017, it is located at Febrero 5, Av. 1412, San Pablo, municipality of Santiago de Querétaro, State of Querétaro. Its educational offer are high school and bachelor's degree programs.

==== Los Reyes Campus (State of Mexico) ====
Los Reyes Campus started operations in September 2018; it is located in the Mexico-Puebla Federal Highway, km 17.5, Los Reyes Acaquilpan, Municipality of La Paz, zip code 56410, in the State of Mexico (next to the Santa Marta subway station).

== Rectors and chief executive officers ==
=== Rectors ===
- Ignacio Guerra Pellegaud (1966–1994)
- Manuel Campuzano Treviño (1994–2002)
- Raúl Méndez Segura (2003–2008)
- Manuel Campuzano Treviño (2008–2017)
- Alejandro Montano Durán (January 2018 – to date)

=== Chief Executive Officers ===
- Manuel Campuzano Treviño (2008 – November 2017)
- Milton Da Rocha Camargo (November 2017 – December 2018)
- Gerardo Santiago Cuetos (January 2019 – to date)

== Academic programs offer and Delivery models ==
Nowadays UNITEC offer three academic delivery models: Traditional, Working-adult (executive) and On-line. It includes 60 academic programs in high school, bachelor's degrees, and postgraduate degrees.

=== High school programs ===
- High school

=== Bachelor Degrees ===
==== Administration and Social Sciences Area ====
- Business Administration
- Communication and Management of Entertainment Enterprises
- Tourism Business Management
- Communication Sciences
- International Business
- Communication and Media
- Public Accounting
- Public Accounting and Finance
- Law
- Economics
- Finance
- Marketing
- Publicity and Digital Marketing
- International Business
- Pedagogy
- Publicity and Media
- International Relations

==== Architecture and Design Area ====
- Architecture
- Graphic Design
- Industrial Design
- Design, Animation and Digital Art
- Digital Design and Animation

==== Engineering Area ====
- Information Technology Management Engineering
- Environmental and Sustainability Engineering
- Civil Engineering
- Business Management Engineering
- Computer Systems Engineering
- Digital Systems and Robotics Engineering
- Software and Networks Engineering
- Telecommunications and Electronics Engineering
- Industrial Engineering and Administration
- Industrial and Systems Engineering
- Mechanical Engineering
- Mechatronics Engineering
- Chemical Engineering

==== Health Sciences Area ====
- Dentistry
- Nursing
- Physiotherapy
- Nutrition
- Psychology

==== International in Tourism and Gastronomy Area ====
- International bachelor's degree in Tourism and Meetings
- Bachelor's degree Gastronomy

=== Master Degrees ===
- Business Administration (MBA)
- Analytics and Business Intelligence
- Law
- Communication Management
- Project Management
- Multimedia Design
- Education
- Hearing Trials
- Migration Systems
- Psychology
- Information Technology Security
- Sustainable Business Development
- Health Organizations Management

=== Dentistry Postgraduate Specializations ===
- Endodontics
- Pediatric Dentistry
- Restoration Dentistry
- Orthodontics
- Periodontology

With these academic programs, UNITEC offers:

- 95 programs by academic model
- 450 programs-campus

== Notable alumni ==
- Eruviel Ávila Villegas - graduated from the bachelor's degree of law. Former Governor of the State of Mexico.

== Business Incubator ==
The program promotes the creation and development of value-added companies for the university community and the public through specialized advisory services, training, mentoring and networking. It mainly serves intermediate and traditional technology projects. It also has the certification of the Ministry of Economy and the National Institute of the Entrepreneur (INADEM) as a Basic Incubators Network. It consists of five incubators located in the Atizapán, Ecatepec, Toluca, Sur and Cuitláhuac campuses. With the support of this network, 80% of the businesses created remain with commercial activities after the first two years of operation, creating sources of employment and offering effective solutions to different problems in the country.

=== James McGuire International contest ===
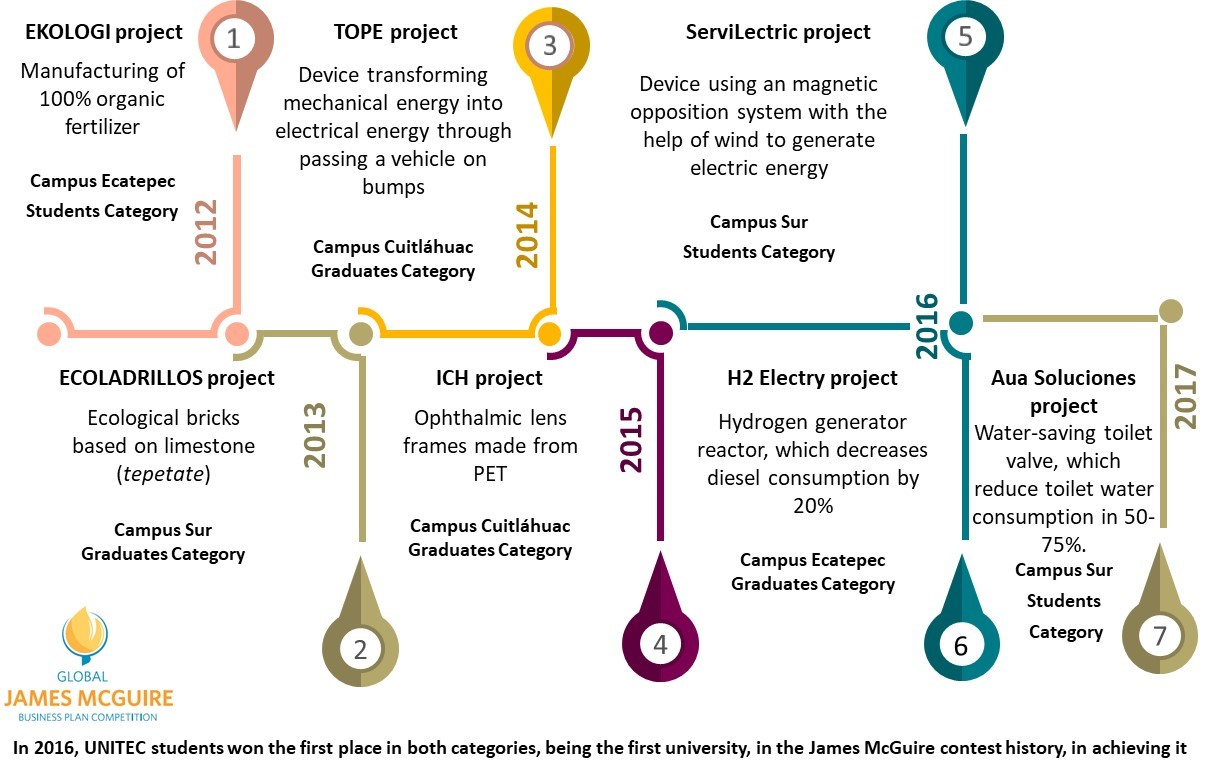
Business Incubator timeline. It describes the proyects that have been incubated in this program.

Since 2012, the business incubator has supported innovative projects whose participants have won the James McGuire Entrepreneurship Contest, which is an international-level competition open to all institutions of the Laureate University Network, and it is intended to support students to realize their business projects. Some of the projects that have won this contest are shown in the following illustration.

== Labor Liaison Center ==
The Labor Liaison Center of UNITEC offers a set of services to promote the insertion of students and graduates in the labor environment:

Students are offered:

- Access to part-time vacancies in the mornings or in the afternoons (for students in terms 1–4)
- Access to vacancies where they can start their professional experience (for students in terms 5 to 9)
- Access to the online work exchange (for advanced students and new graduates)
- Work orientation workshops
- Access to face-to-face job fairs
- Access to virtual job fairs
- Interview simulations
- Review of curriculum vitae

In each campus, there is a Labor Liaison Center where the students receive support:

- From a specialized advisor
- To develop an effective strategy in the job search
- To establish a direct link with the world of work

Additionally, from the campus, the student or graduate can visit the in-plants of talent management companies, such as Adecco, Manpower, Superchamba, OCC, ANIQ, and Compañia de Talento y Probecarios.

== Social Mobility and Employability ==
The International Finance Corporation (IFC), part of the World Bank Group, carried out a study on the employability and social mobility of graduates for UNITEC in 2014 and 2015. The results show the following:

- The employment rate for UNITEC students is 92%, being 5.7 points higher than other private universities
- UNITEC students are hired in their first job in less time once graduated: 4.2 vs. 8.1 months of other private universities
- The labor benefits of UNITEC students are better than other public and private universities
- 27% of UNITEC students have been promoted to managerial positions vs. 18% of the other universities
- 38% of UNITEC students have recently been promoted in their jobs vs. 21% from other private universities.
- The percentage of UNITEC graduates who have experienced positive changes in their socioeconomic level is 30 points higher than that of other private universities (41% vs. 11%).
- 72% of the graduates of UNITEC express positive changes in the prestige offered by their profession with respect to their parents' occupation. 62% from other private universities.

The IPSOS market research company carried out a Study of Graduates in 2015, which yielded the following results:

- 9 out of 10 worked on what they studied
- 95% have professional work
- Earn 29% more than the national average

== Accreditations ==
=== Institutional Accreditation (FIMPES) ===
The Mexican Federation of Private Institutions for Higher Education (Federación Mexicana de Instituciones Particulares de Educación Superior, FIMPES), is a group of particular Mexican institutions that has the purpose of improving communications and collaboration between them. It currently affiliates 109 universities across the country. FIMPES provide accreditations to educational institutions that meet quality standards that guarantee the education of professionals who graduate from them.

The accreditation is related to the improvement of the educational quality in Mexico and with the guarantee that the accredited institutions meet the established standards. This means that the institution has a relevant mission to the context of higher education, and that it has enough resources, programs and services to comply with it.

UNITEC has obtained the highest level of institutional accreditation by FIMPES in 2000, repeated the same accreditation level in 2006 and in 2015. This last accreditation ends in 2022.

=== Accreditation Council for Higher Education (COPAES) ===
The Accreditation Council for Higher Education (COPAES) is a non-profit civil association that acts as the only instance authorized by the Federal Government through the Ministry of Public Education (Secretaria de Educación Pública, SEP), to confer formal recognition and supervise organizations whose purpose is to accredit undergraduate academic programs that are taught in Mexico, in any of its modalities (traditional, on-line and blended).

At present, UNITEC has 49 programs-campus accredited with seven institutions recognized by COPAES, as is shown in the following table.

Accreditation program	Marina-Cuitláhuac	Sur	Atizapán	Ecatepec	Toluca	Total
Business Administration	CACECA	CACECA	CACECA	CACECA	CACECA	5
Marketing	CACECA	CACECA	CACECA	CACECA		4
Public Accounting	CACECA	CACECA	CACECA	CACECA		4
Finance	CACECA	CACECA	CACECA	CACECA	CACECA	5
International Business	CACECA	CACECA	CACECA	CACECA		4
Dentistry Surgeon	CONAEDO					1
Law	CONAED	CONAED	CONAED	CONFEDE		4
Graphic Design	COMAPROD	COMAPROD	COMAPROD	COMAPROD		4
Computer Systems	CONAIC	CONAIC	CONAIC	CONAIC		4
Tourism and Hotel Management	CACECA	CACECA	CACECA	CACECA		4
Communication Sciences	CONAC	CONAC	CONAC	CONAC		4
Pedagogy	CEPPE	CEPPE	CEPPE	CEPPE		4
Nutrition	CONCAPREN	CONCAPREN				2
Total	13	12	11	11	2	49

UNITEC ranked 14 ^{th} nationally among 408 public and private institutions with the highest number of programs-campus accredited by COPAES, and 5 ^{th} place in the Mexico City Metropolitan Area.

=== Reported results by National Center of Higher Education Evaluation (CENEVAL) ===
UNITEC presents superior results to the national average in the levels of satisfactory and outstanding performance of the General Exit Exam (EGEL) of CENEVAL, since 2007.

UNITEC is the 4th university in Mexico with the greatest number of registered programs in EGEL (General Exit Exam) High Performance bachelor's degrees Registry of CENEVAL, with 42 programs-campus from July 2016 – to June 2017.

In the period January–June 2018, UNITEC was ranked 1st in the Mexico City Metropolitan Area and in 3rd position among the first 25 public and private universities nationwide with the largest number of students who received the CENEVAL Award to EGEL Excellence Performance.

=== Recognition of the Ministry of Public Education (Secretaría de Educación Pública, SEP) ===
In September 2002, the UNITEC undergraduate programs received the certificate of enrollment in the Administrative Simplification Program and the Academic Excellence Plans and Programs Registry by the Ministry of Public Education.

UNITEC was the first University in Mexico to obtain the record of Academic Excellence granted by the SEP at the senior and middle levels.

=== Higher Education Institutions Ranking ===
According to the Reader's Digest Selections ranking, which considers three dimensions: infrastructure, prestige and evaluation of professionals, UNITEC is in the TOP 20 of the 100 best universities in Mexico.

== QS Stars Rating ==
The QS Stars ranking is a methodology of Quacquarelli Symond (leading provider of information and solutions for higher education at the global academic of quality assessment) that classifies 2 thousand higher education institutions in 50 countries.

UNITEC has five stars in the following categories:

- Employability
- Teaching
- Online education
- Social responsibility

UNITEC is the first university in Mexico with five QS stars in the online education category.

== Quality certification ISO 9001:2015 ==
UNITEC obtained certification in ISO 9001:2015 for the period 2019–2022 in the process of recruitment, selection, and contracting faculty, granted by the Mexican Institute of Standardization and Certification (Instituto Mexicano de Normalización y Certificación A.C., IMNC).
