= Atlacomulco =

- Municipality
- Location in the State of Mexico

- Location in Mexico
- Coordinates: 19°47′51″N 99°52′28″W
- Country: Mexico
- State: State of Mexico
- Founded: 1530s
- Municipal Status: 1824
- Seat: Atlacomulco de Fabela

Government
  - Municipal president: Marisol Arias Flores (Va por México; 2022–2024)

Area
  - Municipality: 258.74 km^{2} (99.90 sq mi)
- Elevation (of seat): 2,570 m (8,430 ft)

Population (2020)
  - Municipality: 109,384
- Time zone: UTC-6 (Central (US Central))
- Postal code (of seat): 50450
- Area code: 712
- Website: (in Spanish) Official site

Atlacomulco is one of 125 municipalities in the State of Mexico located in the northwest of the State of Mexico in central Mexico, 63 kilometres (39 mi) from the state capital of Toluca. The municipal seat is the city of Atlacomulco de Fabela. The name is derived from the Nahuatl phrase "atlacomulli" which means "where there are wells." The city, with a population of 109,384 is surrounded by rural area in which 75% of the rest of the municipality lives. The municipality has a sizable percentage of indigenous language speakers, mostly Mazahua. The Mazahua name for the area is Embaró, which means "colored rock." Agriculture is still the main economic activity, but the development of a number of industrial parks, such as Atlacomulco 2000, which allowed the seat to reach city statues by 1987. Atlacomulco is also the origin of a political organization called the "Atlacomulco Group" made up of powerful political figures who deny its existence.

== History ==
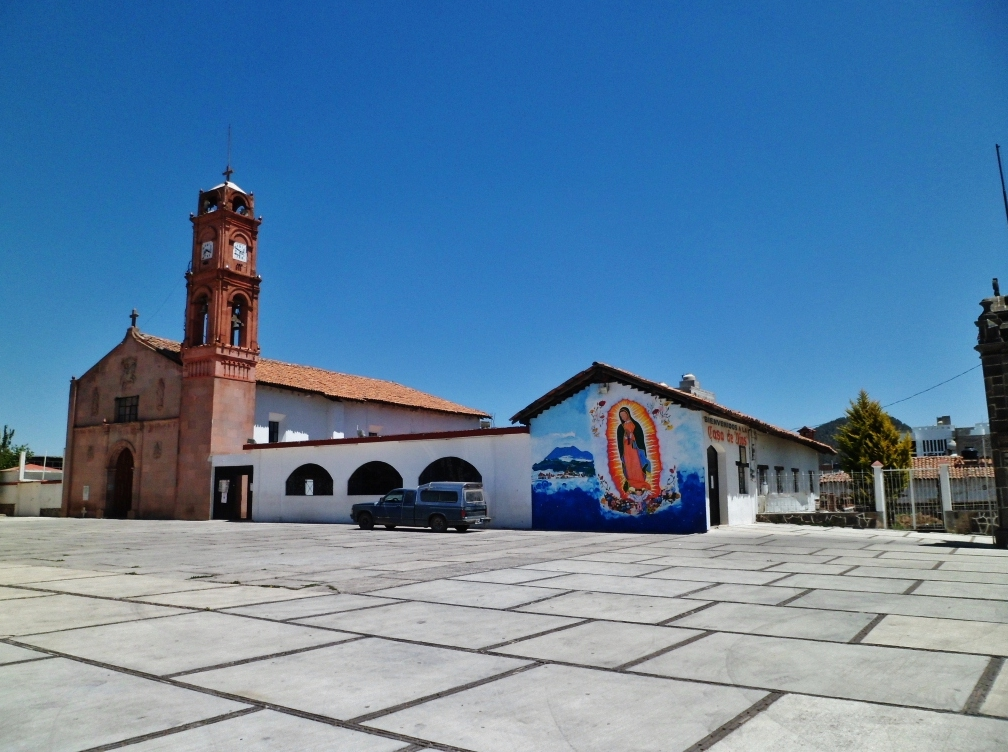
Saint James the Apostle Church in Santiago Acutzilapan, Atlacomulco

The area was originally settled by the Mazahuas but the date of their arrival is not known. This area eventually came under the control of Azcapotzalco during the reign of Tezozomoc, calling it the province of Mazahuacan. Later, it came under the control of Tlacopan or Tacuba. After the Spanish conquest of the Aztec Empire, Atlacomulco became the encomendero of Francisco de Villegas in 1535. In 1537, the regent of Ixtlahuaca took possession of the area, and relocated Spanish families here to settle. The municipality remained quiet through the rest of the colonial period and during the various wars of the 19th century. The only events of note were the passing of the armies of Miguel Hidalgo and Ignacio López Rayón on the edges of the municipality during the Mexican War of Independence.

Atlacomulco officially became a municipality in 1824. During the very late 19th century and early 20th century, Atlacomulco was dominated by a number of large haciendas which include the Toshi Hacienda and the El Salto Hacienda. In 1915, during the Mexican Revolution, Lucio Blanco occupied the city of Atlacomulco with his groups while on his way to the Bajío region. He is known here for sacking almost all of the municipality's grain, as well as printing money which was circulated in the north of Mexico. During this time period, the municipality's most famous resident, Isidro Fabela Alfaro was active as a politician and writer.

During the first half of the 20th century, most of the educational institutions here were established. In 1951, the village gained town status and in 1987, it was declared a city.

== Climate ==
Climate data for Atlacomulco (1991–2020 normals, extremes 1978–present)
| Month | Jan | Feb | Mar | Apr | May | Jun | Jul | Aug | Sep | Oct | Nov | Dec | Year |
|---|---|---|---|---|---|---|---|---|---|---|---|---|---|
| Record high °C (°F) | 24.5 (76.1) | 27 (81) | 30 (86) | 32.5 (90.5) | 33.5 (92.3) | 32 (90) | 29 (84) | 29.5 (85.1) | 31.5 (88.7) | 26 (79) | 26 (79) | 26 (79) | 33.5 (92.3) |
| Mean daily maximum °C (°F) | 19.9 (67.8) | 21.8 (71.2) | 23.8 (74.8) | 25.3 (77.5) | 24.8 (76.6) | 22.9 (73.2) | 21.0 (69.8) | 21.0 (69.8) | 20.7 (69.3) | 20.9 (69.6) | 20.7 (69.3) | 20.4 (68.7) | 21.9 (71.4) |
| Daily mean °C (°F) | 9.3 (48.7) | 11.0 (51.8) | 12.9 (55.2) | 14.8 (58.6) | 15.6 (60.1) | 15.0 (59.0) | 14.1 (57.4) | 14.0 (57.2) | 13.8 (56.8) | 12.9 (55.2) | 11.1 (52.0) | 9.8 (49.6) | 12.9 (55.2) |
| Mean daily minimum °C (°F) | −1.3 (29.7) | 0.1 (32.2) | 2.1 (35.8) | 4.3 (39.7) | 6.4 (43.5) | 7.2 (45.0) | 7.1 (44.8) | 7.1 (44.8) | 6.9 (44.4) | 4.8 (40.6) | 1.6 (34.9) | −0.7 (30.7) | 3.8 (38.8) |
| Record low °C (°F) | −10 (14) | −9 (16) | −7.5 (18.5) | −2.5 (27.5) | −1 (30) | −0.5 (31.1) | 1.5 (34.7) | 1.5 (34.7) | −4 (25) | −5 (23) | −7 (19) | −9 (16) | −10 (14) |
| Average precipitation mm (inches) | 16.5 (0.65) | 19.9 (0.78) | 15.1 (0.59) | 23.7 (0.93) | 52.8 (2.08) | 147.1 (5.79) | 177.2 (6.98) | 157.1 (6.19) | 148.4 (5.84) | 67.0 (2.64) | 29.3 (1.15) | 9.3 (0.37) | 863.4 (33.99) |
| Average precipitation days | 2.6 | 2.8 | 3.0 | 4.1 | 9.0 | 14.8 | 18.4 | 16.8 | 14.2 | 9.0 | 4.2 | 1.9 | 100.8 |
Source: Servicio Meteorológico Nacional

== Government ==
As a municipality, the city of Atlacomulco is the local government for nearly 110 other communities in the area, which cover a territory of 258.74 km^{2}. Only about a quarter of the municipality's population of 77,831 lives in the city proper. The municipality has a large percentage of indigenous peoples for central Mexico, at 20%, compared to 3.8 percent for the rest of the State of Mexico, with 8,820 people speaking a native language as of 2005, with Mazahua dominating. The municipality borders the municipalities of Acambay, Temascalcingo, San Andrés Timilpan, San Bartolo Morelos and El Oro.

The municipality has rugged terrain, filled with mountains and hills. It is located on the Trans-Mexican Volcanic Belt, in the Lakes and Volcanos of Anáhuac region. Principle elevations include Cerro Xitije, Cerro Atlacomulco, Cerro La Cruz and Cerro El Cielito. Its altitude varies from 2720 to 3030 meters above sea level. It is part of the Lerma River basin which crosses the territory, as well as a number of streams and fresh-water springs. There three dams in the area, with the main one being J. Trinidad Fabela. Its climate is fairly moist with most rain falling between June and September. Average high temperature is 19.9°C and average low is 7.4°C.

Most of the vegetation is mixed- and conifer forests, covering about 20% of the municipality. The most common trees include cedars, holm oaks, eucalyptus, ash, strawberry trees, pines, oaks and weeping willows. Wild animals include small and medium-sized mammals such as squirrels, rabbits and foxes as well as reptiles such as chameleons, rattlesnakes and various small lizards. The northern part of the municipality near the Jocotitlán volcano is now a natural reserve where logging is prohibited and reforestation is underway. It is also a state park called the Isidro Fabela State Natural Park.

Near the community of El Salto is the José Trinidad Fabela dam. In the middle of the lake created by the dam is the Isla de las Aves or Island of the Birds. This island is an ecological sanctuary for migratory birds and contains an aviary. Some of the birds kept and bred here are doves, guinea hens, peacocks and storks. Cabin rentals are available for visitors.

Most of the municipality outside the city proper is dedicated to agriculture. Over 90% of what is grown is corn. Other crops include wheat, oats, barley and beans. Livestock is divided mostly among cattle, sheep and domestic fowl. Most of the crops and livestock are produced for auto-consumption. One notable exception is the flower growing region around the locality of San Lorenzo Tlacotepec, which ships fresh flowers to states such as Nuevo León, Coahuila and Tamaulipas. Agriculture employs about one quarter of the population and another quarter is employed by industries. The other half are employed in commerce, tourism and services.

== Notable people ==
- Enrique Peña Nieto, President of Mexico (2012-2018)
- Isidro Fabela
- Arturo Montiel
- Alfredo del Mazo Vélez
- Alfredo del Mazo González
- Alfredo del Mazo Maza

== International relations ==
=== Twin towns – Sister cities ===
Atlacomulco is twinned with:

- Vire, France

== See also ==
- Statue of Andrés Manuel López Obrador, formerly in the municipality
