= Eruviel Ávila =

Mexican politician

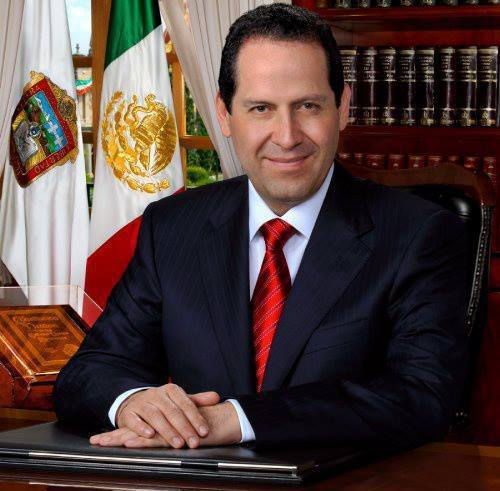
- Villegas in 2009

Governor of the State of Mexico
- In office September 16, 2011 – September 15, 2017
- Preceded by: Enrique Peña Nieto
- Succeeded by: Alfredo del Mazo Maza

President of the National Conference of Governors
- In office July 9, 2015 – February 29, 2016
- Preceded by: Mariano González Zarur
- Succeeded by: Gabino Cué Monteagudo

Mayor of Ecatepec
- In office August 18, 2009 – March 26, 2011
- Preceded by: José Luis Gutiérrez Cureño
- Succeeded by: Indalecio Ríos Velázquez

Personal details
- Born: Eruviel Ávila Villegas; May 1, 1969 (age 57) Ecatepec, México
- Party: Green Ecological Party of Mexico (2023–present); Institutional Revolutionary (1993–2023)
- Education: Universidad Tecnológica de México; National Autonomous University of Mexico

Eruviel Ávila Villegas (born May 1, 1969) is a Mexican politician, member of the Ecologist Green Party and federal deputy in the LXVI Legislature. For the Institutional Revolutionary Party (Partido Revolucionario Institucional, PRI), he was Governor of the State of Mexico from 2011 to 2017 and Mayor of Ecatepec de Morelos twice, from 2003 to 2006 and from 2009 to 2012, and deputy of the State of Mexico's Congress.

== Biography ==
Born at Ecatepec de Morelos in Mexico State, Eruviel Ávila Villegas has a Law bachelor's degree from the Universidad Tecnológica de México (UNITEC), and a Master's and Doctor's degree from the National Autonomous University of Mexico (UNAM).

Ávila Villegas has been a teacher at UNITEC. He is author of the book "The Creation of the Constitutional Court in the State of Mexico" ("La Creación de la Corte Constitucional del Estado de México") published in 2003, a joint publication of the Legislative Investigations Institute of the State of Mexico Congress and the State of Mexico's Public Administration Institute.

From 1994 to 1996, he was secretary of the municipality of Ecatepec de Morelos. He was elected deputy of the State of Mexico Congress twice, from 1997 to 2000 in the LIII Legislature and from 2006 to 2009 in the LVI Legislature, where he was also named Coordinator of the PRI's Parliamentary Group and chairman of the board of Political Coordination.

He was Subsecretary of the State of Mexico's municipal government in Nezahualcóyotl from 2001 to 2002 and PRI's President of the Directive State Council in 2006. He has been elected Mayor of Ecatepec de Morelos for two periods, from 2003 to 2006 and from 2009 to 2012. In 2010 he was elected President of the National Federation of Municipalities (FENAMM), where 1,510 of the country's municipalities are grouped.

On March 26, 2011, he requested license to be excused as Mayor of Ecatepec, and the next day he registered as PRI's candidate for Governor of the State of Mexico.

In 2024 he switched to the Ecologist Green Party of Mexico to support Claudia Sheinbaum's bid for the presidency. He was elected in the LXVI Legislature.

== Trajectory and formation ==
Eruviel Ávila Villegas is a graduated lawyer from the Universidad Tecnológica de México (Unitec) has a master's degree and a doctorate, both in law, from the National Autonomous University of Mexico (UNAM), he's the author from the book "La creación de la Corte Constitucional del Estado de México" a co-publication between the Instituto de Investigaciones Legislativas del Congreso del Estado de México and the Instituto de Administración Pública from the State of Mexico.

He started his political career as Secretary from the local government of Ecatepec Morelos from 1994 to 1996, in two occasions was elected as a congressman for the State of Mexico congress between the years 1997 to 200, and for a second time from 2006 to 2009, where he served as coordinator of the parliamentary group from the Institutional Revolutionary Party and as a president of the Political Coordination Assembly.

Elected as a municipal mayor from Ecatepec twice, from 2003 to 2006, then from 2009 to 2012. Was an undersecretary from the state of Mexico government in Nezahualcoyotl region from 2001 to 2002 and the president of the Comite Direcitvo Estatal from the PRI in 2006.

On March 26, 2011, he requested permission to leave his charge as a municipal mayor from Ecatepec for start a registration as a candidate as governor of the State of Mexico on March 27.

== Governor of State of Mexico ==
=== Health ===
On November 18, 2014, as governor of the State of Mexico, he opened the center "Ciudad de la Salud para la Mujer" in Cautitlan city. This center brings specialized attention to women, offering special attention on geriatrics and maternity, a specialized area on detection and prevention on breast cancer, and psychological help on addiction treatments are given in the center too. Months after it was opened and thanks to the good results, a second center was opened in Huixquilucan on May 11, 2015. The president of Mexico, Enrique Peña Nieto, gave instructions to copy this kind of center for other cities around the country.

On child health, he opened a lactaction bank in different zones around the State of Mexico. The first was the Hospital Materno-Infantil "Mónica Pretelini", opened on January 15, 2013, in Toluca city, the second bank was opened in Chalco called Hospital Materno-Infantil "Josefa Ortiz de Dominguez", it attends more than 9 thousand mothers. After it another one was opened in Naucalpan on August 9, 2013, and after a month 3 more banks were opened in Atlacomulco, Tenancingo and Ecatepec. On June 19, 2013, Eruviel Avila received the award from the International Union against Cancer for the best governmental organization, thanks to his actions on prevention and attention on this decease. By June 2013, the first robotized pharmacy was opened in Cuautitlán city, built to provide exactly dosage and prevent auto medication, after that the Specialized on VIH Center started operations in Ixtapaluca, the first of its kind in the country.

Meanwhile, his administration, the Instituto Materno Infantil del Estado de México gave for the first time an electronic vaccination booklet. In November 2014, the Health Secretary gave to the State of Mexico a certification as the first entity in Mexico free from malaria since the past 25 years.

On June 3, 2015, the first Regional Blood Bank was opened at the Valle de México, where urgencies from west zone and all the Valle de México are attended. Eruviel Ávila was the first blood donor for the bank. A specialized in addictions center (Centro Especializado de Prevención y Rehabilitación de Adicciones) in Metepec city started operating on a July 29, 2015 where they give special treatments for addictions.

=== Social development ===
On August 12, 2012, with the help from the Health Secretary, started the Caravana de la Salud, an initiative where mobile units bring medical attention to the different Estado de Mexico zones in need from health.

Thanks to the "Sistema para el Desarrollo Integral de la Familia" (DIFEM) and the Secretaria de Desarrollo Agropecuario started an initiative called Canastas Alimentarias Hortofruticolas, which was designed to improve the nutrition from poor families and to contribute in the consume of agricultural products, fruits and vegetables of the region.

During Eruviel Avila administration was implemented the "needed divorce", a legal term that facilitated the process of divorce in child abuse inside the family cases, reducing prices for these cases. Centers for Raped Women were implemented for victims of these social problem. For families with just one parent a program called "De la mano con Papá" was developed to bring capacitation, alimentation programs, medical attention and other things.

By the year 2013, a translation in different dialects about the kids and teenager's rights was made with the purpose to expand these rights to natives Mexicans. That same year, was opened the "Procuraduria para la Defensa del Contribuyente" a mechanism in charged to defend and promote the citizen who pay their taxes.

By the end of 2015, the Sistema para el Desarrollo Integral de la Familia from State of Mexico (DIF) inaugurated a special clinic for nutrition called NutriDIF, this center as equipped with the needed technology to optimize different nutrition programs for poor families.

=== Education ===
With the purpose of generate more opportunities for students who try to get into the productive sector; the Estado de Mexico government established in 2011 a dual education model, this kind of educational model is currently used in countries as Germany, Denmark and France among others, all this in order to link students of high school and bachelor's degree with work field via internships in the productive industry.

During the second year of Eruviel Avila's public management was started the program called "10 Actions for Education" which is targeted to students of all educational levels. All the students who meet all the requirements of this program will qualify to benefits as economic support through the card "La Efectiva", school accident insurance, student exchange scholarships, computers, special education support, scholar kits, among others benefits; Another programs have been developed within this actions, for example "Left-handed Students Program" and "Digital Skills for Everyone".

Regarding to educational infrastructure, in 2012 the "Digital University of Estado de Mexico" was inaugurated, this educational center has an educational offer of 26 professional careers, besides the opportunity of study a high school, bachelor or master's degree in prestige educational centers; in May 2015 the "Unidad de Estudios Superiores de Ecatepec (school belonging to Universidad Mexiquense del Bicentenario) opened its doors, nowadays this center has an enrollment of 500 students in careers like Business Management Engineering, Logistics and Distribution Engineering among others. On the other hand, until 2015 were inaugurated 164 of the called "Digital Libraries" in collaboration with "Fundacion Proacceso", "Enova" and State government, this kind of places offers availability of ebooks, audiobooks and internet for free. In 2012 was signed the 'Acuerdo Estratégico por la Educación Media Superior y Superior' en el Edoméx que cuentan con servicio de libros electrónicos, audiolibros e internet de forma gratuita y, hasta 2015, suman 164, which was countersigned in 2015, due to the high number of people who applied and don't achieve enter to Universidad Autonoma del Estado de Mexico, this agreement allows to nine thousand students to enter high school education and four thousand students to University education in one of the more of 400 educational centers along the state.

Also, the program "Apoyo a la Gestion Escolar", which began in May 2013, gives funds to obtain equipment and furniture to kindergarten, elementary and middle schools and grant optimal conditions for students in more of two thousand school along the state.

Few months later, the first stage of "Programa de Infraestructura Prefabricados" started, in this program were invested more of 16 million Mexican pesos to improve infrastructure as toilets, cafeterias, classrooms computing and classrooms in general with prefabricated materials which allow a quick installation besides being double resistant.

In August 2013 the pilot program "Red Escolar de Colaboración y Reforzamiento Educativo Oportuno (RECREO)" was implemented, with this program more of four thousand electronic tablets were delivered to students of elementary schools; the main goal of this program is to monitor the improvement of the students at the same time that technology is introducing to students and teachers of fifth and sixth grade.

In both to strengthen the improvement of children, in November 2013, the Estado de Mexico government launched the program called "Programa por una cultura de vida saludable", through which information about hygiene, nutrition and health is offered by different talks to students of elementary, in addition to this, another goal is to encourage them to play sports with which their quality of life is improved.

In order to identify and combat the scholar bullying in state schools the program "Programa de VAlores por una Convivencia Escolar Armonica" was started, which developed an Anti-bullying training workshop called ZERO, this program was a recommendation for Latin-American countries by the European Union, likewise were developed the "Comites de Convivencia Escolar Armonica de Educacion Media Superior", which are committees specialized with the main objective of generate actions to contribute to change the social environment in the educational centers.

Also the Education Ministry of the state in addition with International Affairs Ministry made available to all Mexican citizens who live in the US the program "Programa de Atencion a Migrantes en Servicios de Control Escolar" in order to make easier via web the process to obtain official documents which support their educational training conducted in any of the Estado de Mexico's schools.

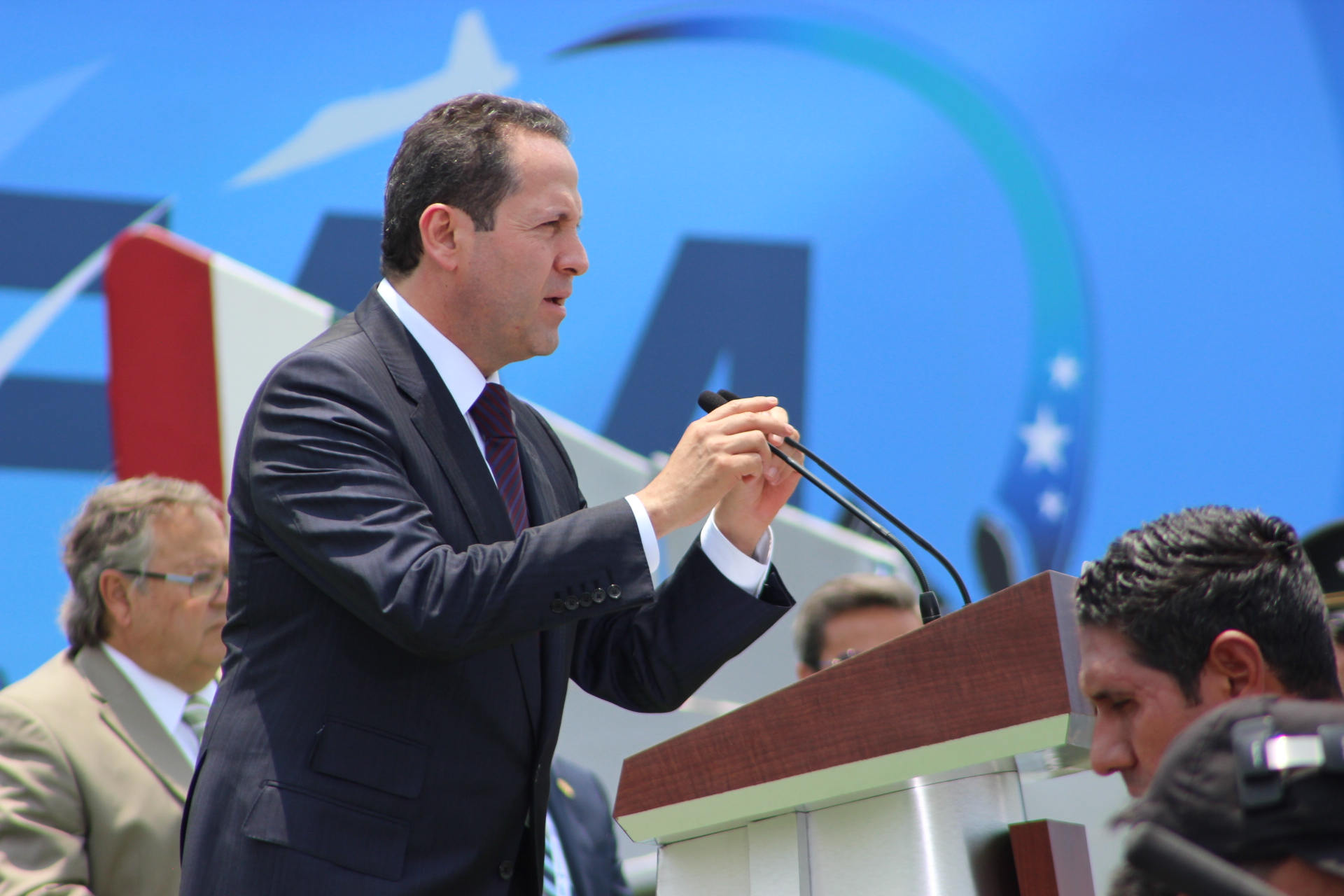
Eruviel Ávila Villegas in 2015

The program "Titulacion Simplificada" was implemented in 2015 to aid students in earning high school or university certification at a low cost. This has allowed more than 66,000 students to obtain their certification.

=== Tourism ===
In 2011 was signed the agreement with federal authorities for the improvement and development of Teotihuacán Tourism Corridors and East Zone. In September 2012 in coordination with the federation, held the Amendment Agreement Reallocation of Resources, which had the perform work to perfect the urban image, train and certify personnel to ensure quality service in the Magic Towns and the State of Mexico. An example of the work done was the changes in the distribution network of overhead power lines to underground in Metepec, these works allowed removing power poles and thereby improve the image of the Magic Town. About tourism security, in 2013 the Tourist Police was established in Tepotzotlán, this corporation has bilingual element as their preparation is focused on providing the foreign and domestic tourists needed care. To promote the crafts of the entity, in May 2013 he made an agreement with the Vatican State to commercialize the works of Mexican artisans in the showcases of museums in the city, that became the State of Mexico in the first entity in exporting to the Vatican.

In gastronomic tourism, Eruviel Ávila run the Dinner in The Sky Experience in Teotihuacán. This food experience is about enjoying food cooked with typical ingredients and prepared by renowned chefs in a 147.5 ft platform.

Cultural festivals have been a resource to stimulate the tourism in Estado de México. A good example is the Cultural Festival of Malinalco; this festival started in April 2014 to promote culture and tourism in the local town. In the other hand, the government have created public spaces that promote ecotourism, like the ecotouristic park Corral de Piedra in Amanalco.

In July 2014, Eruviel Ávila and Secretaría de Turismo Federal presented a touristic space for the monarch butterfly. In October 2015, the UNESCO gave Teotihuacán a special protection against any situation to preserve the archeological zone.

By the end of 2015, Eruviel Ávila gave five towns the nomination of Pueblo mágico. Estado de México is the state with more towns in this category and have implemented diverse programs to stimulate tourism.

== CONAGO ==
During his position as president of the CONAGO (Conferencia Nacional de Gobernadores), Eruviel Ávila treated different subjects related to transparency, formality on jobs, an only police power, between others.

Speaking of transparency, some agreements were promoted with the Public Function Secretary, SFP (Secretaria de la Función Publica) and the Nacional System of Transparency (SNT) to consolidate responsible and transparent governments, thanks to the right of free access to information and the fight to corruption inside the public politics.

By October 2015, the federal government and the CONAGO made an agreement called CIEN (Certificación de Infraestructura en Educación) with the purpose of attend and improve the infrastructure of the school buildings.

In the labor trade, the CONAGO pushed some politics for the inclusion of people with disabilities to the labor market. By November 2015, in association with the CONASETRA (Conferencia Nacional de Secretarios del Trabajo) a trade of labor politics was made, where the priority to include the young people in the labor market was exposed, increasing the job opportunities and the diffusion of those, reducing the difficulties to find a first job and creating innovating micro business programs.

In December 2015, a trade in collaboration with the CONAGO and SCHP, the use for an electronic signature called FIEL was stablished, this mechanism was created to speed up and make clear all the fiscal procedures.

In equality and genre discrimination, the CONAGO made a deal with the secretary of external relationships, Claudia Ruiz Massieu, who claimed the different international agreements that Mexico has with the Convencion sobre la Eliminiación de todas las Formas de discriminación contra la Mujer, a convention for women discriminated.

Trying to create secure corporations for citizens, Eruviel Ávila stablished the process of ratify profiles and attitudes before designate a function to people in charge from the institutions of social security. In January 2016, an initiative about the implementation of a Unic State Police was presented to the Congress searching for a better police in the state.

In economy of the state, some proposals and agreements were exposed to promote the exports, bring external investment and help Mexican companies at the exterior; an example for this was the creation of an agreement between the CONAGO and ProMexico.

Political offices
Preceded by Agustín Hernández Pastrana	Mayor of Ecatepec de Morelos; 2003–2006	Succeeded by José Luis Gutiérrez Cureño
Preceded by José Luis Gutiérrez Cureño	Mayor of Ecatepec de Morelos; 2009–2011	Succeeded by Indalecio Ríos Velázquez
Preceded by Enrique Peña Nieto	Governor of the State of Mexico; 2011 – 2017	Succeeded by Alfredo del Mazo Maza
