= San Francisco Xonacatlán =

Town in the State of Mexico

Coordinates: 19.402222°N 99.5325°W

San Francisco Xonacatlán is a town in the State of Mexico. Colonia San Francisco Xonacatlán de Vicencio is located in the municipality of Xonacatlán.

Its area code is 719; its postal code is 52060.

Its land title was established in the Codex of San Francisco Xonacatlán, which describes the pre-Columbian and colonial history of the town, and details of its land boundaries. Viceroy Antonio de Mendoza granted lands to the town in 1528. The codex is "one of the most complete of the Techialoyan corpus of manuscripts and paintings in terms of content".

== See also ==
- Xonacatlán
