= Statue of Felipe Calderón =

Partially destroyed statue in Mexico City

- Estatua de Felipe Calderón (Spanish)
- The statue in 2023
- Centro Cultural Los Pinos
- Artist: Ricardo Ponzanelli
- Year: 2012
- Medium: Bronze
- Subject: Felipe Calderón
- Dimensions: 2 m (6.6 ft)
- Condition: Damaged
- Location: Mexico City; 19°24′58″N 99°11′25″W

A partially destroyed statue of Felipe Calderón, who was the president of Mexico from 2006 to 2012, is located inside the Complejo Cultural Los Pinos in Mexico City. The complex is operated by the Secretariat of Culture, the government's agency in charge of the nation's museums and monuments.

Calderón, a right-wing politician, defeated Andrés Manuel López Obrador, a left-wing politician, in the 2006 general election. Since, López Obrador and supporters have accused that the election was marred with fraud. In 2009, Calderón dissolved the electric utility Luz y Fuerza del Centro (LyFC), and its operations were merged into the Comisión Federal de Electricidad (CFE). The bronze sculpture was commisioned and installed in 2012. López Obrador became president in 2018 and installed his political platform, the Fourth Transformation.

In July 2025, a tree branch knocked over the statue, causing minor damage. Although the complex announced its restoration and reinstallment, they were never carried out. In 2026, while Calderón was giving a speech in the city, former LyFC workers entered Los Pinos and vandalized the statue, decapitating it along with its plaque.

== Background ==
The Complejo Cultural Los Pinos is operated by the Secretariat of Culture. is the former official residence and office of the president of Mexico, operating from 1934 to 2018. The site features sculptures of the presidents who lived there, from Lázaro Cárdenas to Enrique Peña Nieto, except for Ernesto Zedillo.

Felipe Calderón served as president from 2006 to 2012. His bronze sculpture was commissioned to Ricardo Ponzanelli in 2012, the final year of Calderón's term, to be unveiled on 1 December, at a cost of MX$500,000 (the equivalent of some US$38,000 at the time). It was approximately 2 meters (6 ft 7 in) tall.

Calderón, a right-wing figure, is controversial among politicians associated with the Fourth Transformation, a left-wing political platform whose administration was in power when the sculpture was toppled and damaged. They have accused Calderón of electoral fraud in 2006 after he defeated Andrés Manuel López Obrador. Calderón also dismantled Luz y Fuerza del Centro (LyFC) in 2009 by merging its operations with those of the Comisión Federal de Electricidad (CFE).

In 2024, President López Obrador denied that he would remove the statue, saying that "history would judge him".

== Damage ==
In July 2025, the director of the site reported that the statue of Calderón was knocked over by a tree branch amid a storm, sustaining damage to its right leg and pedestal, and it was announced that it would be restored and reinstalled. However, government authorities did not return it to its pedestal because the site was "undergoing a process of reviewing, maintaining, and replacing the trees" as of March 2026. After a year on the ground, the statue was still unrestored and covered in dirt, mud, branches, and bird droppings.

In early September 2026, politician Roberto Gil Zuarth of the National Action Party filed a writ of amparo to allow the sculpture to be reinstalled using private funds, given the lack of clarity as to why the government was not doing so. However, on 30 September 2026, while Calderón was giving a speech in the city, former employees of LyFC, who had previously arrived at the event venue but were not allowed to enter, traveled to Los Pinos and accessed the complex to vandalize the statue, decapitating it along with its plaque. Security personnel did not intervene during the protest.

President Claudia Sheinbaum criticized the protesters' actions and Calderón's return to the public eye. Ricardo Monreal, Morena's coordinator in the Chamber of Deputies, called the event a popular demonstration. The Mexican Electricians' Union, of which members of LyFC are part, distanced itself from the incident. Gil Zuarth filed a complaint with the Attorney General of Mexico's office against whoever is responsible for the damage. Calderón opined that:

The statue says very little about me, but says a lot about who they are: miserable people ... What happened at Los Pinos shows precisely that there is no government that guarantees either the protection of property or the safety of people.

== See also ==
- Statue of Andrés Manuel López Obrador
