= Alfredo del Mazo Maza =

Governor of the State of Mexico from 2017 to 2023

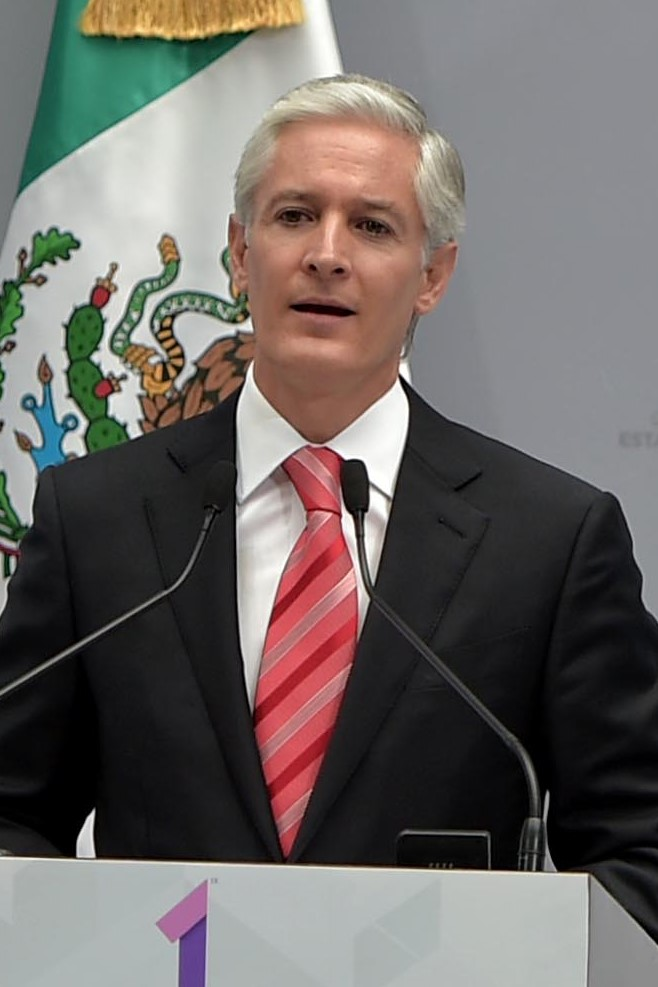

Governor of the State of Mexico
- In office 16 September 2017 – 15 September 2023
- Preceded by: Eruviel Ávila Villegas
- Succeeded by: Delfina Gómez Álvarez

Member of the Congress of the Union for the State of Mexico's 18th district
- In office 1 September 2015 – 30 January 2017
- Preceded by: Fernando Alfredo Maldonado
- Succeeded by: Miguel Ángel Ramírez Ponce

Director General of the National Works and Public Services Bank
- In office 1 January 2010 – 26 January 2017
- President: Enrique Peña Nieto
- Preceded by: Fernando Alfredo Maldonado
- Succeeded by: Miguel Ángel Ramírez Ponce

Mayor of Huixquilucan
- In office 1 January 2010 – 6 December 2012
- Preceded by: Félix Adrián Fuentes Villalobos
- Succeeded by: Carlos Iriarte Mercado

Personal details
- Born: 5 December 1975 (age 50) Toluca, State of Mexico, Mexico
- Party: Institutional Revolutionary Party (until 2024)
- Spouse: Fernanda Castillo Cuevas (m. 2014)
- Children: 4
- Education: Autonomous Technological Institute of Mexico (BBA); Harvard University
- Occupation: Accountant

Alfredo del Mazo Maza (born 5 December 1975) is a Mexican politician formerly affiliated with the Institutional Revolutionary Party (PRI) who served as Governor of the State of Mexico from 2017 to 2023. Members of del Mazo's family have collectively governed the State of Mexico for 23 years, starting with his grandfather Alfredo del Mazo Vélez (1945–1951) and followed by his father Alfredo del Mazo González (1981–1986) and his cousin Enrique Peña Nieto (2005–2011); adding Arturo Montiel, Peña Nieto's uncle, the del Mazo family's rule extends to 29 years.

== Early life ==
Del Mazo was born on 5 December 1975 to Alfredo del Mazo González, governor of the State of Mexico between 1981 and 1986; his grandfather, Alfredo del Mazo Vélez, was in turn governor between 1945 and 1951. He is also a cousin of former president and former governor Enrique Peña Nieto. He attended the Instituto Tecnológico Autónomo de México and graduated with a degree in business administration, then went on to graduate studies at Harvard University. In his early career, he held several public and private sector positions of a financial nature. He was a Developer of Financial Projects for Grupo Financiero Serfín between 1996 and 1997 and Banco Azteca from 2003 to 2005. He also briefly worked at Pemex between 2000 and 2001.

== Political career ==
Del Mazo's first post in the State of Mexico government was as the director general of small business programs in the Secretariat of Economic Development, from 2005 to 2006; he left that post to serve as the director general of the State of Mexico Entrepreneurship Institute, where he remained for two years before being tapped to serve as the state secretary of tourism. He also became a national political councilor and member of the PRI's Permanent Political Commission.

In 2009, del Mazo successfully ran for the municipal presidency of Huixquilucan and served a three-year term. When that term ended, newly installed President Peña Nieto placed him in the position of director of Banobras, the National Bank of Public Works and Services. During most of this time, he also presided a committee heading outreach to Congress by the Mexican Federation of Municipalities.

In 2015, voters in the 18th district of the State of Mexico, also including Huixquilucan, sent del Mazo to the Chamber of Deputies for the LXIII Legislature. He presided over two commissions but not at the same time, leaving the Infrastructure Commission in March 2016 to become the president of the Budget and Public Account Commission, a post he would hold until leaving the Chamber definitively on January 30, 2017, in order to pursue a candidacy for governor. He was replaced in San Lázaro before the end of his three-year term by his alternate, Miguel Ángel Ramírez Ponce.

=== 2017 gubernatorial campaign ===
Six years after initially pursuing the PRI gubernatorial nomination secured by Eruviel Ávila in 2011, del Mazo was tapped as the PRI's gubernatorial candidate in 2017, vying for an office the party had never lost. During the campaign, del Mazo was criticized for promoting himself using images from the Japanese animated film My Neighbor Totoro without permission. The election quickly turned into a two-horse race with del Mazo being challenged by Morena candidate Delfina Gómez Álvarez. On election day, the official count gave del Mazo the victory with 33.69 percent of the vote compared to 30.91 percent for Gómez Álvarez.

==== Accusations of electoral fraud ====
Despite the official vote results given by the National Electoral Institute, the election was marred by irregularities including reports of vote-buying, spending beyond legal campaign finance limits, and electoral counts that gave del Mazo extra votes that awarded the election to him.

In November 2017, Proceso magazine published an article accusing the PRI of breaking at least 16 state laws during the elections, which were denounced 619 times. They said that all of them were broken in order to favor del Mazo during the election.

=== Governor of the State of Mexico ===
Alfredo del Mazo was sworn in as governor on September 15, 2017. One of his campaign promises was to decrease crime within his first 100 days as governor. However, the opposite happened instead: 28,508 violent crimes were reported within Alfredo del Mazo's first month as governor, the highest violent crime figure in the history of the State of Mexico.

In September 2020, del Mazo proposed a major overhaul of the state administration, creating a Department of Women and the fusion of other departments. Just a few days earlier, a group of feminists burned the offices of the Human Rights Commission (Codhem) in Ecatepec in protest against governmental inaction related to femicides, child molestation, and other concerns.

The Congress of the State of Mexico approved MXN $8,637,000,000 in debt for fiscal year 2021 on January 22, 2021. The total budget is MXN $303,120,223,774 (US$15,18 billion). The debt will be destined to pay for increased expenses for health care and to reactivate the economy in light of the COVID-19 pandemic in Mexico. MXN $4 billion is destined for health care (including building new hospitals), public transportation, water and sewage infrastructure, and electric power supply.

== Personal life ==
Del Mazo is married to Fernanda del Castillo; the couple have four children, including two from a previous relationship. On 30 March 2017, del Castillo gave birth to a child, Alfredo del Mazo IV.

== See also ==
- Atlacomulco Group

Political offices
Preceded by Félix Adrián Fuentes Villalobos	Mayor of Huixquilucan de Degollado; 2010–2012	Succeeded by Carlos Iriarte Mercado
Preceded by Eruviel Ávila Villegas	Governor of the State of Mexico; 2017 – 2023	Succeeded by Delfina Gómez Álvarez
