= Sierra de las Cruces =

Mountain range in south-central Mexico

Coordinates: 27°58′N 103°42′W

Region map

The Sierra de las Cruces, also popularly called Sierra del Monte de las Cruces, is a mountain range in Mexico, in its south central region, which delimits the valleys of Mexico and Cuautitlán in the Basin of Mexico, with Toluca Valley as well as a part of the Lerma Basin. The Battle of Monte de las Cruces took place in this mountain range, as well as the construction of the Cutzamala System.

It is part of the Transversal Volcanic Axis, and represents the watershed of three hydrological basins: the Lerma River, the Valley of Mexico (both of the endorheic type) and the Balsas River (of the exorheic type).

== History ==
Due to the studies carried out in the mountains, it is considered that Sierra de las Cruces was formed next to the Trans-Mexican Volcanic Belt, which is considered a continental volcanic arc, formed since the recent Miocene epoch, with the La Catedral stratovolcano being the oldest with about 3.71 ± 0.40 million years. years., with an important activity during the Pliocene and Pleistocene formed by extensive lava flows and domes of andesitic-dacitic composition and calc-alkaline affinity, alternating with pyroclastic flows of blocks and ashes, pumice flows, pyroclastic surges, fall deposits, flows of debris and mud, as well as collapses resulting in debris avalanche deposits.

Its entire structure rests in the southern area on Cretaceous limestone or on volcanic rocks from the basal mafic sequence of 7.1 million years, which makes it younger than the Miocene Tepoztlán formation; the northern part rests on a series of volcanic structures from the middle Miocene that correspond to the formation of the Sierra de Guadalupe, between 14 and 16 million years old, and the Sierra de la Muerta from the late Pliocene.
