= Tlazala de Fabela =

Coordinates: 19°52′N 99°44′W

- Town
- Interactive map of Tlazala de Fabela
- Country: Mexico
- State: Mexico (state)

Area
  - Total: 179.82 km^{2} (69.43 sq mi)

Population (2005)
  - Total: 2,002
- Time zone: UTC-6 (Central Standard Time)

Tlazala de Fabela is a town and municipal seat of the municipality of the Isidro Fabela Municipality in the State of Mexico in Mexico. The municipality covers an area of 179.82 km^{2}.

As of 2005, the municipality had a total population of 2,002.
