= Fernando Maldonado Hernández =

Mexican politician and lawyer

Fernando Alfredo Maldonado
- Born: 8 January 1966 (age 60); State of Mexico, Mexico
- Occupation: Politician
- Political party: PRI

Fernando Alfredo Maldonado Hernández (born 8 January 1966) is a Mexican politician and lawyer affiliated with the Institutional Revolutionary Party (PRI). In the 2012 general election he was elected to the Chamber of Deputies to represent the State of Mexico's 18th district during the 62nd session of Congress.
