= Isidro Fabela =

Mexican politician

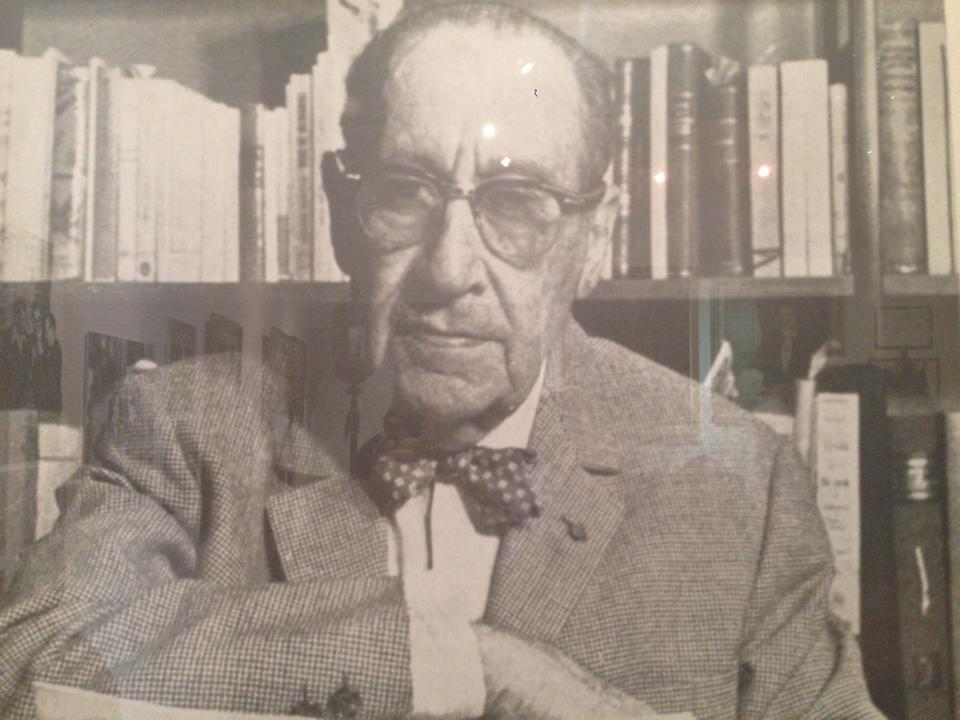
Isidro Fabela.

José Isidro Fabela Alfaro (28 June 1882 – 12 August 1964) was a Mexican judge, politician, professor, writer, publisher, governor of the State of Mexico, diplomat, and delegate to the now defunct League of Nations. Fabela was born in Atlacomulco, Mexico State. He was a member of the group of intellectuals opposed to the Porfirio Díaz regime, the Ateneo de Juventud, a group that also included José Vasconcelos and Diego Rivera. He served prominently revolutionary leader Venustiano Carranza and went on to hold many important posts in the Mexican government.

== Life ==
=== Teaching/studies ===
Isidro Fabela received his law degree from the National School of Law at the National Autonomous University of Mexico (Spanish: Universidad Nacional Autónoma de México) (UNAM) in 1908. Fabela returned to teach at UNAM in 1921, at his alma mater the National Law School, teaching International Public Law. Prior to teaching at UNAM, Fabela was a professor of history at the National Institute in Chihuahua between 1911 and 1913, and a professor at the Literary Institute of Mexico from 1912 to 1913.

=== During the era of the Mexican Revolution ===
Isidro Fabela worked in various roles of local government, his earliest role is most closely connected to his work as a lawyer, serving as Chief Public Defender for the Federal District (Mexico State) in 1911. In the same year he was elected Official Mayor and secretary general of Chihuahua where he served until 1913. In 1913 he was elected as Official Mayor and secretary general of Government of the State of Sonora. From 1912 to 1914 Fabela served as federal deputy from State of Mexico, he served again in this position from 1922 to 1923. In 1942 Fabela was elected as Governor of the State of Mexico and served in that capacity until 1945. In 1946 Fabela was elected to the role of Senator from Mexico State. Fabela resigned the position after grooming Adolfo López Mateos to assume the role, and after being appointed to the position of Judge to the International Court of Justice.

In 1913, Isidro briefly fled Mexico to Cuba after calling upon the Ministers of the Government to cease their action, in particular the "arbitrary detention" of the editor of El Voto newspaper. From Cuba The New York Times reported Fabela as stating: "The attitude of the United States in not recognizing Provision President Huerta's Government will cause the early fall of the present Administration in Mexico."

=== International roles ===
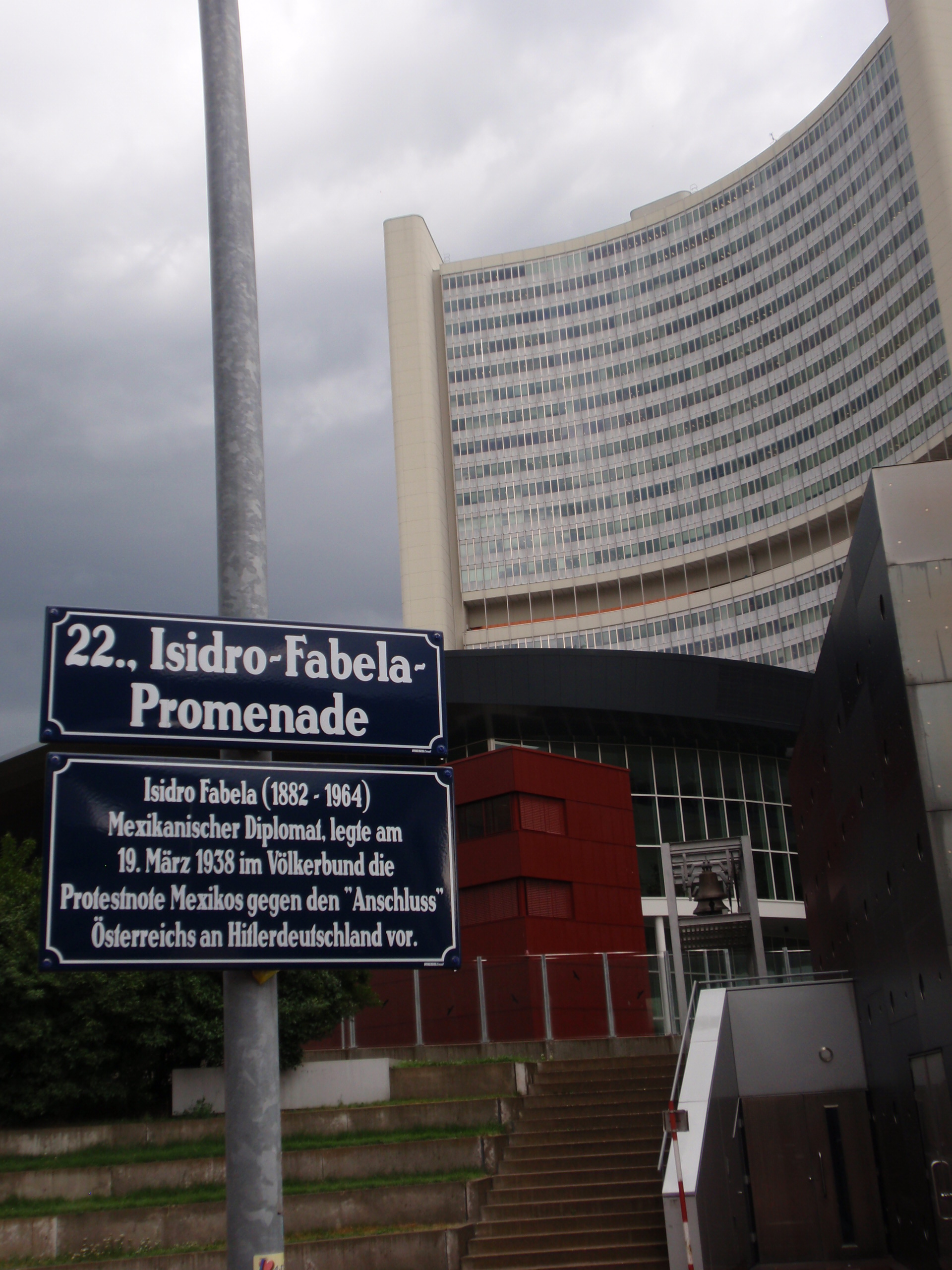
Promenade in Vienna-Donaustadt named in honor of Isidro Fabela: "Mexican diplomat, who presented on March 19, 1938 to the League of Nations a protest note from Mexico against the "annexation" of Austria to Hitler's Germany."

Isidro Fabela held numerous international positions, the first of such being Secretary of Foreign Relations for the government of Venustiano Carranza from 1913 to 1915. In this capacity he is often cited as acting as a censor for Carranza, filtering who can see him, and under what conditions, as well as what questions the press could ask of Carranza. Fabela was noted as defending the death of William S. Benton, a foreign citizen and land owner who was executed by Rodolfo Fierro under orders of then General Pancho Villa: "Benton tried to assassinate Gen. Francisco Villa at Ciudad Juárez, but, owing to the energy with which Gen. Villa acted, he was able to disarm him himself" Defending Villa's action and the governments lack of response. In addition to Secretary of Foreign Relations, Fabela was the Special Diplomat to Italy and Spain in 1915. The following year he was selected as Minister to Argentina, Brazil, Chile, and Uruguay. From 1918 to 1920 Fabela served as Special Ambassador to Argentina.

In 1937 Fabela was chosen as the Mexican Delegate to the International Office of Labor at the League of Nations where he served until 1940. In 1938 as Minister and voice of the Mexican Delegation, he denounced the annexation of Austria by Nazi Germany.

From 1937 to 1940 Isidro Fabela was head of the Mexican Delegation to the League of Nations in Geneva. In this capacity, he presented on behalf of the Mexican Foreign Minister Eduardo Hay on March 19, 1938, formulated by him, an official note of protest against the occupation of Austria by the troops of the German Wehrmacht. Mexico was the only country in the world to officially protest against the "connection" designated annexation of Austria before the League of Nations.

To commemorate this act, after the war, in the Viennese district of Donaustadt, a promenade in the UNO-City complex, where the Vienna headquarters of the United Nations is located, was named after him. Fabela is next to Gilberto Bosques, the savior of numerous Austrian persecuted during the Nazi era, the second Mexican diplomat, to bestow this honor.

While in Geneva, Fabela also challenged the ways by which the League principle of non-intervention was being applied in the Spanish Civil War, arguing that a clear distinction should be made between the perpetrators and victims of aggression, and that the Spanish Republic deserved international support.

After the Second World War, in Mexico while serving as the senator from Mexico State (Estado de México), Fabela was appointed to the position of Judge for the International Court of Justice in 1946; he served in this capacity until 1952.

=== Writer ===
Isidro Fabela is noted with founding two periodicals, and publishing a variety of books. In 1910, Fabela founded the newspaper La Verdad and in 1914, the newspaper El Pueblo. He has also published the following books:

- La tristeza del amor (The sadness of love)
- Los prescursores de la diplomacia mexicana (The precursors of the Mexican diplomacy)
- Historia diplomática de la Revolución Mexicana (Diplomatic History of the Mexican Revolution)
- Documentos históricos de la Revolución Mexicana (Historical Documents of the Mexican Revolution)
- Mis memorias de la Revolución (My Memories of the Revolution)
- Arengas Revolucionarias, Discursos y Articulos Politicos (Revolutionary Speaks Political Speeches & Articles)

== Legacy ==
=== Adolfo López Mateos ===
Isidro is often mentioned as the "political father" to Adolfo López Mateos. First appointing Mateos to the position of director of the Literary Scientific Institute of the State of Mexico. When Fabela was elected to the Senate of Mexico, he appointed Mateos to the position of "Alternate Federal Senator", giving Mateos the ability to vote when he was absent. Following Fabelas departure to the position of Judge at the International Court of Justice, Mateos was appointed to vacant position as senator. It was on this very day that Mateos mother died, he received shortly after accepting the position.

=== Cultural Center ===
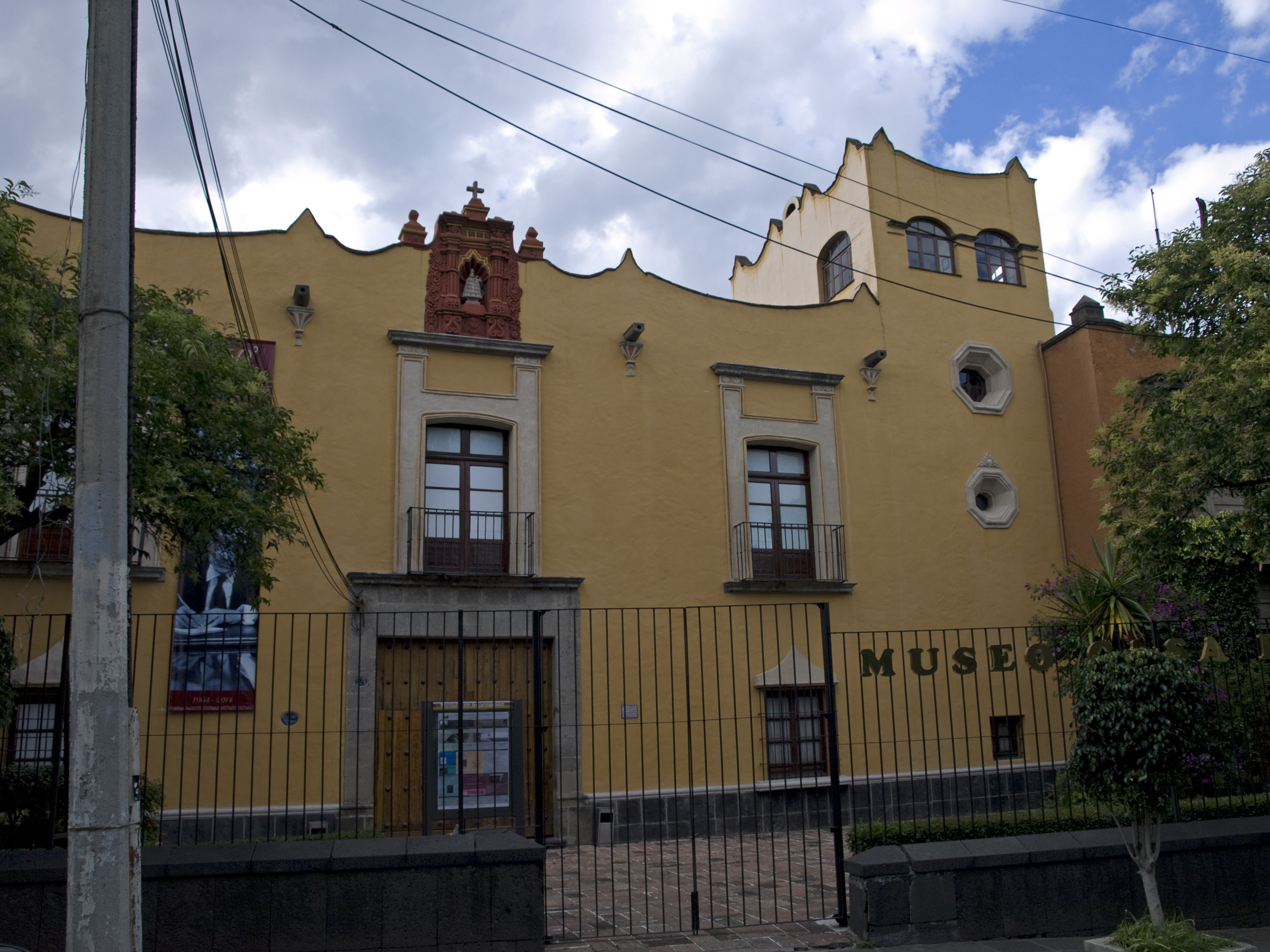
Isidro Fabela Cultural Center - Casa del Risco Museum

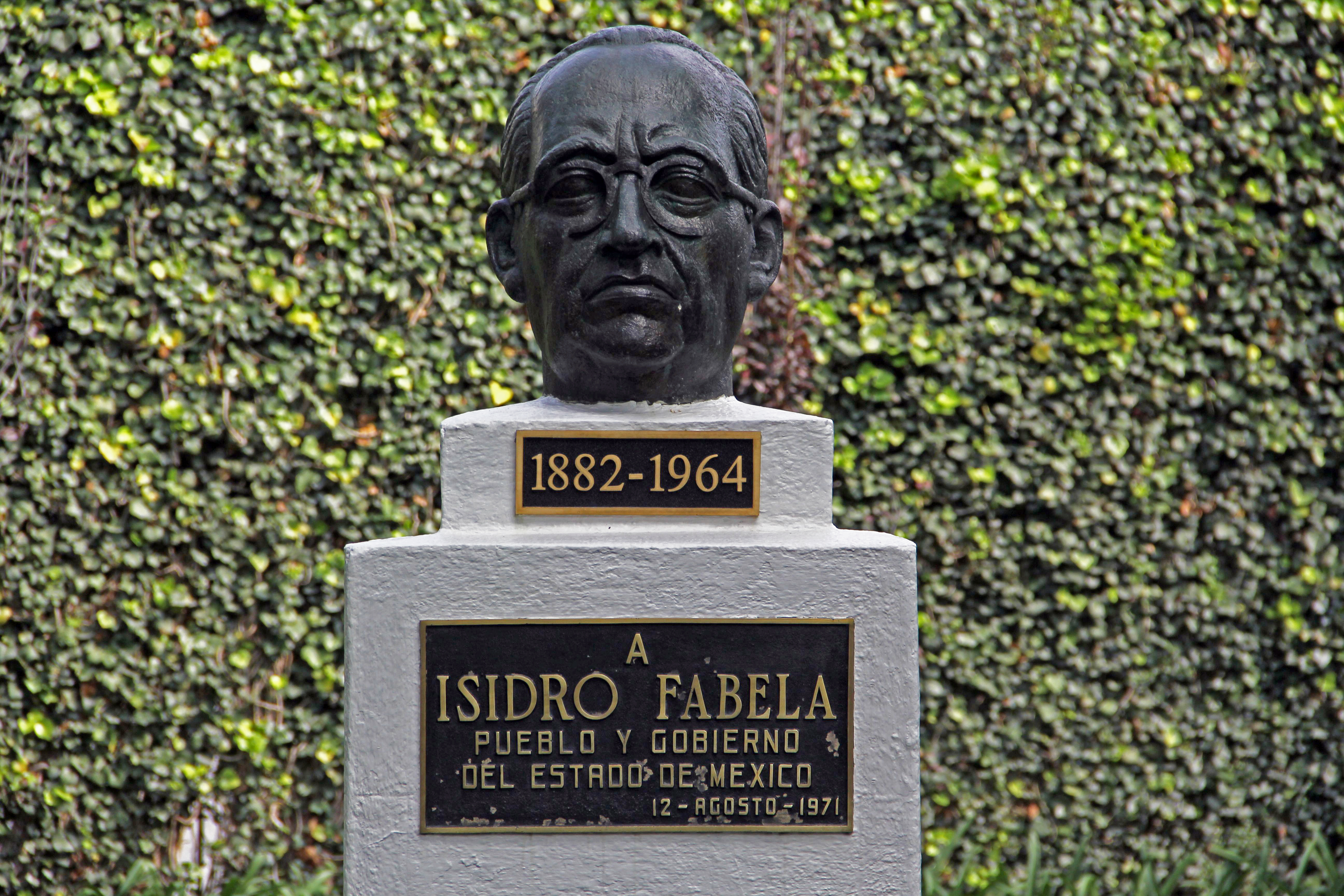
Bust located inside the "Casa de Cultura" in San Angel.

The home of Isidro Fabela was turned into the Isidro Fabela Cultural Center in 1958. Fabela donated the house in San Ángel, to the Mexican Government. It is alternately called "Casa del Risco". The cultural center is considered a historical monument and houses a large art collection formerly belonging to Isidro Fabela. The collection is a combination of sculptures, furniture and applied arts. The premises include a large library, an archive, and an auditorium. In 1958 The Isidro Fabela Trust formed in a partnership with the Bank of Mexico, and in 1988 joined with the state government of Mexico.

=== Awards ===
==== Belisario Domínguez Medal of Honor ====
Isidro Fabela was also a recipient of the Belisario Domínguez Medal of Honor in 1960. The Belisario Domínguez Medal of Honor is the highest award bestowed by the Mexican congress. The award has been given every year since 1954 by the Senate of Mexico to eminent Mexicans with a distinguished lifetime career who contributed most "toward the welfare of the Nation and mankind".

==== Medalla Isidro Fabela ====
The Technical Board of the Faculty of Law (FD) for the National Autonomous University of Mexico (UNAM) awards a medal named for Isidro Fabela. The Medalla Isidro Fabela is awarded for "steadfastness for the values that sustain the culture and democracy in our region." Recipients include: José Luis Rodríguez Zapatero (2007), José Saramago (2004), Ernesto Cardenal (2006), Juan Gelman (2006), Baltasar Garzón Real (2005).

| Preceded by Heriberto Jara Corona | Belisario Domínguez Medal of Honor; 1960 | Succeeded by José Inocente Lugo |
