= Xonacatlán =

- Municipality
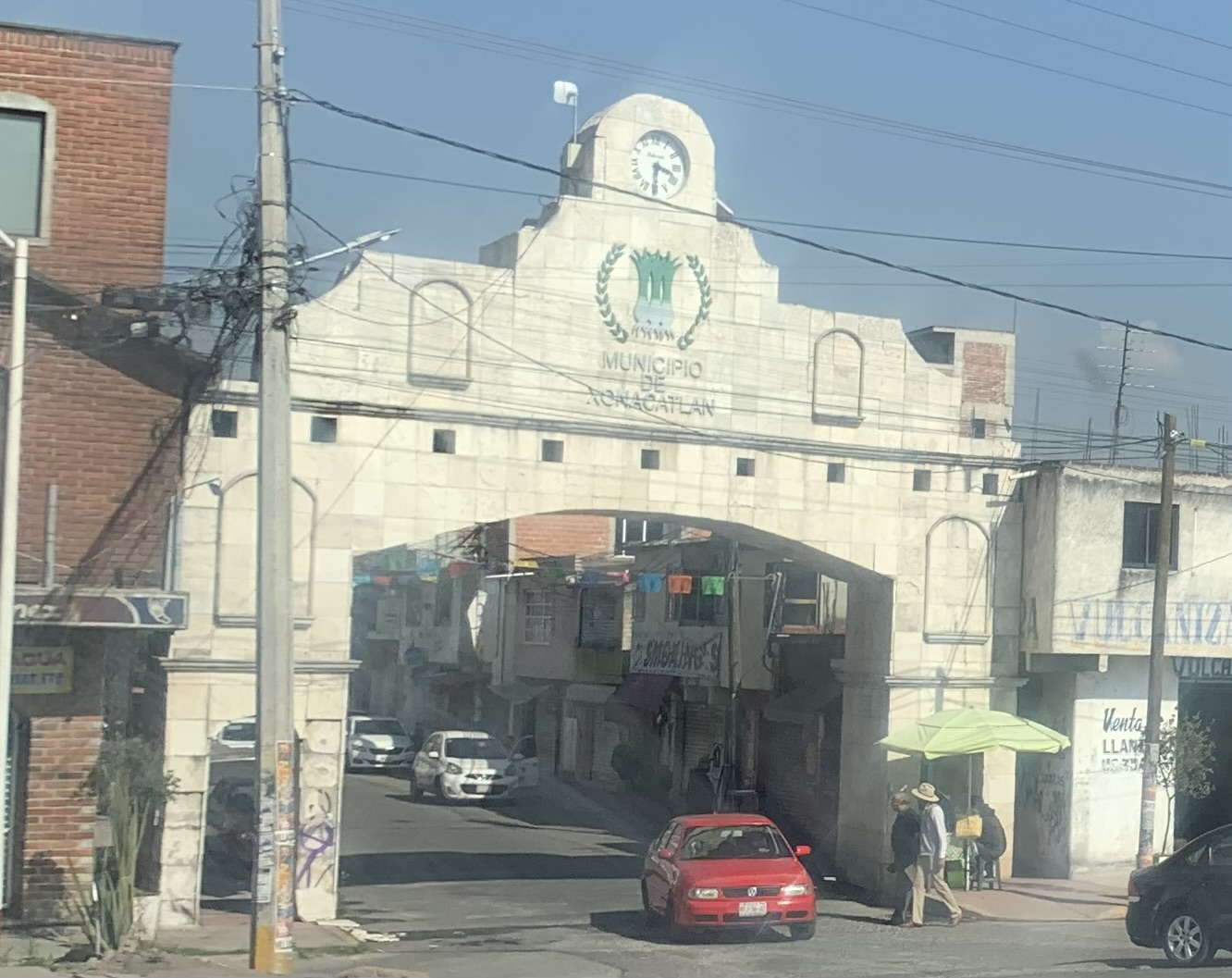
- Street in Xonacatlán

- Coat of arms

- Location in Mexico
- Coordinates: 19°24′N 99°32′W
- Country: Mexico
- State: Mexico (state)
- Municipal Seat: Xonacatlán
- Xonacatlán: Before 1476

Government
  - Municipal President: Carlos González González

Area
  - Total: 32.87 km^{2} (12.69 sq mi)

Population (2005)
  - Total: 45,274
- Time zone: UTC-6 (Central Standard Time)
- Postal code: 52060
- Area code: 719
- Website: https://www.xonacatlan.gob.mx/

Xonacatlán (Spanish pronunciation: [xonakaˈtlan]) is one of 125 municipalities in Mexico State in Mexico. The municipality covers an area of 32.87 km^{2} (12.69 sq mi).

As of 2005, the municipality had a total population of 45,274. Xonacatlán de Vicencio is located in the municipality of Xonacatlán.

== Etymology ==
According to the Enciclopedia de los Municipios de México, published by the Mexican government, the name Xonacatlán is Nahuatl in origin and means "among the onions" ("onion" in Nahuatl is "xonacatl").

== History ==
The date of the town's foundation is not historically recorded. However, it was conquered in 1476 by Axayácatl during the conquest of the valley of Toluca. The town fell to the invading Spanish forces in 1521. The independence of Mexico in 1821 contributed to the town's prosperity. The town was originally assigned to part of another municipality, but Celso Vicencio Hernández advocated for its municipal status in the State of Mexico's legislature, ultimately successfully, and municipal status was conferred on October 18, 1870. Afterward, political power was held by a few dominated by the Vicencio family. Upon Celso Vicencio's death on February 19, 1908, the city government proclaimed the renaming of the town to Xonacatlán de Vicencio. The city hall was built from 1931 to 1945.
