= Atlacomulco de Fabela =

Atlacomulco de Fabela Mbado (in Otomi)
- Municipal Seat
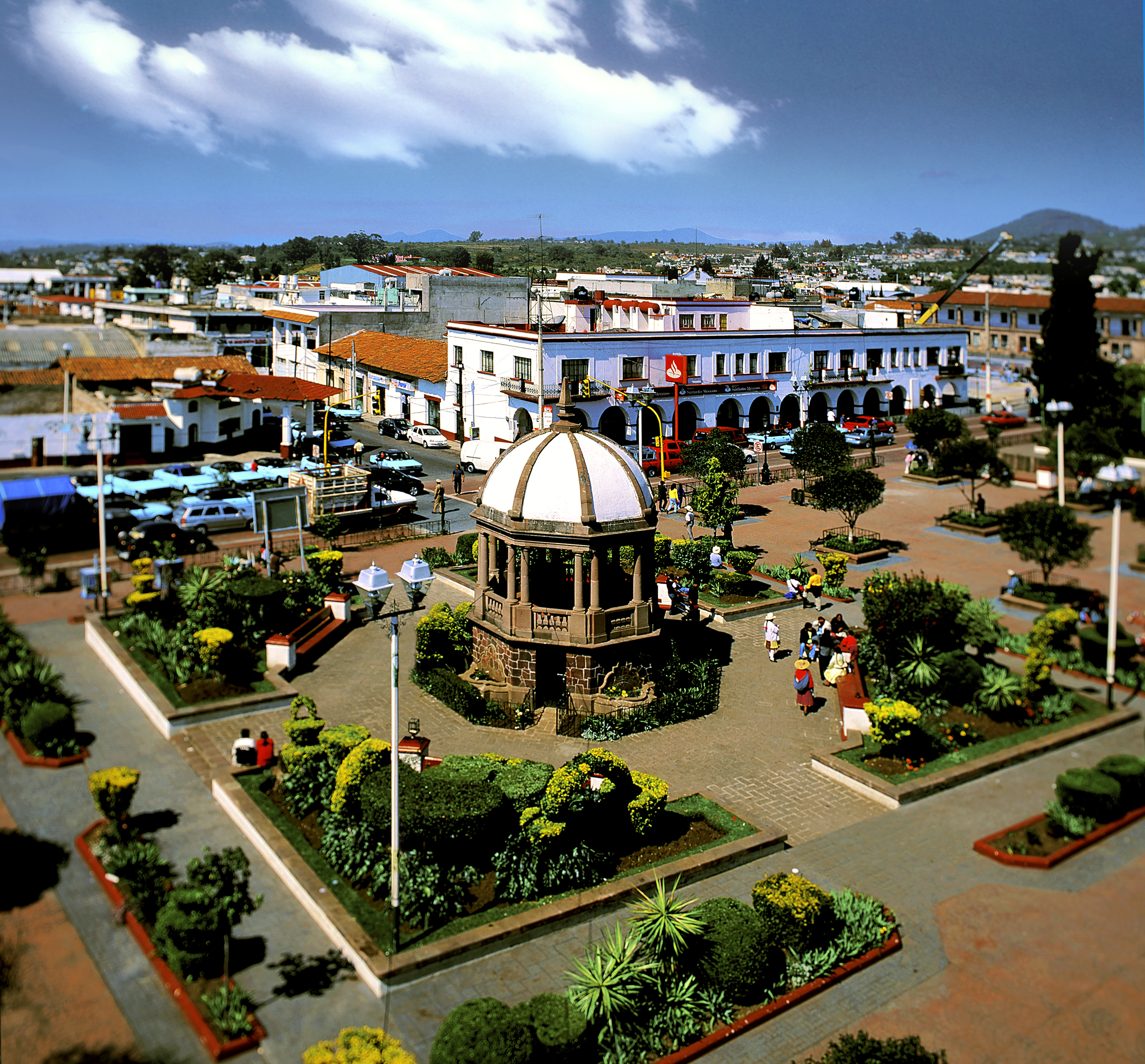
- =

- Location within Mexico
- Coordinates: 20°5′54″N 99°49′37″W
- Country: Mexico
- State: Mexico
- Municipality: Atlacomulco
- Elevation: 2,596 m (8,517 ft)

Population (2010)
  - Total: 22,774
- Time zone: UTC-6 (Central Standard Time)
- Postal code (of seat): 50360
- INEGI code: 1500140001

Atlacomulco de Fabela (Atlacomolco in Nahuatl, Mbado in Otomi and Mbaro in Mazahua) is a town and municipal seat of the Atlacomulco Municipality, State of Mexico in Mexico.
