= Alfredo del Mazo Vélez =

Mexican politician

Secretary of Hydraulic Resources
- In office 1 December 1958 – 1 December 1964
- President: Adolfo López Mateos
- Preceded by: Luis Echeagaray Bablot
- Succeeded by: José Hernández Terán

Governor of the State of Mexico
- In office 16 September 1945 – 15 September 1951
- Preceded by: Isidro Fabela
- Succeeded by: Salvador Sánchez Colín

Personal details
- Born: 21 August 1904 Atlacomulco, State of Mexico, Mexico
- Died: 19 December 1975 (aged 71) Mexico City, Mexico
- Party: PRI

Alfredo del Mazo Vélez (21 August 1904 – 19 December 1975) was a Mexican politician affiliated with the Institutional Revolutionary Party. He was the Governor of the State of Mexico from 1945 to 1951 and served as the Secretary of Hydraulic Resources during the six-year presidency of Adolfo López Mateos.

== Life ==
del Mazo, whose father and grandfather had both been mayors of his hometown of Atlacomulco, was born to Manuel del Mazo Villasante and Mercedes Vélez in 1904. His public service career began when he worked on the construction of the Don Martín Dam in Coahuila; he also occupied warehouse management positions in the National Road Commission and the National Irrigation Commission, of which he would be the head of the Administrative Department by 1940.

del Mazo became a close disciple of Governor Isidro Fabela, who named him state treasurer in 1942 and secretary general of the government the next year. He was tapped to succeed Fabela as governor of the State of Mexico in 1945. During his government, new industrial concessions were issued, roads, schools and irrigation projects were carried out, and a pension law was issued, forming the foundation for the modern social security system of the State of Mexico. After his term as governor, he was a senator and was the president of the Senate during October 1954. He served in the federal cabinet for the entire presidency of Adolfo López Mateos after being selected to head his presidential campaign.

One of his four sons, Alfredo del Mazo González, went on to govern the State of Mexico from 1981 to 1986.

del Mazo died in Mexico City on December 19, 1975. He was initially buried in Mexico City, but his remains were later relocated to the Rotunda of Illustrious Men of the State of Mexico in Toluca.
