= Arturo Montiel =

Mexican politician

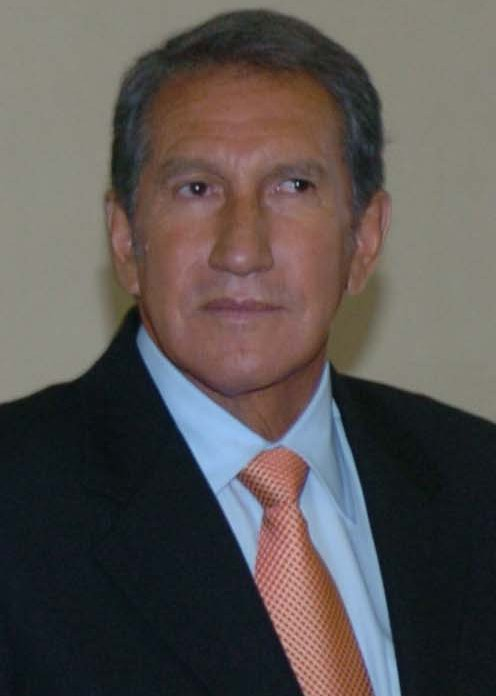

Governor of the State of Mexico
- In office 16 September 1999 – 15 September 2005
- Preceded by: César Camacho Quiroz
- Succeeded by: Enrique Peña Nieto

Member of the Chamber of Deputies for the State of Mexico's 16th district
- In office 1 November 1991 – 31 October 1994
- Preceded by: Alfredo Reyes Contreras
- Succeeded by: Agustín Mauro Jordán Arzate

Personal details
- Born: Arturo Montiel Rojas; October 15, 1943 (age 81); Atlacomulco, Mexico
- Political party: Institutional Revolutionary Party
- Spouses: Paola Yáñez (m. 1970; div. 2002) Maude Versini (m. 2002; div. 2008) Norma Veraz (m. 2009; div. 2015) Karla Cortés Treviño (m. 2016)
- Children: Arturo Montiel Yáñez, Juan Pablo Montiel Yáñez, Sofía, Adrián, Alexi
- Occupation: Politician

Arturo Montiel Rojas (born October 15, 1943) is a Mexican politician affiliated with the Institutional Revolutionary Party (PRI). He was a governor of the State of México and a federal deputy. He contested the PRI's nomination for President of Mexico in the 2006 election before dropping out.

== Early life and education ==
Montiel is the son of Gregorio Montiel Monroy and Delia Rojas García. He received bachelor's degrees in public administration and accountancy from the National Autonomous University of Mexico (UNAM) in 1970. He married Maude Versini in 2002, a French journalist 31 years younger than he was. They divorced in September 2007.

== Political career ==
As a politician, he was the mayor of Naucalpan and director of civil protection at the federal Ministry of the Interior. At the state level he was secretary of economic development and presided twice over the local branch of the Institutional Revolutionary Party (PRI).

In 1999, during his gubernatorial campaign for the State of Mexico, he portrayed himself as a tough-on-crime candidate, using a series of radio spots in which he implied that criminals did not deserve human rights protection, saying "human rights are for humans, not for rats" ("rat" being common slang for "thief"). He won the election by simple majority and served from 1999 until 2005.

On August 4, 2005, he was elected as candidate of Unidad Democrática, a political group challenging former PRI leader Roberto Madrazo for the party's candidacy for the 2006 presidential election. However, in a press conference held on October 20, he announced that he would no longer seek his party's nomination because of accusations leveled against his family in the media, including his ownership of several luxury apartments and mansions in Mexico and France.

Among other businesses he granted construction of more than 5,000 homes in an ecologically preserved community in the municipality of Atizapán de Zaragoza, the Zona Esmeralda. These new communities, shopping malls and schools were constructed on what used to be green areas and forests.

In 2013, Forbes magazine named Montiel as one of the 10 most corrupt Mexican politicians.

== Family ==
Enrique Peña Nieto, the 57th president of Mexico, is Montiel's nephew.
