= 1st federal electoral district of the State of Mexico =

Federal electoral district of Mexico

State of Mexico's 1st
- Electoral district of the Chamber of Deputies of Mexico

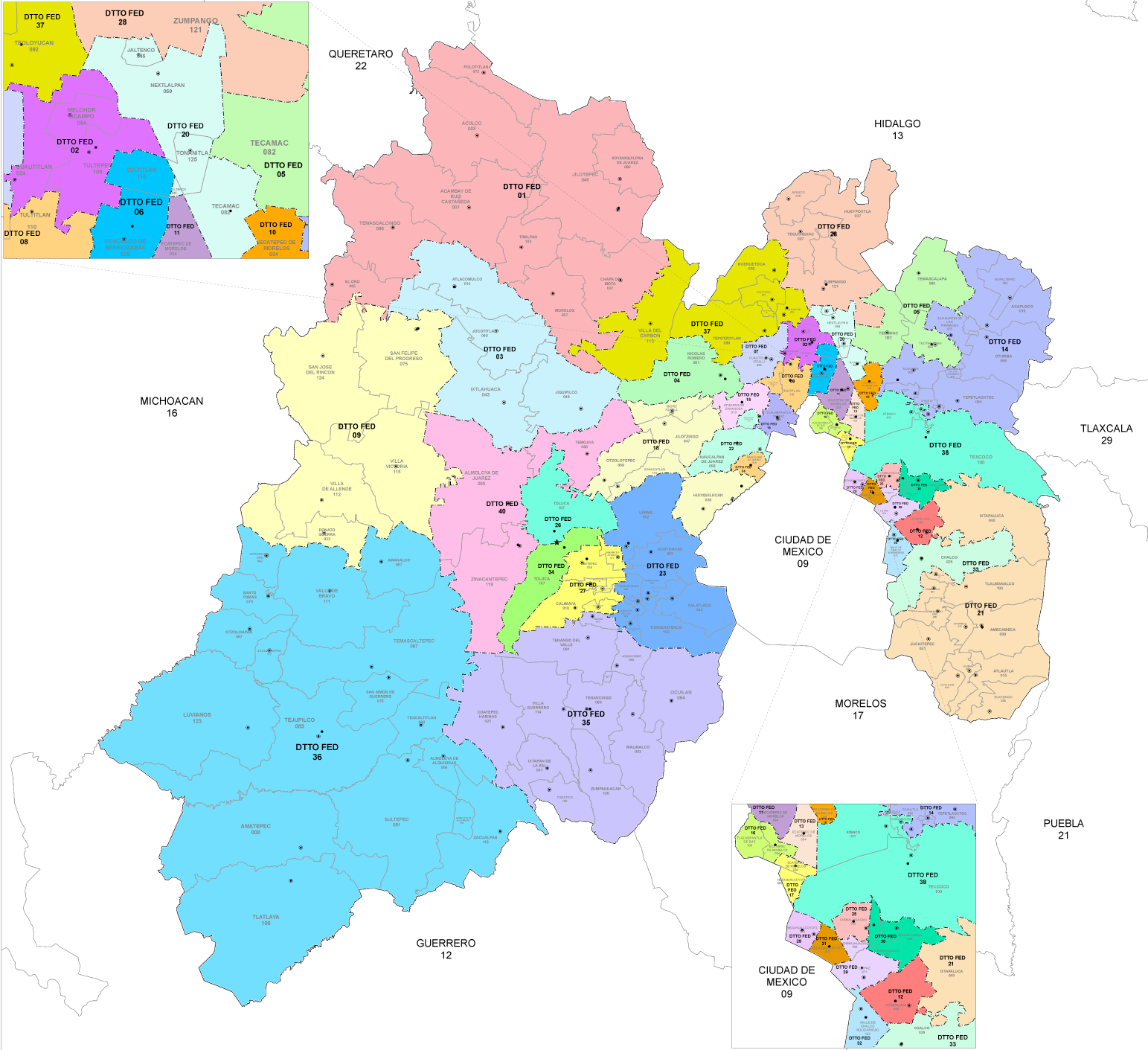
- State of Mexico's districts since 2023

Incumbent
- Member: María Luisa Mendoza
- Party: ▌Ecologist Green Party
- Congress: 66th (2024–2027)

District
- State: State of Mexico
- Head town: Jilotepec de Molina Enríquez
- Coordinates: 19°57′N 99°32′W
- Covers: 10 municipalities: Acambay, Aculco, Chapa de Mota, El Oro, Jilotepec, Morelos, Polotitlán, Soyaniquilpan de Juárez, Temascalcingo, Timilpan
- PR region: Fifth
- Precincts: 213
- Population: 418,923 (2020 census)
- Indigenous: Yes (49%)

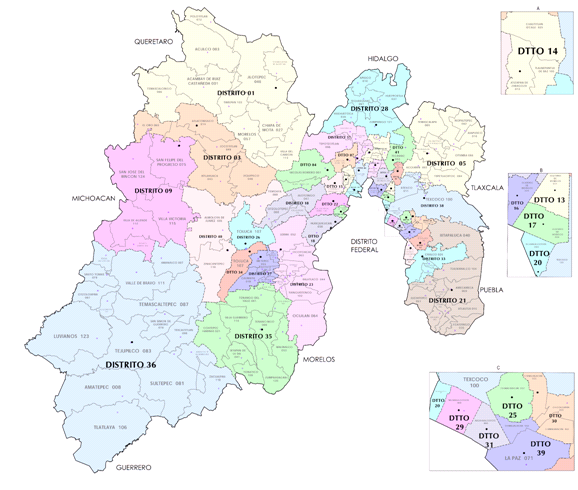
2017-2022 districting scheme

The 1st federal electoral district of the State of Mexico (Spanish: Distrito electoral federal 01 del Estado de México) is one of the 300 electoral districts into which Mexico is divided for elections to the federal Chamber of Deputies and one of 40 such districts in the State of Mexico.

It elects one deputy to the lower house of Congress for each three-year legislative session by means of the first-past-the-post system. Votes cast in the district also count towards the calculation of proportional representation ("plurinominal") deputies elected from the fifth region.

The current member for the district, elected in the 2024 general election, is María Luisa Mendoza Mondragón of the Ecologist Green Party of Mexico (PVEM).

== District territory ==
Under the 2023 districting plan adopted by the National Electoral Institute (INE), which is to be used for the 2024, 2027 and 2030 federal elections, the 1st district covers 213 electoral precincts (secciones electorales) across ten municipalities in the north of the state:

- Acambay, Aculco, Chapa de Mota, El Oro, Jilotepec, Morelos, Polotitlán, Soyaniquilpan de Juárez, Temascalcingo and Timilpan.

The district's head town (cabecera distrital), where results from individual polling stations are gathered together and tallied, is the city of Jilotepec de Molina Enríquez.

The district reported a population of 418,923 in the 2020 census. With Indigenous and Afrodescendent inhabitants accounting for over 49% of that number, it is classified by the INE as an indigenous district. (Note: Population figure indicates total inhabitants, not voters. The INE deems any local or federal electoral district where Indigenous or Afrodescendent inhabitants number 40% or more of the total to be an indigenous district.)

== Previous districting schemes ==
Evolution of electoral district numbers
	1974	1978	1996	2005	2017	2023
State of Mexico	15	34	36	40	41	40
Chamber of Deputies	196	300				

Under the previous districting plans enacted by the INE and its predecessors, the 1st district was situated as follows:

2017–2022

In the north-west of the state, covering the municipalities of Acambay, Aculco, Chapa de Mota, Jilotepec, Morelos, Polotitlán, Soyaniquilpan de Juárez, Temascalcingo, Timilpan and Villa del Carbón. The head town was at Jilotepec de Molina Enríquez.

2005–2017

In the north-west of the state, covering the municipalities of Acambay, Aculco, Atlacomulco, Jilotepec, Jocotitlán, Morelos, Polotitlán, Soyaniquilpan de Juárez y Timilpan. The head town was at Jilotepec de Molina Enríquez.

1996–2005

In the north-west of the state, covering the municipalities of Acambay, Aculco, Atlacomulco, Jilotepec, Jocotitlán, Morelos, Polotitlán, Soyaniquilpan de Juárez and Timilpan. The head town was at Atlacomulco.

1978–1996

In the south-west of the state, covering the municipalities of Almoloya de Alquisiras, Amatepec, Coatepec Harinas, Ixtapan de la Sal, Malinalco, Ocuilan, Otzoloapan, San Simón, Sultepec, Tejupilco, Tenancingo, Texcaltitlán, Tlatlaya, Tonatico, Villa Guerrero, Zacazonapan, Zacualpan and Zumpahuacán, with its head town at Tenancingo de Degollado.

== Deputies returned to Congress ==
(Mexico) National parties
- Current
- PAN
- PRI
- PT
- PVEM
- MC
- Morena
- PAZ
- Somos
- Defunct or local only
- PLM
- PNR
- PRM
- PNM
- PP
- PPS
- PARM
- PFCRN
- CON
- PANAL
- PSD
- PES
- PES
- PRD

State of Mexico's 1st district
Election	Deputy	Party	Term	Legislature
1916	Aldegundo Villaseñor		1916–1917	Constituent Congress of Querétaro
...
1955	José Guadalupe Cisneros Santamaría	Nationalist Party of Mexico	1955–1958	43rd Congress
...
1979	Juan Ugarte Cortés	Institutional Revolutionary Party	1979–1982	51st Congress
1982	Roberto Rubí Delgado	Institutional Revolutionary Party	1982–1985	52nd Congress
1985	Enrique Martínez Orta Flores	Institutional Revolutionary Party	1985–1988	53rd Congress
1988	Sara Esthela Velázquez Sánchez	Institutional Revolutionary Party	1988–1991	54th Congress
1991	Fernando Roberto Ordorica Pérez	Institutional Revolutionary Party	1991–1994	55th Congress
1994	Sergio Ramírez Vargas	Institutional Revolutionary Party	1994–1997	56th Congress
1997	Lino Cárdenas Sandoval	Institutional Revolutionary Party	1997–2000	57th Congress
2000	Hermilo Monroy Pérez	Institutional Revolutionary Party	2000–2003	58th Congress
2003	Arturo Osornio Sánchez	Institutional Revolutionary Party	2003–2006	59th Congress
2006	Jesús Alcántara Núñez	Institutional Revolutionary Party	2006–2009	60th Congress
2009	Héctor Eduardo Velasco Monroy	Institutional Revolutionary Party	2009–2012	61st Congress
2012	Miguel Sámano Peralta	Institutional Revolutionary Party	2012–2015	62nd Congress
2015	Édgar Castillo Martínez	Institutional Revolutionary Party	2015–2018	63rd Congress
2018	Ricardo Aguilar Castillo	Institutional Revolutionary Party	2018–2021	64th Congress
2021	Miguel Sámano Peralta	Institutional Revolutionary Party	2021–2024	65th Congress
2024	María Luisa Mendoza Mondragón	Ecologist Green Party of Mexico	2024–2027	66th Congress

== Presidential elections ==
State of Mexico's 1st district
Election	District won by	Party or coalition	%
2018	Andrés Manuel López Obrador	Juntos Haremos Historia	44.1450
2024	Claudia Sheinbaum Pardo	Sigamos Haciendo Historia	62.1554
