= 5th federal electoral district of the State of Mexico =

Federal electoral district of Mexico

State of Mexico's 5th
- Electoral district of the Chamber of Deputies of Mexico

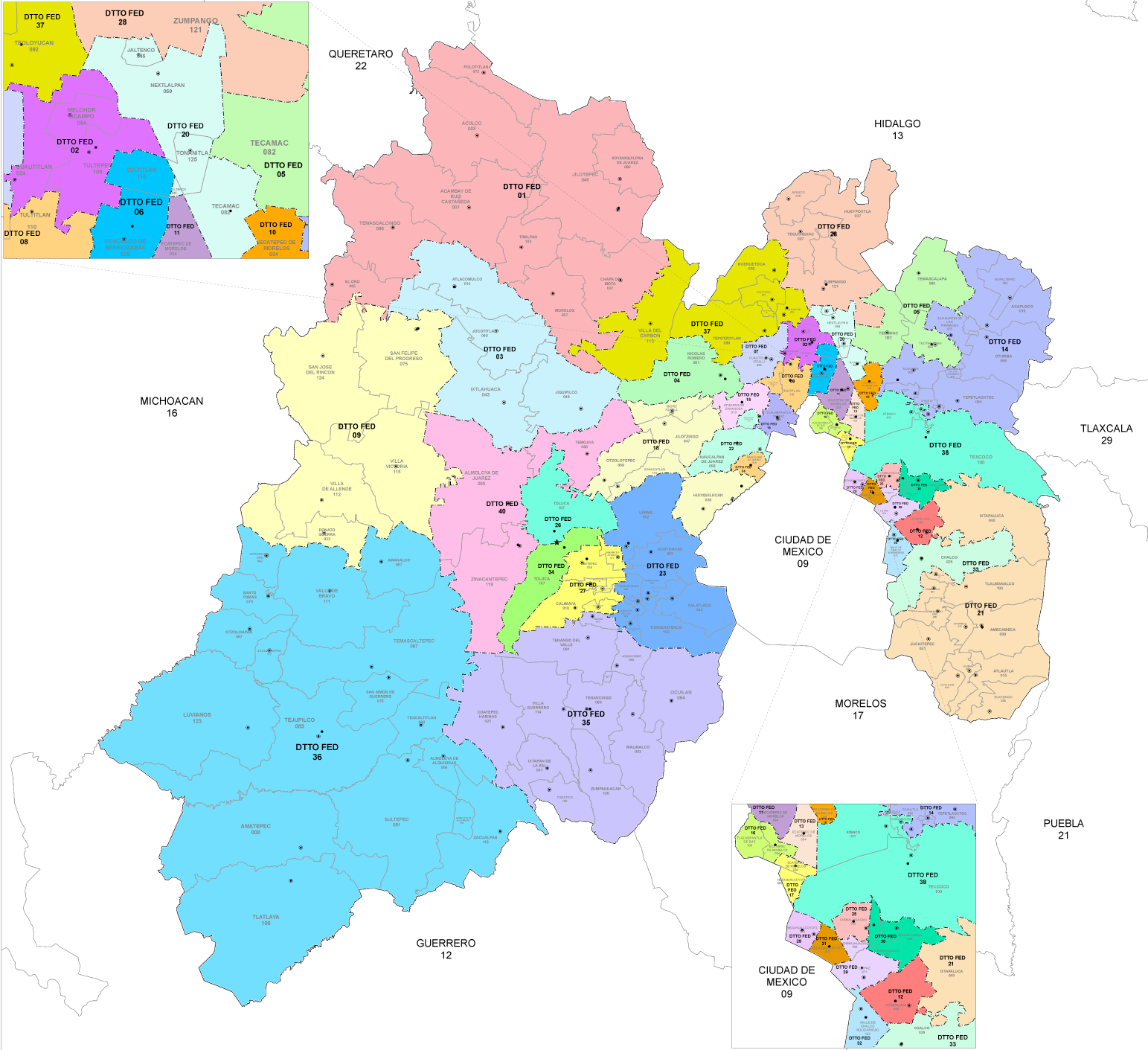
- State of Mexico's districts since 2023

Incumbent
- Member: Patricia Galindo Alarcón
- Party: ▌Labour Party
- Congress: 66th (2024–2027)

District
- State: State of Mexico
- Head town: Teotihuacán de Arista
- Coordinates: 19°41′N 98°51′W
- Covers: Teotihuacán, Temascalapa, Tecámac (part)
- PR region: Fifth
- Precincts: 95
- Population: 365,329 (2020 census)

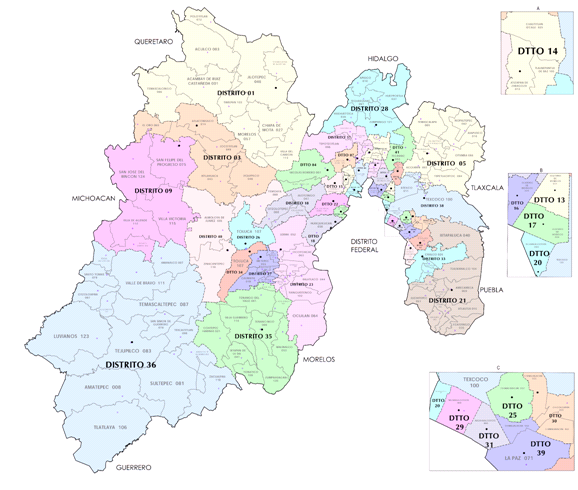
2017–2022 districting scheme

The 5th federal electoral district of the State of Mexico (Spanish: Distrito electoral federal 05 del Estado de México) is one of the 300 electoral districts into which Mexico is divided for elections to the federal Chamber of Deputies and one of 40 such districts in the State of Mexico.

It elects one deputy to the lower house of Congress for each three-year legislative session by means of the first-past-the-post system. Votes cast in the district also count towards the calculation of proportional representation ("plurinominal") deputies elected from the fifth region.

The current member for the district, elected in the 2024 general election, is Patricia Galindo Alarcón of the Labour Party (PT).

== District territory ==
Under the 2023 districting plan adopted by the National Electoral Institute (INE), which is to be used for the 2024, 2027 and 2030 federal elections, the 5th district covers 95 electoral precincts (secciones electorales) across three municipalities in the north-east of the state:

- Teotihuacán, Temascalapa and the northern portion of Tecámac. (Note: The remainder of Tecámac is assigned to the 20th district.)

The head town (cabecera distrital), where results from individual polling stations are gathered together and tallied, is Teotihuacán de Arista. In the 2020 census, the district reported a total population of 365,329.

== Previous districting schemes ==
Evolution of electoral district numbers
	1974	1978	1996	2005	2017	2023
State of Mexico	15	34	36	40	41	40
Chamber of Deputies	196	300				

Under the previous districting plans enacted by the INE and its predecessors, the 5th district was situated as follows:

2017–2022

The municipalities of Acolman, Axapusco, Chiautla, Nopaltepec, Papalotla, Otumba, San Martín de las Pirámides, Temascalapa, Teotihuacán and Tepetlaoxtoc. The head town was at Teotihuacán de Arista.

2005–2017

The municipalities of Acolman, Atenco, Axapusco, Chiautla, Chiconcuac, Nopaltepec, Otumba, Papalotla, San Martín de las Pirámides, Temascalapa, Teotihuacán and Tepetlaoxtoc. The head town was at Teotihuacán de Arista.

1996–2005

The municipalities of Acolman, Axapusco, Nopaltepec, Otumba, San Martín de las Pirámides, Tecámac, Temascalapa, Teotihuacán, Tepetlaoxtoc and Tezoyuca. The head town was at Teotihuacán de Arista.

1978–1996

The municipalities of Acambay, Aculco, Atlacomulco, Chapa de Mota, El Oro, Jilotepec, Jocotitlán, Morelos, Polotitlán, Soyaniquilpan de Juárez, Temascalcingo and Timilpan, with its head town at Atlacomulco.

== Deputies returned to Congress ==
(Mexico) National parties
- Current
- PAN
- PRI
- PT
- PVEM
- MC
- Morena
- PAZ
- Somos
- Defunct or local only
- PLM
- PNR
- PRM
- PNM
- PP
- PPS
- PARM
- PFCRN
- CON
- PANAL
- PSD
- PES
- PES
- PRD

State of Mexico's 5th district
Election	Deputy	Party	Term	Legislature
1916	None		1916–1917	Constituent Congress of Querétaro
...
1979	Antonio Huitrón Huitrón	Institutional Revolutionary Party	1979–1982	51st Congress
1982	Antonio Vélez Torres	Institutional Revolutionary Party	1982–1985	52nd Congress
1985	Regina Reyes Retana	Institutional Revolutionary Party	1985–1988	53rd Congress
1988	Jaime Almazán Delgado	Institutional Revolutionary Party	1988–1991	54th Congress
1991	Crescencio Pérez Garduño	Institutional Revolutionary Party	1991–1994	55th Congress
1994	Regina Reyes Retana	Institutional Revolutionary Party	1994–1997	56th Congress
1997	Eduardo Guadalupe Bernal Martínez	Institutional Revolutionary Party	1997–2000	57th Congress
2000	Tereso Martínez Aldana	National Action Party (Mexico)	2000–2003	58th Congress
2003	Gaspar Ávila Rodríguez	Institutional Revolutionary Party	2003–2006	59th Congress
2006	José Antonio Saavedra Coronel	Party of the Democratic Revolution	2006–2009	60th Congress
2009	Felipe Borja Texocotitla	Institutional Revolutionary Party	2009–2012	61st Congress
2012	Darío Zacarías Capuchino	Institutional Revolutionary Party	2012–2015	62nd Congress
2015	Cristina Sánchez Coronel	Institutional Revolutionary Party	2015–2018	63rd Congress
2018	Francisco Favela Peñuñuri	Labour Party (Mexico)	2018–2021	64th Congress
2021	Francisco Favela Peñuñuri	Labour Party (Mexico)	2021–2024	65th Congress
2024	Patricia Galindo Alarcón	Labour Party (Mexico)	2024–2027	66th Congress

== Presidential elections ==
State of Mexico's 5th district
Election	District won by	Party or coalition	%
2018	Andrés Manuel López Obrador	Juntos Haremos Historia	57.1571
2024	Claudia Sheinbaum Pardo	Sigamos Haciendo Historia	63.5136
