= Atlacomulco Region =

Region II (Spanish: Región 2. Atlacomulco) is an intrastate region within the State of Mexico, one of 16. It borders the states of Querétaro Hidalgo and Michoacán in the northwest corner of the state. The region comprises sixteen municipalities: Acambay, Aculco, Atlacomulco, Ixtlahuaca, Jocotitlán, Timilpan. It is largely rural.

== Municipalities ==
- Acambay
- Aculco
- Atlacomulco
- Jilotepec
- Jocotitlán
- Polotitlán
- San Felipe del Progreso
- Timilpan
