= Jilotepec =

Jilotepec may refer to:

- Jilotepec Municipality, State of Mexico, or
  - Jilotepec de Abasolo, also known as Jilotepec de Molina Enríquez, the municipal seat
- the municipality of Jilotepec, Veracruz, or its municipal seat of the same name
