= Villa del Carbón =

- Municipality
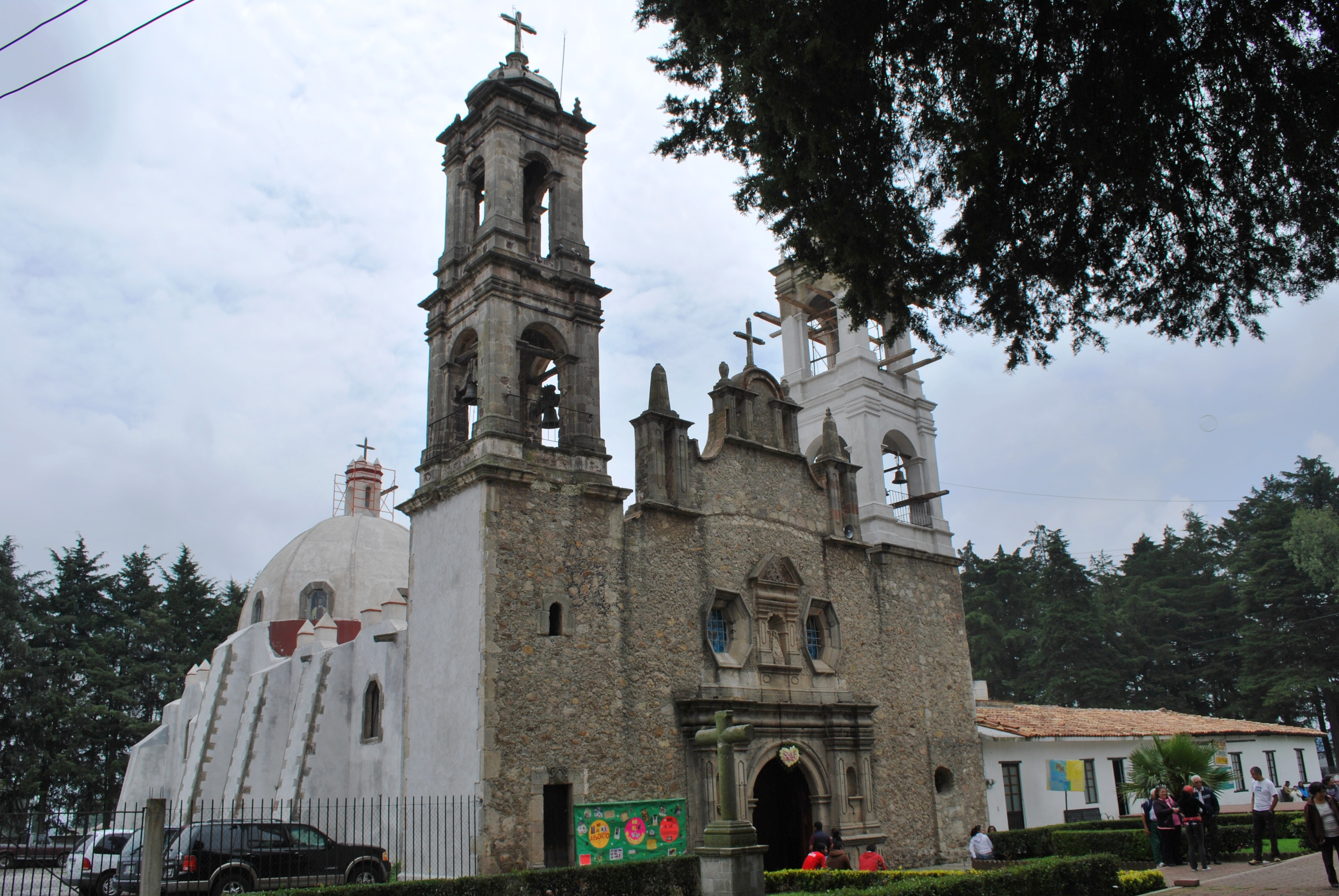
- Temple of Nuestra Señora Santa María de la Peña de Francia

- Coat of arms

- Location in Mexico
- Coordinates: 19°43′38″N 99°32′30″W
- Country: Mexico
- State: State of Mexico
- Municipal Seat: Villa del Carbón
- Town Founded: 1714
- Municipality Created: 1821

Government
  - Municipal President: Ofelia Antonio Sandoval

Area
  - Municipality: 356.14 km^{2} (137.51 sq mi)
- Elevation (of seat): 2,600 m (8,500 ft)

Population (2005) Municipality
  - Municipality: 39,587
  - Seat: 8,029
- Time zone: UTC-6 (Central)
- Postal code (of seat): 54300
- Area code: 588
- Website: (in Spanish) site

Villa del Carbón is a municipality located in the northern part of Mexico State, just northwest of Mexico City. While the town and municipal seat of Villa del Carbón is the largest in the municipality, it is not the oldest. The municipality contains a number of villages of Otomí and Nahua origins, in which much of the indigenous culture still survives. The municipality's territory was defined in 1714 when a region known as Chiapan, split into what is now Chapa de Mota and Villa del Carbón. At that time, however, the community which is now a municipal seat did not have an official name; it was known first only by the name of its church Nuestra Señora de la Peña de Francia, and later by being a major supplier of charcoal. This would lead to the name of Villanueva del Carbón de Nuestra Señora Santa María de la Peña de Francia, which eventually shortened to Villa del Carbón. The major portions of the municipality's glyph, which serves as it coat-of-arms, does not reflect the town of Villa del Carbón but rather two of its oldest communities: Taxhimay and San Lorenzo Pueblo Nuevo.

The municipality covers an area of 356.14 km^{2} and has a total population of 39,587 (2005 census). Of this total, 8,029 live in the municipal seat of Villa del Carbón and the rest live among the other 57 communities which rely on the seat for government purposes. The municipality border the municipalities of Jilotepec, Jiquipilco, Tepotzotlán, Nicolas Romero, Chapa de Mota and Morelos in Mexico State, with Tepejí del Río, Hidalgo State bordering it to the north. The municipality is divided into three "barrios" or districts named Pendo, Centro, and Taxhihué. Today, the municipality's economy is based primarily on tourism, as it has a number of streams, rivers and dams suitable for water sports, trout-fishing and camping facilities. It is also the home of a nationally recognized charreada(a type of rodeo) venue, that hosts major events.

== The municipal seat ==
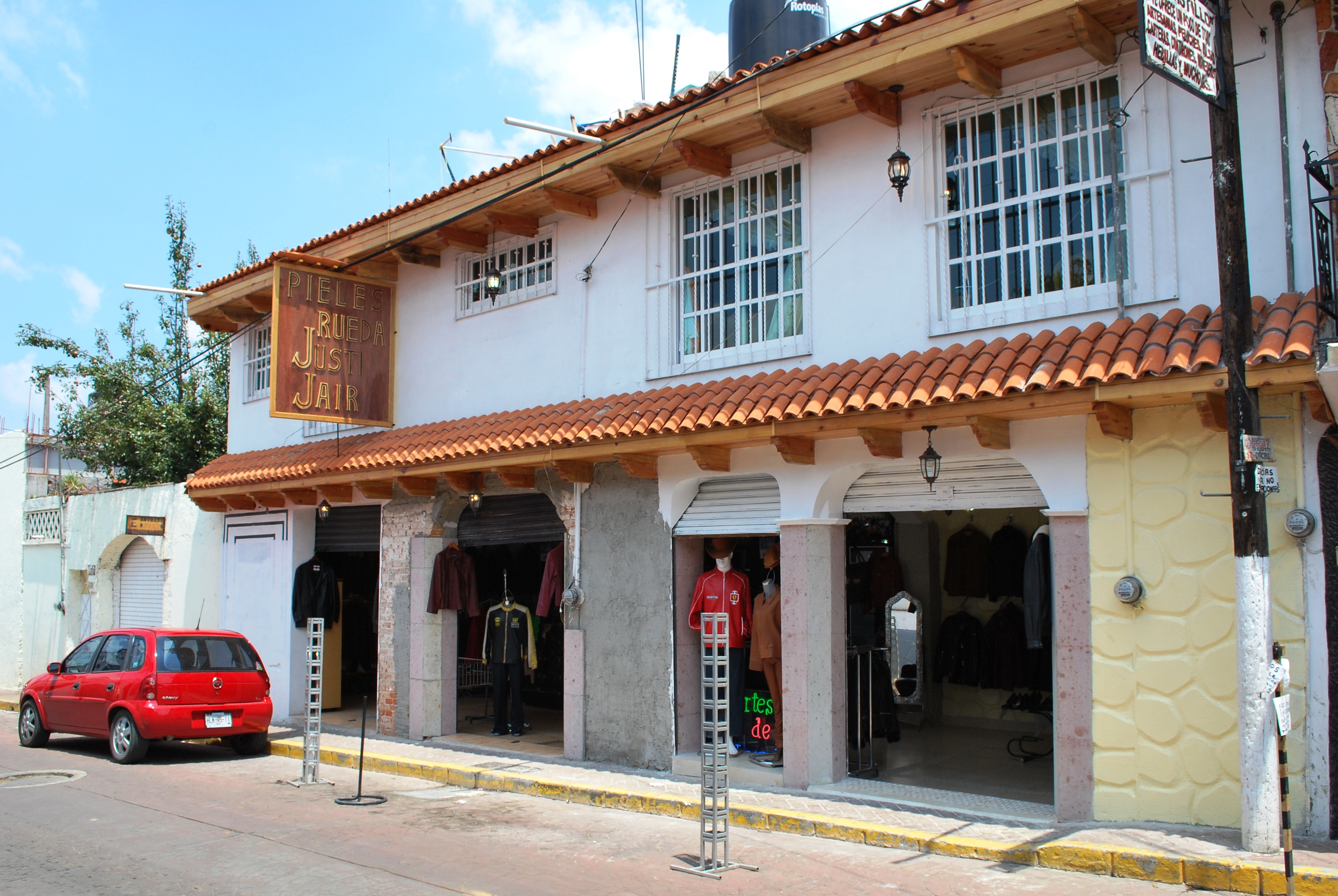
A traditional structure in the municipal seat

The town of Villa del Carbón lies near the center of the municipality at an altitude of 2,600 meters above sea level and has a population of 8,029 (2005 census). Most of the houses and other buildings in this town have white facades with pitched roofs covered in Spanish-style clay tile. The roads in the center of town are of cobblestone.

The main church of the town is called the Temple of Nuestra Señora de la Peña de Francia. It was constructed between 1700 and 1740 and is the origin of this particular community in the municipality. The church was originally constructed to house an image of the Virgin Mary called "La Virgen de la Peña de Francia," which is one of only two brought to Mexico from Spain. The other is in Salamanca, Guanajuato. Those living around the church were not part of a named town, they were only known as "those who make charcoal." People looking to locate this community were directed to the church of the community that made charcoal (and is the origin of the town's name). This Virgin is black, like charcoal, and over time, many miracles became attributed to her. For this reason, this image was hidden by the local people for many years in fear that the authorities would take it from them. Today, however, she is plainly on display at the main altar. The church itself is a typical one for the early 18th century and reminiscent of Romantic style. In 1904, Crispín Montiel painted the cupola of the church with Biblical personages. The large trees on the church property date back to the founding of the municipality. To the side of the church is the Luisa Isabel Campos de Jiménez Cantú Municipal Park, which contains an open-air Greek-style theatre, surrounded by pine trees.

Across from the church is the main town plaza called Plaza Hidalgo, which was built and named in 1906 in preparation for the upcoming centennial of Mexico's Independence. The kiosk in the center was the site of the town's fountain, which used to provide potable water for the community. The kiosk contains the tourist information center for the municipality. The plaza was remodeled during town renovation work in the 1960s and 1970s, which is when the current palms and giant eucalyptus trees were planted.

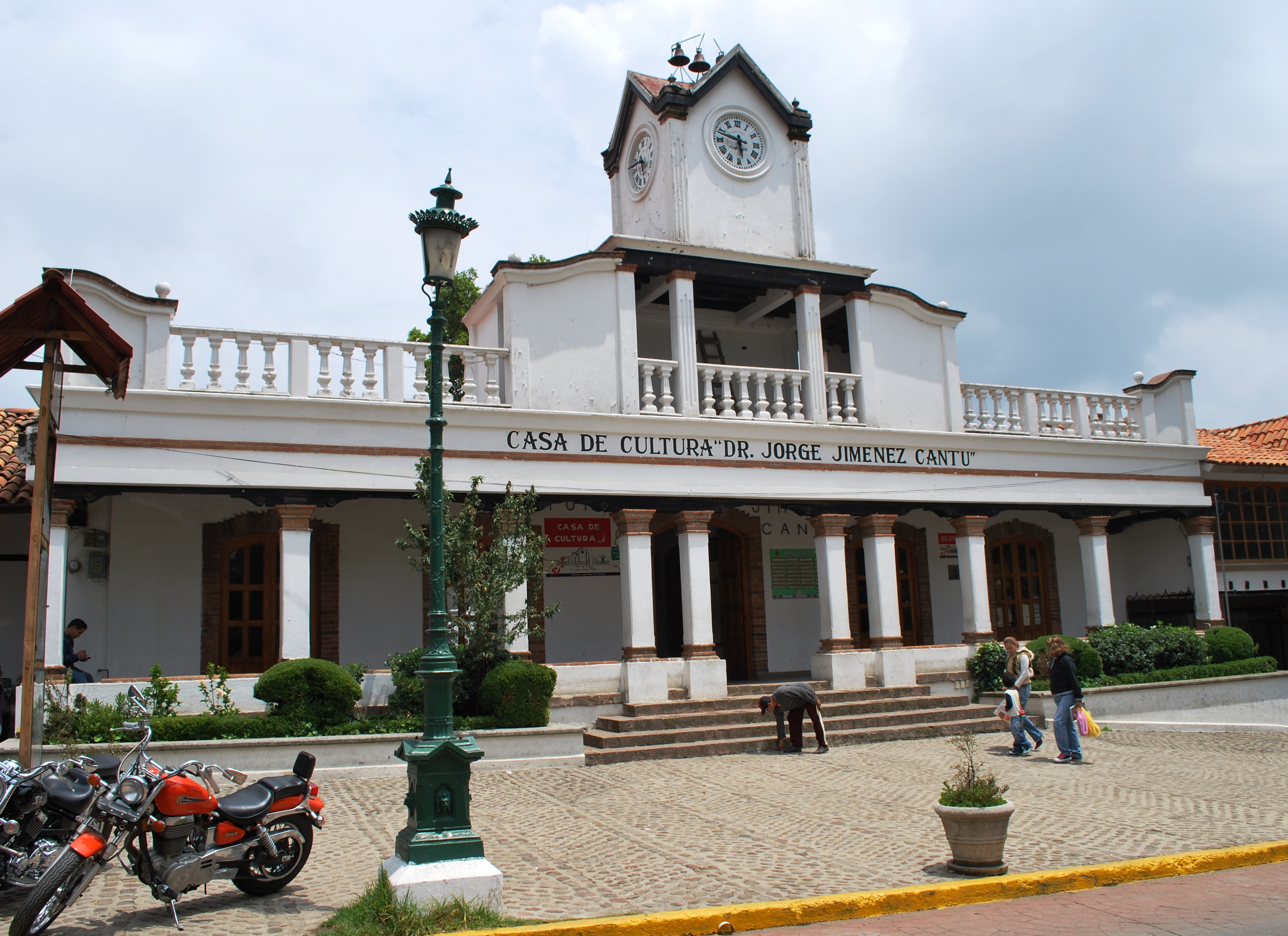
Casa de Cultura Dr. Jorge Jiménez Cantú

Aside from the church, the plaza is surrounded by the old and new municipal palaces, a number of residential structures with shops on the ground floors. The old municipal building site is now the Casa de Cultura Dr. Jorge Jiménez Cantú. The original municipal palace was built at the end of the 17th century and was of Neoclassical architecture. By 1926, the old building had deteriorated enough to warrant demolition. A new, two-story building was constructed and inaugurated in 1931. This center contains the municipality library, an auditorium and a continuing education center.

Due to its traditional architecture and surrounding scenery, the town was included as one of the Pueblos con Encanto (Towns with Charm) program of the State of Mexico. The town has been actively seeking to take advantage of it, advertising itself as such and participating in the Pueblos con Encanto Bicentenario (Bicentennial Towns with Charm) program in preparation for Mexico Bicentennial of Independence in 2010. In September 2015, the town was also included to the Pueblos Mágicos (Magical Towns) national program.

== Other communities in the municipality ==
While the town of Villa del Carbon is the largest community in the municipality, it is not the oldest. The oldest communities in the municipality are Cachihuapan, Taxhimay, Temanacoya y Zacapexco. Zacapexco is located to the West of the municipal seat and is old enough to be mentioned in the Huamantla Codex which was written in the 16th or 17th century as one of the Otomí groups to have left the cave in Chiapan to settle on the Zacatepexco Hill. The name Zacatepexco is from Nahuatl meaning "where there is a staw bed." Another ancient community is the village of Taxhimay, located North of the municipal seat. Its name come from Otomí and means "pasture of white sheep," as it is one of the few areas in the municipality with significant pasture land.

To the north of this community is the Taxhimay Hacienda, which was owned by a major textile family from Tepeji del Río. In 1931, the Taxhimay Dam was built near here, which completely inundated the small village of San Luis de las Peras. This hacienda provided the space to the villages resettlement.

The oldest communities of this municipality are of Otomí or Nahua ethnicity. The Otomí arrived to this area first and their most representative villages are Taxhimay, Piequexhimó and San Lorenzo Pueblo Nuevo. The later Nahua villages are represented by Cachihuapan, San Luis Anáhuac, Temanacoya and Xajay. Both sets of communities retain many of their cultural roots. There is a story that when the communities of San Luis Taxhimay (Otomí) and San Luis Anáhuac (Nahua) were being "refounded" as Spanish colonial villages, there was a dispute between them as to who should become the custodian of which of two saint images: one of Saint Louis, King of France and one of Our Lord of Lament. The story states that the dispute was finally settled by a coin toss, with the first image going to San Luis Anáhuac and the latter to San Luis Taxhimay.

== Geography ==
The municipality of Villa del Carbón is located in the north of Mexico State, northwest of Mexico City. Much of the territory consists of rugged hills and mountains, with the high point being Cerro de la Bufa, at 3,600 meters above sea level. These hills and mountains join with the Sierra de Tepotzotlán to the east. These mountains here are known at the Sierra de Monte Alto. These mountains are covered in conifer forests and account for 58% of the municipality. Semi-arid rolling hills cover 34% and only about 9% is flat land, generally found in small isolated patches.

=== Climate ===
The high altitude of between 2,300 and 3,600 meters gives the municipality a temperate climate, with freezing temperatures not uncommon in the winter. The highlands have a wet climate, while the lower hills can be semi-arid. Significant winds are present in much of the municipality.

=== Hydrography ===
The relatively abundant rains at the high elevations give rise to a large number of small fresh-water springs, which create small streams that eventually join into the municipality's four rivers: the San Jeronimo, Las Animas, Los Sabios and El Oro. There is one other "river" called the "Río Seco" (Dry River) which flows only during the rainy season. Most of the bodies of water here have been created by the El Llano, Taxhimay, Benito Juárez and Molinitos Dams, with only one natural lake called Santa Catarina.

== History ==
Early human settlement in the Villa del Carbón area is demonstrated by cave paintings at a rock shelter located near the San Jeronimo River. The first known ethnicity to settle here are the Otomí, who called this area "Nñonthe" (top of the hill) Evidence of their early occupation is found in the way of primitive ceramic and human and animal figurines. These Otomí would be joined by other nomadic groups, who eventually synthesized their language and mythology. As they did so, this area became known as the Otomí region of Chiapan, which rough correlates with the modern-day municipalities of Villa del Carbón and Chapa de Mota. This region, along with neighboring Xillotepec (today Jilotepec) had significant influence in the early Mesoamerican world, as it was located where commercial traffic between Tula and Teotihuacan passed. This would lead to a number of fortifications and other structures. Remains of these can be found today such as the fortifications at Cañada and Taxhimay, the ceremonial mound at El Mogote and a highly deteriorated and overgrown set of buildings known as Iglesias Viejas (Old Churches). The oldest currently existing communities are still Otomí in character. This is because unlike their early neighbors, the Mazahuas and the Matlatzincas, the Otomí favored areas with rugged terrain, so they dominated this area until about the 12th century. Later, Nahua people would come and settle in the area. By the 15th century, however, the Aztecs (a Nahua people) would dominate this area, making the Otomí a tributary people.

This would end with the Spanish Conquest of the Aztec Empire in the early 16th century. In the late 16th century, a number of Spanish families began renting lands from local chiefs here on which to raise cattle and sheep. These ranches would lead to more Spanish immigration to the area, who intermarried with the local population. During most of the colonial period, until 1714, the Chiapan area remained intact as an entity. In 1714, the area was split in what are now roughly the municipalities of Chapa de Mota and Villa del Carbón. At that time, however, the community which is now the municipal seat was only known by through its church as the "Congregation of Santa María de la Peña de Francia." Later in the colonial period the community also became known as a major supplier of charcoal to surrounding communities such as San Pedro Atzcapotzaltongo, Magú, Cañada de Cisneros and even Mexico City. This activity gave it the moniker of "Villa Nueva del Carbón de nuestra Señora Santa María de la Peña de Francia" (New Village of Charcoal of Our Lady of Holy Mary of the Hill of France. It also gave rise to a number of legends. In order to identify the community, one would be directed to the Villa Nueva, en donde hacen carbon" (the New Village, where they make charcoal), which eventually led to the place being marked on maps simply as "El Carbón" and verbally, the phrase became contracted to Villa del Carbón.

When the Mexican War of Independence broke out in 1810, Villa del Carbon and the surrounding communities did not immediately join in with Miguel Hidalgo's cause. Support came after the nearby Battle of Monte de las Cruces in 1810, which Hidalgo won. After that, many from here decided to join Hidalgo's army. One notable participant from the municipal seat is José Manuel Correa, aka, José María Correa who fought with Pino, Arriaga, and Chito Villagrán and defeating the royalist commander Andrade en Venta Hermosa in 1811.

In the years immediately following Independence, this municipality suffered from the lack of political stability, which led to high crime rates, especially highway robbery. The rugged terrain here was ideal for these marauders to prey upon travelers and protect themselves from authorities. Finally in 1834, President Antonio López de Santa Anna ordered Commander Francisco de Medina Troncoso y Ruizgómez to the region to combat the bandits, who had become extremely brazen. These forces fought with the bandits at their fortifications around Villa del Carbon, managing to overrun them in five days. In celebration, the bells of the church of Villa del Carbón rang out.

Another important event in the history of Villa del Carbón is the arrival of the captured Melchor Ocampo in 1861 to be imprisoned at the Los Fresnos House. Later, he was transferred to Tepeji del Río, Hidalgo, where he was eventually executed. During the French Intervention in 1863, Villa del Carbón sided with the Maximilian, forming a regiment led by Colonel Patricio Garnada to fight for the emperor. The municipal seat was burned later in 1863 by Cuellar, including the priest's house.

During the Mexican Revolution, there is some evidence that the town had recurrent problems the Liberation Army of the South, such as the severing of telegraph lines. During the Cristero War, the town lost one of its leaders in 1928. In 1931, the town was electrified and was reached by its first highway, connecting the municipal seat to San Martín Cachihuapan. In this same year, the new municipal palace, zocalo and municipal park were built. The municipal palace's clock was installed in 1943.

In the 1920s and 1930s a number of ejidos such as San Lorenzo el Viejo, San Luis Anahua and Monte de Peña were created.

== Economy ==
=== Tourism ===
Tourism is the major source of income for the municipality, based on its natural resources. The various small streams fed by fresh-water springs converge into four rivers in the territory. These rivers were dammed in the first half of the 20th century, originally for agricultural purposes but they have become an important source of tourism, including ecotourism revenue. There are four main dams that attract tourists: Taxhimay, El Llano, Molinitos and Benito Juárez. These dams offer a number of activities, such as mountain biking, hiking, rappelling, swimming, jet skiing, kayaking, canoeing, sailing and sport fishing, especially for trout. Accommodations here include tent and RV camping facilities and rustic cabins.

The largest and most important dam economically is the Taxhimay Dam. It was constructed in 1934, flooding the valley and covering the small community of San Luis de las Peras, leaving only the church tower and part of the cupola visible above the water. Canoe tours to visit the tower and cupola are available. In addition to offering the activities listed above, it also hosts the annual XTERRA Triathlon. The El Llano Dam is 20 km from the town of Villa del Carbón and is located within a state park, which is also part of the Zacapexco ejido. The area has a relatively cold climate and the dam is surrounded by conifer forests.

Two smaller dams, the Benito Juárez and Molinitos are still primarily also offer many activities but on a smaller scale.

Trout has become an important economic resource. The large number of rivers and streams that feed into dams have created places to fish for trout as well as trout-farming. In locations like the Taxhimay Dam, boat rentals for fishing include cooking what you catch. Trout-farms raise and sell the fish to locales inside and outside of Villa del Carbón. There are also a number of restaurants dedicated to cuisine based on trout and other forest products. These restaurants are mostly located were rivers run near the highways to Mexico City and Atlacomulco.

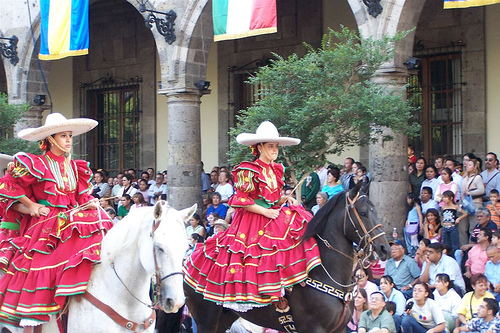
Female participants in charreada

In and around the municipal seat, charreada is a major part of the local culture and competitions here have gone national. The main sponsor of these events is the Villa de Carbón Charreada Association, which has gained statues in the charreada world over the years. This association now hosts national-level competitions at the Lienzo Charro Cornielio Nieto, located just outside the town of Villa del Carbón. One particular group of note is the Escaramuza Charra (a group of twelve women who perform choreographed equine displays). This group has placed in the top three in many regional and national-level competitions and placed fifth in the national championships of 2005. Villa del Carbón main charreada events take place on March 10 (founding of the municipality), September 16 (Mexican Independence) and December 8 (Feast day of the patron saint of Villa del Carbón). On these days, the events are accompanies by musical events, dances, craft expositions and regional cuisine.

=== Handcrafts ===
With ranches and charreadas an important part of Villa de Carbón's history and culture, crafts related to these, especially leather-making and leather products. Principal goods made are boots, leather jackets, hats and other items related to the needs of horsemen. Crafts-production employs significant percentage of the municipality's residents. The most important item produced here is called "botines," which is a kind of ankle-high boot associated with charreada. Villa del Carbón is one of the last locations in Mexico to be a significant producer of this footwear and they are exported to many locations in the country. Another craft practiced here is the making of knit items such as scarves, ponchos, wraps, sweaters, etc. These are mostly available at the tianguis (temporary market) that pops up on weekends at Plaza Hidalgo in the town center. Lastly, the town also has a number of "rompope" (a sweet egg liqueur) producers. Rompope was brought to Mexico by Spanish friars and its production here originated with the monasteries they established. Over time, however, its production fell into secular hands.
