= Huamango =

Archaeological site in Mexico

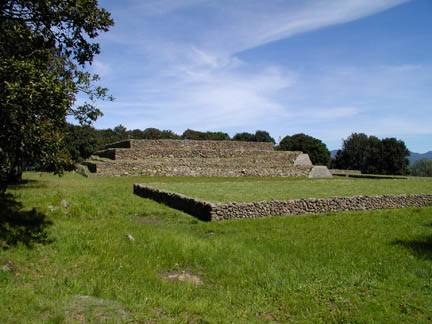
- Huamango archaeological site
- Interactive map of Huamango
- 19°58′44″N 99°51′58″W
- Type: Mesoamerican archaeology
- Periods: Mesoamerican early Postclassical
- Cultures: Otomí (Hñähñu, Hñähño, Ñuhu, Ñhato, Ñuhmu) – Toltec
- Location: Acambay, Municipality of Acambay, Mexico State, Mexico
- Region: Mesoamerica

History
- Built: First occupation 900 to 1100 CE. Second from 1100 to 1300 CE.

Site notes
- Website: Huamango Archaeological Site

Huamango is an early Postclassical (Toltec period) archaeological site located about 4 kilometers northwest of the modern city of Acambay in the State of Mexico. The archaeological area is on the San Miguel plateau, in the vicinity of the Peña Picuda hill, at an approximate altitude of 2,850 meters above sea level. It is rich in legends, stories and ancestral traditions.

The site has vestiges of a city inhabited by the Otomi culture, which dominated the Acambay Valley, strategically located by the apparent defensive needs in the dispute over control of territory and trade routes.

Huamango was most likely a major political capital in the area immediately north of the Toluca Valley during Early Postclassical times, perhaps subsidiary in some way to the Toltec polity centered at Tula to the northeast.

The site is maintained by the Instituto Mexiquense de Cultura, a branch of the State of Mexico. It is easy to reach by car, about an hour's drive north of Toluca, and a few km north-west of Acambay.

== Prehistory ==
In prehistoric State of Mexico, the Tepexpan man is an important finding for Mexican and foreign anthropologists; it is an important key to understand what the Valley of Mexico area was like 5,000 years ago. It also helped to establish the occupation chronology of the region. Some scholars attribute an age of 11 thousand years, others 8 thousand, and some have suggested 5 thousand years old. This individual, originally identified as a male, recent research confirm a female identity, although this is still subject of discussion.

Sacrum bone found in Tequixquiac is considered a work of prehistoric art. The town was inhabited in 35,000 BCE by people who had crossed the Bering Strait from Asia. These people were nomadic, hunting large animals such as mammoths and gathering fruits, as evidenced by archaeological evidence found at the site. One of the most salient discoveries of primitive art in America was found in here, called the Tequixquiac Bone, which had no known purpose, but reflected the ideological sense of the artist who carved the piece of bone from a camelid around 22,000 years BCE. The first native settlers of Tequixquiac were the Aztecs and Otomi, who decided to settle there permanently for the abundance of rivers and springs. They were engaged mainly in agriculture and the breeding of domestic animals.

The earliest evidence of human habitation in current territory of the state is a quartz scraper and obsidian blade found in the Tlapacoya area, which was an island in the former Lake Chalco. They are dated to the Pleistocene era which dates human habitation back to 20,000 years. These first peoples were hunter-gatherers. Stone age implements have been found all over the territory from mammoth bones, to stone tools to human remains. Most have been found in the areas of Los Reyes Acozac, Tizayuca, Tepexpan, San Francisco Mazapa, El Risco and Tequixquiac. Between 20,000 and 5,000 B.C.E., the people here eventually went from hunting and gathering to sedimentary villages with farming and domesticated animals. The main crop was corn, and stone tools for the grinding of this grain become common. Later crops include beans, chili peppers and squash grown near established villages. Evidence of ceramics appears around 2,500 B.C.E. with the earliest artifacts of these appearing in Tlapacoya, Atoto, Malinalco, Acatzingo and Tlatilco.

== History ==
Toward the fifth millennium BCE, Oto-Manguean languages speaking peoples formed a large unit. Language diversification and geographical expansion, which has been proposed as their "Urheimat", that is, the Tehuacán valley (current state of Puebla) should have occurred after the domestication of the Mesoamerican agricultural trinity, composed by corn, beans and chile pepper. This is based on the large amount of cognates in the repertoire of words alluding to agriculture in the Oto-manguean languages. After the development of an incipient agriculture, the proto-manguean language gave rise to two distinct languages that constitute the current eastern and western groups of the Oto-manguean family background. Continuing with the linguistic evidence, it seems likely that Pames - members of the western branch - reached the Basin of Mexico around of the fourth millennium of the Christian era and that, in what some authors argue, have not migrated northward but south.

The earliest major civilization of the state is Teotihuacan, with the Pyramids of the Sun and Moon being built between 100 B.C.E and 100 C.E. Between 800 and 900 C.E., the Matlatzincas established their dominion with Teotenango as capital. This city is walled with plazas, terraces, temples, altars, living quarters and a Mesoamerican ball game court. In the 15th century, the Aztecs conquered the Toluca and Chalco valleys to the west and east of the Valley of Mexico respectively. Part of the Toluca Valley was held by the Purépecha as well. Other dominions during the pre-Hispanic period include that of the Chichimecas in Tenayuca and of the Acolhuas in Huexotla, Texcotzingo and Los Melones. Other important groups were the Mazahuas in the Atlacomulco area. Their center was at Mazahuacán, next to Jocotitlán mountain. The Otomis were centered in Jilotepec.

Historiographical texts on Mesoamerican prehispanic peoples have paid little attention to the Otomí history. Many centuries ago, in the territory occupied the Otomi flourished large cities like Cuicuilco, Teotihuacán and Tula. Even in the Aztec Triple Alliance which dominated the Aztec Empire, Tlacopan inherited the Azcapotzalco domains with a majority of Otomi people. However, the Otomi culture is hardly ever mentioned as protagonists of Mesoamerican prehispanic history, perhaps because the ethnic complexity of the Mexico plateau at that time does not permit distinguishing the contributions of the Otomi ancient from those produced by their neighbors. Only until recent years there seems to develop an interest on the role they played by the Otomi in the development of the Mexican plateau cultures, from the Mesoamerican preclassical period thru 1521 CE.

Huamango flourished and had its apogee between 900 and 1300 CE. Based on research investigations, it is established that the site occupants formed a hegemonic religious group. It has not yet been established the Huamango constructors cultural affiliation, although ethnic-historical sources information allow the assumption that these are groups of Otomi origins, ancestors of the current Otomi living in the place.

=== Etymology ===
Huamango, means "place where Wood is carved" in the Nahuatl language.

This ancient settlement stands majestically in a geological formation known as the San Miguel Huamango Camaye Plateau, formed by Andesite extrusive igneous rocks.

About the name Acambay, it is based on ancient documents that mention that this region was called, in Otomi language, Cambay o Cabaye, which may be translated as "God’s Rock" (okha= "God", mbaye= "Rock").

A different theory claims the name is from the Purépecha language, from the word Akamba that means maguey or agave and the "rhi" desinence that means; Akambari or "Place of Magueyes".

=== Investigations ===
Huamango was discovered by architect Edgar Serrano Pérez.

The site was excavated by Román Piña Chán and William Folan in the 1970s. It consists of a small ceremonial zone with some temples, located on a ridge overlooking the Valle de los Espejos. Although the dating of Huamango is not as certain as one would like, various lines of evidence point to an Early Postclassic (Toltec period) date for the site (A.D. 900 - 1100).

Archaeological investigations have placed various different hierarchy prehispanic settlements, among these Huamango was chosen because it represents the best example of the Otomi culture monumental architecture, in the region.

Following Piña Chan research, tentatively, two occupation periods have been established: one from 900 to 1100 CE, with similarities to the archaeological area of Tula (incense smokers, braziers and ceramic pots, as burial offerings); and another around 1200-1300 CE, which presents evidence that correlates with sites such as Teotenango and Calixtlahuaca.

Burials excavated at the site yielded ceramic offering vessels in a distinctive polychrome style. The lack of Coyotlatelco ceramics is a good sign that the site does not date to the epiclassical period (700-900 CE), and the presence of some types similar to Tollan-phase Tula supports the early postclassical dating.

=== Otomi Culture ===
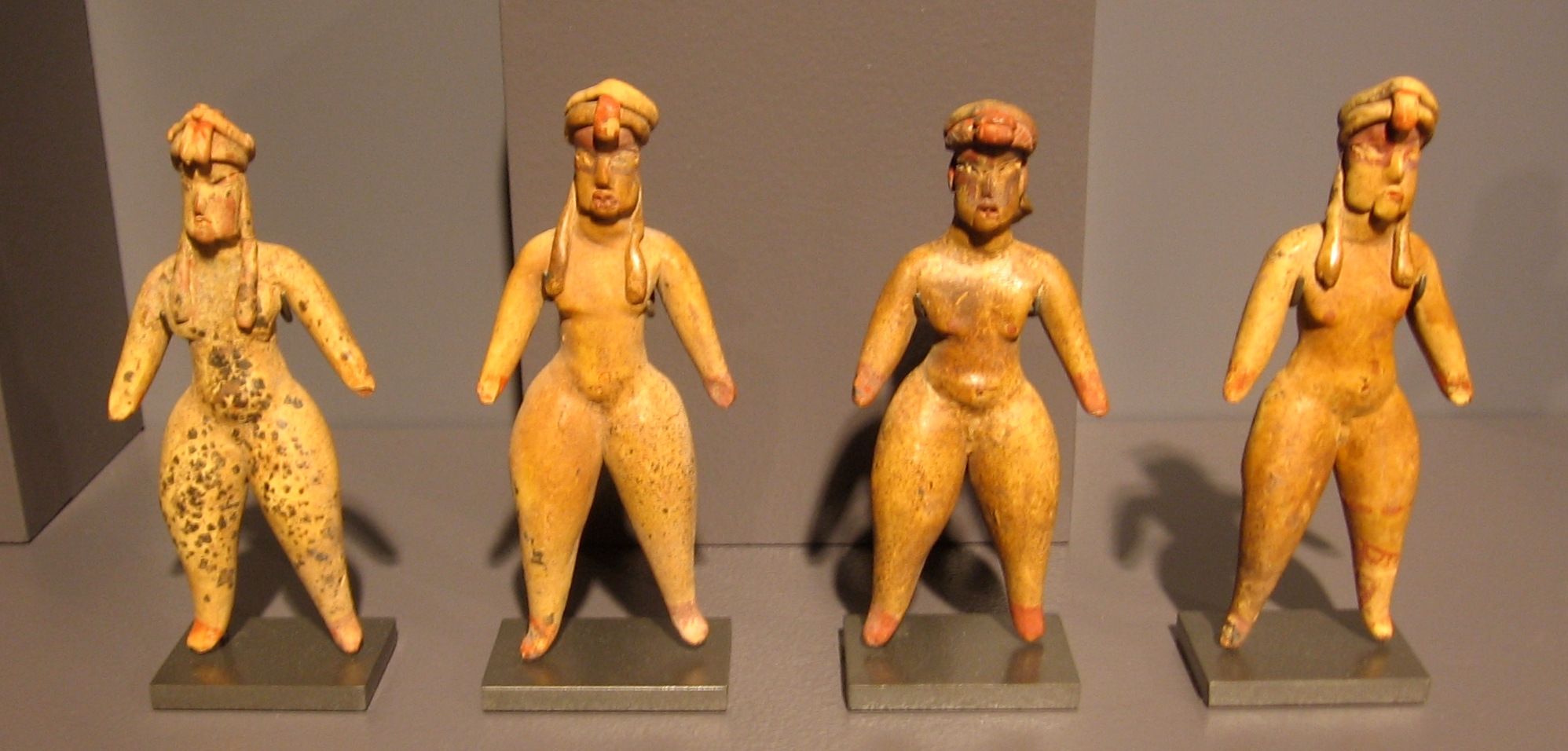
It is very possible that the Otomi ancestors have occupied central Mexico for at least five thousand years, so they would have participated in the development of early Mesoamerican cities. In the image, ceramic figurines related to a fertility cult. From Tlapacoya (Mexico State). Mesoamerican preclassical culture, central Mexico.

The Otomi people (/ˌoʊtəˈmiː/ is a native ethnic group inhabiting the central altiplano of Mexico. The two most populous groups are the Highland or Sierra Otomí living in the mountains of La Huasteca and the Mezquital Otomí, living in the Mezquital Valley in the eastern part of the state of Hidalgo, and in the state of Querétaro. Sierra Otomí usually self identify as Ñuhu or Ñuhmu depending on the dialect they speak, whereas Mezquital Otomi self identify as Hñähñu (pronounced [ʰɲɑ̃ʰɲũ]). Smaller Otomi populations exist in the states of Puebla, Mexico, Tlaxcala, Michoacán and Guanajuato. The Otomi language belonging to the Oto-Pamean branch of the Oto-Manguean language family is spoken in many different varieties some of which are not mutually intelligible.

One of the early complex cultures of Mesoamerica, the Otomi were likely the original inhabitants of the central Mexican highlands before the arrival of Nahuatl speakers around ca. 1000 AD, but were gradually replaced and marginalized by Nahua peoples. In the colonial period Otomi speakers helped the Spanish conquistadors as mercenaries and allies, which allowed them to extend into territories that had previously been inhabited by semi-nomadic Chichimecs, for example Querétaro and Guanajuato.

Hence the names used by the otomíes to refer to themselves are numerous: ñätho (Toluca Valley), hñähñu (Mezquital Valley), ñäñho (Santiago de Mezquititlán, south of Querétaro) and ñ'yühü (Northern Puebla Sierra), Pahuatlán) are some of the names used by the Otomi to call themselves in their own languages, although it is common when talking in Spanish they use the Nahuatl ethnonym "Otomi".

==== Otomí Demonym origin ====
As with most ethnonyms used to refer to native peoples of Mexico, the "Otomi" term is not native of the referenced people. "Otomi" is a term that derives from the Nahuatl source "otómitl", a word in the language of the ancient Aztecs meaning "who walks with arrows", although authors such as Wigberto Jiménez Moreno have translated it as "bird hunter with arrows" (flechador de pájaros). Also it is plausible that the demonym is derived from the name Oton, a leader of this people in prehispanic times. According to the members of the Otomi people the term, "Otomi" is pejorative, associated with an image derived from colonial and Nahua sources where the Otomi are presented as indolent and lazy. Therefore, for some years now, there has been a resurgence of native names usage, especially in the Mezquital Valley, Querétaro and northwest of the State of Mexico; territories with a high percentage of Otomi ethnic population. On the other hand, in eastern Michoacán, recovery of the native demonym has not had the same effort.

=== Otomi Language ===
Otomi (/ˌoʊtəˈmiː/, Spanish Otomí [otoˈmi]) is an Oto-Manguean language and one of the indigenous languages of Mexico, spoken by approximately 240,000 indigenous Otomi people in the central altiplano region of Mexico. The language is spoken in many different dialects, some of which are not mutually intelligible, therefore it is in effect a dialect continuum. The word Hñähñu [hɲɑ̃hɲṹ] has been proposed as an endonym, but since it represents the usage of a single dialect it has not gained wide currency. Linguists have classified the modern dialects into three dialect areas: the Northwestern dialects spoken in Querétaro, Hidalgo and Guanajuato; the Southwestern dialects spoken in the State of Mexico; and the Eastern dialects spoken in the highlands of Veracruz, Puebla, and eastern Hidalgo and in villages in Tlaxcala and Mexico states.

Like all other Oto-Manguean languages, Otomi is a tonal language and most varieties distinguish three tones. Nouns are marked only for possessor (either by prefixes or by proclitics); plural number is marked by the definite article and by a verb suffix, and some dialects maintain the historically existing dual number marking.

=== Huamango Legends ===
Huamango is a site with interesting legends. Local belief is that the Otomi occupied this settlement much before the Aztec armies conquered it and applied taxes.

A legend tells that the "Apache" (thus named by inhabitants of the place) lived in Huamango, but had to leave, and went to San Miguel, from where they returned every year to dance at the Temple of the site.

Another legend says: "That originally the place was built and inhabited by Tula’s Toltec and later inhabited by Otomi for a long time." After an earthquake, Huamango inhabitants left the site and moved to a place called Dongú, where they formed a new Center. "Later moved into what today is known as Acambay".

Because of this last legend many direct inhabitants of the region, that claim to be descendants of Huamango builders, and take care of the place and of their Otomi customs.

== The Site ==
The ancient city was built on leveled terraces, it was necessary to make important works on the site terrain irregular topography, to level the field and created large terraces for the structures construction, some probably ceremonial. For the city many reinforcement walls were built, from their size, probably were defensive walls of up to 2 meters high in some parts.

During the site occupation, it is probable that the Central Highlands had political and social instability, there were different cultures disputing control of the region and its cities. Huamango, dominated the Acambay Valley and the peripheral region. It is likely that its location was due to defensive needs, and also to control trade and northern trade routes (States of Hidalgo, Michoacán and Querétaro) and also the southern (Valley of Ixtlahuaca - Atlacomulco and Toluca Valley). Tula exerted an important influence on the central plateau in religion, politics and Economics.

=== Political and Trade Center ===
It is thought that Huamango was an important political center with controls on other cities of the region.

Their people kept different type of relations, mainly trade with sites in the Tula hierarchy and some settlements of the Michoacán region.

Because of the large ceramic variety found, and its strategic location, is thought the city might have been an important trade center, of the central plateau with the western regions.

=== Constructions ===
The site covers six hectares, on which the architectural elements were discovered, the area is characterized by its oak forest and the unreliable land for agriculture, this difficulty diminished on the terraces built.

The outline of most platform base is only marked by stones. Elite rooms are presumed to have been built, occupied by Huamango priests and administrators.

Although the land topography was not suitable for construction, the constructors had a remarkable solution to the problem, by the artificial leveling and conditioning of large terraces on which the structures were built using stones and clay mortar and covered with overlaid stone slabs.

Dr. Román Piña Chán arranged the site in two separated architectural systems, in an east-west direction on the plateau, to facilitate research. System A is located in the western side and System B in the eastern side.

=== System A ===
This set includes a two-bodied overlaid structure with stairway on the west side. An altar is located at the front, in the center of a square, which is surrounded by residential house foundations, probably for the ruling class.

=== System B ===
It consists of a temple basement with three overlaid bodies, stairway with sloped wall (alfarda). In front of the structure is a small altar, with several residential structures surrounding it. Some of the monuments were coated with small imbricated stone slabs (overlaid as a roof tiles), a characteristic practice of the Otomi architecture. Archaeological investigations have shown that temples and rooms were roofed with a wooden beam structure, covered with a thick clay sealing layer. All buildings had stucco floors and stone furnaces, probably used for cooking, burning incense or as room heating stoves.

== Structures ==
The ceremonial center covers 300 m (north-south) and 200 m (east-west). Released buildings are as follows:

=== The Palace ===
The Palace is located almost at the site center. The ceremonial building preserves the architectural style of the place, recessed stairways and stuccoed stone. It was identified as a palace, because at the top were found wooden pilaster elements at the entrance, as well as stone foundations and smokers, these depict religious activity.

It has two bodies, covered with a wall of stone slabs and a central stairway case to the west. On the north and eastern sides is a 30 cm wide walkway. Atop the structure are indications of a temple-room, with a hallway in front and three entrance spaces, separated by two wooden pillars, as access to the aforementioned ample space, which had two furnaces or tlecuiles. The presence inside of Sahumerios (Smokers) is an indication of the religious purposes of the place.

This building is a pyramid, roofs were made of perishable materials, such as adobe, dirt, tile and palm leaves, so could not be preserved over time.

=== Altar ===
Located west of the Palace. Possibly had a single body, although there is evidence of two stairs towards the east and west; the altar was coated with imbricated stone slabs. It is not known if the altars were related to any specific religious ceremony. It is possible they were associated with sacrifice rituals.

=== Warrior Temple ===
It has three staggered bodies, it is the foundation over which a religious temple was probably built. At the front should have been a stairway, probably with sloped walls, for access to the top. It was identified as a temple because of its shape, height, associated ceramics, calcined burials deposited inside of ceramic vessels and the continued use for religious activities.

Currently serves as a cross base; stones removed from the structure were used to construct the adjoining Catholic chapel. Very near this construction a headstone with a warrior depiction was found.

=== Residential area ===
The lower elevation platforms set corresponds to a residential housing sector, possibly for government elite; most of the population lived dispersed around the contour of the ceremonial center. Incense smokers found inside the housing platforms indicates domestic religious activities.

=== Housing platforms ===
A residential complex consisting of rooms around small patios was built on this set of platforms. Elements found in the interior of the rooms include pots, a spoon fragment, blades, scrapers and a furnace, used in domestic activities, depicting some aspects of the life of the inhabitants of this site.

== Burials ==
Burials were found and excavated at the site, yielded ceramic offering vessels in a distinctive polychrome style.

== Symbolic Stone ==
The Acambay "Casa de la Cultura" holds an interesting stone, possibly was made by the Aztecs, on one of its sides has a figure representing Huitzilopochtli, on the other side has sharp and precise images that were probably made with iron tools during the colonial era. To see the stone, permission is required from the House of culture.

== Bibliography ==
- Folan, William (1979) San Miguel de Huamango: un centro tolteca-otomí. Boletín de la Escuela de Ciencias Antropológicas de la Universidad de Yucatán 6(32):36-40.
- Folan, William J. (1989) More on a Functional Interpretation of the Scraper Plane. Journal of Field Archaeology 16:486-489.
- Folan, William J. (1990) Huamango, estado de México: un eslabón en la relación norte-sur de la gran Mesoamérica. In Mesoamérica y norte de México, siglos IX-XII, edited by Federica Sodi Miranda, pp. 337–362. vol. 1. 2 vols. Instituto Nacional de Antropología e Historia, Mexico City.
- Folan, William J., Lynda Florey Folan and Antonio Ruiz Pérez (1987) La iconografía de Huamango, municipio de Acabay, Estado de México: Un centro regional otomí de los siglos IX al XIII. In Homenaje a Román Piña Chán, edited by Barbro Dahlgren, Carlos Navarrete, Lorenzo Ochoa, Mari Carmen Serra Puche and Yoko Sugiura Yamamoto, pp. 411–453. Instituto de Investigaciones Antropológicas, Universidad Nacional Autónoma de México, Mexico City.
- Granados Reyes, Paz and Miguel Guevara (1999) El complejo Huamango y su área de interacción. Paper presented at the III Coloquio Internacional Otopames, Toluca.
- Lagunas Rodríguez, Zaid (1997) Costumbres funerarias y características bioculturales de la población prehispánica de Huamango. Expresión Antropológica (Instituto Mexiquense de Cultura) 6:7-28.
- Piña Chán, Román (1981) Investigaciones sobre Huamango y región vecina (Memoria del Proyecto). 2 vols. Dirección de Turiso del Gobierno del Estado de México, Toluca.
