= Jesús Alcántara Núñez =

Mexican politician

- Born: 21 June 1965 (age 60); Acambay, State of Mexico, Mexico
- Occupation: Politician
- Political party: PRI

Jesús Sergio Alcántara Núñez (born 21 June 1965) is a Mexican politician affiliated with the Institutional Revolutionary Party (PRI). In the 2006 general election he was elected to the Chamber of Deputies to represent the State of Mexico's first district during the 60th session of Congress.
