= Cotztetlana villadai =

Scientific classification
- Kingdom: Animalia
- Phylum: Arthropoda
- Subphylum: Chelicerata
- Class: Arachnida
- Order: Araneae
- Infraorder: Mygalomorphae
- Family: Theraphosidae
- Genus: Cotztetlana
- Species: C. villadai

Binomial name
- Cotztetlana villadai Estrada-Alvarez, 2014

Species of tarantula

Cotztetlana villadai is a tarantula species in the Cotztetlana genus. It was first described by Julio C. Estrada-Alvarez in 2014. It is found in State of Mexico in Mexico. This spider is named after Manuel María Villada Peimbert, a Mexican naturalist and founder of a natural history museum that now bears his name.

== Characteristics ==
This tarantula is distinguished from Cotztetlana omiltemi because of the spermatheca, the receptors having converging borders. Its coloration is completely dark brown, with legs of brownish orange hairs, in the majority of the legs, its opisthosoma is darker, with brownish orange hairs.

== Habitat ==
This species is found in the State of Mexico, Temascalcingo. The majority of this territory is around 2,600 m above sea level, the average temperature being 15.4°C, the annual rainfall being around 874.6 mm. In this regions pines, oaks and cedars are common trees, common plants being agave, chayote and huizache.
