= Miguel Sámano Peralta =

Mexican politician

- Born: 23 May 1966 (age 60); Acambay, State of Mexico, Mexico
- Occupation: Politician
- Political party: PRI
- Website: http://www.miguelsamano.org.mx/

Miguel Sámano Peralta (born 23 May 1966) is a Mexican politician affiliated with the Institutional Revolutionary Party (PRI).

He has represented the State of Mexico's first district on two occasions: in 2012–2015 during the 62nd Congress, and in 2021–2024 during the 65th Congress.

He previously served in the LVII Legislature of the Congress of the State of Mexico.
