= José Antonio Saavedra Coronel =

Mexican politician

- Born: 1 October 1963 (age 62); State of Mexico, Mexico
- Occupation: Politician
- Political party: PRD

José Antonio Saavedra Coronel (born 1 October 1963) is a Mexican politician affiliated with the Party of the Democratic Revolution (PRD). In the 2006 general election he was elected to the Chamber of Deputies to represent the State of Mexico's fifth district during the 60th session of Congress.
