= Hermilo Monroy Pérez =

Mexican politician (1931–2016)

- Born: 13 December 1931; Atlacomulco, State of Mexico, Mexico
- Died: 29 July 2016 (aged 84)
- Occupations: Politician. Presidente Municipal de Atlacomulco, Estado de México en 2 períodos: de 1973 a 1975 y de 1991 a 1993.
- Political party: PRI

Hermilo Monroy Pérez (13 December 1931 – 29 July 2016) was a Mexican politician from the Institutional Revolutionary Party (PRI). From 2000 to 2003 he served in the Chamber of Deputies during the 58th session of Congress representing the State of Mexico's first district. Monroy Pérez died on 29 July 2016, at the age of 84.
