= Héctor Velasco Monroy =

Mexican politician

- Born: 12 September 1969 (age 56); State of Mexico, Mexico
- Occupation: Politician
- Political party: PRI

Héctor Eduardo Velasco Monroy (born 12 September 1969) is a Mexican politician from the Institutional Revolutionary Party (PRI). From 2009 to 2012 he served in the Chamber of Deputies during the 61st session of Congress representing the State of Mexico's first district.
