= Felipe Borja =

Mexican politician

- Born: 23 August 1955 (age 70); Axapusco, State of Mexico, Mexico
- Occupation: Politician
- Political party: PRI

Felipe Borja Texocotitla (born 23 August 1955) is a Mexican politician from the Institutional Revolutionary Party (PRI). In the 2009 mid-terms he was elected to the Chamber of Deputies to represent the State of Mexico's fifth district during the 61st session of Congress.
