= Darío Zacarías Capuchino =

Mexican politician

- Born: 14 August 1971 (age 54); Acolman, State of Mexico, Mexico
- Occupation: Politician
- Political party: PRI

Darío Zacarías Capuchino (born 14 August 1971) is a Mexican politician affiliated with the Institutional Revolutionary Party (PRI). In the 2012 general election he was elected to the Chamber of Deputies to represent the State of Mexico's fifth district during the 62nd session of Congress.
