= 1955 Mexican legislative election =

Legislative elections were held in Mexico on 4 July 1955. They were first federal elections in which women were able to vote after President Adolfo Ruiz Cortines introduced unrestricted citizenship for women on 17 October 1953, meeting one of his main campaign promises. As a result, the electorate increased from around five million in 1952 to nine million in 1955.

The Institutional Revolutionary Party won 153 of the 162 seats in the Chamber of Deputies. The National Action Party (PAN) won six, the Popular Party (PP) won two, and one seat was won by the Nationalist Party of Mexico (PNM).

The opposition deputies were elected in the following districts:

- PAN: Chihuahua's 3rd, the Federal District's 3rd, the Federal District's 9th, the Federal District's 17th, Morelos's 1st and Oaxaca's 6th.
- PP: Durango's 3rd and the State of Mexico's 3rd.
- PNM: the State of Mexico's 1st.

== Results ==
Party	Votes	%	Seats	+/–
Institutional Revolutionary Party (PRI)	5,562,761	89.86	153	+2
National Action Party (PAN)	567,678	9.17	6	+1
Popular Party (PP)	42,621	0.69	2	0
Nationalist Party of Mexico (PNM)	17,316	0.28	1	0
Total	6,190,376	100.00	162	+1
Registered voters/turnout	8,941,020	–		
Source: Nohlen, Chamber of Deputies
