= Cotztetlana =

Scientific classification
- Kingdom: Animalia
- Phylum: Arthropoda
- Subphylum: Chelicerata
- Class: Arachnida
- Order: Araneae
- Infraorder: Mygalomorphae
- Family: Theraphosidae
- Genus: Cotztetlana; Mendoza, 2012

Type species
- C. omiltemi Mendoza, 2012

Species
- C. omiltemi Mendoza, 2012 – Mexico; C. villadai Estrada-Alvarez, 2014 – Mexico

Genus of spiders

Cotztetlana is a genus of Mexican tarantulas that was first described by J. I. Mendoza M. in 2012. As of March 2020 it contains two species, found in Mexico: C. omiltemi and C. villadai.
