= Nationalist Party of Mexico =

Mexican political party, 1951–1962

- Leader: Salvador Rivero y Martínez
- Founded: 4 June 1951
- Dissolved: 30 March 1964
- Slogan: Land, Homeland, Liberty

The Nationalist Party of Mexico (Spanish: Partido Nacionalista de México, also known as the Partido Nacionalista Mexicano, PNM) is a defunct political party of Mexico. It obtained formal registration as a national party on 4 June 1951 after operating, since 1934, as a political grouping of various Roman Catholic organizations under the names Partido Social Cristiano, Partido Social Demócrata Cristiano, Movimiento Unificador Nacionalista Sindical and Movimiento Unificador Nacionalista.

The driving force behind the party during its existence was the Mexico City lawyer Salvador Rivero y Martínez.

Its registration was cancelled by the Secretariat of the Interior (SEGOB) on 30 March 1964 – two days before the start of candidate registrations for the 1964 elections – after a period of confused infighting between three factions that claimed control over the party.

== Electoral history ==
In the 1952 presidential election the PNM supported the ultimate winner, Adolfo Ruiz Cortines of the Institutional Revolutionary Party (PRI). In the legislative election held on the same day, the party won two seats in the Chamber of Deputies: for Mexico City's 14th district and for Hidalgo's 5th.

In the 1955 mid-term election, the PNM's sole victory was in the State of Mexico's 1st district.

The PNM again backed the PRI's candidate and ultimate victor, Adolfo López Mateos, in the 1958 general election. Despite running in 51 congressional districts and contending in nine Senate races in that election, the party failed to win any seats in Congress.

In the 1961 mid-term election it secured 0.27% of the popular vote for deputies and no seats.
