= Jilotepec de Abasolo =

City in the State of Mexico, Mexico

Jilotepec de Molina Enríquez
- City

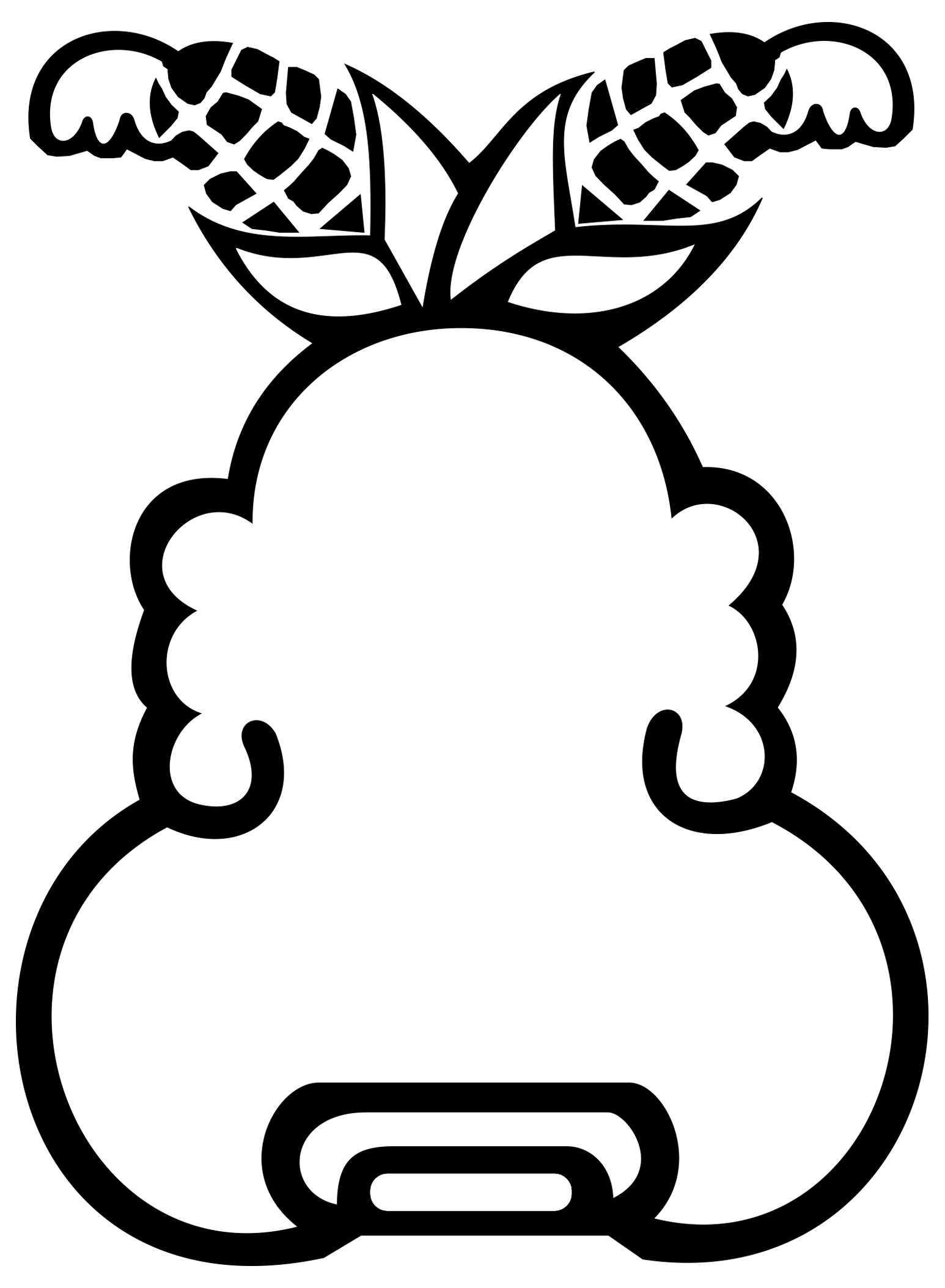
- Coat of arms

- Location within Mexico
- Coordinates: 19°57′07″N 99°31′58″W
- Country: Mexico
- State: State of Mexico
- Municipality: Jilotepec
- City: Jilotepec de Molina Enríquez
- Founded: about 1561
- Municipality Established: March 11, 1824
- Colonias: Colonias: Centro; El Deni; La Luz; La Cruz de Dendho; La Merced; Xhisda; Javier Barrios

Government
  - Municipal President: Rodolfo Nogués Barajas (PRI)

Area
  - City: 588.73 km^{2} (227.31 sq mi)
  - Water: 12.165 km^{2} (4.697 sq mi)
  - Urban: 26.74 km^{2} (10.32 sq mi)
- Elevation (of seat): 2,452 m (8,045 ft)

Population (2018) Municipality
  - City: 100,808
  - Density: 171.23/km^{2} (443.5/sq mi)
  - Seat: 10,513
- Demonym: Jilotepequense
- Time zone: UTC-6 (Central)
- Postal code (of seat): 54240
- Area code: 761
- Website: (in Spanish) http://www.jilotepec-edomex.gob.mx/

Jilotepec de Molina Enríquez, known as Jilotepec de Abasolo until 1986, and commonly known as Jilotepec (Otomian languages: Madönxi), is a city located in the northwest zone of the State of Mexico in Mexico. The name comes from Náhuatl, meaning "hill of corncobs". It is the municipal seat and largest city of the municipality of Jilotepec (not Jilotepec de Molina Enríquez). It is located in hilly and forested terrain about an hour's drive from Mexico City and the state capital of Toluca, 40 minutes from San Juan del Río, 30 minutes from Tula and 20 minutes from Tepeji. The Mexico City–Querétaro highway and the new Transoceanic Freeways that unite the coasts of Mexico from Veracruz to Michoacán converge within its territory.

The municipality of Jilotepec is located 1670 meters above sea level and covers an area of 586.53 km^{2}, being the fourth-largest municipality in the State of Mexico. According to INEGI data, Jilotepec de Abasolo has a population of 71,624. The municipality borders the municipalities of Polotitlan, Aculco, Timilpan, Chapa de Mota, Villa del Carbón, Soyaniquilpan and the state of Hidalgo. At the end of the 18th century, Jilotepec was part of the municipality of Huichapan, in the District of Tula. On March 11, 1824, Jilotepec de Abasolo was created from parts of Huichapan Chapa de Mota, Villa del Carbón, and Acambay.

In 2023, Jilotepec was designated a Pueblo Mágico by the Mexican government, recognizing its cultural and historical importance.

== The town of Jilotepec de Molina Enríquez ==
The city had a population of 10,503 as of 2005.

The region was originally inhabited by Otomis then conquered in 1379 by Acamapichtli the Aztec tlatoani (chief), later during the Viceroyalty of New Spain and the porfirian era, Jilotepec received waves of mostly Spanish and French settlers. After the Spanish Conquest, Jilotepec was recorded in ecclesiastical records as a village with a single priest, administrated by the Franciscans with the Brothers Alonso de Rangel and Antonio de Ciudad Rodrigo being the first to evangelize the area. Sometime in the middle of the 16th century, silver was discovered in Zacatecas and Guanajuato, leading to the construction of the Camino Real a Zacatecas (Royal Road to Zacatecas) with passed through>

== Geography ==
Jilotepec lies in the north of the state of Mexico. To its north is the state of Hidalgo, to the south are the municipalities of Chapa de Mota and Timilpan, to the southeast is Villa del Carbón, to the east is Soyanilquilpan, and to the west are Polotitlán and Aculco.

=== Political Geography ===
There is one city in the municipality of Jilotepec, the municipal head Jilotepec de Molina Enríquez which is divided into six neighborhoods, or colonias: Colonia Centro, Javier Barrios, La Merced, El Deni, La Cruz de Dendho, and Xhisda.

There is only one village, or villa, the Villa de Canalejas

There are 23 towns, or pueblos:

Name	Population (2010)
Acazuchitlán	3,037
Agua Escondida	2,467
Aldama	2,005
Buenavista	2,151
Calpulalpan	3,800
Coscomate del Progreso	1,547
Dexcaní Alto	1,101
Dexcaní Bajo	1,426
Doxhichó	1,992
El Rosal	1,234
Ejido San Lorenzo Octeyuco	2,659
Las Huertas	3,931
San Lorenzo Nenamicoyan	2,008
San Lorenzo Octeyuco	685
San Martín Tuchicuitlapilco	1,942
San Miguel de la Victoria	3,238
San Pablo Huantepec	3,996
Santiago Oxthoc	1,124
Xhimohay	2,503
Xhixhata	2,195
El Saltillo	765
Las Manzanas	2,803
La Comunidad	2,589

There are 24 small towns, or rancherías:

Name	Population (2010)
Emiliano Zapata	154
Danxho	1,096
Dedeni Dolores	291
Denjhi	1,238
El Durazno de Cuauhtémoc	1,014
El Durazno de Guerrero	119
El Magueyal	1,236
El Majuay	136
El Rincón	691
El Xhitey	1,189
Ejido de Coscomate	1,452
Ejido de Jilotepec	801
La Huaracha	no data
La Maqueda	452
Llano Grande	311
Magueycitos	548
Mataxhi	253
Mexicaltongo	no data
Octeyuco 2000	1,158
Ojo de Agua	1,221
San Ignacio de Loyola	118
Santa Martha de la Cruz	250
Tecolapan	928
Teupan	895

=== Physical Geography ===
The primary geographical features of the region are fertile plains interrupted by hills and canyons. The municipality sits at the northern edge of the Trans-Mexican Volcanic Belt physiographic region on the Sierra Nevada mountain range. The municipality is further divided by the subregions of the plains and mountains of Querétaro and Hidalgo to the north, and the lakes and volcanoes of Anáhuac comprising a small part of the municipality to the south. It is the fifth largest municipality in the state of Mexico.

=== Geology ===
The geological substrate of the municipality is primarily extrusive igneous rock, that is, volcanic in origin. These rocks are notable for the presence of basaltic lava flows, deposits of basaltic ash, slag, and pyroclastic rocks. Many of the older buildings in Jilotepec were built using these basaltic rocks.

The soil is mostly luvisolic, comprises 75% of the municipality's soil, and is particularly suited to agricultural industry though susceptible to erosion. About 15% of the soil is vertisolic and is located in the east of the municipality. This soil is prone to contraction in the dry season and is suited for grasses and grazing.

The primary mineral resource of the region is kaolin, a white clay that is useful in porcelain and medicine making. Other minerals that can be found in the municipality include chalcedony and tezontle.

=== Hydrology ===
Jilotepec is in the Alto Pánuco hydrologic region of the state of Mexico in the San Juan river basin. The most notable river in the municipality is the Coscomate which feeds into the Danxho reservoir and numerous streams such as Los Charcos, El Colorado, Dedeni, La Mina and 40 others. The Huapango reservoir is the municipality's largest at 120 million m^{3}, followed by the Danxho with 31 million m^{3}, and the Santa Elena with 5 million m^{3}. In addition to other smaller streams and reservoirs the municipality is supplied with water by the San Pablo Huantepec spring which flows at 10 L/s.

The municipality has a good supply of underground water thanks to the high permeability of the soil in most of the region. The quality of the water is "acceptable" though it is contaminated with waste and untreated water, especially in the municipal head where the Coscomate River and Colorado Stream flow.

=== Fauna ===
Jilotepec has not done an exhaustive survey of the wildlife within its municipal borders but they do have an informal registry of species. There is a diversity of frogs, lizards, and snakes (only three of which are venomous) in Jilotepec. The birds of the region concentrate around the forests and lakes and represent the greatest diversity of wildlife in the municipality. The mammals of the region include common herbivores and carnivores such as weasels, coyotes, squirrels, and possums.

==== Fish ====
Only the charal is common to the region. It is commonly fished for food and typically dried. The charal has a wide tolerance for changes in weather common to the municipality throughout the year. Though it is easily found and commonly consumed, there is no industry actively exploiting the charal population in Jilotepec. Though not native to the region, carp (Cyprinus carpio) and largemouth bass (Micropterus salmoides) are commercially farmed, recently being introduced to the Huapango reservoir.

==== Amphibian Species ====
Common name (English)	Common name (Spanish)	Scientific name	Image
Plateau Toad	Sapo de la Meseta	Anaxyrus compactilis	
Canyon Tree Frog	Ranita de las Rocas	Hyla arenicolor	
Ridged Tree Frog	Rana de Árbol Plegada	Hyla plicata	
American Bullfrog	Rana Toro	Lithobates castesbeianus	
Forrer's Grass Frog	Rana Pinta	Lithobates forreri	
Montezuma Leopard Frog	Rana Montezuma	Lithobates montezumae	
Mexican Tiger Salamander	Ajolote del Altiplano	Ambystoma velasci	
Bell's Salamander	Tlaconete Pinto	Isthmura bellii	

==== Reptile Species ====
Common name (English)	Common name (Spanish)	Scientific name	Image
Transvolcanic Alligator Lizard	Lagarto Alicante del Popocatépetl	Barisia imbricata	
Mexican Plateau Horned Lizard	Camaleón de Montaña	Phrynosoma orbiculare	
Mesquite Lizard	Lagartija Espinosa del Mezquite	Sceloporus grammicus	
Eastern Spiny Lizard	Lagartija Espinosa Mexicana	Sceloporus spinosus	
Torquate Lizard	Lagartija Espinosa de Collar	Sceloporus torquatus	
Duges' Spiny Lizard	Espinosa de Dugés del Este	Sceloporus dugesii	
Largenose Earth Snake	Culebra Gris Nariz de Pala	Conopsis nasus	
Mexican Kingsnake	Serpiente Real Mexicana	Lampropeltis mexicana	
Bocourt's Black-headed Snake	Culebrita Cabeza Negra de Bocourt	Tantilla bocourti	
Neotropical Whip Snake	Culebra Chirrionera Neotropical	Coluber mentovarius	
Mexican Bull Snake	Alicante	Pituophis deppei	
Baird's Patchnose Snake	Culebra Chata Mexicana	Salvadora bairdi	
Mexican Garter Snake	Culebra de Agua Nómada Mexicana	Thamnophis eques	
Blackbelly Garter Snake	Culebra de Agua de Panza Negra	Thamnophis melanogaster	
Longtail Alpine Garter Snake	Culebra Listonada de Montaña Cola Larga	Thamnophis scalaris	
Queretaran Dusky Rattlesnake	Cascabel Obscura de Querétaro	Crotalus aquilus	
Western Dusky Rattlesnake	Cascabel Transvolcánica	Crotalus triseriatus	
Black Tailed Rattlesnake	Cascabel de Cola Negra	Crotalus molossus	

==== Bird Species ====
Common name (English)	Common name (Spanish)	Scientific name	Image
Mexican Duck	Pato Mexicano	Anas platyrhynchos diazi	
Northern Bobwhite	Cordorniz Cotuí Norteña	Colinus virginianus	
Pied-billed Grebe	Zampullín de Pico Grueso	Podilymbus podiceps	
Brown Pelican	Pelícano Pardo	Pelecanus occidentalis	
Anhinga	Aninga Americana	Anhinga anhinga	
Western Cattle Egret	Garza Ganadera	Bubulcus ibis	
Turkey Vulture	Buitre Pavo	Cathartes aura	
Cooper's Hawk	Gavilán de Cooper	Accipiter cooperii	
Harris's Hawk	Aguilla de Harris	Parabuteo unicinctus	
American Kestrel	Cernícal Americano	Falco sparverius	
Killdeer	Chorlo Gritón	Charadrius vociferus	
Mexican Dove	Tortolita Mexicana	Columbina inca	
Eastern Whippoorwill	Chotacabras	Caprimulgus vociferus	
Acorn Woodpecker	Carpintero Bellotero	Melanerpes formicivorus	
Broad-tailed Hummingbird	Colibrí Coliancho	Selasphorus platycerus	
Loggerhead Shrike	Alcaudón Americano	Lanius ludovicianus	
Common Raven	Cuervo Grande	Corvus corax	
Barn Swallow	Golondrina común	Hirundo rustica	
Brown-backed Solitaire	Clarín Jilguero	Myadestes occidentalis	
Northern Mockingbird	Cenzontle Común	Mimus polyglottos	
Ocellated Thrasher	Cuitlacoche Manchado	Toxostoma ocellatum	
Common Starling	Estornino Pinto	Sturnus vulgaris	
Clay-colored Sparrow	Gorrión Pálido	Spizella pallida	
House Finch	Pinzón Mexicano	Carpodacus mexicanus	
Black-headed Grosbeak	Picogordo Tigrillo	Pheucticus melanocephalus	
Great-tailed Grackle	Zanate Mexicano	Quiscalus mexicanus	

==== Mammal Species ====
Common name (English)	Common name (Spanish)	Scientific name	Image
Virginia Opossum	Tlacuache	Didelphis virginiana californica	
Nine-banded Armadillo	Armadillo de Nueve Bandas	Dasypus novemcinctus mexicanus	
Eastern Cottontail	Conejo de Monte	Sylvilagus floridanus connectens	
Coyote	Coyote	Canis latrans cagottis	
Gray Fox	Zorro Gris	Urocyon cinereoargenteus nigrirostris	
Mexican Bobcat	Lince Rojo	Lynx rufus escuinapae	
Long-tailed Weasel	Comadreja de Cola Larga	Mustela frenata frenata	
American Hog-nosed Skunk	Zorrillo Cadeno	Conepatus leuconotus leuconotus	
Ring-tailed Cat	Cacomixtle Norteño	Bassariscus astutus astutus	
Southern Flying Squirrel	Ardilla Voladora	Glaucomys volans goldmani	
Rock Squirrel	Ardillón de Roca	Otospermophilus variegatus variegatus	
Mexican Gray Squirrel	Ardilla Gris Mexicana	Sciurus aureogaster nigrescens	
Wood mouse	Ratón de Campo	Apodemus sylvaticus	
Ghost-faced Bat	Murciélago Rostro de Fantasma	Mormoops megalophylla	

=== Flora ===
Jilotepec's vegetation is predominantly semiarid grassland. In the north, the oak forests of Las Peñas are the largest in the state of Mexico. Throughout the municipality maguey, nopal, and tejocote are common, as well as many plants used in traditional medicinal recipes. There are two protected areas in Jilotepec: the state park El Llano Canalejas and the municipal park Las Sequoias as well as many smaller local parks and forests.

=== Climate ===
The climate of Jilotepec varies between Cwa and Cwb on the Köppen climate classification, meaning it's in a temperate zone with dry winters and warm to hot summers. The southern portion of the region is noticeably cooler than the northern region which is closer to the warmer region of the Bajío. Likewise, rain is more intense in the south of the state than in the north.

Monthly Climate Data
	Jan.	Feb.	March	April	May	June	July	Aug.	Sept.	Oct.	Nov.	Dec.
Avg. Temp. (°C)	11.6	13.1	15.4	16.9	17.7	17.1	16.3	16.4	15.7	14.3	13.0	12.1
Avg. High Temp. (°C)	20.0	21.0	23.5	24.3	24.5	22.6	22.0	21.7	21.0	21.0	20.3	20.0
Avg. Low Temp. (°C)	3.2	4.3	6.5	8.0	10.0	11.0	11.0	11.0	10.6	8.5	5.0	3.5
Chance of Rain (%)	5.8	4.7	4.5	11.8	25.5	56.3	67.8	65.3	56.0	28.0	8.7	2.7
Avg. Rainfall (mm)	6.2	7.0	7.0	12.3	34.0	84. 0	104.7	96.3	87.3	41.3	11.3	3.7

== Economy ==
6,416 hectares of the municipality is dedicated to the production of corn (the major crop), beans, wheat and livestock which is very important activity in the economic life of Jilotepec. Livestock includes cows pigs, sheep, and deer being a major dairy and meat producer. There are also farms with 8.5 millions birds for the production of meat and eggs. The raising of freshwater fish is a growing industry in the municipality as well.

The municipality has two types of industry, the first being family workshops which produce clothes, ceramics and pottery. The second are factories focused on the production and embroidery of clothes for men and the manufacturing of plastic containers and other wool products. Its largest employer is the tool manufacturing company Truper.
