= Jilotepec, State of Mexico =

Jilotepec
- Municipality

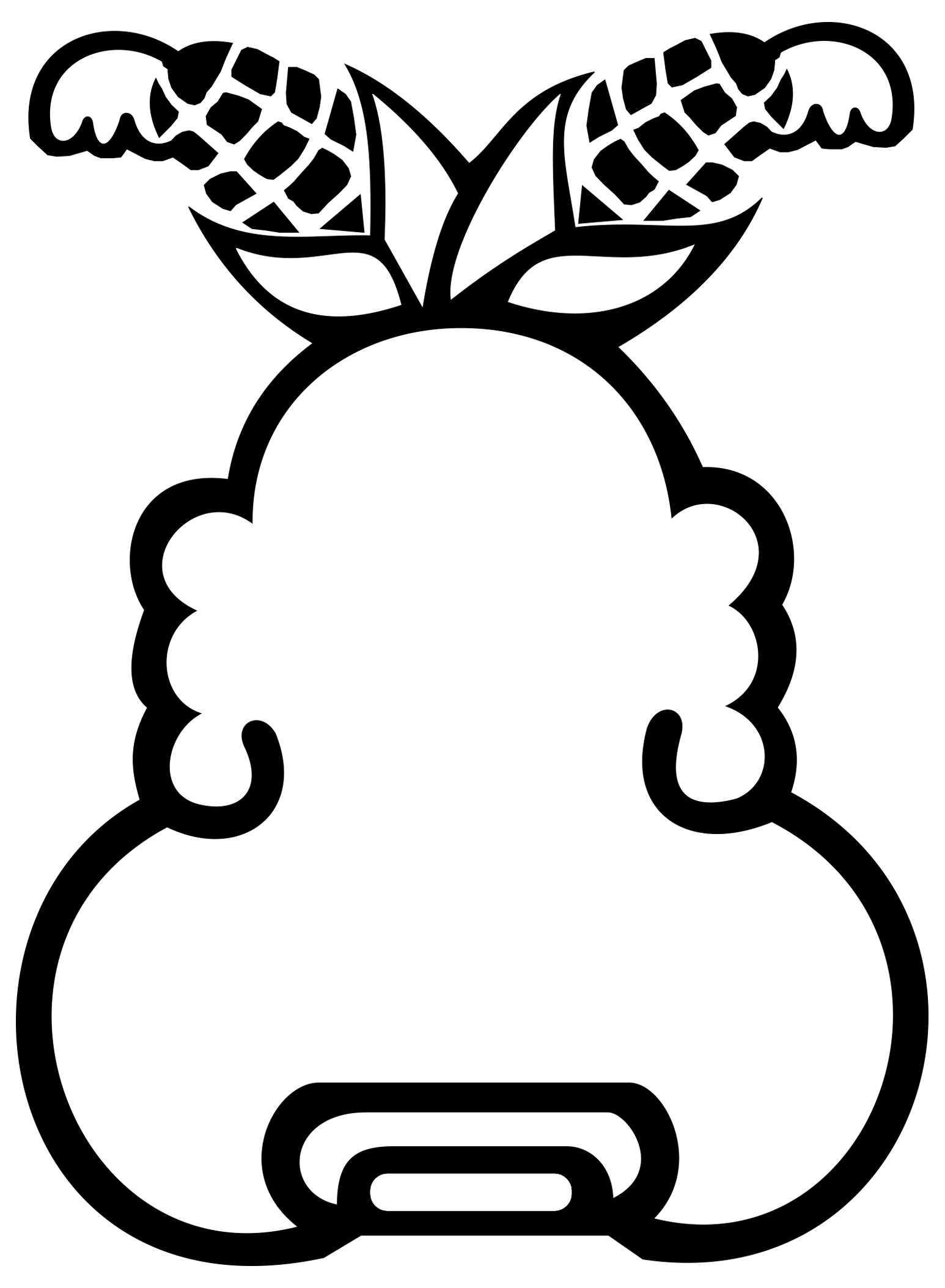
- Seal

- Location within Mexico
- Coordinates: 19°57′07″N 99°31′58″W
- Country: Mexico
- State: State of Mexico
- Municipality: Jilotepec
- Municipal Seat: Jilotepec de Molina Enríquez
- Municipality Established: March 11, 1824
- Colonias: Colonias: Centro; El Deni; La Luz; La Cruz de Dendho; La Merced; Xhisda; Javier Barrios

Government
  - Municipal President: Agustín Bonilla Rodríguez (2019-2021) (MORENA)

Area
  - Municipality: 588.73 km^{2} (227.31 sq mi)
  - Water: 12.165 km^{2} (4.697 sq mi)
  - Urban: 26.74 km^{2} (10.32 sq mi)
- Elevation (of seat): 2,452 m (8,045 ft)

Population (2018) Municipality
  - Municipality: 87,671
  - Density: 171.23/km^{2} (443.5/sq mi)
  - Seat: 10,513
- Demonym: Jilotepequense
- Time zone: UTC-6 (Central (US Central))
  - Summer (DST): UTC-5 (Central)
- Postal code (of seat): 54240
- Area code: 761
- Website: (in Spanish) http://www.jilotepec-edomex.gob.mx/

Jilotepec is one of 125 municipalities in the State of Mexico. The municipal seat is the city of Jilotepec de Molina Enríquez. As of 2020, it has a population of 87,671.
