= Polotitlán de la Ilustración =

Municipality of Polotitlan
- Location within Mexico
- Coordinates: 20°13′23″N 99°48′53″W
- Country: Mexico
- State: State of Mexico
- Founded: 1852
- Municipal Status: 1875

Government
  - Municipal President: Teresita Sánchez Bárcena (2021-2024)
- Elevation: 2,300 m (7,500 ft)

Population (2005)Municipality
  - Total: 12,319
  - Seat: 2,819
- Time zone: UTC-6 (Central)
- Postal code: 54200

Polotitlán de la Ilustración is the name of the municipal seat of the municipality of Polotitlán, which is located in the State of Mexico, in Mexico. It is located in the northwestern part of the state, bordering the state of Hidalgo. It is 125 km north of Toluca, the state capital, and 121 km north-northwest of Mexico City. "Polotitlán" is made up of the Spanish surname Polo and the Nahuatl suffix titlán. The name means "Place of the Polos", in memory of the family that fought in the Mexican War of Independence.

== The town ==
Because of the lack of water supplies and the cold, this area was not permanently settled prior to the arrival of the Spanish. For similar reasons, this area was distributed among the Spaniards late, in the latter half of the 16th century. Only around the beginning of the 18th century is there evidence of permanent communities here, as the ranches managed little by little to transform the topography with irrigation techniques. What is now the town began as a ranch called "El Ventorrillo", "la Soledad", "San Antonio del Río" as well as the later "San Antonio Polotitlán" and belonged to the municipality of San Jerónimo Aculco in the 17th century. The first Polo, Juan Luis Polo, came here in 1774. However, the family members who made themselves notable in the War of Independence were Col. José Rafael Polo, with his brothers José Trinidad y Manuel for their actions in the districts of Jilotepec de Abasolo, Huichapan and Tula. A chapel was built here in 1847 and Polotitlán was recognized as a town in 1852. In 1878, the current name of Polotitlán de la Ilustración was adopted after General Porfirio Díaz called it this when he visited in 1876.

The total population of the town in 2005 was 2,819.

The most notable construction in the town is a "Porfirian-style" bandstand crowned with a clocktower that faces the 4 directions. It also serves as a monument to José Rafael Polo.

== The municipality ==
The limits of Polotitlán are the following ones, to the north with the states of Hidalgo and Querétaro, to the south with Aculco, the east with the states of Hidalgo and Jilotepec and the west with Aculco and the state of Querétaro. The municipality was established in 1875.

The municipality of Polotitlán occupies a territorial extension of 132.8 km^{2}, which represents 0.6% of the total surface of the organization.

The total population of the municipality as of 2005 was 12,319.

Agriculture most land that can be used for agriculture is, usually for seasonal crops like corn or vegetables and most of this needs to be irrigated. Because of the harsh conditions of the area, 409.137 hectares are classified as "without vegetation". While there is some pastureland, there is not enough to support commercial livestock-raising. There are also some small industries and family workshops making clothing, candles, cushions, and concrete.
