= Temascalcingo =

- Municipality
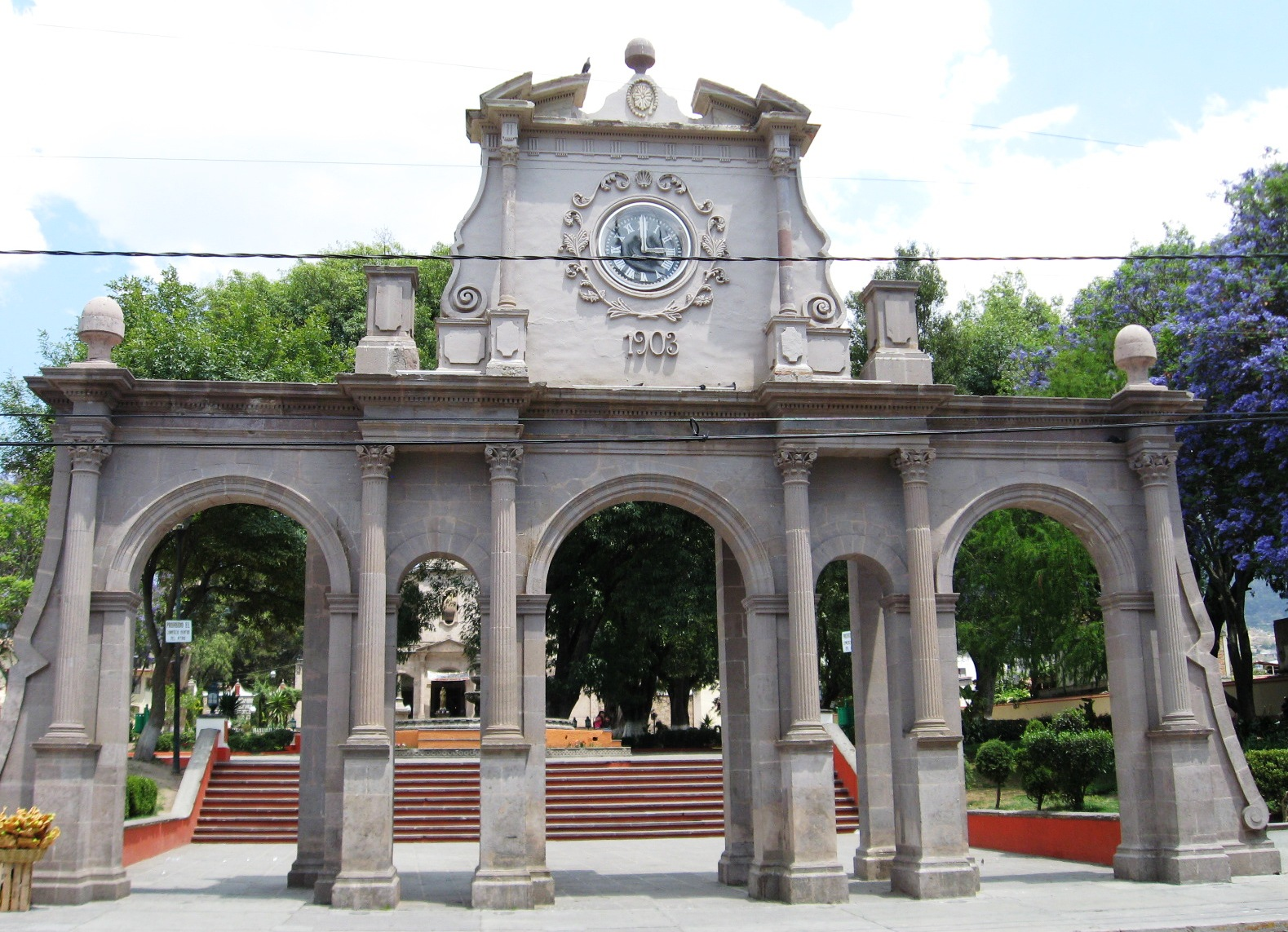

- Location within Mexico
- Coordinates: 19°54′53″N 100°00′13″W
- Country: Mexico
- State: State of Mexico
- Municipal seat: Temascalcingo de José María Velasco
- Founded: 1826

Government
  - Municipal President: Sebastian Gerardo Lezama Plata (2006–2009)
- Elevation (of seat): 2,260 m (7,410 ft)

Population (2005) Municipality
  - Municipality: 58,169
  - Seat: 11,454
- Time zone: UTC-6 (Central)
- Postal code (of seat): 50400
- Area code: 718
- Website: (in Spanish) www.temascalcingo.gob.mx

Temascalcingo is one of 125 municipalities in the State of Mexico, Mexico. The municipal seat is the town of Temascalcingo de José María Velasco. It is located in the northwest of the state. The temazcal was very common in Temascalcingo. The name Temascalcingo has its roots in Nahuatl. It means place of the little temazcal. The town is one of the "Pueblo con Encanto" (Towns with Charm) of the State of Mexico.

== The town ==
=== History ===
The earliest settlements in the area go back over 10,000 years and are situated near what is today the Lerma River. The earliest known inhabitants of the area were the Mazahua. It was originally called "Ñiñi Mbate" which probably means 'place of the small plain' but possibly 'place of the first man'. This area was conquered by the Aztecs before the 16th century, and its last Aztec governor was named Ocoyotzen. When the Spanish invaded, the Mazahuas and the Otomis of this area united with the Aztecs to fight them. However, after the Spanish victory, Hernán Cortés distributed this area, along with Metepec to Francisco de Villegas in 1540. In 1535, the Franciscans began evangelization here, establishing churches and renaming the area, San Miguel Temascalcingo. Through the 18th century, haciendas here grew to supply grain to mining areas like Tlalpujahua and El Oro. Because of a history of mistreatment by colonial authorities, the residents here sided early with Hidalgo when the Mexican War of Independence broke out in 1810. Shortly after the end of the war, the State of Mexico was created in 1824 and the municipality of Temascalcingo in 1825, with San Miguel Temascalcingo as the seat. This area was the scene of a destructive earthquake in 1912. As the birthplace of the painter José María Velasco Gómez, the town changed its name to Temascalcingo de José María Velasco July 14, 1945 by decree. However, it is still commonly referred to simply as "Temascalcingo". In 1988, a group of residents from Tepeolulco, a community under Temascalcingo's jurisdiction, took over the municipal hall to protest water supplies and civil rights violations.

=== The town today ===
The town today has an altitude of 2,380 meters and in 2005 had a population of 11,454 people. The town is centered on a square called the Plaza Centenario, with its Municipal Palace to the south of the square. To the north is another, smaller square dedicated to painter José María Velasco.

To the west of the main plaza is the Parish of San Miguel Arcángel. This church was rebuilt in 1939 in Neoclassic style, mostly imitating the design of the Church of El Carmen in Celaya, Guanajuato. It was built with pink stone that is found in this region. It has only one tower, which contains a clock. Its interior altarpieces are all done in mahogany by sculptor Fidel Enríquez Pérez. In front of the church is a large atrium park.

The Centro Cultural José María Velasco, on Hermanos Velascos Street, is dedicated to the art of this landscape painter. Most of Velasco's themes reside in botany and in nature, but he is best known for the landscapes he painted of areas in central Mexico. Also in his honor is the José María Velasco Nature Park, located at the main entrance to the town. This is a section of forest that offers some amenities such as kiosks, playgrounds, and a small pool.

=== Food and festivities ===
Local dishes include chicken in "chirrión" sauce, "charales con nopales, cactus in green salsa, and "mole de olla" with xoconostles (a type of fruit). Local drinks include "puscua," a drink made from corn, "sende choo," a Mazahua drink made from fermented corn and pulque, which is often served flavored with fruit such as cactus pears.

From December 31 to January 1, Mazahua and Otomi pilgrims come here to celebrate the "Lord of the Coronation," carrying their images of this saint adorned with flowers, fruit and bread, accompanied by flutes, mariachis or drums. Local dances such as "Las Pastoras," "Los Concheros," "Los Macheteros," "Los Romanos" and "Los Chimales" are performed. At midday on January 1, there is a procession to the church. On Jan 2, men on horseback arrive here in honor of the image here of Saint Francis of Assisi.

The passion play held every year since 1975, whose script was written by Amalio Quintana. During this Passion Play, young men re-enact the crucifixion of Christ. The Feast of Corpus Christi is celebrated in June with large processions as well. A more locally derived festival occurs on the 16th of August, in honor of "Lord Ndareje" or "Lord of the Water." Prehispanic rites occur at the Los Pastores waterfall and offerings are left in the Lerma River.

=== Notable residents ===
Some notable people from this town include: José Maria Velasco (1840–1912), who was a painter of landscapes, Archbishop Leopoldo Ruiz y Flóres (1865–1941), who suffered the exile three times during the Cristero movement in Mexico, María del Carmen Garduño Cervantes (born 1955), a track-and-field athlete who has won medals in the PanAmerican Games and set Mexican records, and Pinito Reynoso Bejarano (1895–1981), an educator best known for his work against illiteracy.

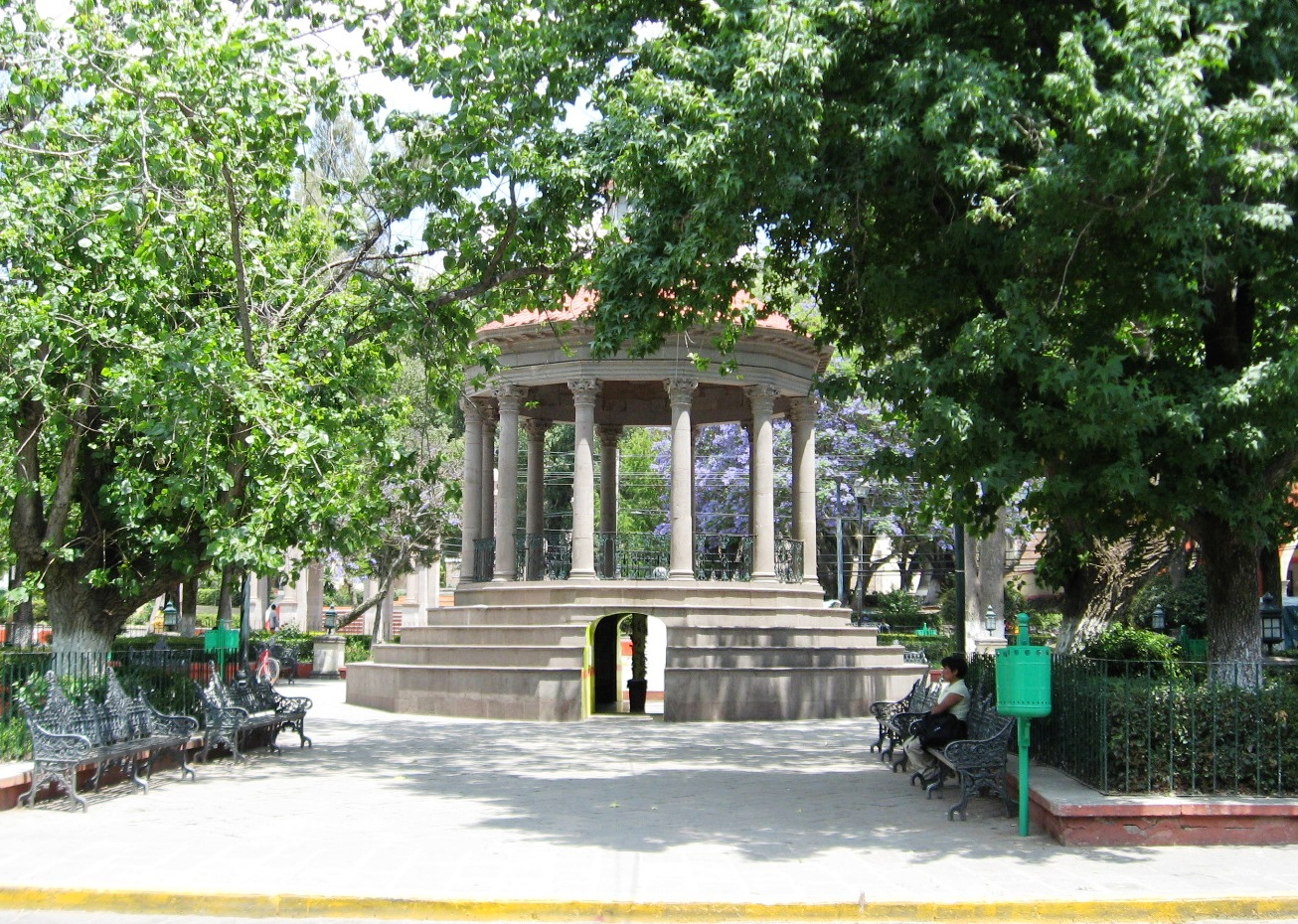
Centenario Kiosk

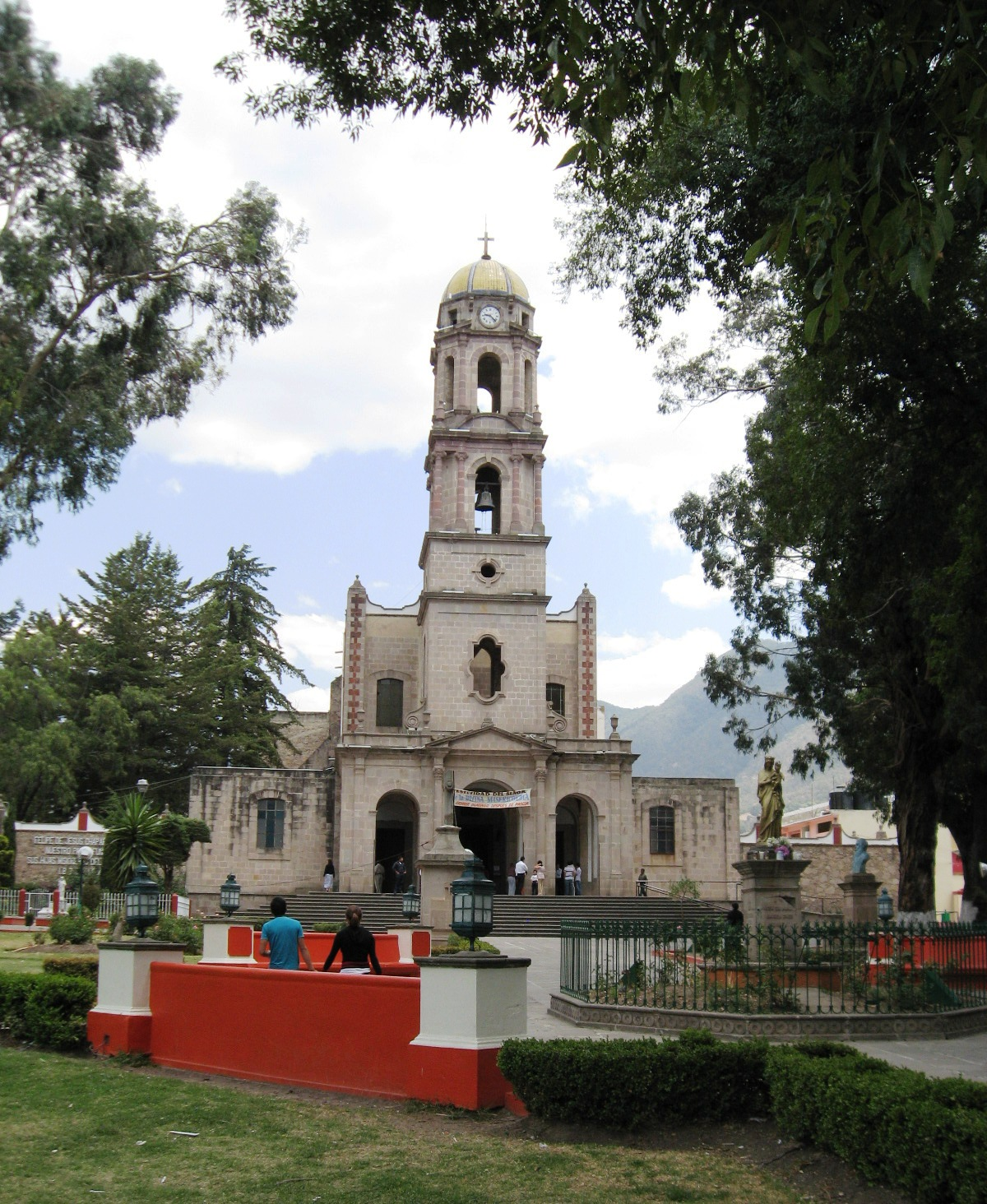
San Miguel Arcangel Church

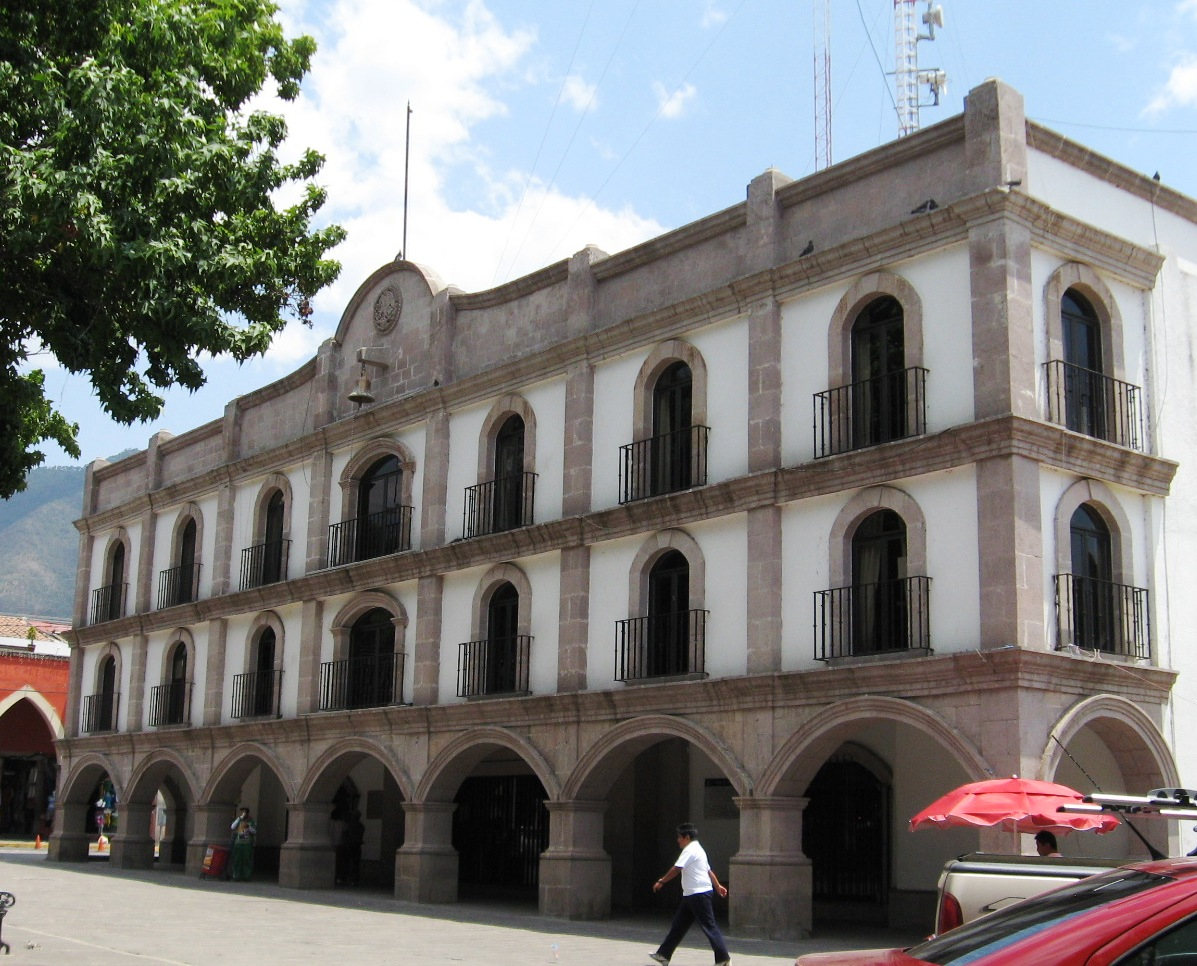
Municipal Palace

== The municipality ==
As municipal seat, the town of Temascalcingo de José Maria Velasco has governing jurisdiction over the following communities: Ahuacatitlan Centro, Boshesda, Calderas, Cerritos de Cárdenas, Barrio de Corona, Guadalupe Ixtapa, La Huerta, Juanacatlán, La Magdalena, Mesa de Bañi, Mesa de Santiago (La Mesa), Pastores Primer Barrio, Puruahua, Pueblo Nuevo Solís (La Estancia), San Antonio Solís, San Francisco Solís, San Francisco Tepeolulco, San José Ixtapa, San José Solís, San Juanico el Alto (San Juanico), San Mateo el Viejo, San Miguel Solís, San Nicolás Solís, San Pedro el Alto, San Pedro Potla Centro (San Pedro Potla), Santa Ana Yenshu Centro, Santa Lucía (Ejido de San Mateo el Viejo), Santa María Canchesda, Santa María Solís, Santa Rosa Solís, Santiago Coachochitlán, San Vicente Solís, Ex-hacienda de Solís, El Tejocote (La Loma), Santa Ana Yenshu Ejido, San Pedro Potla Segundo Barrio, San Pedro Potla Primer Barrio Ejido, San José los Reyes, El Rodeo, Cuadrilla, Ahuacatitlán (La Providencia), Barrio de Shelle, Estación Solís (Estación Alberto Garduño), El Garay, La Mesa del Venado, Pozo de las Palomas, San Juanico Centro, San Pedro Potla Tercer Barrio, Santa Ana Yenshu la Mesa, Los Pinos, La Estanzuela, Ixtapa, Mesa de Bombaro, Mesa de los Garnica, Mogote de la Campana, Barrio las Peñas, Barrio Santa María los Chamacueros, San Fco. Tepeolulco, Tercer Barrio la Mesa, La Magdalena Bosha, La Magdalena Cruz Blanca, Santiago Coachochitlán Barrio del Rincón, Los Pastores (Pastores Segundo Barrio), San Pedro de la Loma, and La Loma de San Mateo. Temascalcingo is bordered by the municipalities of Acambay, Atlacomulco, Jocotitlán and El Oro, and to the west by the states of Michoacán and Querétaro. The population of the entire municipality in 2005 was 58,169 people.

Two notable sites in and near the municipal seat are the Tzindo, which is an archeological zone where there are some cave drawings. From Colonial period there is the Hacienda de Solis. Located about 18 km from the municipal seat, the largest attraction here is officially called the "Spring of Jesus," but is more commonly known as "El Borbollón," (the gusher). It is a natural spring of volcanically heated water which forms a pool of water with a high mineral content.
