= Morelos, State of Mexico =

Morelos
- Municipality
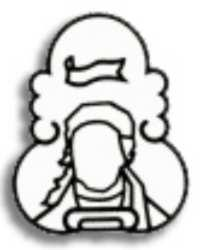
- Coat of arms

- Location in Mexico
- Coordinates: 19°44′N 99°38′W
- Country: Mexico
- State: Mexico (state)
- Municipal Seat: San Bartolo Morelos

Area
  - Total: 222.76 km^{2} (86.01 sq mi)
- 26,430
- Time zone: UTC-6 (Central Standard Time)

Morelos is one of 125 municipalities in the State of Mexico in Mexico. The municipal seat is the town of San Bartolo Morelos which is the fifth largest town in the municipality. The municipality covers an area of 222.76 km^{2}.

As of 2005, the municipality had a total population of 26,430.
