= Soyaniquilpan =

Soyaniquilpan de Juárez
- Municipality
- Coat of arms

- Location in Mexico
- Coordinates: 19°59′21″N 99°26′10″W
- Country: Mexico
- State: Mexico (state)
- Municipal seat: San Francisco Soyaniquilpan

Area
  - Total: 140.77 km^{2} (54.35 sq mi)
- Elevation: 2,323 m (7,621 ft)

Population (2005)
  - Total: 10,719
- Time zone: UTC-6 (Central Standard Time)

Soyaniquilpan de Juárez is a municipality in the State of Mexico in Mexico. The municipal seat is San Francisco Soyaniquilpan. The municipality covers an area of 140.77 km^{2} (54.35 sq mi).

As of 2005, the municipality had a total population of 10,719.

== Cultural ==
=== Casa de cultura ===
- Casa de Cultura Soyaniquilpan de Juárez.

=== Bibliotecas ===
- Sor Juana Inés de la Cruz

== Histórico ==
- Ex-hacienda La Goleta
- Ex-hacienda de Tandejé
- La Casa Arcada

Iglesias

- Capilla de la Virgen del Carmen.
- Parroquia de San Francisco de Asís

== Deporte ==
- Unidad Deportiva
- Lienzo Charro
