= Chapa de Mota =

- Town & Municipality
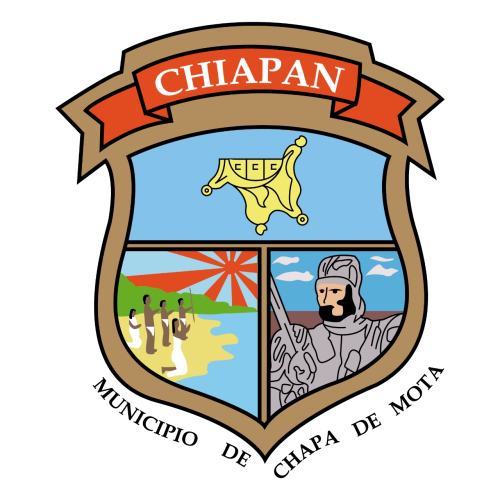
- Coat of arms

- Location within Mexico
- Coordinates: 19°48′52″N 99°31′37″W
- Country: Mexico
- State: State of Mexico

Government
  - Municipal President: Leticia Zepeda Martínez (2006-2009)
- Elevation (of seat): 2,644 m (8,675 ft)

Population (2005) Municipality
  - Municipality: 21,746
  - Seat: 699
- Time zone: UTC-6 (CST)
- Postal code (of seat): 54350
- Website: https://web.archive.org/web/20080317153703/http://www.chapademota.com.mx/

Chapa de Mota (Otomian languages: Anyãnttöhö, 'head of the mountain') is one of 125 municipalities located in the northwest of Mexico State. The municipal seat is the village of Chapa de Mota and largest town is San Felipe Coamango. It is located in the north part of the State of Mexico. By car, it is two hours from Mexico City.

== The town ==
The Chapa de Mota area was first inhabited in the early 16th century by different ethnic groups; however, the Otomis had the control over the whole zone and established the original village. The Mexica eventually conquered the area.

In Chapa de Mota, today, there are many retail businesses like clothing stores, footwear stores, butchers, groceries and pharmacies. Finally there is an industry called Camil SA. De CV, that manufactures plastic hooks. (City hall)

== The municipality ==
As municipal seat, the town of Chapa de Mota has governing jurisdiction over the following communities:

Barajas, Cadenqui, Damate, Danxhó, Ejido de Barajas, Ejido de San Felipe Coamango, Dongu, El Chabacano, El Puerto, San Gabriel, El Quinte, El Salto, Ex-hacienda de Bodengui, La Alameda, La Concepción, La Esperanza, La Ladera, La Loma, La Palma, Las Ánimas, Los Limones, Macavaca (Santa Ana Macavaca), Mefi, Rancho el Tejocote, Rancho la Soledad, Rancho los Negritos, San Felipe Coamango, San Francisco de las Tablas, San Gabriel, San Juan Tuxtepec, San Rafael (Balneario las Cascadas), Santa Elena, Santa María, Tenjay, Venú, Ventey, Xhoñe, and Xhote.

The principal economic activities are agriculture, farming and industry; the population in Chapa de Mota is about 756 people. Chapa de Mota has forests with much vegetation and animals.

=== Flora and fauna ===
Chapa De Mota is rich in natural resources; the principal landmark is mountains and rainforest. There are many kinds of vegetation and animals. In the forests of Chapa de Mota, there are pines, oyamel firs, ocote pines, oaks, cedars, eucalyptus, and other kinds of trees. Native animals include rabbits, squirrels, moles, bats, weasels, badgers, tlacuaches, and ferrets, as well as reptiles and insects like frogs, chameleons, scorpions, snakes, ants, bees, and crickets.

=== Economic activities ===
In Chapa de Mota the principal economic activities are irrigation and agriculture, especially corn, oats, beans and broad beans as well as the breeding of cattle, pigs, poultry and sheep. Camping in mountainous zones is a popular tourist activity.

In the open area called "Mexico Chiquito" there are model plane competitions.

Also in Chapa de Mota (the seat) there are many clothing stores, footwear stores, butcheries, groceries and pharmacies. Camil SA. De CV manufactures plastic hooks. (City hall)
