= Acambay =

- Town & Municipality
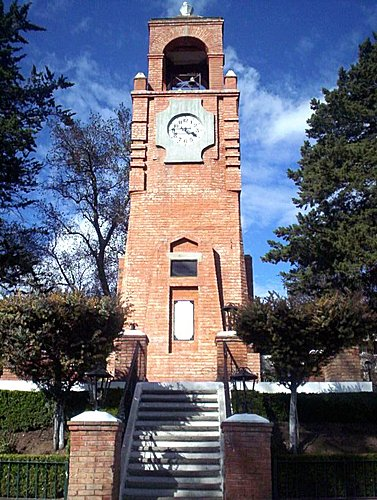

- Coat of arms

- Location of the town of Acambay
- Coordinates: 19°57′14″N 99°50′35″W
- Country: Mexico
- State: State of Mexico
- Municipal Status: 1824

Government
  - Municipal President: Angelica Colin Pacheco

Area
  - Municipality: 492.13 km^{2} (190.01 sq mi)
- Elevation (of seat): 2,550 m (8,370 ft)

Population (2005) Municipality
  - Municipality: 56,847
  - Seat: 3,724
- Time zone: UTC-6 (Central)
- Postal code (of seat): 50301
- Website: Official site

Acambay is a town and municipio (municipality) located in northern State of Mexico. The township of Acambay is the municipal seat of the municipio of the same name.

== History ==
The origins of Acambay date back to the settlement of the area by the Otomis who founded a ceremonial center called Huamango, which was occupied from 850 to 1350. It was the most important cultural center before the rise of the Tula civilization. The area is now known as the San Miguel plateau. While the cause of the center's abandonment is not absolutely known, some legends indicate that it was destroyed by an earthquake, forcing the population to move. The nearby town of Benguitú, which was subsequently named Cabayé or Acambay was founded by the same tribe of Otomis soon after the abandonment of Huamango.

After the Spanish conquest, the area now known as Acambay was originally entrusted to Capt. Juan Jaramillo de Salvatierra, who belonged to Hernán Cortés's army. Later the area was granted to Don Mateo de San Juan Chimalpopoca Izcóatl of San Miguel Cambay and descendant of Cuauhtémoc. "Acambay" is derived from "San Miguel Cambay". The area was then evangelized by the Franciscans, building the parish church, and the monastery of San Miguel in 1623. The location of the Parroquia de San Miguel (Parish of Saint Michael) has been a church for the town since the 17th century; however, nothing of the original structure remains. In 1912, an earthquake devastated the town, and it, like everything else was completely rebuilt. The fault system that triggered is known as the Acambay-Tixmadejé Fault System.

Aside from the town church, the Otomi Ceremonial Center is without a doubt the most important venue in Acambay; it is influenced by Mexica and Toltec prehispanic cultures. It is located in the "Casa de Cultura Dr. Maximiliano Ruiz Castañeda".

== The municipality ==
As municipal seat, the town of Acambay has governmental jurisdiction over the following communities:

Agostadero (San José Agostadero), Agua Limpia, Barrancas, Barrio de Candeje, Boshi Chiquito, Boshi Grande, Boshindo, Boti (Boti Agostadero), Botidi, Bovini, Buenavista, Cañada del Gallo, Cerrito de Tixmadeje, Chanteje, Conejeras, Dateje, Deshpe, Detiña (San Antonio Detiña), Detiña Ejido, Dongu (Dongu Centro), Dongu Barrio Dos, Dongu Barrio Uno, Dongu Puerto, Doxteje Barrio Dos, Doxteje Barrio Primero, Doxteje Centro, Ejido Tixmadeje, El Capulín (Barrio el Capulín la Loma), El Ermitaño, El Fresadero, El Medrano, El Pedregal Tixmadeje, Endeje, Esdoca, Gando, Ganzda, Hacienda Toto, Hondiga, Juando, La Caridad, La Cumbre, La Estancia Sector Dos, La Estancia Sector Uno (La Estancia), La Florida, La Huerta, La Laguna, La Loma (Santa María la Loma), La Manga, La Nopalera, La Palma, La Providencia Doxteje, La Soledad, La Teresa (Santa Teresa), La Terquedad, La Venta (Barrio la Venta), Las Arenas (San Agustín), Las Chivas (El Cerro), Las Golondrinas, Las Mangas, Las Pomas Ejido de Dateje, Las Trojes, Loma de Emmedio, Loma de San Ángel, Loma del Fresno, Loma Linda, Los Charcos, Los Pilares, Los Sauces, Los Toriles, Mado Sector Dos, Mado Sector Uno, Muyteje, Pathé, Pueblo Nuevo, Puentecillas, Rancho Castilla de las Águilas, Rancho la Venta, Rancho Lucero, Rincón de Juando, San Agustín la Loma, San Antonio las Palmas, San Francisco Shaxni, San Francisco Shaxni Ejido, San Ildefonso (San Ildefonso Yolotepec), San José Bocto, San Juanico Sector Dos, San Juanico Sector Uno, San Nicolás Acambay, San Pedro de los Metates, Santa María las Arenas, Santa María las Arenas Dos, Tixmadeje Barrio Dos, Tixmadeje Chiquito, Tixmadeje Grande (Santa María Tixmadeje). The total population of the municipality is 56,849.

It borders the state of Querétaro and Aculco to the north, to the east with Aculco and Timilpan, to the south with Timilpan, Atlacomulco and Temascalcingo, and to the west with Temascalcingo and the state of Querétaro. The municipality covers an area of 492.13 square kilometres (190.01 sq mi), representing 2.21% of the state's territory.

The area is quite irregular, with hills, and steep mountainous formations, deep gullies and valleys. The mountains and plateaus occupy nearly two thirds of the total area of the municipality. Some of the most significant mountains include Las Palomas, El Colmilludo, San Antonio, Dongú, La Cumbre, and La Manga. The major river is called Las Adjuntas.

Farming is the most important activity in the municipality. The main crops are corn, potatoes, oats, beans, and vegetables. Almost every community raises domestic farm animals like cattle, horses, goats and pigs. Retail business is another economic activity including corner stores, open air markets, pharmacies, clothing stores, shoe stores, furniture shops, retail stores, fruit and vegetables stands.

There are 8,100 speakers of Otomi and Náhuatl, most of whom are located in ethnic communities outside the municipal seat, representing only 30% of the total population. The rest are monolingual Spanish speakers.

The municipality provides education to a total of 16,724 students at different levels of education imparted by 808 teachers in 222 schools.

The literacy rate has increased in recent years with 78% of the total population over 15 years able to read. It is predicted that this percentage will increase to 90%.

Of the total population residing in the town, 2.04% receive medical services by the IMSS, 27.73% from ISSSTE and 3.92% by ISSEMYM. The remaining 66.32% receive care from the private and public health as ISEM and DIFEM.

These are some of the regional holidays and celebrations:

- San Sebastián Celebration held on January 20 featuring folk dances and the world-famous dance of the “Moros & Christians”.
- A Spring Celebration held on the second Friday of Lent. It is a carnival celebrated with allegorical cars, music and dances.
- Corpus Christi Day celebrated on the first Thursday of June, gathering all the images from nearby communities, and the "Macheteros" and "Tixmadejé" dances are performed.
- The “Our Holy Father Jesus Party”, takes place on the first Sunday in August, and the main attraction is a firework display.
- The Feast of St. Michael is held on September 29. For this celebration certain religious displays are made of Moors, Christians and Sheppards. Dance parties are very common on this date along with the fireworks and live music.
