= Timilpan =

Coordinates: 19°52′N 99°44′W

- Municipality
- Coat of arms
- Interactive map of Timilpan
- Country: Mexico
- State: Mexico (state)
- Municipal Seat: San Andrés Timilpan

Area
  - Total: 179.82 km^{2} (69.43 sq mi)

Population (2005)
  - Total: 14,335
- Time zone: UTC-6 (Central Standard Time)

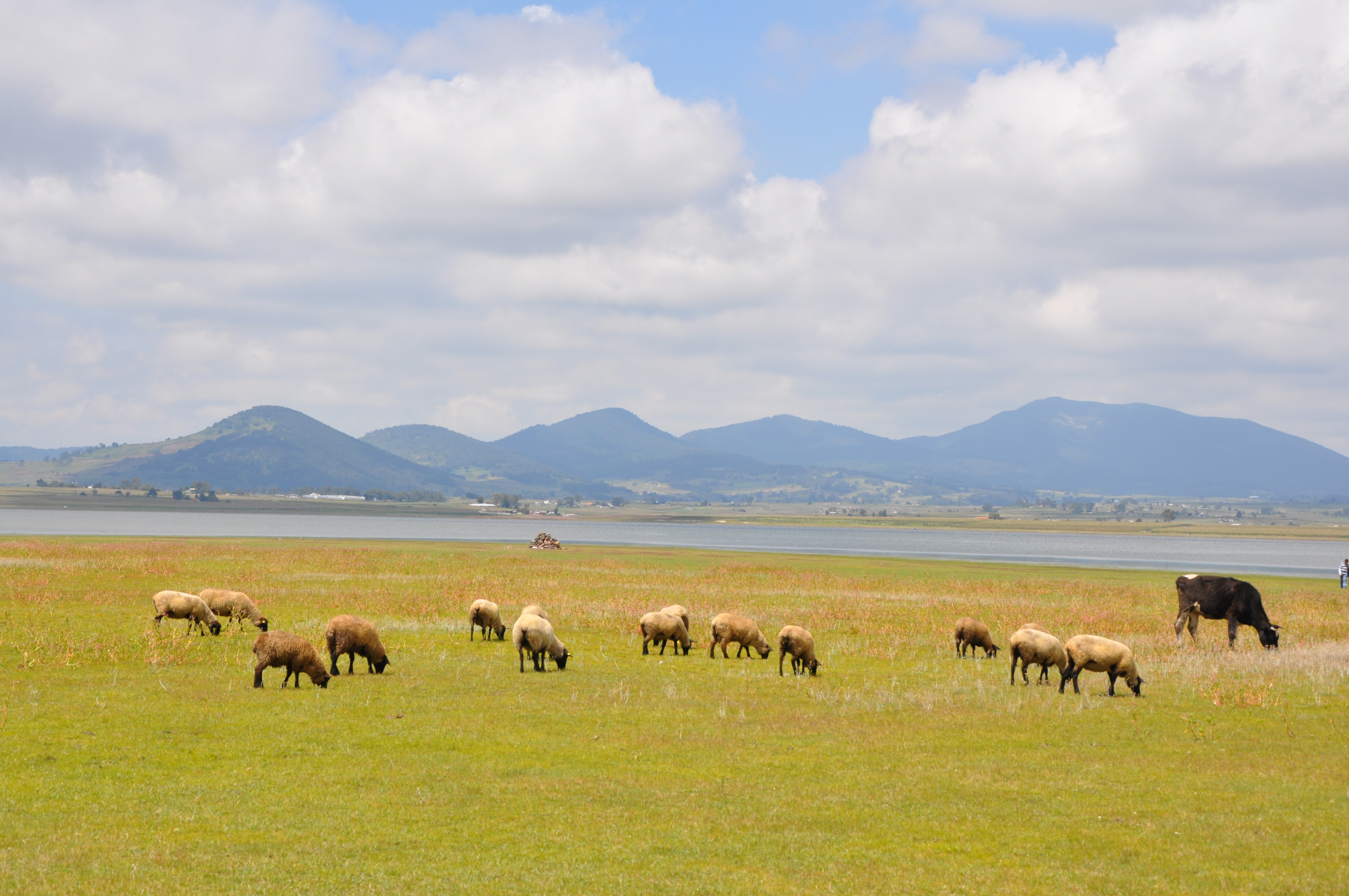

Timilpan is a municipality in Mexico State in Mexico. The municipal seat is the town of San Andrés Timilpan which is the fourth largest town in the municipality. The municipality covers an area of 179.82 km^{2}.

As of 2005, the municipality had a total population of 14,335.
