= Enrique Peña Nieto =

President of Mexico from 2012 to 2018

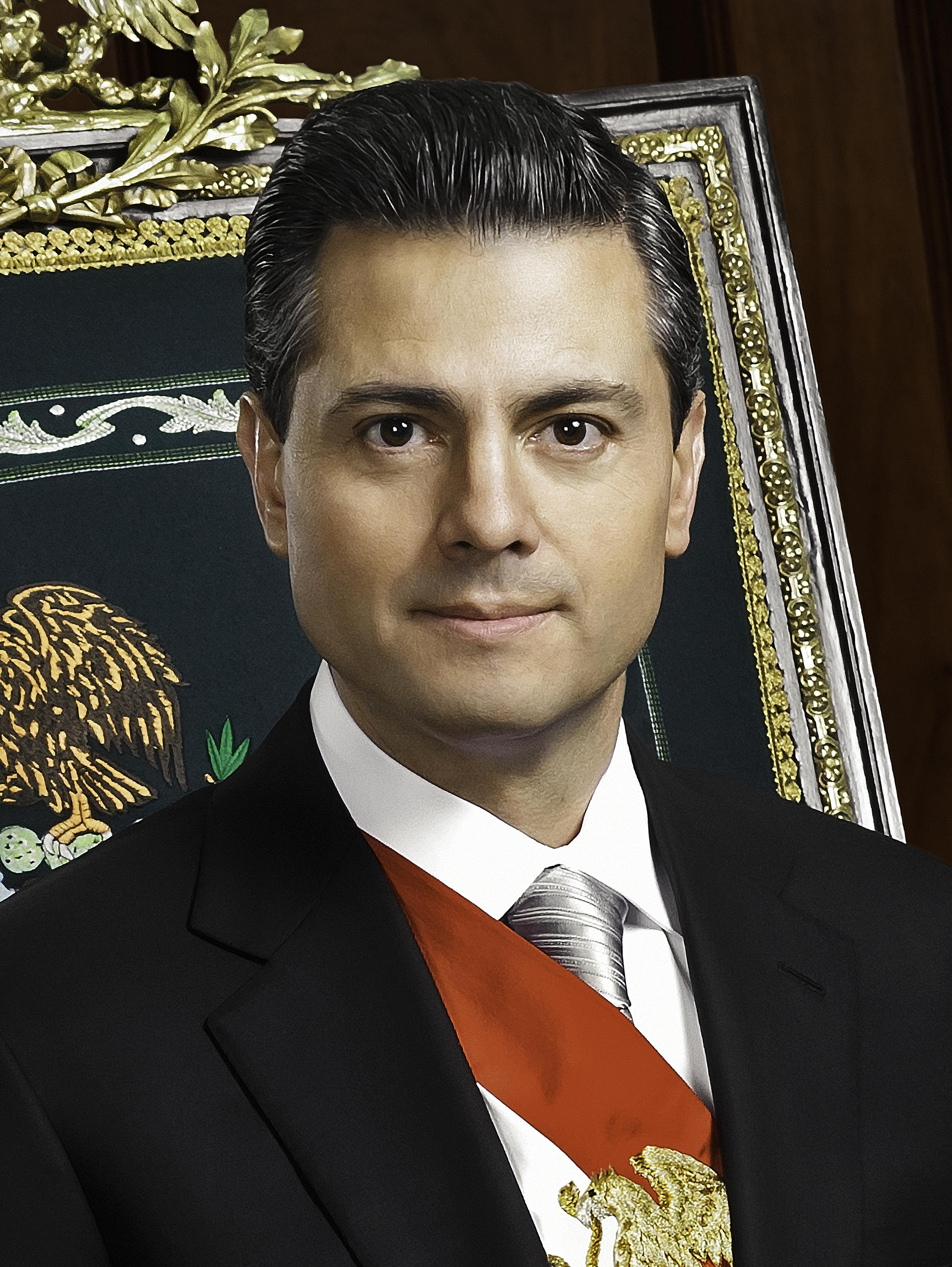
- Official portrait, 2012

64th President of Mexico
- In office 1 December 2012 – 30 November 2018
- Preceded by: Felipe Calderón
- Succeeded by: Andrés Manuel López Obrador

President pro tempore of the Pacific Alliance
- In office 20 June 2014 – 3 July 2015
- Preceded by: Juan Manuel Santos
- Succeeded by: Ollanta Humala

Governor of the State of Mexico
- In office 16 September 2005 – 15 September 2011
- Preceded by: Arturo Montiel Rojas
- Succeeded by: Eruviel Ávila Villegas

Member of the Congress of the State of Mexico
- In office 5 September 2003 – 14 January 2005
- Preceded by: Arturo Osornio Sánchez
- Succeeded by: Jesús Alcántara Núñez
- Constituency: 13th district

Secretary of Administration of the State of Mexico
- In office 11 May 2000 – 4 December 2002
- Governor: Arturo Montiel Rojas
- Preceded by: Ernesto Nemer Álvarez
- Succeeded by: Luis Miranda Nava

Personal details
- Born: Enrique Peña Nieto; 20 July 1966 (age 60) Atlacomulco, State of Mexico, Mexico
- Party: Institutional Revolutionary Party
- Spouses: Mónica Pretelini (m. 1993; died 2007) Angélica Rivera (m. 2010; div. 2019)
- Children: 4
- Education: Panamerican University (LLB); Monterrey Institute of Technology and Higher Education (MBA)
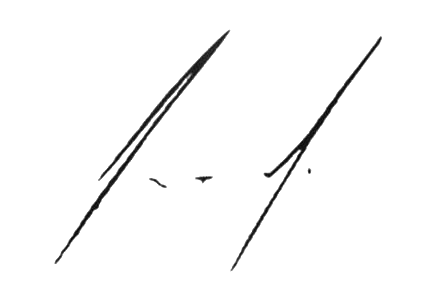
- Signature

Enrique Peña Nieto OMRI CYC GCB (Spanish pronunciation: [enˈrike ˈpeɲa ˈnjeto]; born 20 July 1966), commonly referred to by his initials EPN, is a Mexican former politician and lawyer who served as the 64th president of Mexico from 2012 to 2018. A member of the Institutional Revolutionary Party (PRI), he previously was Governor of the State of Mexico from 2005 to 2011, local deputy from 2003 to 2004, and Secretary of Administration from 2000 to 2002.

Born in Atlacomulco and raised in Toluca, Peña Nieto attended Panamerican University, graduating with a B.A. in legal studies. After attaining an MBA from ITESM, he began his political career by joining the Institutional Revolutionary Party (PRI) in 1984. After serving as a public notary in Mexico City, he began an ascent through local political ranks in the late 1990s, culminating in his 2005 campaign for Governor of the State of Mexico. As governor, he pledged to deliver 608 compromisos (commitments) to his constituency to varying levels of success. His tenure was marked by low-to-moderate approval of his handling of a rising murder rate, the San Salvador Atenco civil unrest, and various public health issues. He launched his 2012 presidential campaign on a platform of economic competitiveness and open government. After performing well in polls and a series of high-profile candidate withdrawals, Peña Nieto was elected president with 38.14% of the vote.

As president, he instated the multilateral Pact for Mexico, which soothed inter-party fighting and increased legislation across the political spectrum. During his first four years, Peña Nieto led a breakup of state monopolies, liberalized Mexico's energy sector, instituted public education reforms, and modernized the country's financial regulation. However, political gridlock and allegations of media control gradually worsened, along with corruption, crime, and drug trade in Mexico. Global drops in oil prices limited the success of his economic reforms. His handling of the Iguala mass kidnapping in 2014 and the escape of drug lord Joaquín "El Chapo" Guzmán from Altiplano prison in 2015 sparked international criticism. Guzmán himself claims to have bribed Peña Nieto during his trial. As of 2022, he is additionally part of the Odebrecht controversy, with former Pemex CEO Emilio Lozoya Austin declaring that Peña Nieto's presidential campaign benefited from illegal campaign funds provided by Odebrecht in exchange for securing public contracts and political favors.

Historical evaluations and approval rates of his presidency have been mostly negative. Detractors highlight a series of failed policies and a strained public presence, while supporters note increased economic competitiveness and loosening of gridlock. He began his term with an approval rate of 50%, hovered around 35% during his inter-years, and finally bottomed out at 12% in January 2017. He left office with an approval rating of only 18% and 77% disapproval. Peña Nieto is seen as one of the most controversial and least popular presidents in the history of Mexico.

== Early life and education ==
Enrique Peña Nieto was born on 20 July 1966 in Atlacomulco, State of Mexico, a city 55 miles (89 km) northwest of Mexico City. He is the oldest of four siblings; his father, Gilberto Enrique Peña del Mazo, was an electrical engineer; his mother, María del Perpetuo Socorro Ofelia Nieto Sánchez, was a schoolteacher. He was related to two former governors of the State of Mexico: Arturo Montiel on his mother's side and Alfredo del Mazo González on his father's side He attended Denis Hall School in Alfred, Maine, during his junior year of high school in 1979 to learn English. After living in Atlacomulco for the first 11 years of his life, Peña Nieto's family moved to the city of Toluca.

In 1975, his father often took him to the campaign rallies of the State of Mexico's governor, Jorge Jiménez Cantú, a close friend of Peña del Mazo. The governor's successor was Alfredo del Mazo González, a cousin of Peña Nieto's father. During Del Mazo González's campaign in 1981, the fourteen-year-old Peña Nieto had his first direct contact with Mexican politics: he began delivering campaign literature in favor of his relative, a memory Peña Nieto recalls as the turning point and start of his deep interest in politics.

In 1985, at the age of 18, Peña Nieto traveled to Mexico City and enrolled at the Universidad Panamericana, where he studied law and later earned a law degree. Peña Nieto's academic thesis was found to contain plagiarism, which became a major public controversy in August 2016. Peña Nieto sought a master's degree in Business Administration (MBA) at the Instituto Tecnológico y de Estudios Superiores de Monterrey (ITESM), based in the State of Mexico.

== Political beginnings ==
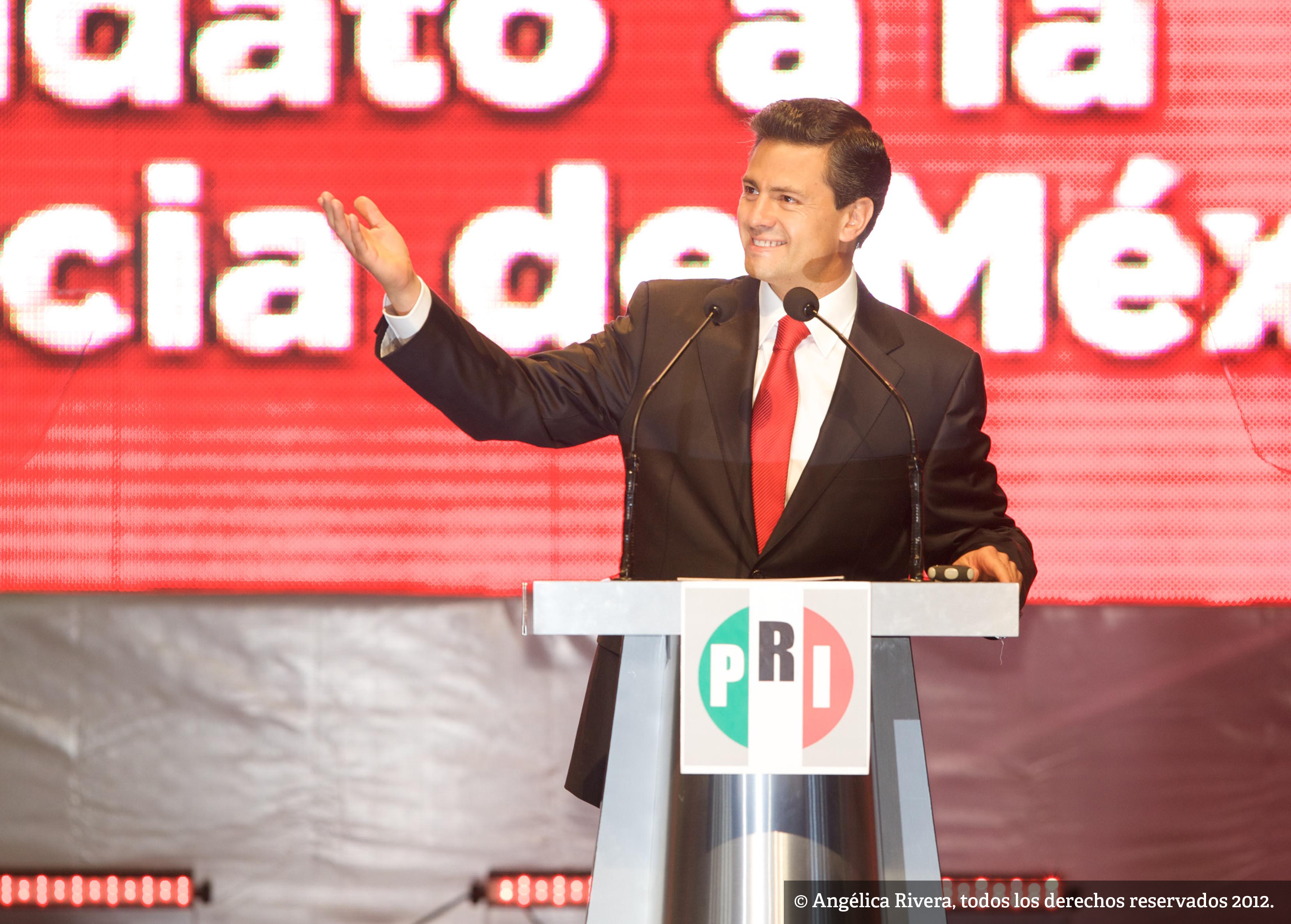
Peña Nieto in 2012

Peña Nieto joined the Institutional Revolutionary Party (PRI) in 1984, and with a law degree nearly completed, he began earning his own money. During his final years in college, Peña Nieto worked for a public notary in Mexico City, around the same time his relative Alfredo del Mazo González was mentioned as a firm candidate for the 1988 presidential elections. In his twenties, he worked at the San Luis Industrial Corporation, an auto parts manufacturer, and the law firm Laffan, Muse, and Kaye. While still a student at the Universidad Panamericana, he roomed with Eustaquio de Nicolás, the current president of Homex, a leading Mexican construction and real estate company. He also befriended and roomed with Luis Miranda, who occupied several offices during the 1999–2000 administration in the State of Mexico.

Peña Nieto formally started his political career under the mentorship of Montiel Rojas, becoming the Secretary of the Citizen Movement of Zone I of the State Directive Committee of the National Confederation of Popular Organizations (CNOP), one of the three sectors of the PRI. For three consecutive years, Peña Nieto participated as a delegate to the Organization and Citizen Front in different municipalities of the State of Mexico. Then, between 1993 and 1998, during Emilio Chuayfett's term as governor, Peña Nieto was chief of staff and personal secretary to Montiel Rojas, the Secretary of Economic Development of the State of Mexico.

After 1999, Peña Nieto went from having low-level secretary positions to higher and more qualified offices. He served from 1999 to 2000 as the sub-secretary of government, and as financial sub-coordinator of the political campaign of Montiel Rojas. In 2001, Montiel Rojas named Peña Nieto Sub-secretary of Interior in the State of Mexico, a position that granted him the opportunity to meet and forge relationships with top PRI politicians and business leaders. After his term concluded, he served as the administrative secretary, president of the Directive Council of Social Security, president of the Internal Council of Health, and vice president of the National System for Integral Family Development – all in the State of Mexico. Under the wing of Montiel Rojas, Peña Nieto formed a group known as the "Golden Boys of Atlacomulco" with other members of the PRI.

=== Campaign for Governor ===
Peña Nieto was elected to a local deputy position in his hometown of Atlacomulco, State of Mexico, in 2003. Two years later, the governorship of the State of Mexico was sought by Atlacomulco-natives Carlos Hank Rhon, Isidro Pastor, Héctor Luna de la Vega, Guillermo González Martínez, Óscar Gustavo Cárdenas Monroy, Eduardo Bernal Martínez, Cuauhtémoc García Ortega and Fernando Alberto García Cuevas. Peña Nieto was among the crowd but was not poised as one of the favorites. Nonetheless, in 2005, Peña Nieto was the last man standing, succeeding Montiel Rojas as governor of the State of Mexico. On 12 February 2005, with 15,000 supporters in attendance, he was sworn in as a candidate for the PRI.

== Governor of the State of Mexico (2005–2011) ==
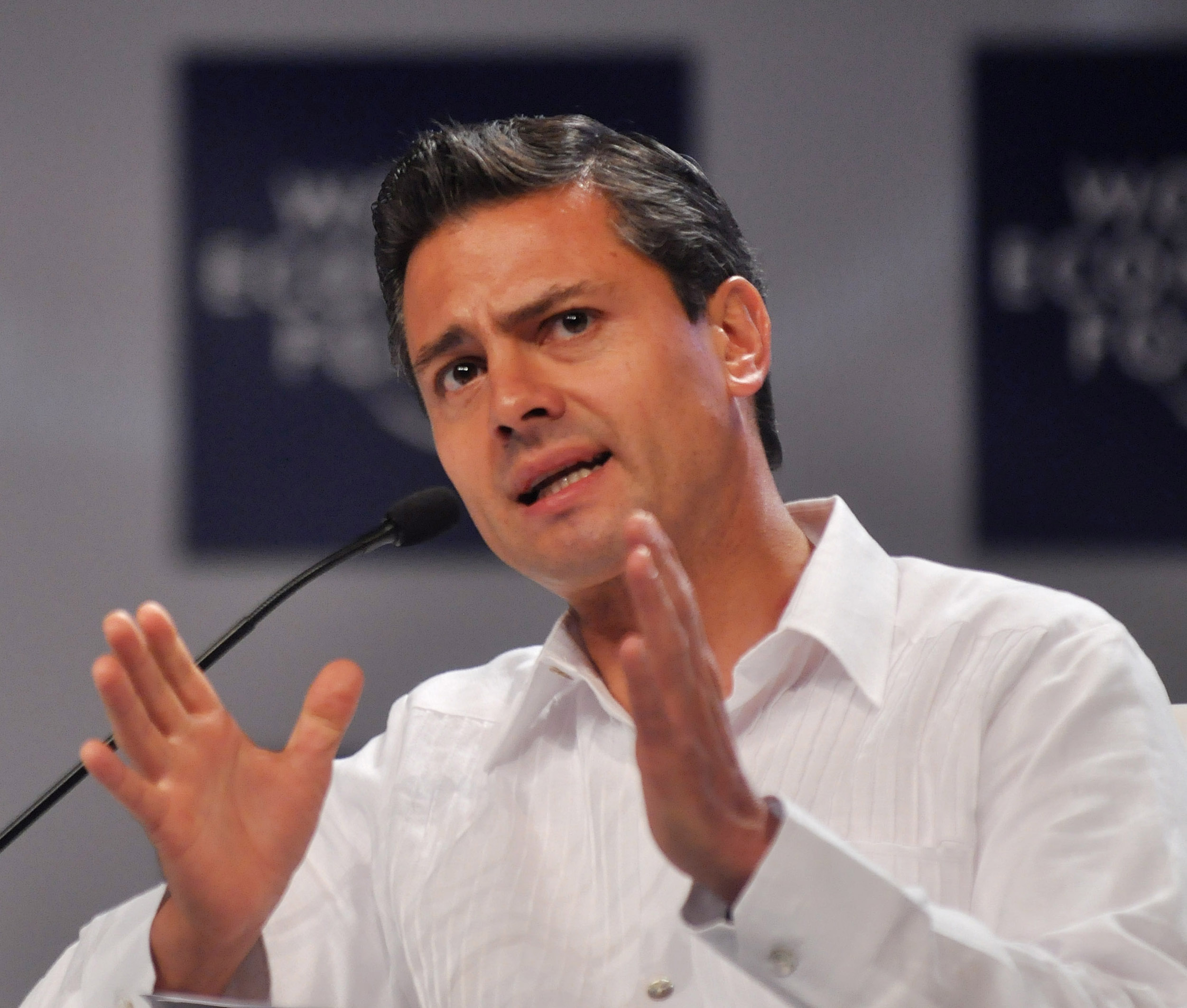
Peña Nieto at the World Economic Forum (2010)

On 15 September 2005, Peña Nieto was sworn in as governor of the State of Mexico at the Morelos Theater in Toluca. Among the attendees were the outgoing governor, Arturo Montiel; the president of the Superior Court of Justice, José Castillo Ambriz; former governors, members of Peña Nieto's cabinet and party; mayors, businessmen, and church figures. The centerpiece of Peña Nieto's governorship was his claim that he was to deliver his compromisos – 608 promises he signed in front of a notary to convince voters that he would deliver results and be an effective leader. According to El Universal, during Peña Nieto's first year as governor, his administration delivered 10 of the structural promises he had advocated in his campaign – marking the lowest figure in his six-year term.

By 2006, his administration carried out 141 promised projects, making that year the most active in the governor's term. The 608 projects Peña Nieto proposed included creating highways, building hospitals, and creating adequate water systems to provide fresh water throughout the state. The most important was highway infrastructure, which tripled under Peña's government. By mid-2011, the official page of the State of Mexico noted that only two projects were left. The major projects in public transportation were the Suburban Railway of the Valley of Mexico Metropolitan Area and the "Mexibús," both of which served commuters between Mexico City and the State of Mexico, providing service to more than 300,000 people every day and 100 million a year. Regarding public health services, 196 hospitals and medical centers were built throughout the state, and the number of mobile units used to attend remote and vulnerable areas doubled. Deaths caused by respiratory diseases were reduced by 55%, while deaths caused by dysentery and cervical cancer were reduced by 68% and 25% respectively. In addition, between 2005 and 2011, the State of Mexico was able to fulfill the requirement of the World Health Organization of having one doctor for every 1,000 inhabitants. The funds for these and all the other commitments were obtained through restructuring the state's public debt, a strategy designed by his first Secretary of Finance, Luis Videgaray Caso. The restructuring also managed to keep the debt from increasing during Peña Nieto's term because the tax base was broadened to the point that it doubled in six years.

Peña Nieto also claimed that he halved the murder rate in the State of Mexico during his time as governor, but retracted this claim after The Economist showed that the murder rate did not diminish and was being measured differently.

The Yo Soy 132 student movement criticized Peña Nieto for his stance on the San Salvador Atenco unrest, which occurred during his term as governor. A report from the National Human Rights Commission (CNDH) stated protestors were subjected to cruel, inhuman, or degrading treatment, arbitrary arrests, and sexual assault, and remarked on the excessive use of force by state and federal police. Peña Nieto stated in an interview that he does not justify the actions of the state and municipal forces, but also mentioned that they were not gladly received by the citizens of San Salvador Atenco upon their arrival.

== Presidential campaign ==
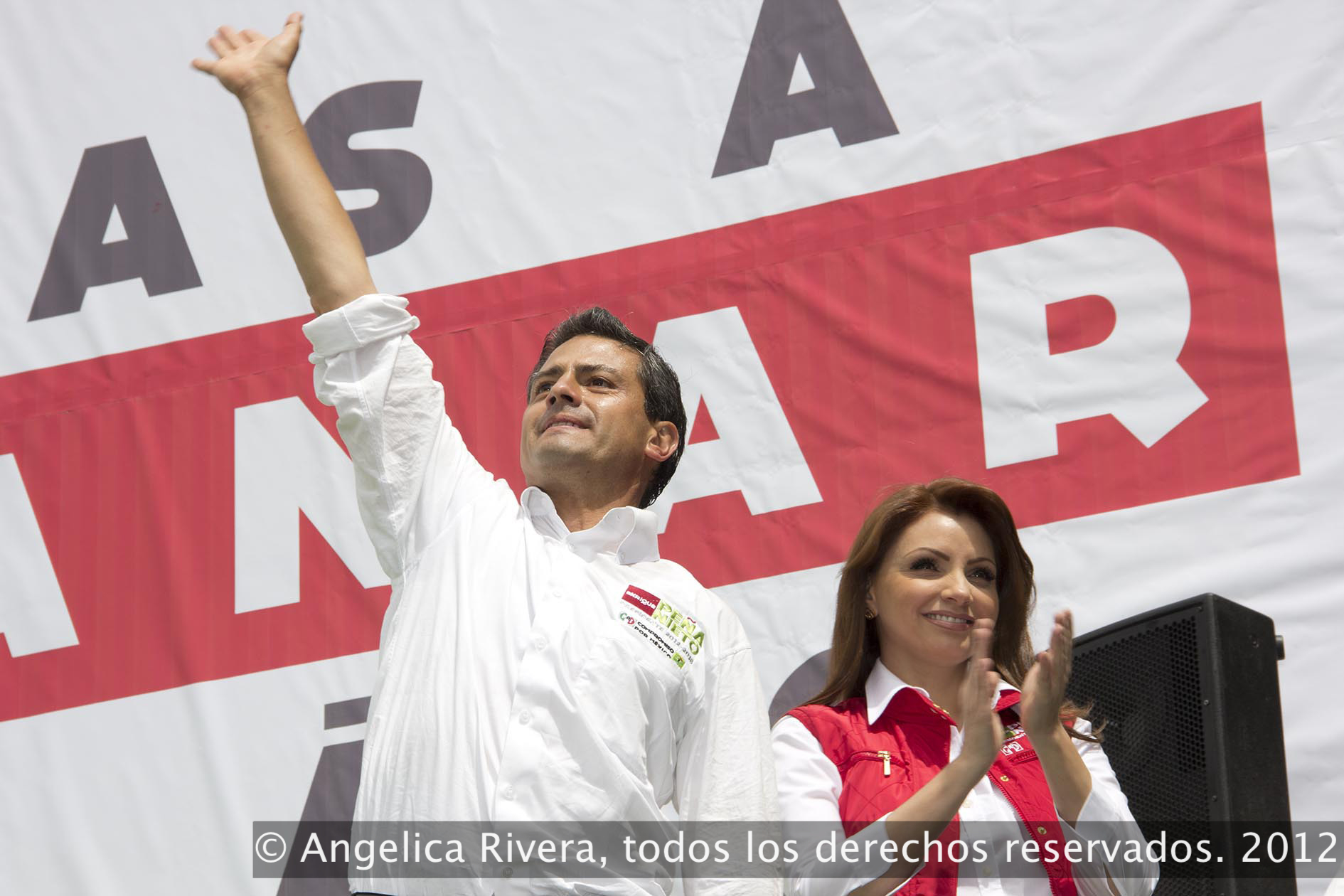
Peña Nieto campaigning in 2012

On 23 November 2011, Peña Nieto attended a book fair in Casa del Lago, Mexico City. There he presented his book México, la gran esperanza (Mexico, the great hope). He was accompanied by the writer Héctor Aguilar Camín, the former governor of Mexico's Central Bank, Guillermo Ortiz Martínez, and the journalist Jaime Sánchez Susarrey. In the book, Peña Nieto argued that Mexico needed to expand its economy to create more jobs, insisting that in the past, the country had only created jobs in the informal sector. Additionally, he argued that promoting Pemex (Mexico's state-owned oil company) to compete in the private sector would create more jobs, elevate productivity, and balance wealth distribution across Mexico. Peña Nieto dedicated the book to his wife Angélica Rivera and to governor Eruviel Ávila Villegas and his family. Peña Nieto said that the return of the PRI marks a new era in Mexico and that his book served as a starting point to take Mexico "to better horizons".

On 27 November 2011, a few days after the book fair, Peña Nieto was the PRI's last standing nominee for the 2012 Mexican presidential elections. The former State of Mexico governor completed his nomination at an event that gathered sympathizers and politicians. Six days earlier, the senator and preliminary candidate of the PRI, Manlio Fabio Beltrones, withdrew from the race and gave Peña Nieto a clear path toward the presidency. During a book fair a month later, Peña Nieto's public image came into question after he struggled to answer a question that asked which three books had marked his life. Later, Peña Nieto was interviewed by El País and admitted that he did not know the price of tortillas. When he was criticized as being out of touch, Peña Nieto insisted that he was not "the woman of the household" and thus would not know the price.

His campaign was supported by the Commitment to Mexico alliance.

=== Elections ===
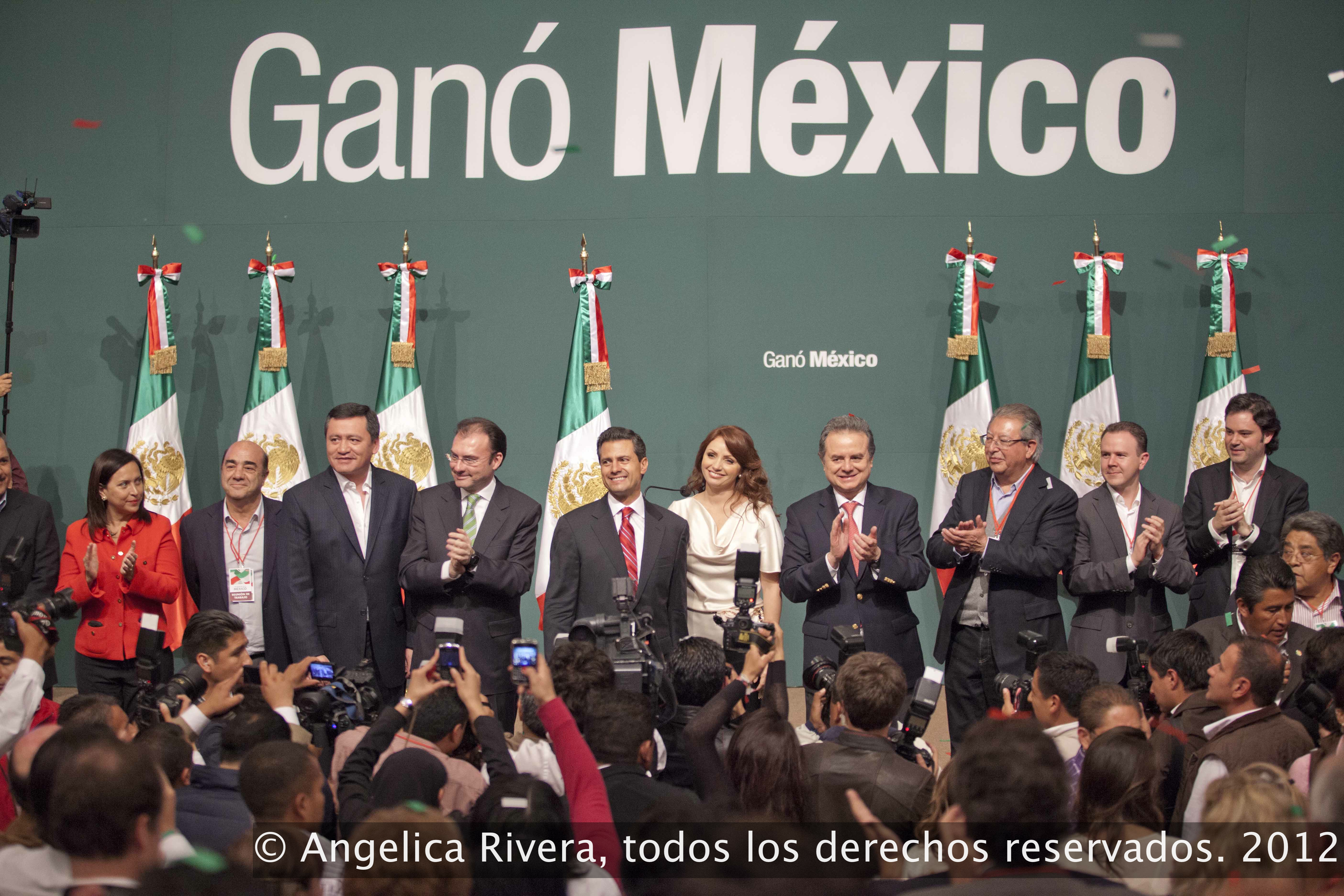
Celebration of the electoral victory of Enrique Peña Nieto as president of the republic.

On 1 July 2012, Mexico's presidential election took place. In an initial, partial count issued that night, the Federal Electoral Institute (IFE) announced that based on a fast vote counting, Peña Nieto was leading the election with 38% of the votes. His nearest competitor, Andrés Manuel López Obrador, was just 6 points behind him. The figures were meant to be a representative sample of the votes nationwide, but shortly after this announcement, Peña Nieto appeared on national television claiming victory. "This Sunday, Mexico won," he said. He thanked his voters and promised to run a government "responsible and open to criticism." At the PRI headquarters in Mexico City, the victory party began. With more than 97% of the votes counted on election day, the PRI had won with about 38% of the votes, 6.4 points above the leftist candidate López Obrador of the Party of the Democratic Revolution (PRD), who refused to concede to the results and had threatened to challenge the outcome, criticizing the PRI for allegedly engaging in vote buying and receiving illegal campaign contributions.

== Presidency (2012–2018) ==
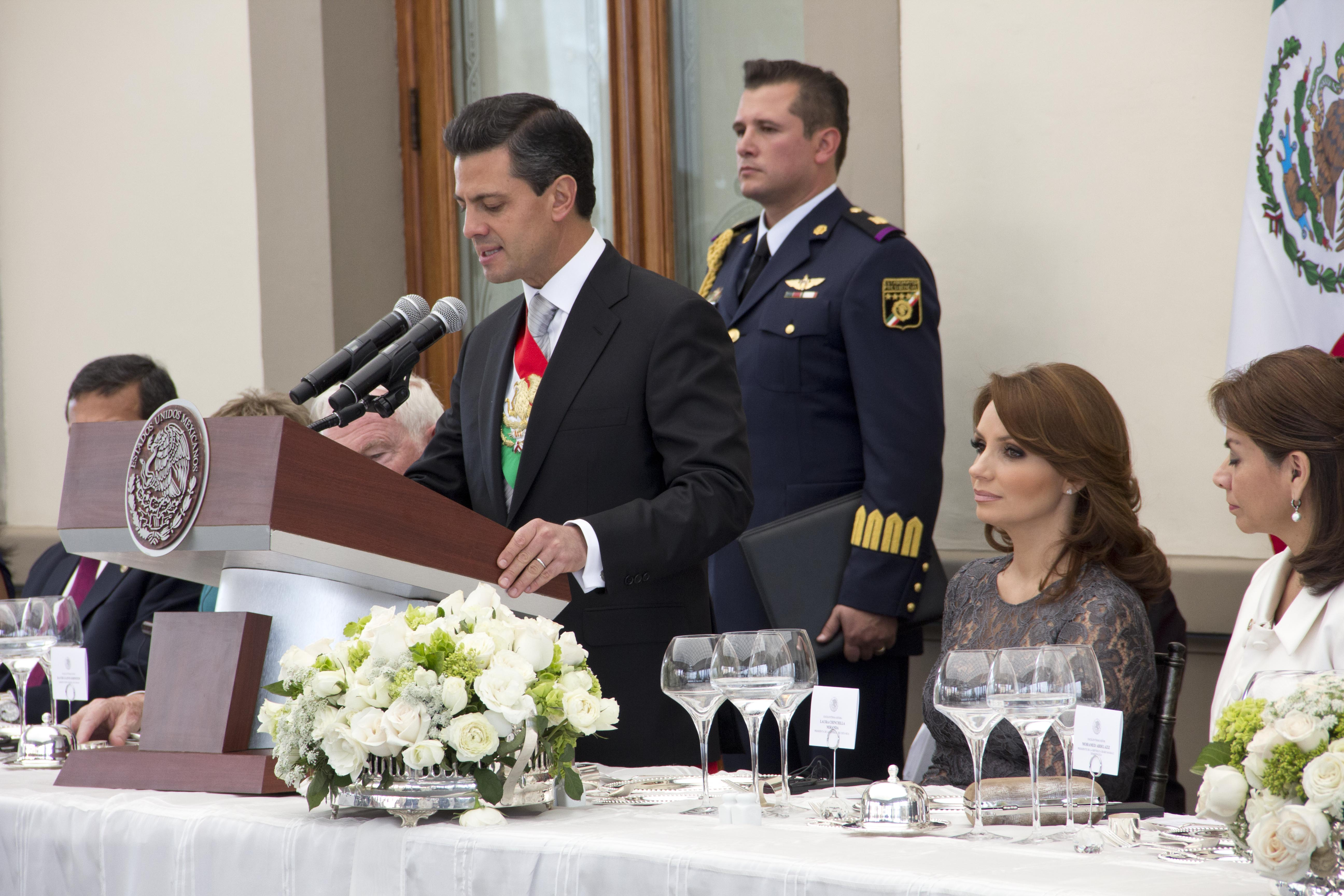
Lunch with heads of State México, D.F. 1 December 2012.

Peña Nieto was sworn in as President of Mexico on 1 December 2012 at the federal congress and later flew to a military parade to formally take control of the armed forces. During his inauguration speech at the National Palace, Peña Nieto proposed his agendas and reforms for the new administration. Before and after the inauguration, in an event that has been labeled by the media as the 1DMX, protesters rioted outside of the National Palace and clashed with Federal Police forces, vandalizing hotel structures and setting fires in downtown Mexico City. More than 90 protesters were arrested, and several were injured. Mayor Marcelo Ebrard blamed "anarchist groups" for the violence. However, there is evidence that agents of provocation worked with the police, and paid 300 Mexican pesos (about US$20) for their acts of vandalism, according to media reports. Photos show protesters waiting in groups behind police lines before the violence. Previous protests had been entirely peaceful, but on this occasion, in apparent response to violence, the police fired rubber bullets. The day after his inauguration, Peña Nieto announced the Pact for Mexico, an agreement that he had struck with the leaders of the two other major parties at the time, Jesús Zambrano Grijalva of the Party of the Democratic Revolution and Gustavo Madero Muñoz of the National Action Party, about the government's goals for the next few years. On 1 December 2018, Enrique Peña Nieto left office and was succeeded by Andrés Manuel López Obrador.

=== Economic policy ===
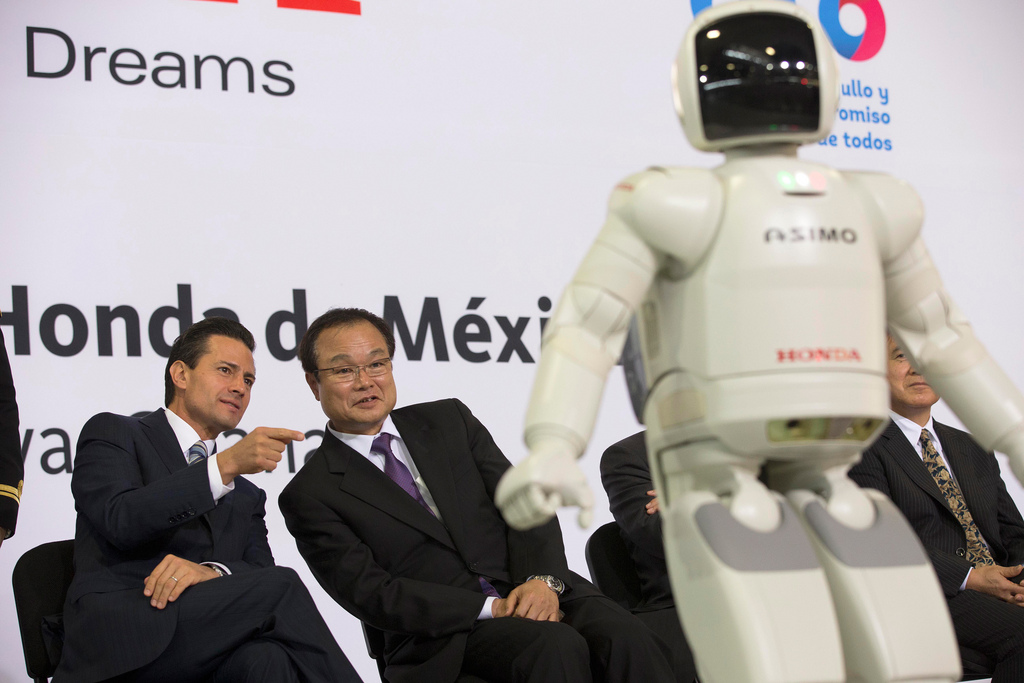
Peña Nieto and Takanobu Ito at the inauguration of the Honda plant in Celaya, Guanajuato on 21 February 2014.

The auto manufacturing industry expanded rapidly under Nieto's presidency. In 2014, more than US$10 billion was committed to investment in the sector. In conjunction with Kia Motors in August 2014, the president announced plans for Kia to build a US$1 billion factory in Nuevo León. At the time, Mercedes-Benz and Nissan were already building a US$1.4 billion plant near Puebla, while BMW was planning a US$1 billion assembly plant in San Luis Potosí. Audi began building a US$1.3 billion factory near Puebla in 2013. As of December 2014, two years into Peña Nieto's term, total investment in the auto sector in Mexico had reached US$19 billion. The Bajío Region has received the majority of this investment, and with its rapidly expanding aerospace industry has become the fastest-growing region in the country. In February 2014, Time was met with controversy for the release of a cover featuring Enrique Peña Nieto with the caption "Saving Mexico" (written by Michael Crowley), as the cover article's title inside the magazine. The controversial article praised the president and his cabinet for reforms like opening oil fields for foreign investment for the first time in 75 years (a reform towards which Mexican citizens have shown mixed feelings), ending the Mexican drug wars (which was not completely accurate), and even going as far as saying "the opposition party blocked major reforms that were necessary," that "American leaders could learn a thing or two from their resurgent southern neighbor" and saying Mexicans citizens' "alarms were replaced with applause."

According to the Mexican Social Security Institute (IMSS), between December 2012 and June 2016, more than two million jobs were created in Mexico. Women comprised 41% of those jobs, and individuals between 20 and 34 took 36%. IMSS also revealed that 86% were long-term jobs and 14% were temporary. These jobs have led to a 26% increase in revenue accumulation for IMSS, an additional MXN$50 billion. More than half a million jobs had salaries worth five minimum wages (about MXN$10,000 per month) and there was a 22% increase in jobs with salaries greater than 20 minimum wages.

==== Special economic zones ====
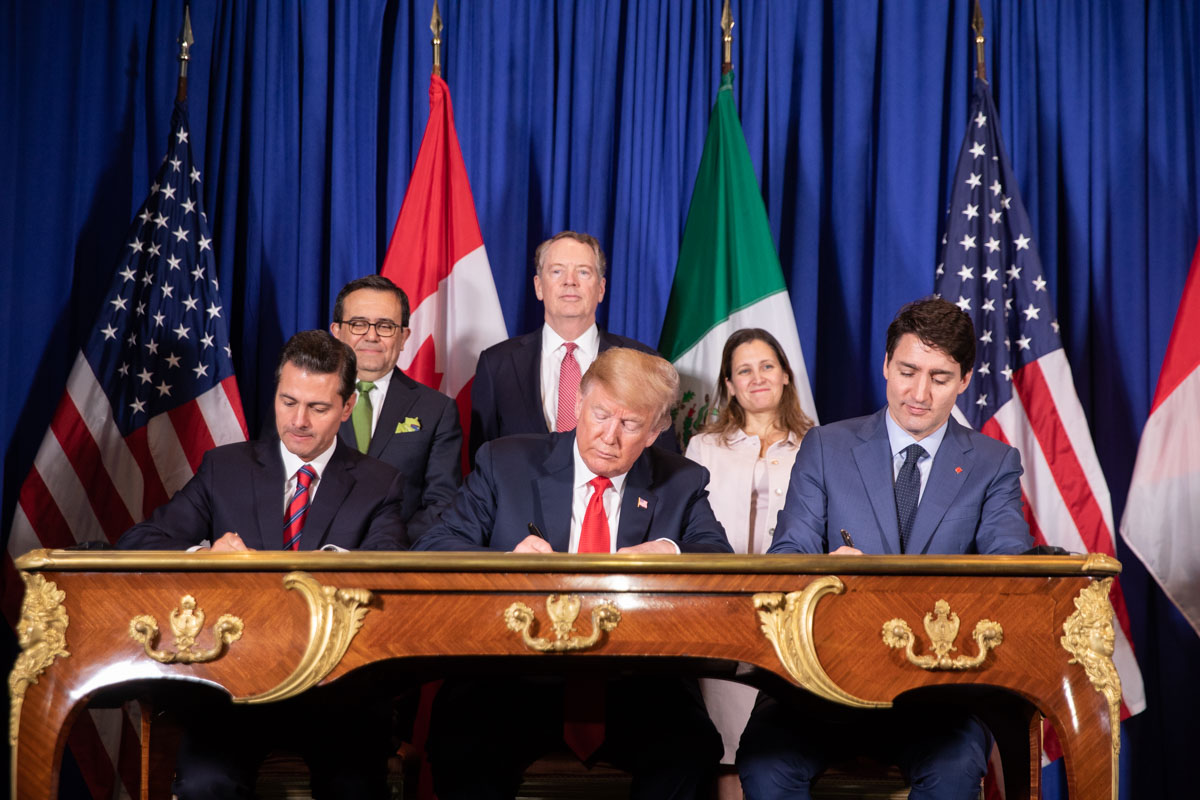
President Enrique Peña Nieto, President Donald Trump, and Prime Minister Justin Trudeau sign the USMCA agreement during the G20 summit in Buenos Aires, Argentina, on 30 November 2018.

At the end of May 2016, Peña Nieto signed a law to create special economic zones in economically depressed southern states. The first three are Lázaro Cárdenas, Michoacán; Port Chiapas, Chiapas; and in the Isthmus of Tehuantepec to better join the ports of Coatzacoalcos, Veracruz and Salina Cruz, Oaxaca. Another zone in the petroleum region of Tabasco and Campeche, hit by the downturn in the oil industry, is planned for 2017.

The special economic zones are meant to alleviate the lack of industry in the South. During the signing, Peña Nieto highlighted the difference between the South and the industrial North and Center of Mexico: two of every three people in extreme poverty in Mexico live in the southern states. While the three poorest states (Chiapas, Oaxaca, and Guerrero) have about 10% of the population, they receive just $1 of every $36 in foreign direct investment in the country. He went on to say that there are two Mexicos: one "that competes and wins in the global economy, with growing levels of income, development and well-being." At the same time, the other Mexico "has been left behind [and] hasn't been able to take advantage of its potential."

The special economic zones will offer tax incentives (exemption from the 16% VAT), trade and customs benefits, and the streamlining of regulatory processes. There will also be an increase in infrastructure spending in these regions. Private administrators will run the zones on 40-year contracts (managing infrastructure and attracting tenants). According to Peña Nieto, at the latest, each of these zones will have an anchor tenant that will attract suppliers and other industries in the supply chain by 2018. The World Bank advised Mexico during the formulation of the special economic zones plan.

=== Domestic policy ===
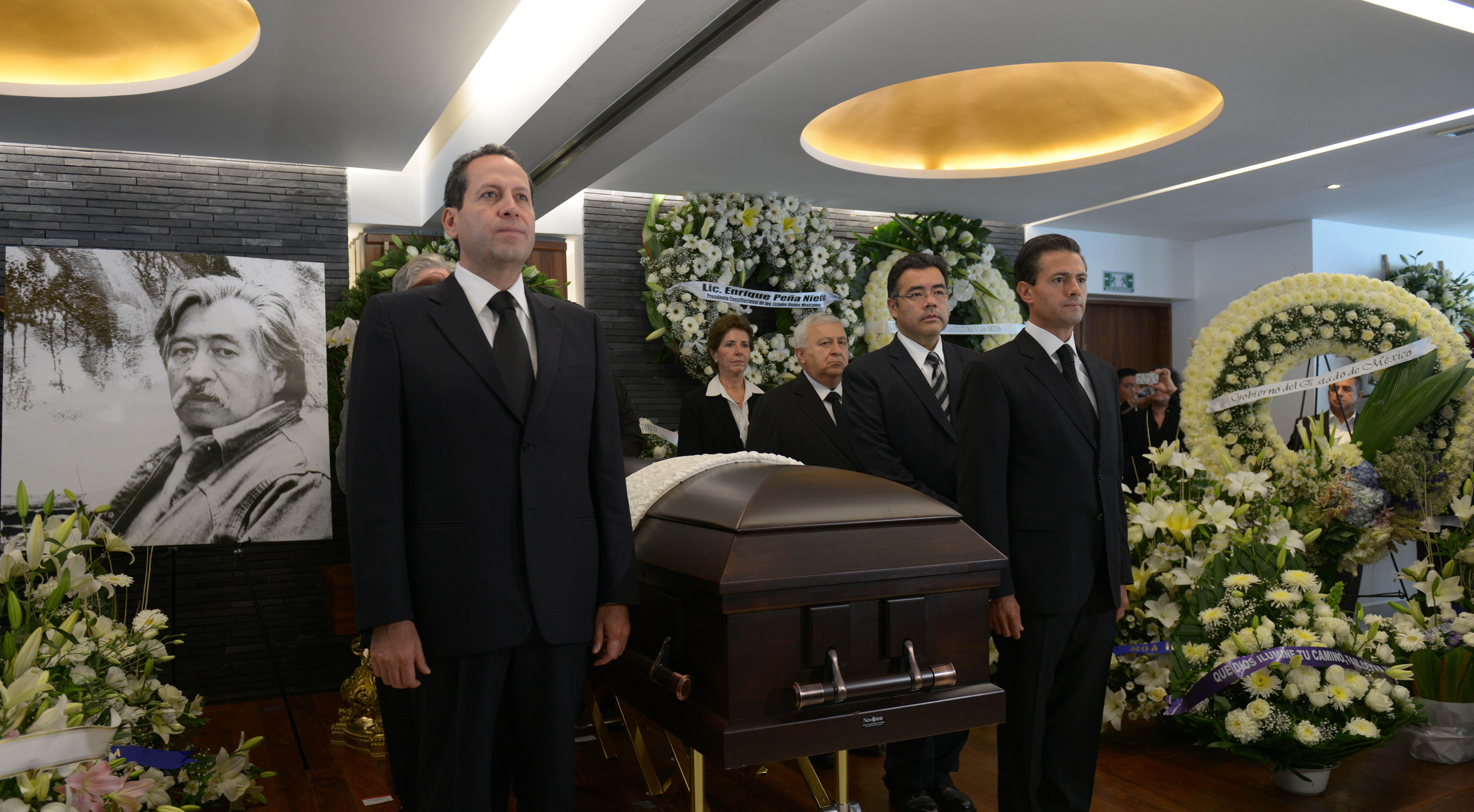
Funeral of Luis Nishizawa, President Enrique Peña Nieto (right) attended to pay respects to the painter.

Peña Nieto enacted a public education reform that aimed to curb the powerful teachers' union, Sindicato Nacional de Trabajadores de la Educación (SNTE), improve standards, centralize the process for hiring, evaluating, promoting, and retaining teachers, and crack down on corruption – such as wages for non-existent "ghost teachers". Five years after its signing, the plan has barely affected standards: Mexico still ranks last in education among the 35 Organisation for Economic Co-operation and Development countries and the Secretariat of Public Education spent more money on communications (2,700% more on communications in 2017 than was budgeted) than on teacher training.

=== Security policy ===
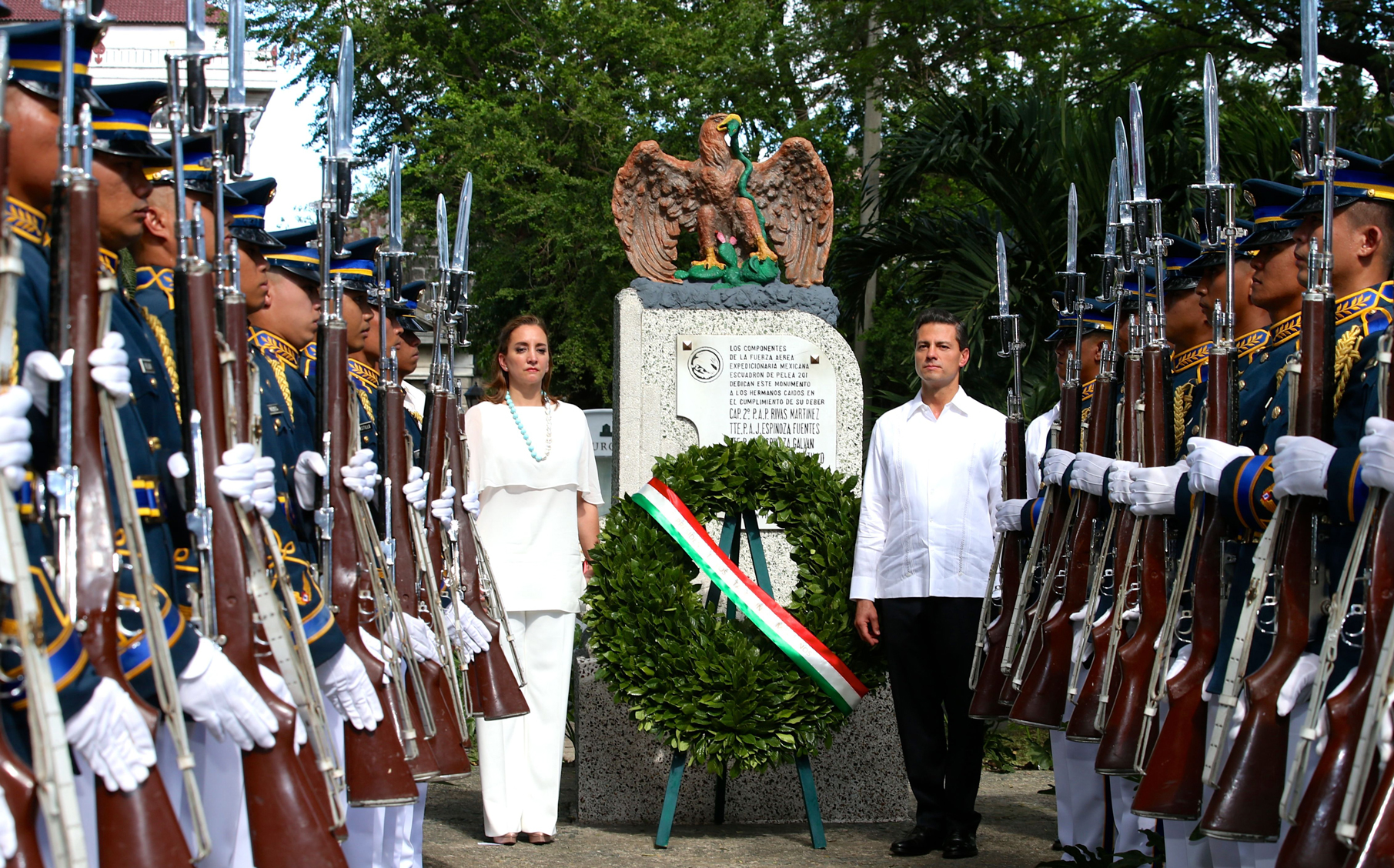
President Enrique Peña Nieto and Secretary of Foreign Affairs Claudia Ruiz Massieu visit the monument to the 201st Fighter Squadron in Manila, November 2015.

While campaigning, Peña Nieto appointed a former general of the National Police of Colombia as his external advisor for public security and promised to reduce the murder rate in Mexico by 50% by the end of his six-year term. Critics of Peña Nieto's security strategy, however, said that he offered "little sense" in exactly how he will reduce the violence. During the three-month campaign, Peña Nieto was not explicit on his anti-crime strategy, and many analysts wondered whether he was holding back politically sensitive details or simply did not know how he would attempt to squelch the violence and carry out the next stage in Mexico's drug war. United States officials were worried that the election of Peña Nieto's Institutional Revolutionary Party may mean a return to the old PRI tactics of "corruption [and] backroom deals" with the cartels in exchange for bribes and relative peace.

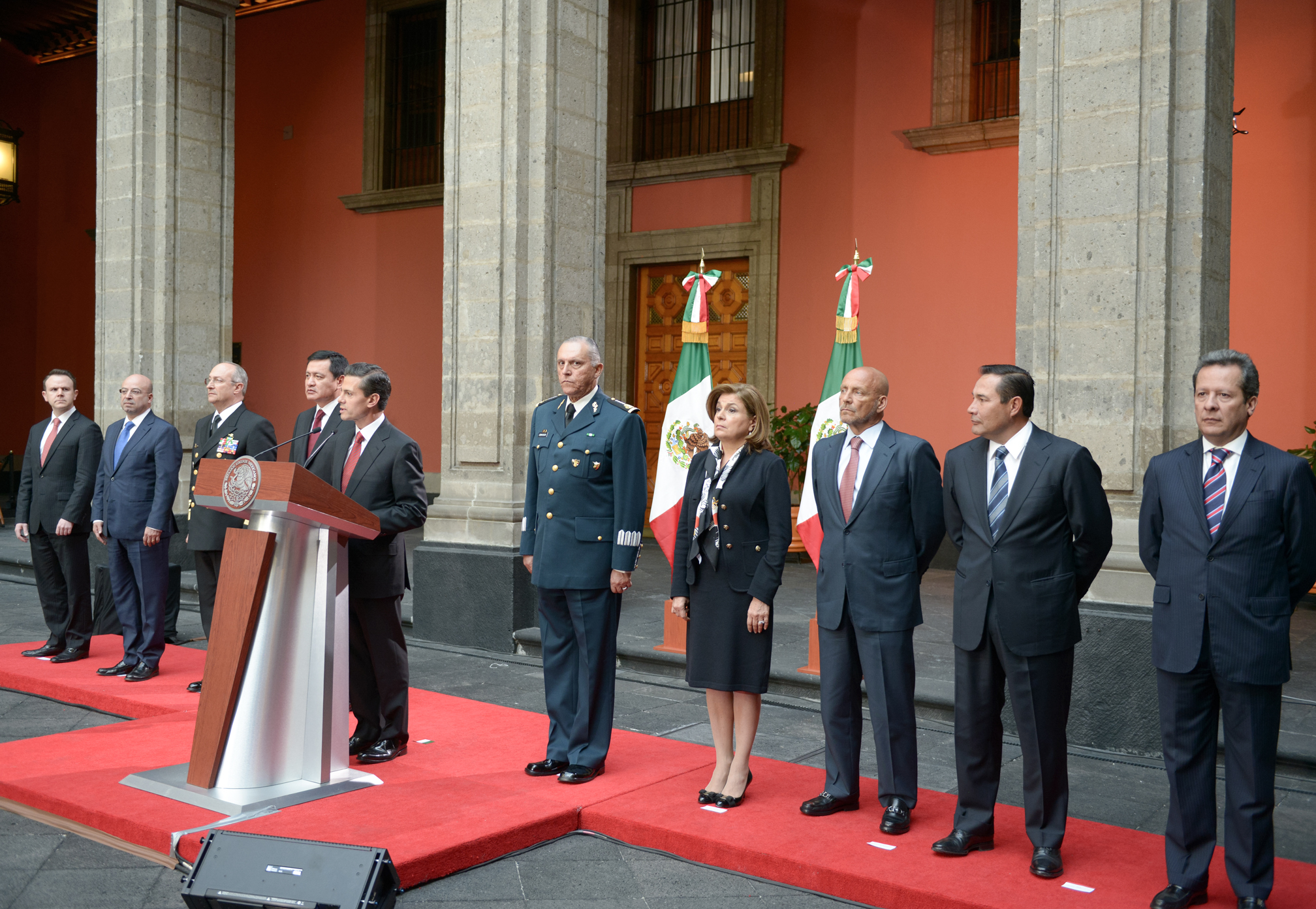
President Enrique Peña Nieto, accompanied by Cabinet members, holds a press conference in the Palacio Nacional announcing the capture of Joaquín Guzmán.

In 2012, the president-elect emphasized that he did not support the involvement or presence of armed United States agents in Mexico but considered allowing the United States to instruct Mexico's military training in counterinsurgency tactics. Beyond that, Peña Nieto promised that the States would take no other measures in Mexico.

The security policy of Peña Nieto prioritized the reduction of violence rather than attacking Mexico's drug-trafficking organizations head-on, marking a departure from the strategy of the previous six years during Felipe Calderón's administration. One of the biggest contrasts is the focus on lowering murder rates, kidnappings, and extortions, as opposed to arresting or killing the country's most-wanted drug lords and intercepting their shipments.

On 13 December 2012, a law that included far-reaching security reforms was approved. Mexico's Interior Ministry, greatly strengthened by the bill, was solely responsible for public security. Part of Peña Nieto's strategy consists of the creation of a national police of 40,000 members, known as a "gendarmerie." The Economist reported that the gendarmerie would have an initial strength of 10,000. Still, the Washington Office on Latin America reported that it was reduced to 5,000 members and would not be operational until July 2014. The Interior Ministry announced that 15 specialized police units were being formed to exclusively focus on major crimes that include kidnapping and extortion, along with a new task force dedicated to tracking missing persons. Peña Nieto also proposed centralizing the sub-federal police forces under one command.

In December 2017, the Law of Internal Security was passed by legislation. Still, it was met with criticism, especially from the National Human Rights Commission, accusing it of giving the President a blank check.

=== Energy policy ===
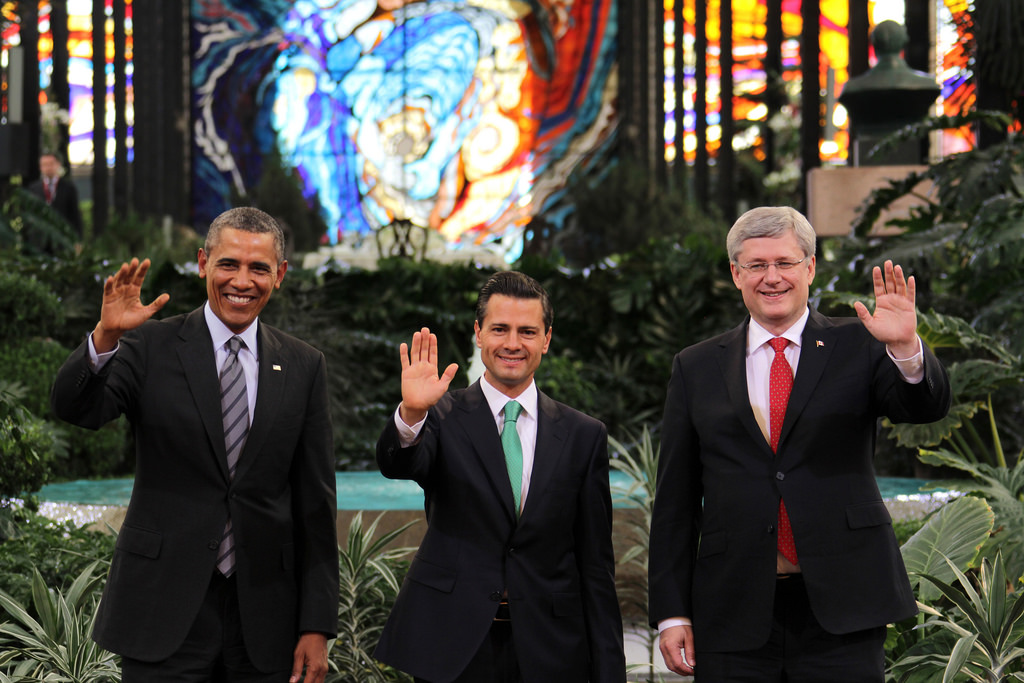
NAFTA leaders U.S. President Barack Obama, Mexican President Peña Nieto, and Canadian Prime Minister Stephen Harper, 2014.

During the presidential campaign, Peña Nieto promised to allow private investment in Pemex, Mexico's state-owned oil company. He also indicated interest in an economic agreement with Petrobras, Brazil's oil company. By liberalizing Pemex, investors say Peña Nieto's proposal could allow joint ventures and private investment in the oil company.

According to the Financial Times in 2012, Peña Nieto's PRI government, which held just over 38% of the votes in Congress, might have difficulty gaining a majority to pass such reforms, or the two-thirds majority needed to change the Mexican constitution. Pemex was founded through the nationalization of foreign oil interests, and the Mexican constitution bans major outside investments. Changing Pemex could transform the psychology of Mexico's business sector and involve cultural and political changes that cannot be rushed. President Lázaro Cárdenas led the expropriation of foreign oil company assets in 1938 to form Pemex, which has served as a symbol of national identity.

Eric Martin of Bloomberg News stated that if Peña Nieto wants to invite investment, he must face the challenges of union leaders and local officials who have benefited from the oil company's bonanza. Productivity in Pemex has been declined in the 2000s. Peña Nieto declared while campaigning that overhauling Pemex will be the PRI's and his "signature issue," and that he will encourage private companies to invest in exploration and development activities. Following Peña Nieto's hike in the price of gasoline as a result of his privatization of the Mexican oil industry, protests erupted nationwide. Protestors blockaded major highways, forced the closing of foreign borders, and shut down gas stations.

=== Foreign policy ===
==== 2016 visit by Donald Trump ====
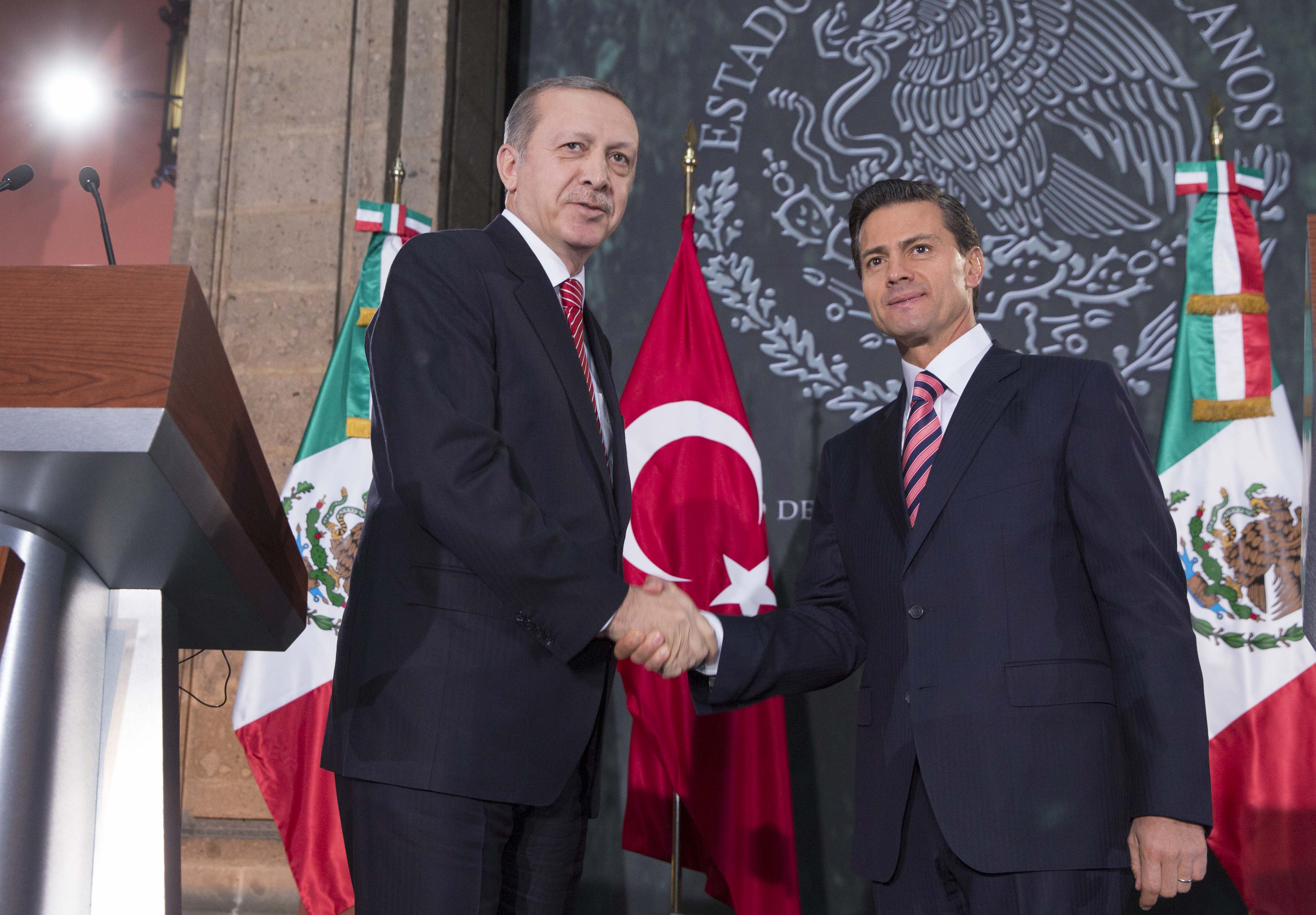
Peña Nieto with Turkish president Recep Tayyip Erdoğan, February 2015

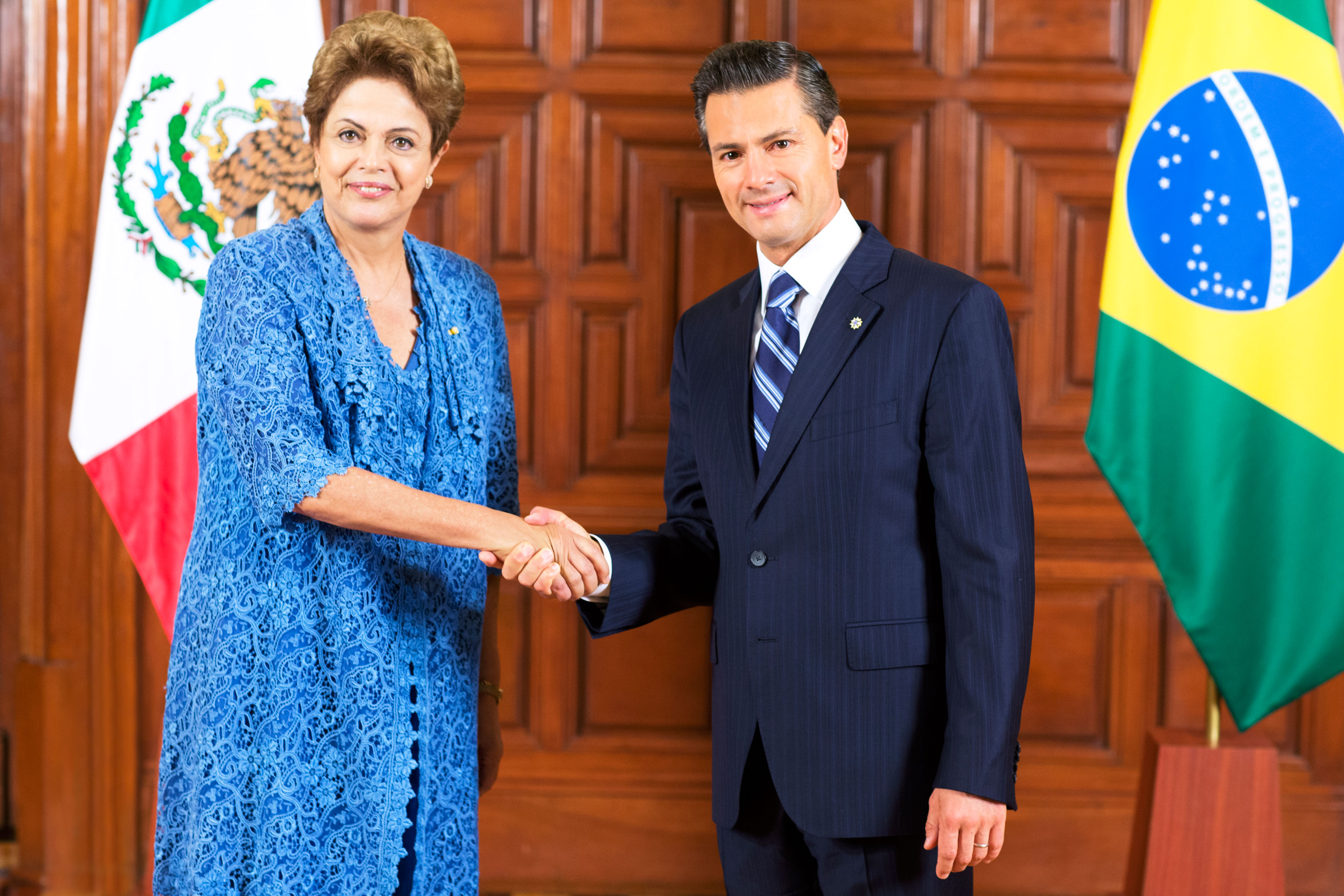
Peña Nieto with Brazilian president Dilma Rousseff, May 2015

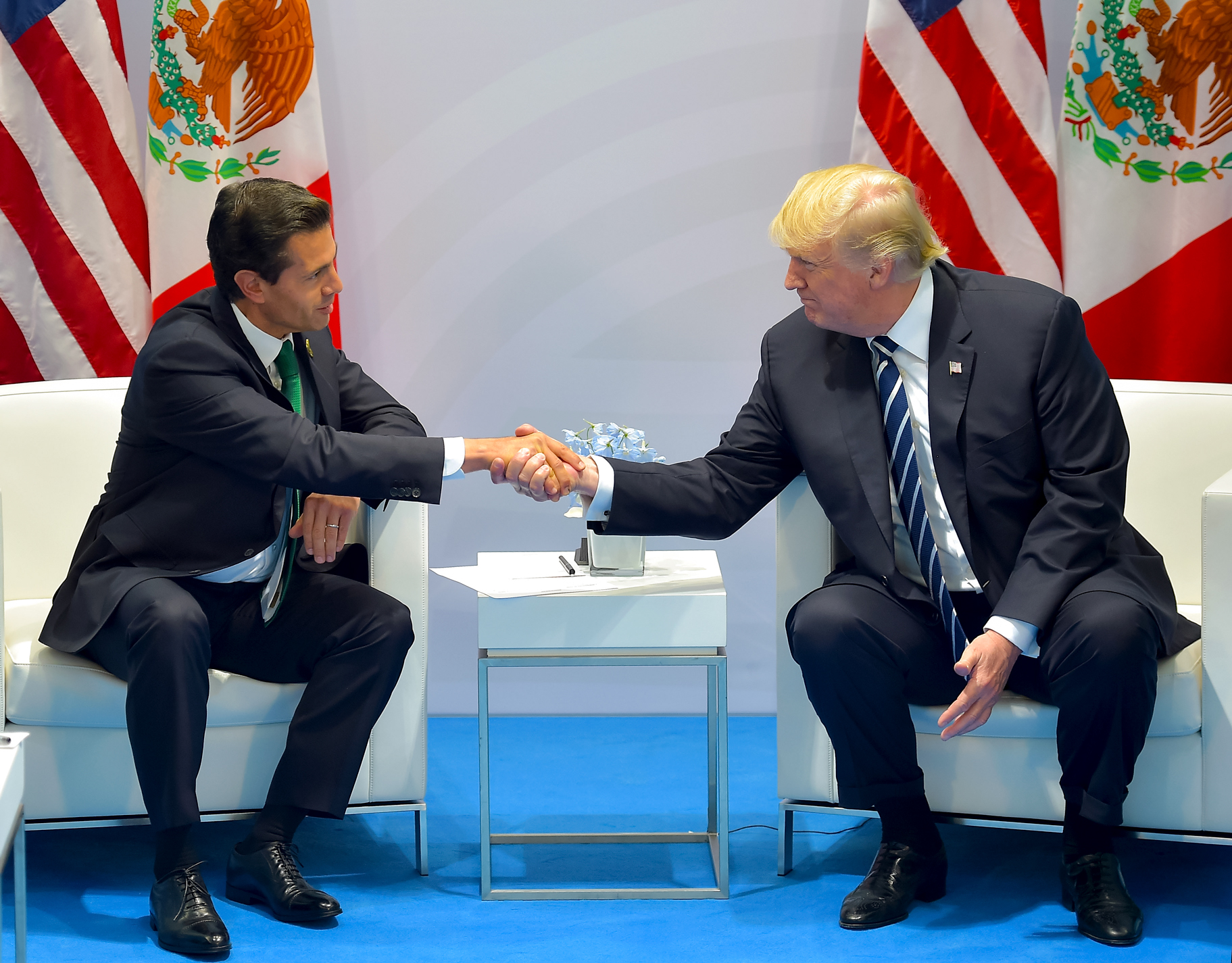
Peña Nieto meets with U.S. president Donald Trump at the G20 Hamburg summit, July 2017

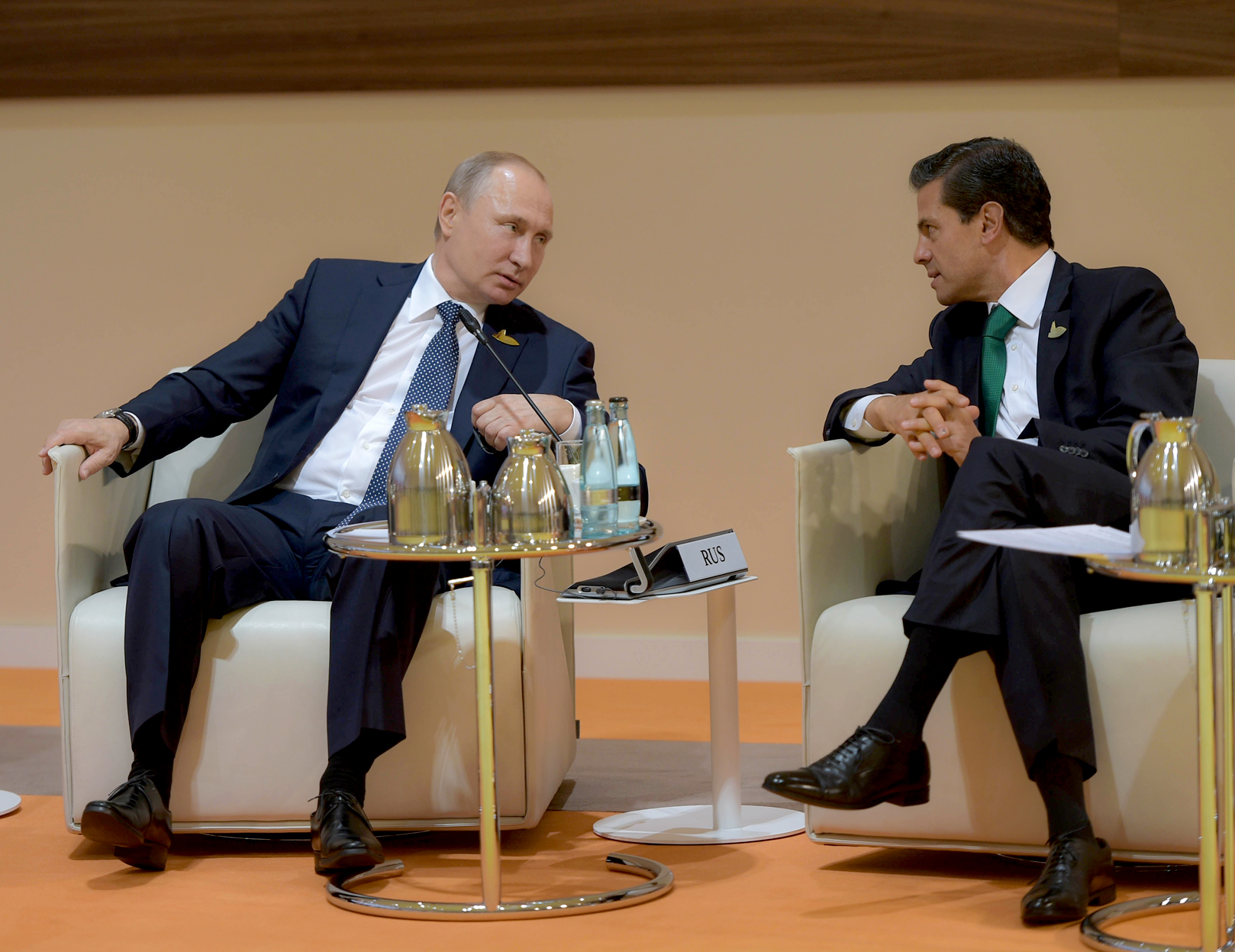
Peña Nieto with Russian President Vladimir Putin in 2017

Peña Nieto invited U.S. Republican presidential candidate Donald Trump to visit on 31 August 2016 and appeared with him in a press conference. Peña Nieto was criticized for extending the invitation to Trump, and following the conference, journalist Jorge Ramos criticized Peña Nieto for not using the opportunity to publicly contradict Trump's campaign promise to make Mexico pay for his proposed Mexico–United States border wall, as well as what Ramos called, Trump's "attacks on Latin American immigrants, his rejection of free trade agreements and his scorn for global organizations." Despite this, Peña Nieto stated on his Twitter that he made it clear to Trump that Mexico would not pay for the wall, only to shortly after get a reply from Donald Trump falsely saying: "Mexico will pay for the wall!"

==== Trump's presidency and border wall ====
Peña Nieto and Trump were to meet on 26 January 2017, until Trump wrote on his Twitter account: "If Mexico is unwilling to pay for the badly needed wall, then it would be better to cancel the upcoming meeting." This directly led Peña Nieto to cancel his visit to the U.S. president. In an interview with Aristegui Noticias, Washington-based freelance journalist Dolia Estévez said she obtained access to part of a one-hour phone conversation between the two presidents the day of the scheduled meeting. She stated, "Trump humiliated Peña Nieto" and said the conversation only lasted 20 minutes. She also explained that the speech was prolonged to an hour due to translation efforts because Trump does not speak Spanish and likewise Peña Nieto does not understand English. While many media outlets praised Peña Nieto for canceling the visit with Trump, Forbes Mexico stated that despite showing support toward Peña Nieto for canceling such an event, "that shouldn't translate in forgiveness to what happens within our country [Mexico]" adding that "a state incapable of bringing credibility and stability could not grow", and that more than Trump, the thing keeping Mexico from prosperity was the corruption within the Mexican government.

=== Controversies ===
==== Publicity and public image ====
As of July 2017, Oxford University's Computational Propaganda Research Project claimed Mexico's social media manipulation (Peñabots) to come directly from the Mexican government itself.

A December 2017 article in The New York Times reported Enrique Peña Nieto spent about 2 billion dollars on publicity during his first five years as president, the largest publicity budget ever spent by a Mexican President.

==== Iguala mass kidnapping ====
In September 2014, 43 male college students were forcibly taken and then disappeared in Guerrero. The forced mass disappearance of the students arguably became the biggest political and public security scandal Peña Nieto faced during his administration. It led to nationwide protests and international condemnation, particularly in Guerrero and Mexico City.

==== Freedom of the press ====
During his tenure as president, Peña Nieto has been accused of failing to protect journalists, whose deaths have been speculated to be politically triggered by officials attempting to prevent coverage of scandals. On 29 April 2017, The New York Times published a news report titled "In Mexico, 'It's Easy to Kill a Journalist,'" which covered the high rate of deaths and disappearances of journalists in Mexico and declared Mexico had become "one of the worst countries in the world to be a journalist today."

In November 2014, an article was published by journalist Carmen Aristegui, indicating that a $7 million "White House" owned by Enrique Peña Nieto and his wife Angelica Rivera, in Lomas de Chapultepec was registered under the name of a company affiliated with a business group that had received government contracts to build a bullet train. The revelation of the potential conflict of interest in the acquisition of the house aggravated discontent about the government. Rivera released a video detailing her income as a former soap opera actress, stating that she was selling the house and that the property was not under her name because she had not made the full payment yet. She later deleted the video. Shortly after revealing the Mexican White House incident, Carmen Aristegui was controversially fired from her radio show at MVS Communications. As noted by The New York Times, Aristegui being fired was perceived as censorship toward news journalism and freedom of speech. Aristegui took it to trial and by June 2018, three years after MVS fired her, the jury determined that it was indeed unconstitutional and against the law, to fire her and indeed was an act of censorship towards the freedom of speech. Peña Nieto's successor in the presidency of Mexico, Andres Manuel López Obrador, promised Aristegui would be free to return to radio if she wanted and that there would be no more unfair censorship towards the freedom of speech.

On 19 June 2017, The New York Times, in conjunction with Carmen Aristegui and Televisa news reporter Carlos Loret de Mola, reported that the Mexican government had used the Pegasus spyware to surveil targets such as reporters, human rights leaders, and anti-corruption activists using text messages as lures. From 2011 to 2017, the Mexican government spent $80 million on spyware. Pegasus infiltrates a person's cell phone and reports on their messages, e-mails, contacts, and calendars.

In 2016, Aristegui revealed in a special report arguing that Enrique Peña Nieto had committed plagiarism in his law thesis, at least a third of it, with 197 out of 682 paragraphs being unsourced or wrongly sourced works.

==== Allegations of corruption ====
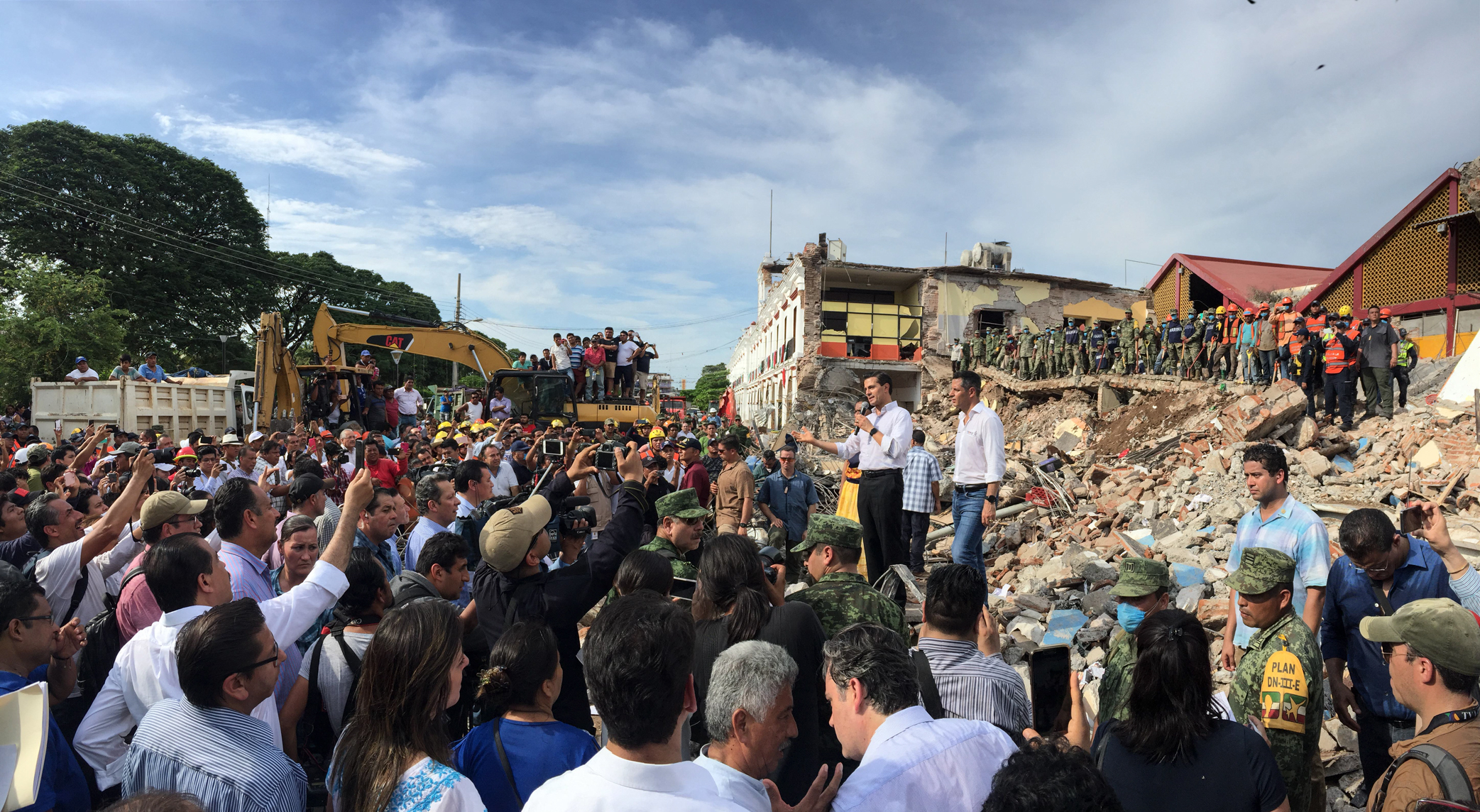
The president of Mexico, Enrique Peña Nieto, visit Juchitán, after the 2017 Chiapas earthquake.

In October 2017, Santiago Nieto Castillo, the head of the Office for Election-related Crimes (FEPADE), was controversially removed from office, shortly after opening an investigation into illicit campaign money during the 2012 presidential campaign, received by Peña Nieto and would be president of Pemex, Emilio Lozoya Austin from the Brazilian conglomerate Odebrecht. In December 2017, The New York Times published accusations that Peña Nieto's government was blocking investigations against public corruption, with a commissioner saying the government was preventing the establishment of an impartial leader in FEPADE. 22 ex-governors, all members of the PRI, were investigated for corruption with five jailed.

In March 2018, during the campaign period for the 2018 presidential election, the Prosecutor General's Office (PGR) opened an investigation into the PAN's candidate, Ricardo Anaya, for money laundering. Santiago Nieto said that the accusations toward Anaya were minor in comparison to the Odebrecht and Peña Nieto scandal, as well as the SEDESOL scandal (in which 435 million pesos were lost) or the corruption amongst governors from the PRI such as Javier Duarte and César Duarte Jáquez (both who were later arrested). Santiago Nieto further charged that the PGR and FEPADE were not being neutral and were instead being used as tools by Peña Nieto's government to tamper with the upcoming election, by investigating Anaya, a political opponent, and not José Antonio Meade, a political ally.

In an interview with The Wall Street Journal, Santiago Nieto would later reveal that Peña Nieto's government tried to bribe him to keep him silent, which he refused by saying, "Sorry, but I can't receive any money from Peña Nieto." He subsequently received threatening calls with the words "Death follows you" and "Words of advice: stay out of Trouble."

The Brazilian conglomerate Odebrecht, which is accused of corruption and bribes throughout Latin America, is under investigation for allegedly overriding Peña Nieto's presidential campaign with illegal campaign funds. In exchange for campaign funds, the Peña Nieto administration allegedly granted contracts to Odebrecht through state-owned Pemex. An Odebrecht employee told a Brazilian court that he had been asked to pay a bribe to Lozoya, then head of Pemex. In March 2018, PRI legislators voted to stop the investigation into Odebrecht, which drew criticism. The investigation against Emilio Loyoza, then-head of Pemex, was also controversially ceased after a judge ordered it days later.

While in office, Peña Nieto invoked two constitutional rights related to prosecution: amparo and fuero. Amparo gives anyone accused of a crime the right to know which crimes they are being accused of; it is mostly used by people expecting to go to trial and allows the prosecuted person to build a defense with the help of a lawyer. Fuero protects political figures from prosecution committed during their time in office, in effect delaying any investigations against him until the end of their terms. Peña Nieto is the first Mexican president to invoke either right.

In 2020, Lozoya was detained by the Mexican government. In his trial statements, he testified against Peña Nieto and Luis Videgaray (the former Minister of Finance during Peña's government). He detailed that following Peña's orders, he acted as the middle-man between Peña Nieto and Odebrecht, stating that Peña Nieto's presidential campaign benefited from illegal campaign funds provided by Odebrecht in exchange for future favors. According to the triangulation investigations that proved Lozoya guilty, he received $10 million from Odebrecht. During his trial, Lozoya described the payments for facilitating the exchange as a middle-man. Lozoya and Videgaray are featured prominently in spots from the 2012 presidential campaign. Mexican journalist Carlos Loret de Mola described being contacted by Peña Nieto's state, and being told the former president described himself as "unaware of Lozoya's corruption". Loret de Mola also said Peña Nieto was already in contact with his successor, Andres Manuel López Obrador, to declare his version of the events. Loret de Mola said that Peña Nieto was "going to get lost within his lies" during the trial.

On November 12, 2020, the Attorney General's Office (FGR) officially accused Peña Nieto of being a "traitor to the country and of electoral fraud due to the Odebrecht scandal" along with Lozoya and Videgaray.

During United States of America v. Joaquín Guzmán Loera, Guzmán's lawyer alleged that the Sinaloa drug cartel had paid "hundreds of millions of dollars" in bribes to Peña Nieto and his predecessor, Felipe Calderón; both presidents denied the claims, with Peña Nieto's spokesman calling the claims "completely false and defamatory." Alex Cifuentes, who described himself as Guzmán's "right-hand man", later testified that Peña Nieto originally asked for $250 million before settling on $100 million.

==== Allegations of crimes against humanity ====
In 2016, a report by the Open Justice Society Initiative claimed that there are "reasonable grounds" to believe that both the Mexican army and drug cartels had committed crimes against humanity during the Mexican drug war. The report accused both Peña Nieto and his predecessor, Felipe Calderón, of "almost completely failing" to ensure accountability for the actions of the Mexican army and of denying or minimizing the scale of the atrocities. In June 2018, human rights organizations presented documents alleging slayings, tortures, rapes, and forced disappearances to the International Criminal Court, and called on them to investigate.

== Public image ==
=== Media gaffes ===
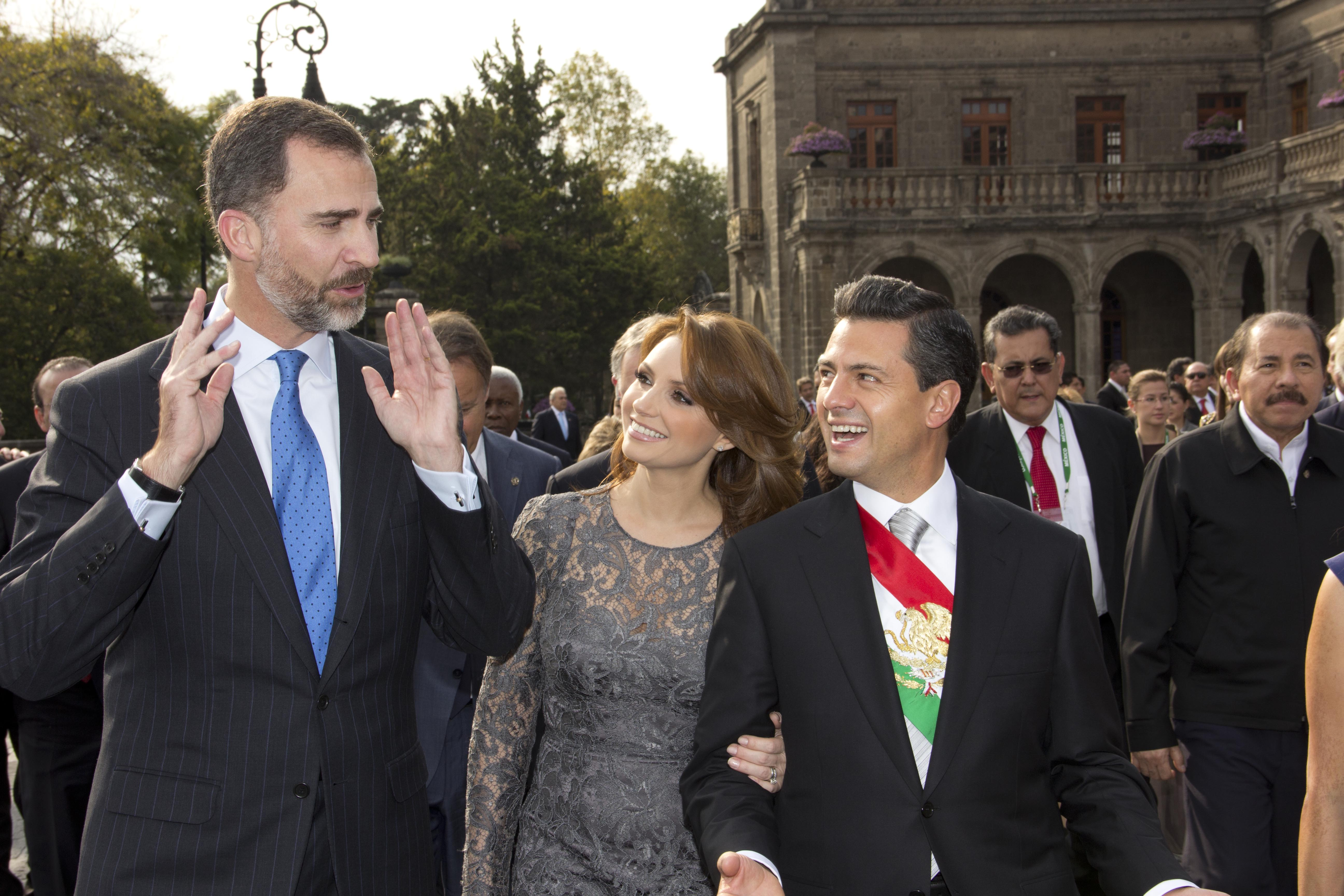
Enrique Peña Nieto and Angélica Rivera with Spanish Prince (now King Felipe VI) in 2012

Peña Nieto is known for his occasional lapses in memory and gaffes during public events and interviews. The most-noted incident occurred during the International Book Fair of Guadalajara on 3 December 2011. On that day, during a question and answer session, he was asked by an audience member to name three books that had influenced him, being only able to correctly reference the Bible. He then "rambled, tossing out confused title names, asking for help in recalling authors and sometimes mismatching" the two others. Other incidents have involved him not being able to recall Benito Juárez's year of birth, being unable to remember the acronym of the Federal Institute of Access to Information (IFAI), changing the date of foundation of the state of Hidalgo, mistaking the capital of the State of Veracruz, mentioning the U.S. presidential candidate "La señora Hillary Trump" (Mrs. Hillary Trump), among others, of varying degree of substantiation or credibility. These have gone viral on social media, especially Twitter and a website that counts the number of days since his last gaffe.

=== Allegations of media bias ===
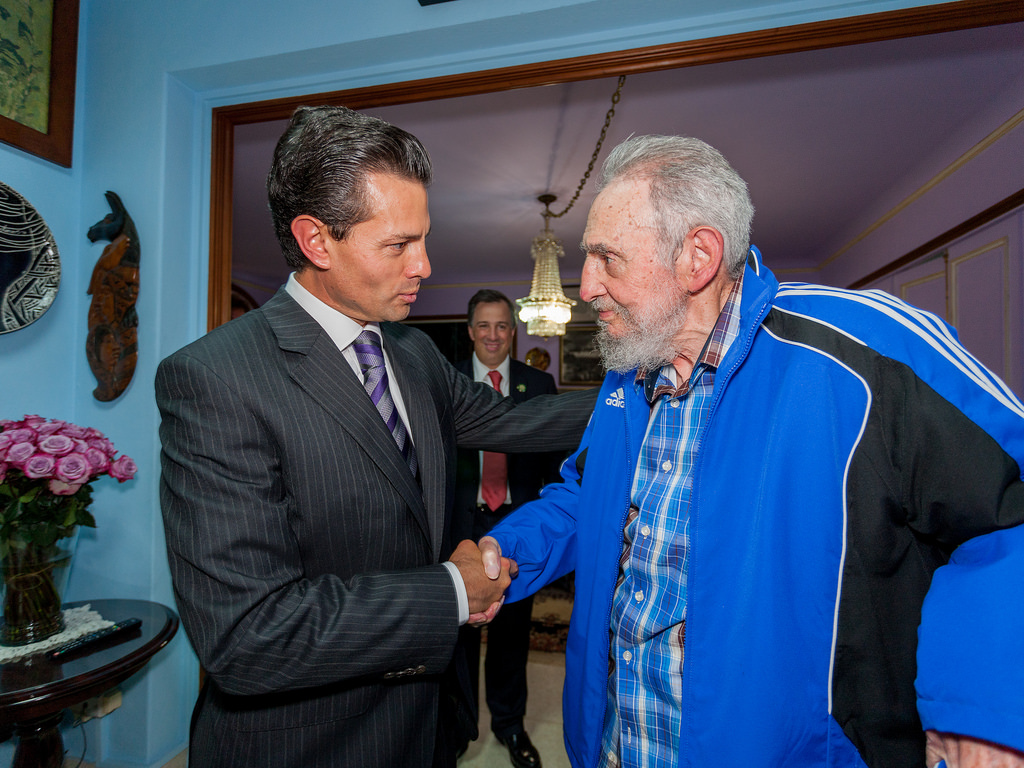
President Enrique Peña Nieto meets with former Cuban President Fidel Castro in La Habana

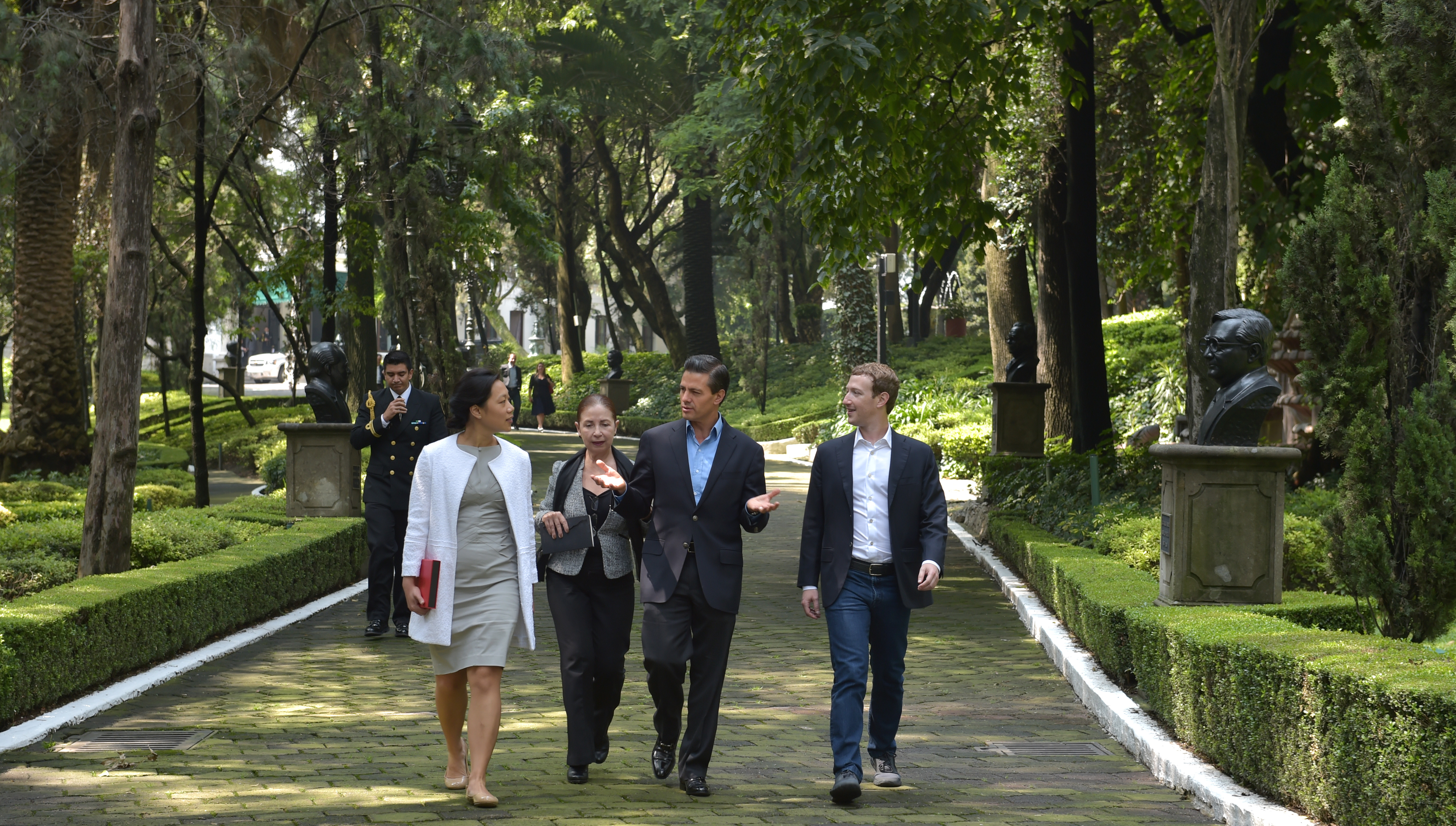
Mark Zuckerberg and Priscilla Chan in the gardens of Los Pinos during a visit in September 2014.

Televisa

Televisa, the largest conglomerate broadcasting in Mexico and other Spanish-speaking countries, was accused of tilting their coverage towards Peña Nieto ahead of the 1 July vote. Thousands of students protested of the perceived bias throughout Mexico City and other cities.

On 7 June 2018, The Guardian's Jo Tuckman reported about dozens of computer files – forwarded to The Guardian by a source who worked with Televisa, but it has not been possible to confirm the authenticity of the documents – suggesting that Televisa sold favorable coverage to Peña Nieto when he was governor of the state of Mexico and developed a smear campaign against López Obrador ahead of his first bid for the presidency in 2006. Televisa and the PRI suggested that the documents were false.

Time magazine

On the 24 March 2014 issue of the newsweekly Time, Peña Nieto was on the front cover with the caption, "Saving Mexico." The front cover was met with widespread disapproval from the Mexican public, prompting various spoofs on social media, even prompting a petition to have him removed from the cover.

=== Evaluations as president and legacy ===
In August 2016, Peña Nieto's approval ratings dropped to 23 percent (74 percent said they disapproved of his performance), which newspaper Reforma revealed to be the lowest approval rating for a president since they began polling in 1995. The approval decreased to 12% by 19 January 2017.

The lack of popularity and credibility of Peña Nieto's government is perceived to have caused the PRI to suffer a significant defeat in the 2018 Mexican general election, where the party received the lowest vote percentage in its history. The party's presidential candidate, José Antonio Meade, did not win a majority in Mexico's 300 voting locations, while the PRI was also defeated in the nine gubernatorial elections. The presidency of Mexico went to Andrés Manuel López Obrador (from MORENA), who won in a landslide. The PRI also lost to MORENA in Atlacomulco, the hometown of Enrique Peña Nieto.

In 2020, López Obrador asked Mexicans if they would like to see former presidents face trial for allegations of corruption. According to a survey conducted by El Universal, 78% of Mexicans wanted the former presidents to face trial, with Peña Nieto the one they wanted to be incarcerated the most.

=== In popular culture ===
The 2014 Mexican comedy and political satire movie The Perfect Dictatorship had a plot based on the real-life perceived Televisa controversy, which consisted of Mexican citizens heavily perceiving the news media as unfairly favoring PRI candidate Enrique Peña Nieto during the 2012 presidential election in Mexico.

== Personal life ==
=== Family life ===
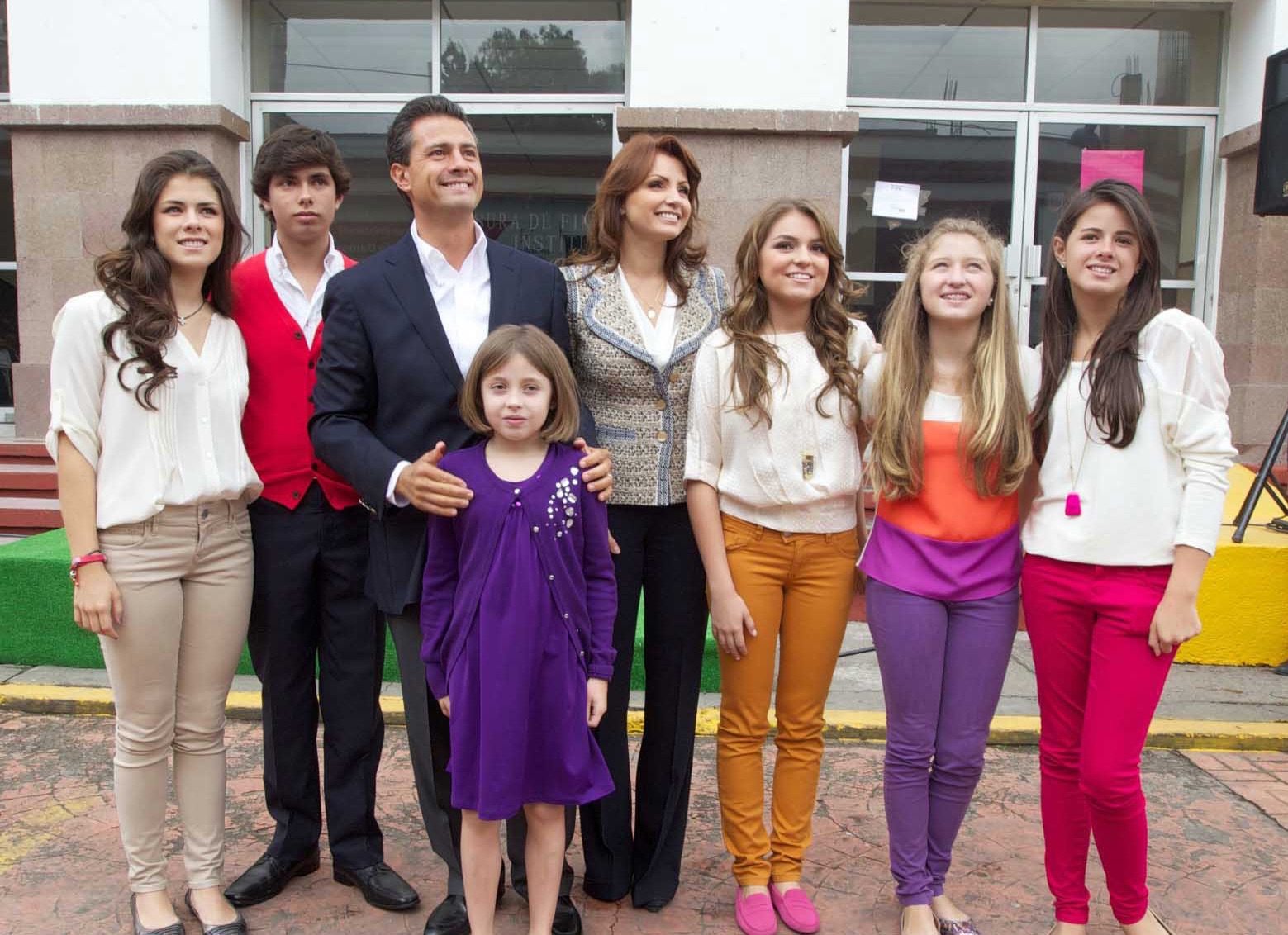
Peña Nieto with family in Atlacomulco on the 2012 election day.

In 1993, Peña Nieto married his first wife, Mónica Pretelini (1965–2007). The couple had three children. Peña Nieto had two children outside his first marriage. Pretelini died on 11 January 2007 as the result of an epileptic episode. Pretelini played a supporting role during the campaign of Peña Nieto's governorship. In 2008, Peña Nieto began a relationship with Televisa soap opera actress Angélica Rivera, whom he had hired to help publicize his political campaign for the State of Mexico. The couple married in November 2010. After his tenure as president ended, Rivera announced their divorce on 8 February 2019. Peña Nieto began dating Mexican model Tania Ruiz Eichelmann weeks after his separation with Rivera. He and Eichelmann lived together in Madrid; in January 2023 they announced that they broke up.

Peña Nieto is the cousin of Alfredo del Mazo Maza, who was the governor of the State of Mexico from 2017 to 2023, of which his grandfather, father, distant uncle Arturo Montiel, as well as himself, have previously been governors.

=== Ancestry ===
Ancestors of Enrique Peña Nieto

16. Sotero Peña García
8. Eleuterio Severiano Peña López
17. María Rosalía Victoriana López Mejía
4. Francisco Javier Arturo Peña Arcos
18. Eufemio Arcos Valdés
9. Juana Arcos Colín
19. Juana Rafaela Valvina Colín González
2. Gilberto Enrique Peña del Mazo
20. Galo del Mazo y Conde
10. Pedro del Mazo Villasante
21. María de las Mercedes Villasante y Pliego
5. María de los Dolores del Mazo Vélez
22. Antonio Vélez Flores
11. Josefa Vélez Díaz
23. María Marta Julita Margarita Díaz Ortega
1. Enrique Peña Nieto
24. Remigio Nieto Garduño
12. Marcelino Ruperto Nieto Giménez
25. Marta Jiménez Monroy
6. Constantino Enrique Nieto Montiel
26. León Cleofás Antonio Montiel Bermúdez
13. Epigmenia Luz Lina (or Epigmenia Lina de la Luz) Montiel Sánchez
27. María Evarista Simona Sánchez García
3. María del Socorro Ofelia Nieto Sánchez
28. José Vidal Anastacio Sánchez Guadarrama
14. Juan Silvano Sánchez Lovera
29. María Mauricia Matiana Lovera Valdez
7. Ofelia Sánchez Colín
30. José María Colín Herrera
15. María de los Remedios Antonia Colín Pérez
31. María Feliciana Úrsula de Jesús Pérez Cárdenas

== Honors ==
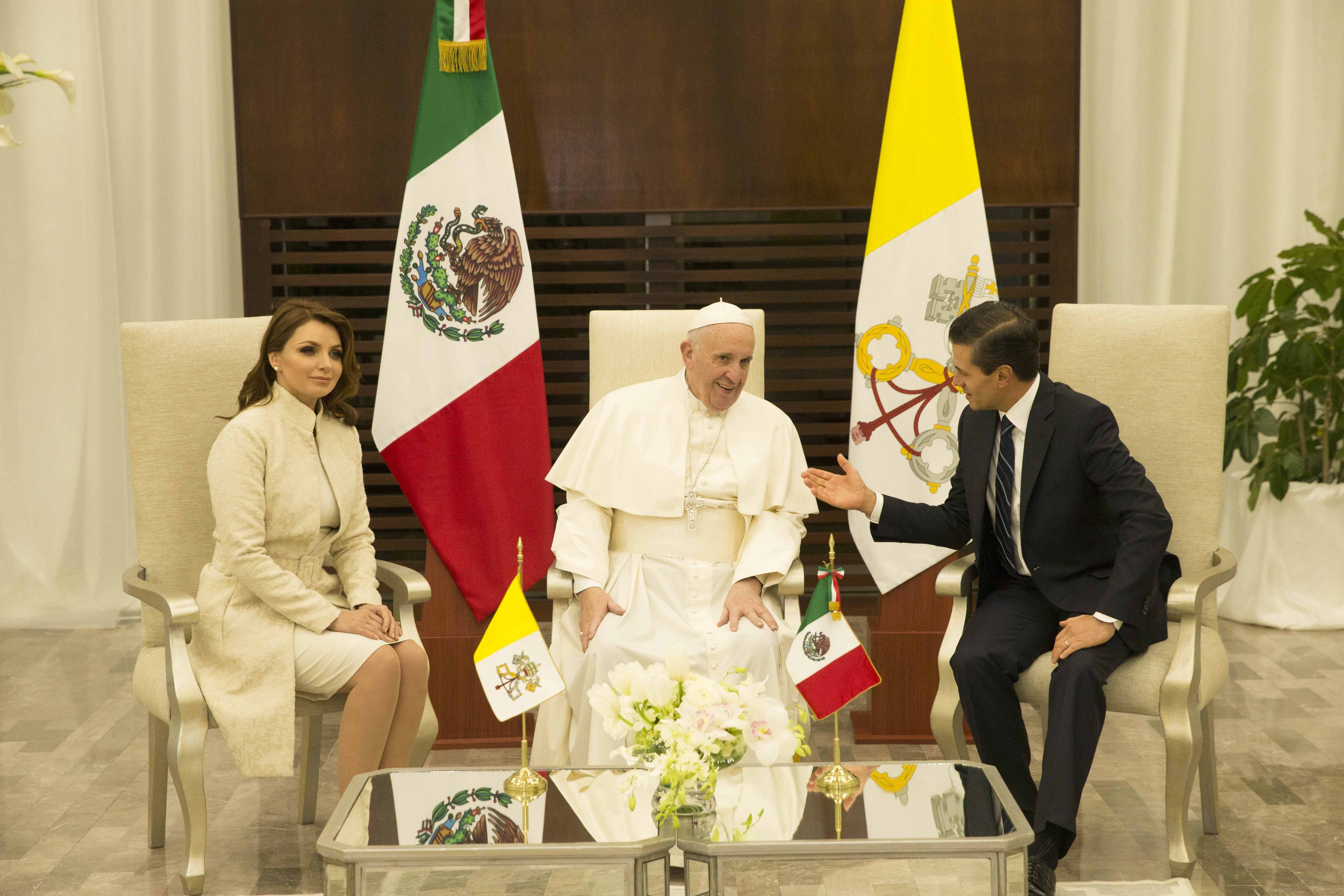
Pope Francis and President Enrique Peña Nieto, accompanied by First Lady Angélica Rivera, held a meeting in the premises of the Presidential hangar following the Pope's arrival in Mexico.

=== National honors ===
- (Mexico) : Collar of the Order of the Aztec Eagle (1° December 2012)

=== Foreign honors ===
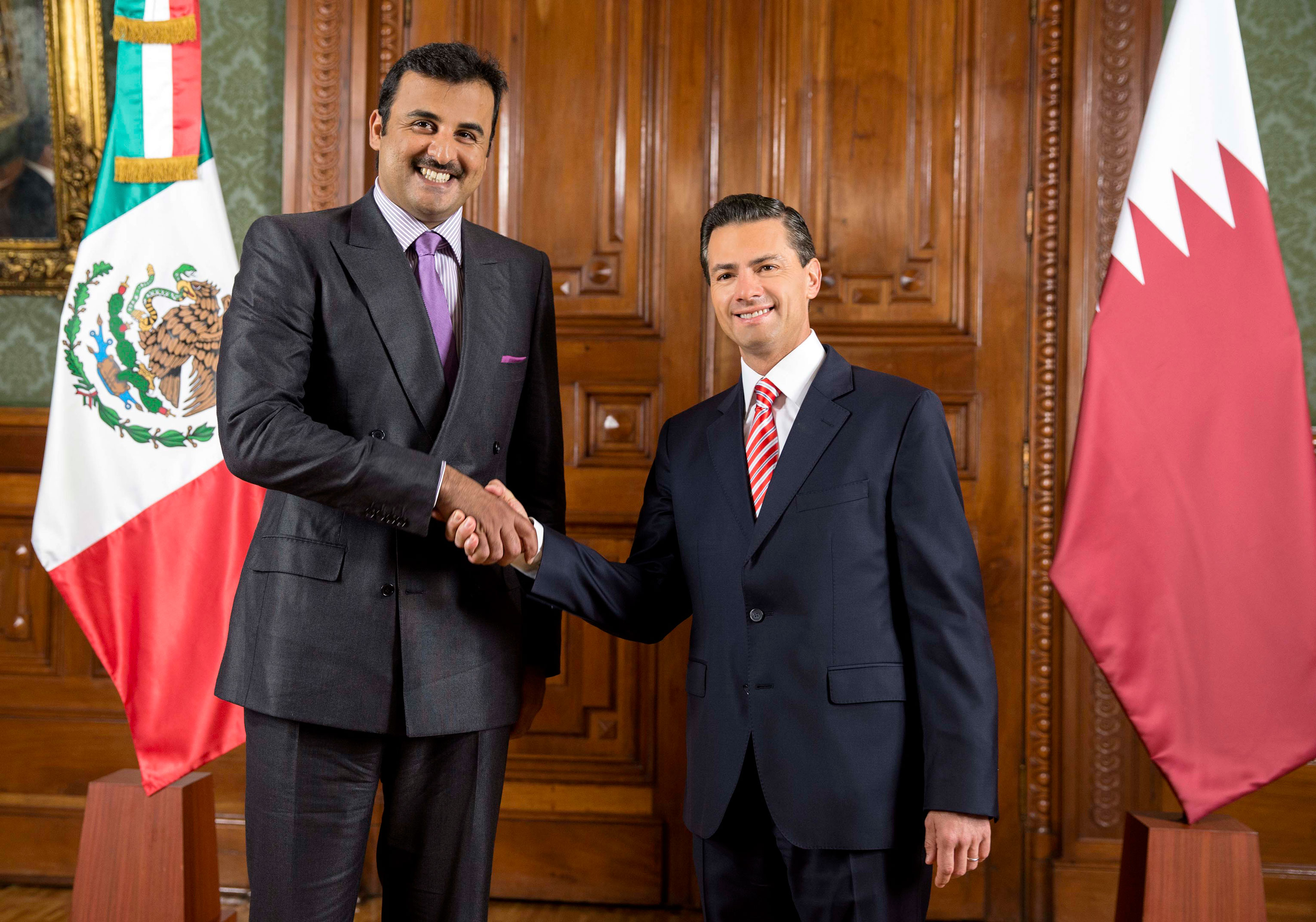
Emir of Qatar in the Mexican Palacio Nacional

- (Costa Rica) National Order of Juan Mora Fernández, Grand Cross with Gold Plaque, awarded by Laura Chinchilla on 19 February 2013.
- (France) National Order of the Legion of Honour, Grand Cross, awarded by Francois Hollande on 10 April 2014.
- (Portugal) Order of Prince Henry, Grand Collar, awarded by Aníbal Cavaco Silva on 2 June 2014.
- Order of Isabella the Catholic, Grand Cross with Collar, awarded by King Juan Carlos I of Spain on 6 June 2014.
- Order of the Sun of Peru, Grand Cross with Diamonds, awarded by Ollanta Humala on 17 July 2014.
- Order of the Bath, Honorary Knight Grand Cross, awarded by Queen Elizabeth II of the United Kingdom on 3 March 2015.
- (Guatemala) Order of the Quetzal, Grand Collar, awarded by Otto Pérez Molina on 13 March 2015.
- (Brazil) Order of the Southern Cross, Grand Collar, awarded by Dilma Rousseff on 26 May 2015.
- Order of Charles III, Grand Cross with Collar, awarded by King Felipe VI of Spain on 20 June 2015.
- Order of the White Rose of Finland, Grand Cross with Collar, awarded by Sauli Niinistö on 25 May 2015.
- (Chile) Order of Merit, Grand Collar, awarded by Michelle Bachelet on 13 August 2015.
- Order of King Abdulaziz, Collar, awarded by King Salman of Saudi Arabia on 17 January 2016.
- (Kuwait) Order of Mubarak the Great, Collar, awarded by Emir Sabah Al-Ahmad Al-Jaber Al-Sabah on 20 January 2016.
- Order of the Elephant, Knight, awarded by Queen Margrethe II of Denmark on 13 April 2016.
- (Italy) Order of Merit of the Italian Republic, Grand Cross with Cordon, awarded by Sergio Mattarella on 21 July 2016.
- (Argentina) Order of the Liberator General San Martín, Grand Collar, awarded by Mauricio Macri on 29 July 2016.
- (Portugal) Military Order of Saint James of the Sword, Grand Collar awarded by Marcelo Rebelo de Sousa on 17 July 2017.
- Medal of the Oriental Republic of Uruguay on 9 February 2018.

== See also ==
- 2015 Mexican legislative election
- 2012 Mexican general election
- 2005 State of Mexico election
- Peñabot

Political offices
Preceded by Arturo Montiel	Governor of the State of Mexico; 2005–2011	Succeeded by Eruviel Ávila
Preceded by Felipe Calderón	President of Mexico; 2012–2018	Succeeded by Andrés Manuel López Obrador
Party political offices
Preceded by Roberto Madrazo	Institutional Revolutionary Party nominee for President of Mexico; 2012	Succeeded by José Antonio Meade
