= Gustavo Baz Prada =

Mexican politician (1894–1987)

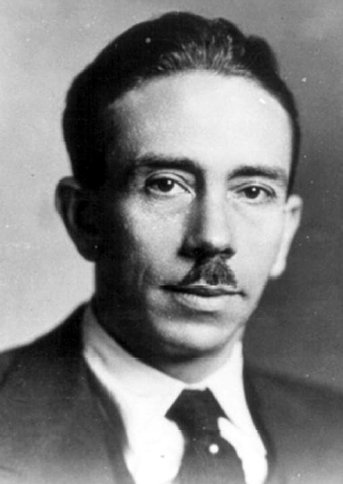
Gustavo Baz.

Gustavo Baz Prada (31 January 1894 – 12 October 1987) was a Mexican politician and medical doctor. He was Governor of the State of Mexico from 1914 to 1915 and from 1957 to 1963.

== Life ==
Baz Prada was born in Tlalnepantla in 1894, and his family moved to Zacatecas and Jalisco while he was young but he completed his education in Toluca. He then went to Mexico's Medical Military College.

In 1914 Baz Prada served as a medical doctor treating the troops of Vicente Navarro. He rose to the rank of Brigadier General in the forces of Zapata. It was during this time he first served as governor of the state of Mexico. In 1916 he resigned his generalship to continue his medical studies.

He completed his studies in 1920 and by 1922 was on the faculty of the military medical school. In 1925 he went to the United States doing further medical studies with Harvard Medical School, Augustan Hospital in Chicago and also in Rochester, New York. In 1926 and 1927 he went to France, Belgium and Germany, studying at the University of Paris among other institutions. In 1935 he was made director of Mexico's National School of Medicine.

Baz Prada was head of the National Autonomous University of Mexico (UNAM) from 1938 until 1940. From 1940 until 1946 he was Secretary of Health and Welfare for Mexico.

During his tenure as governor of Mexico State he brought about the founding of the State University of Mexico. He was appointed to Mexico's Supreme Council of Health in 1965.

Baz Prada died in Mexico City in 1987.

== Sources ==
- Autonomous University of Mexico State bio of Baz Prada
- Anzaldo, . R. V., & Nuño, A. E. (1987). Gustavo Baz: El hombre. México, D.F: V. Anzaldo y Regalado.

Preceded by Juan de Dios Bátiz Peredes	Belisario Domínguez Medal of Honor; 1978	Succeeded by Fidel Velázquez Sánchez
