= Pact for Mexico =

Political agreement

The Pact for Mexico is a national political agreement signed on December 2, 2012 in the Chapultepec Castle in Mexico City by the president of Mexico, Enrique Peña Nieto, as well as Gustavo Madero Muñoz, the president of the National Action Party; Cristina Díaz, the acting chair of the Institutional Revolutionary Party; and Jesús Zambrano Grijalva, chair of the Party of the Democratic Revolution. The Green Party of Mexico joined as a signatory to the agreement on January 28, 2013. The pact's framework is composed of 95 public policy proposals based on three guiding principles:

- The strengthening of the Mexican State
- The democratization of the economy and politics, as well as the expansion and effective implementation of social rights
- The participation of citizens as key actors in the design, implementation and evaluation of public policies.

The pact is divided into 5 parts: Vision, Agreements, National Budget Agreements 2013, Work Method, and Commitments for the Reforms.

== Signing ==
The signing of the Pact for Mexico was held on December 2, 2012, one day after the inauguration of the Peña Nieto administration. At the official ceremony held at Chapultepec Castle, guests other than the main signatories included Jesús Murillo Karam, president of the Chamber of Deputies; Ernesto Cordero Arroyo, president of the Senate of the Republic; the parliamentary coordinators of the various parties of the houses of the Congress of the Union; members of the Mexican Executive Cabinet; state governors; the head of government for the federal district; and the leaders of the Green Party.

== Agreements ==
The Pact contains five major agreements on different topic areas. These major agreements in turn contain individual agreements that all together add up to 95 commitments.

=== Achieving a Society of Rights and Freedoms ===
This first section of the Pact deals with agreements on proposals to address economic and educational inequality, as well as Mexico's positions on human rights.

== Addendum ==
On May 7, 2013, Peña Nieto and the leaders of the three largest national political parties – César Camacho Quiroz of the Institutional Revolutionary Party, Gustavo Madero Muñoz of the National Action Party, and Jesús Zambrano Grijalva of the Party of the Democratic Revolution – signed an addendum to the Pact with two parts containing eleven additional proposals.

== Results ==
The Pact has so far resulted in the passage of an education reform bill, a legal reform bill, and a telecom reform bill. An energy bill was also completed after the Party of the Democratic Revolution left the Pact in November 2013.

=== Education reform ===
In February 2013, education reform outlined in the Pact for Mexico and written into the Official Journal of the Federation entered into force. The February reforms included laying out the composition, selection, and governance processes of Mexico's national education evaluation system, as well as introducing a competitive process for the hiring, promotion, recognition, and tenure of teachers, principals, and administrators and declared that all previous appointments that did not conform to the procedures were null.

== Reviews ==
The Pact has been lauded in The Christian Science Monitor as breaking down difficult parliamentary gridlock and leading to needed reforms.

Shortly after the Pact was announced, it was criticized as "seek[ing] to replace necessary public debate on the future of the nation with back-room negotiations among politicians committing business as usual," by legal scholar John M. Ackerman in Proceso.
