= Governor of the State of Mexico =

Political position in the State of Mexico

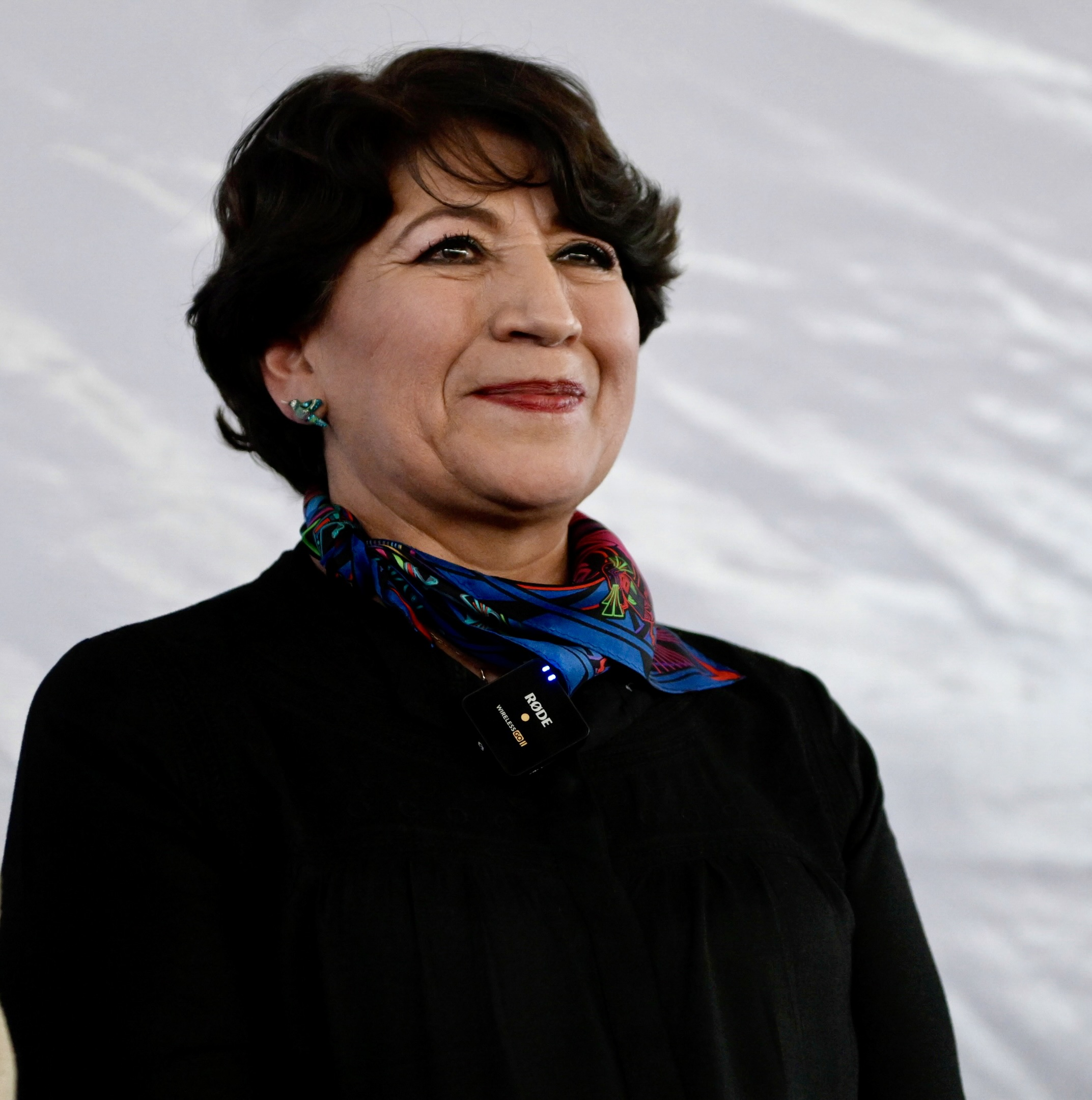
- Incumbent; Delfina Gómez Álvarez since September 16, 2023
- Term length: Six years, non-renewable.

The governor of the State of Mexico (Spanish: Gobernador Constitucional del Estado de México) wields executive power in the State of Mexico (a.k.a. Edomex).

The Governor of the State of Mexico is directly elected by the citizens, using secret ballot, to a six-year term with no possibility of reelection.

== List of the governors of the State of Mexico ==
- (1827–1828): Lorenzo de Zavala
- (1913): José Refugio Velasco
- (1913–1914): Joaquín Beltrán Castañares
- (1914): Cristóbal Solano
- (1914): Francisco Murguía
- (1914): Rafael M. Hidalgo
- (1914–1915): Gustavo Baz
- (1915–1916): Pascual Morales y Molina
- (1916–1917): Rafael Cepeda
- (1917): Carlos Tejada
- (1917–1918): Agustín Millán Vivero
- (1918–1919): Joaquín García Luna
- (1919): Agustín Millán Vivero
- (1919–1920): Francisco Javier Gaxiola
- (1920): Agustín Millán Vivero
- (1920): Darío López
- (1920–1921): Abundio Gómez
- (1921): Manuel Campos Mena
- (1921–1925): Abundio Gómez
- (1925–1929): Carlos Riva Palacio
- (1929–1933): Filiberto Gómez, National Revolutionary Party (PNR)
- (1933–1935): José Luis Solórzano, PNR
- (1935–1937): Eucario López, PNR
- (1937–1941): Wenceslao Labra, PNR
- (1941–1942): Alfredo Zárate Albarrán, Party of the Mexican Revolution, (PRM)
- (1942): José Luis Gutiérrez y Gutiérrez, PRM
- (1942–1945): Isidro Fabela, PRM
- (1945–1951): Alfredo del Mazo Vélez, PRM
- (1951–1957): Salvador Sánchez Colín Institutional Revolutionary Party (PRI)
- (1957–1963): Gustavo Baz, PRI
- (1963–1969): Juan Fernández Albarrán, PRI
- (1969–1975): Carlos Hank González, PRI
- (1975–1981): Jorge Jiménez Cantú, PRI
- (1981–1986): Alfredo del Mazo González, PRI
- (1986–1987): Alfredo Baranda García, PRI
- (1987–1989): Mario Ramón Beteta, PRI
- (1989–1993): Ignacio Pichardo Pagaza, PRI
- (1993–1995): Emilio Chuayffet, PRI
- (1995–1999): César Camacho Quiroz, PRI
- (1999–2005): Arturo Montiel Rojas, PRI
- (2005–2011): Enrique Peña Nieto, PRI
- (2011–2017): Eruviel Ávila Villegas, PRI
- (2017–2023): Alfredo del Mazo Maza, PRI
- (2023–present): Delfina Gómez Álvarez MORENA

== See also ==
- List of Mexican state governors
- 2005 México state election
