= Alfredo Baranda García =

Mexican politician (1944–2024)

Federal Consumer Procurator
- In office 1 October 1990 – 30 November 1994
- Preceded by: Emilio Chuayffet
- Succeeded by: Fernando Lerdo de Tejada Luna

Governor of the State of Mexico
- In office 21 April 1986 – 15 September 1987
- Preceded by: Alfredo del Mazo González
- Succeeded by: Mario Ramón Beteta

Personal details
- Born: 11 November 1944; Mexico City, Mexico
- Died: 6 March 2024 (aged 79); Mexico City, Mexico
- Political party: PRI
- Education: National Autonomous University of Mexico
- Occupation: Lawyer

Alfredo Baranda García (11 November 1944 – 6 March 2024) was a Mexican lawyer and politician. A member of the Institutional Revolutionary Party, he served as Governor of the State of Mexico from 1986 to 1987 and was Federal Consumer Procurator from 1990 to 1994.

Baranda died in Mexico City on 6 March 2024, at the age of 79.
