= Jorge Jiménez Cantú =

Mexican politician

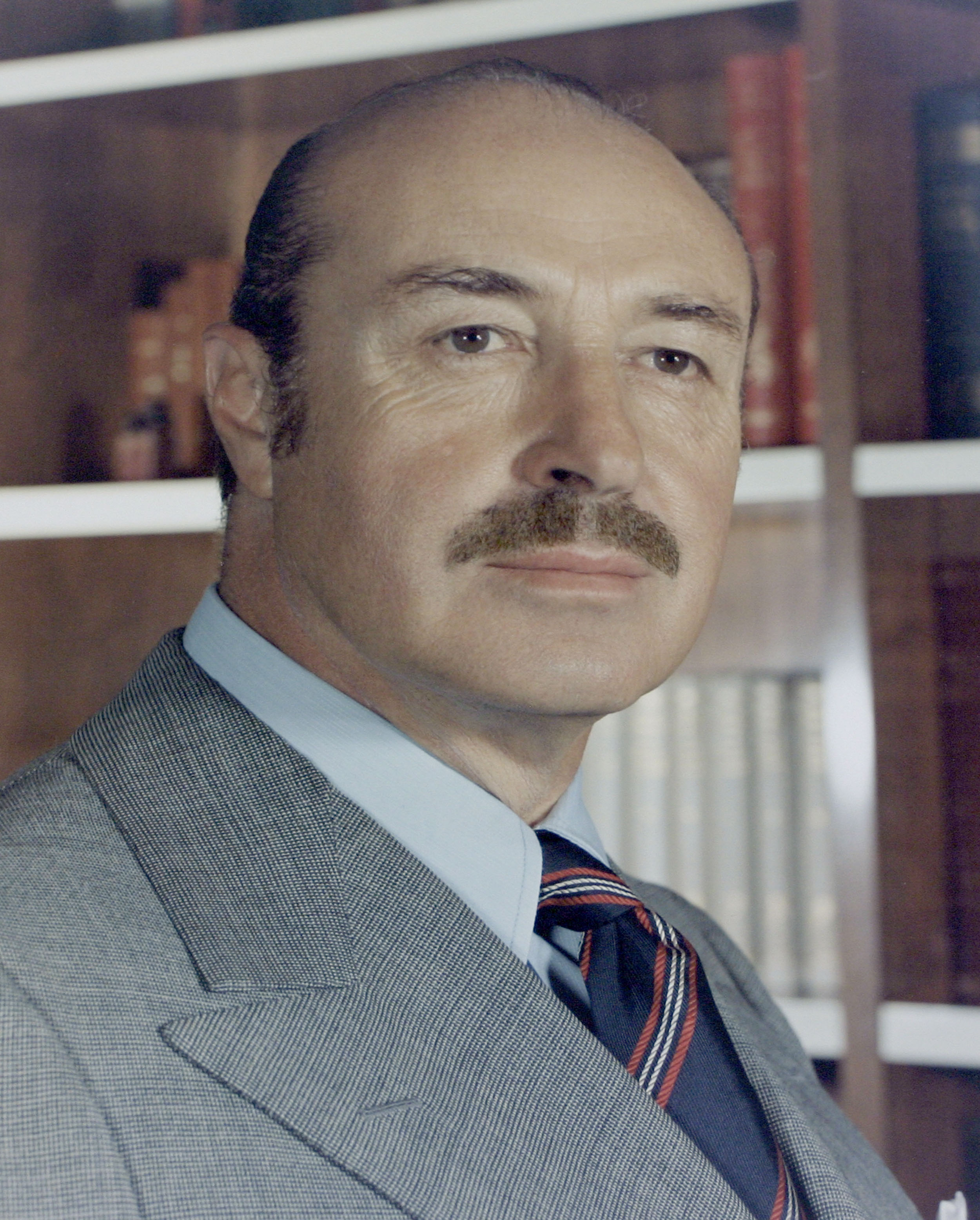

Governor of the State of Mexico
- In office 1975–1981
- Preceded by: Carlos Hank González
- Succeeded by: Alfredo del Mazo González

Secretary of Health and Welfare
- In office 1970–1975
- President: Luis Echeverria Alvarez

Personal details
- Born: October 27, 1914 Mexico City
- Died: November 10, 2005 (aged 91)
- Party: PRI
- Spouse: Luisa Isabel Campos
- Profession: Politician, Doctor

Jorge Jiménez Cantú (October 27, 1914 – November 10, 2005) was a Mexican physician and politician. A member of the Institutional Revolutionary Party (PRI), he served as Governor of the State of Mexico between 1975 and 1981. He served as Secretary of Health and Welfare from 1970 to 1975 under President Luis Echeverria Alvarez.

== Early life ==
Jiménez Cantú was born on October 27, 1914. In 1931, he joined the National Preparatory School, where he attended high school in biological sciences and served as faculty advisor. He then decided to enter the Faculty of Medicine of the National Autonomous University of Mexico in 1934.

== Career ==
From 1970 to 1975, he served as Secretary of Health and Welfare during the presidency of Luis Echeverría Álvarez. In this position, he oversaw the creation of the National Health Plan and National Vaccination Campaign. He later served as Governor of the State of Mexico from 1975 to 1981.

== Personal life ==
Jiménez Cantú died on November 10, 2005, at the age of 91. He was survived by his wife, Luisa Isabel Campos, who later died in 2017.
