= Alfredo del Mazo González =

Mexican politician (1943–2019)

Secretary of Energy, Mines and State Industry
- In office 21 April 1986 – 3 March 1988
- President: Miguel de la Madrid
- Preceded by: Francisco Labastida Ochoa
- Succeeded by: Fernando Hiriart Balderrama

Governor of the State of Mexico
- In office 16 September 1981 – 21 April 1986
- Preceded by: Jorge Jiménez Cantú
- Succeeded by: Alfredo Baranda García

Personal details
- Born: 31 December 1943 Toluca, State of Mexico, Mexico
- Died: 10 January 2019 (aged 75)
- Party: PRI
- Education: National Autonomous University of Mexico

Alfredo Hilario Isidro del Mazo González (31 December 1943 – 10 January 2019) was a Mexican politician affiliated with the Institutional Revolutionary Party.

== Early life ==
He was the Governor of the State of Mexico from 1981 to 1986 and the Secretary of Energy during part of President Miguel de la Madrid's national government.

In 1997 he represented the PRI in first election for the Head of Government of the Federal District, but lost to Cuauhtémoc Cárdenas of the Party of the Democratic Revolution.

He also served briefly as Deputy of the LIX Legislature of the Mexican Congress as a plurinominal representative in 2003.

Preceded by Francisco Labastida Ochoa	Secretary of Energy, Mines and State Industry; 1986 — 1988	Succeeded by Fernando Hiriart Balderrama
Preceded by Jorge Jiménez Cantú	Governor of the State of Mexico; 1981 — 1986	Succeeded by Alfredo Baranda García
