= 17th federal electoral district of the State of Mexico =

Federal electoral district of Mexico

State of Mexico's 17th
- Electoral district of the Chamber of Deputies of Mexico

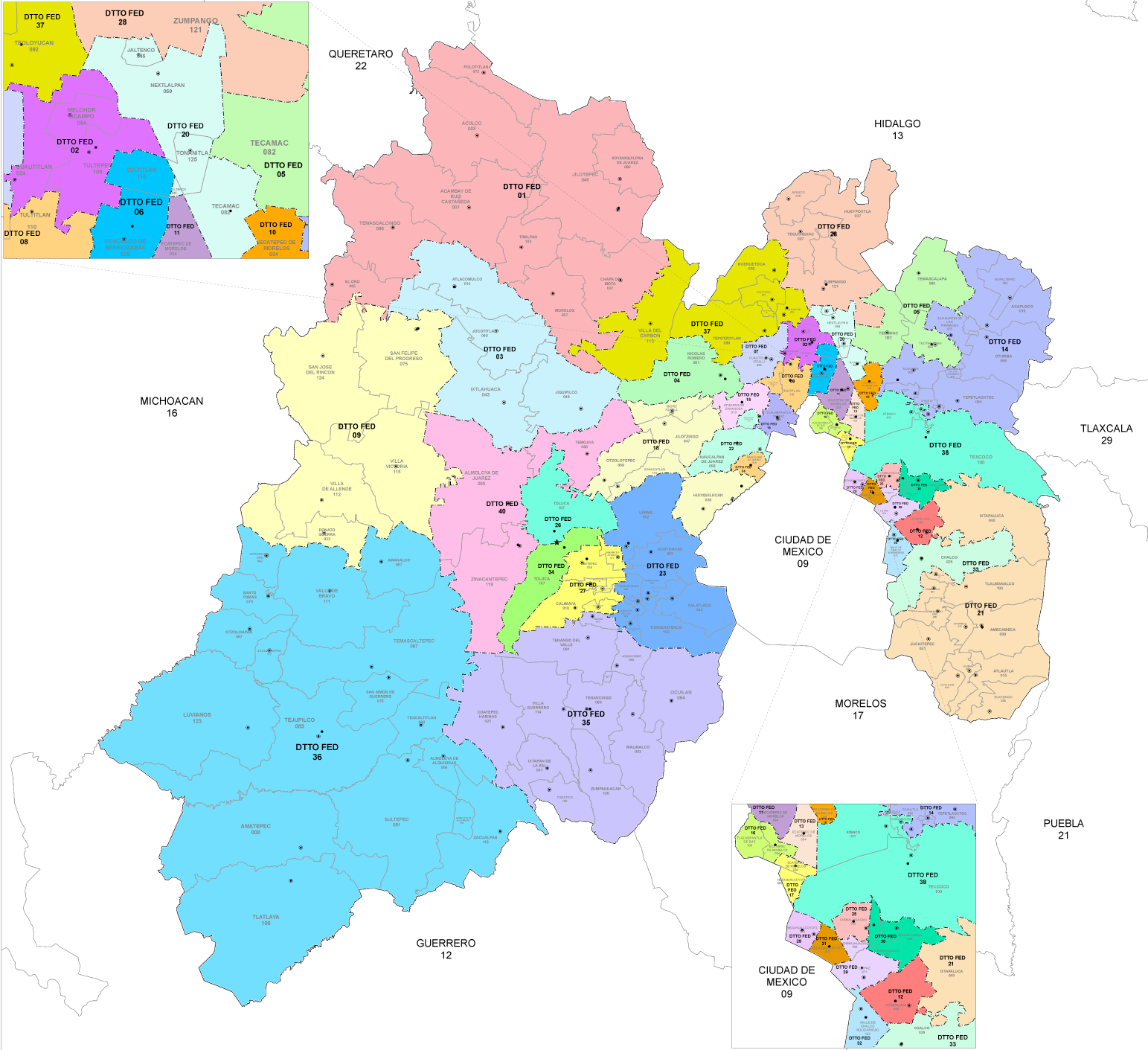
- State of Mexico's districts since 2023

Incumbent
- Member: Juan Hugo de la Rosa García
- Party: ▌Morena
- Congress: 66th (2024–2027)

District
- State: State of Mexico
- Head town: Ecatepec
- Coordinates: 19°34′N 99°03′W
- Covers: Ecatepec de Morelos (part), Nezahualcóyotl (part)
- PR region: Fifth
- Precincts: 196
- Population: 365,602 (2020 census)

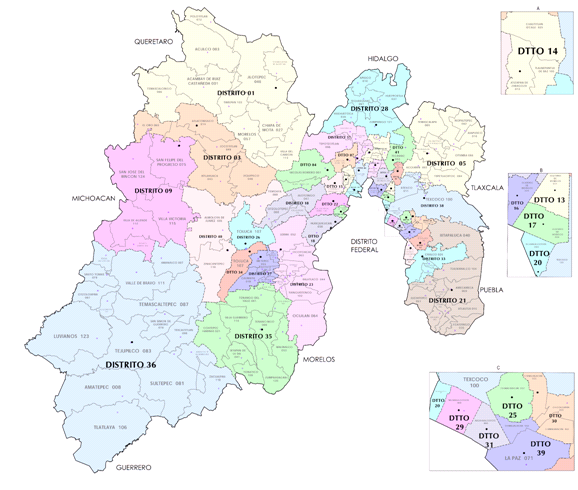
2017–2022 districting scheme

The 17th federal electoral district of the State of Mexico (Spanish: Distrito electoral federal 17 del Estado de México) is one of the 300 electoral districts into which Mexico is divided for elections to the federal Chamber of Deputies and one of 40 such districts in the State of Mexico.

It elects one deputy to the lower house of Congress for each three-year legislative session by means of the first-past-the-post system. Votes cast in the district also count towards the calculation of proportional representation ("plurinominal") deputies elected from the fifth region.

Suspended in 1930, (Note: An amendment to Article 52 of the Constitution in 1928 changed the original provision of "one deputy per 60,000 inhabitants" to "one deputy per 100,000"; as a result, the size of the Chamber of Deputies fell from 281 in the 1928 election to 171 in 1934.) the 17th district was re-created by the 1977 electoral reforms, which increased the number of single-member seats in the Chamber of Deputies from 196 to 300. Under that plan, the State of Mexico's seat allocation rose from 15 to 34. The new districts were first contended in the 1979 mid-term election.

The current member for the district, elected in the 2024 general election, is Juan Hugo de la Rosa García of the National Regeneration Movement (Morena).

== District territory ==
Under the 2023 districting plan adopted by the National Electoral Institute (INE), which is to be used for the 2024, 2027 and 2030 federal elections, the 17th district is located in the Greater Mexico City urban area, covering 196 electoral precincts (secciones electorales) across portions of two of the state's 125 municipalities:

- Ecatepec de Morelos (south) and Nezahualcóyotl (north). (Note: The remainder of Ecatepec is covered by the 10th, 11th, 13th and 16th districts; the remainder of Nezahualcóyotl is covered by the 29th and 31st districts.)

The head town (cabecera distrital), where results from individual polling stations are gathered together and tallied, is the city of Ecatepec. In the 2020 census, the district reported a total population of 365,602.

== Previous districting schemes ==
Evolution of electoral district numbers
	1974	1978	1996	2005	2017	2023
State of Mexico	15	34	36	40	41	40
Chamber of Deputies	196	300				

Under the previous districting plans enacted by the INE and its predecessors, the 17th district was situated as follows:

2017–2022

A portion of the municipality of Ecatepec.

2005–2017

The eastern part of Ecatepec.

1996–2005

The south-east of Ecatepec.

1978–1996

The municipalities of Isidro Fabela, Ixtlahuaca, Jilotzingo, Jiquipilco, Nicolás Romero, Otzolotepec, Temoaya, Villa del Carbón and Xonacatlán, with its head town at Ciudad Nicolás Romero.

== Deputies returned to Congress ==
(Mexico) National parties
- Current
- PAN
- PRI
- PT
- PVEM
- MC
- Morena
- PAZ
- Somos
- Defunct or local only
- PLM
- PNR
- PRM
- PNM
- PP
- PPS
- PARM
- PFCRN
- CON
- PANAL
- PSD
- PES
- PES
- PRD

State of Mexico's 17th district
Election	Deputy	Party	Term	Legislature
1979	Fernando Barrera Velázquez	Institutional Revolutionary Party	1979–1982	51st Congress
1982	Apolinar de la Cruz Loreto	Institutional Revolutionary Party	1982–1985	52nd Congress
1985	Abelardo Rigoberto Alanís González	Institutional Revolutionary Party	1985–1988	53rd Congress
1988	Heberto Barrera Velázquez	Institutional Revolutionary Party	1988–1991	54th Congress
1991	Rodrigo Alejandro Nieto Enríquez	Institutional Revolutionary Party	1991–1994	55th Congress
1994	Raúl Lara Chanes	Institutional Revolutionary Party	1994–1997	56th Congress
1997	David Miguel Noyola Martínez	Party of the Democratic Revolution	1997–2000	57th Congress
2000	Rafael Ramírez Agama	National Action Party (Mexico)	2000–2003	58th Congress
2003	Pablo Bedolla López	Institutional Revolutionary Party	2003–2006	59th Congress
2006	Hugo Eduardo Martínez Padilla	Party of the Democratic Revolution	2006–2009	60th Congress
2009	Josué Cirino Valdés Huezo	Institutional Revolutionary Party	2009–2012	61st Congress
2012	Jessica Salazar Trejo	Party of the Democratic Revolution	2012–2015	62nd Congress
2015	Luis Felipe Vázquez Guerrero	Institutional Revolutionary Party	2015–2018	63rd Congress
2018	María Guadalupe Román Ávila	National Regeneration Movement	2018–2021	64th Congress
2021	María Guadalupe Román Ávila	National Regeneration Movement	2021–2024	65th Congress
2024	Juan Hugo de la Rosa García	National Regeneration Movement	2024–2027	66th Congress

== Presidential elections ==
State of Mexico's 17th district
Election	District won by	Party or coalition	%
2018	Andrés Manuel López Obrador	Juntos Haremos Historia	60.3931
2024	Claudia Sheinbaum Pardo	Sigamos Haciendo Historia	58.4125
