= Hugo Martínez =

Hugo Martínez may refer to:

- Hugo Martínez (police officer), Colombian police officer tasked with apprehending the drug lord Pablo Escobar
  - Hugo Martínez Jr., his son, also involved with the apprehension of Pablo Escobar
- Hugo Martínez (boxer), Argentine boxer
- Hugo Martínez (footballer), Paraguayan footballer
- Hugo Martínez (politician), Salvadoran engineer, politician, diplomat and writer
- Hugo Eduardo Martínez Padilla (born 1971), Mexican politician

== See also ==
- Hugo Soto-Martinez, American labor organizer and politician
