= Renato López =

Mexican television presenter (1983–2016)

Renato López Uhthoff
- Born: March 11, 1983; Mexico City
- Died: November 23, 2016 (aged 33); Santa María Mazatla, Jilotzingo, State of Mexico
- Cause of death: Murder by gunshot
- Occupation(s): Presenter, actor, musician

Renato López Uhthoff (March 11, 1983 – November 23, 2016) was a Mexican television presenter, actor and musician.

== Early life ==
He was born in 1983 in Mexico City, but at an early age his family took him to the United States, where he lived in Miami, Los Angeles and New York. As a result, he spoke both Spanish and English fluently. From the age of 6, he modeled and performed in commercials. Renato was the brother of Swedish singer Denise Lopez., Sebastian "DjZeb" López, Samantha López, Arturo Everitt (photographer in Los Angeles) and Tiana Del Castillo. He had been in a seven-year relationship with Alexandra Ivanisevic, a fashion blogger and Swedish transplant to Mexico City.

== Career ==
He was a guitarist for the rock band The Prom Kings and previously hosted music shows on Mun2, such as El show and Vivo. López had an homonymous TV show on Telehit which started on March 14, 2011. After leaving Telehit, in August 2012, he joined E! Entertainment to host the show Zona Trendy.

In 2012, he appeared in the Mexican film El Cielo En Tu Mirada.

He wrote songs for Mexican pop stars such as "Si pudiera" for Paty Cantú and Fuego con fuego for Gloria Trevi. He also starred in Trevi's music video Vestida de azúcar and had a small music production company in Los Angeles and a music studio in Mexico City.

He was hosting the TV shows E! Latin News on E! Latinoamérica, and MxDiseña on Canal Sony México, at the time of his death. In 2016, he costarred in Juanes' video Fuego as well as the Mexican film Macho, which was playing in Mexican cinemas at the time of his death.

== Death ==
On November 22, 2016, the day before the bodies of López and his publicist Omar Girón Juárez were found, they had driven to the affluent suburban area of Zona Esmeralda, Atizapán in the northwestern part of Greater Mexico City and an area that was teeming with regional drug cartels. A man named Carlos Morales had invited them to either a casting or a meeting about a PR campaign, and arranged to pick them up and drive them to another location where the casting or meeting was supposedly to take place. Morales was identified as a suspect in the investigation. Around 5:30 P.M., Girón emailed Morales, stating that the area looked lonely and dangerous. That was the last anyone heard from Girón or López. López's and Girón's bodies were found with gunshot wounds, inside a car, in Santa María Mazatla, a rural village in the Jilotzingo municipality, about 15 km west of Zona Esmeralda.

=== Motives ===
Authorities have concluded that the assassins were targeting López specifically, as there was no evidence of robbery, nor kidnapping and López was shot 13 times. On December 10, 2016, newspapers reported that the State of Mexico prosecutor stated that the assassination motive may have been a crime of passion, related to an unknown woman.

=== Reaction ===
Celebrities such as LP, Juanes, Gloria Trevi, Bárbara Mori, Miguel Rodarte, Aislinn Derbez, Manolo Cardona, Aracely Arámbula and Dulce María mourned López's death on social media. Some friends of López tattooed the word "Taco" on the ring finger of their right hands in his memory, as he had such a tattoo, referring to his love for the Mexican food dish. It is now an acronym for "Todo Amor Cero Odio", denouncing the hate and violence that killed him.
