= Pablo Bedolla López =

Mexican politician

- Born: 29 June 1955 (age 71); Mexicali, Baja California, Mexico
- Occupation: Politician
- Political party: Institutional Revolutionary Party

Pablo Bedolla López (born 29 June 1955) is a Mexican politician affiliated with the Institutional Revolutionary Party. He represented the 11th district of the State of Mexico in the Chamber of Deputies of the LXIII Legislature of the Mexican Congress.

== Life ==
=== Early political career ===
Bedolla's involvement in PRI politics began at a young age. In 1970, Bedolla served in the National Confederation of Organizations, a component of the Confederación Nacional de Organizaciones Populares. In 1973 and 1974, he served as a founding and special delegate, respectively, in the National Movement of Revolutionary Youth (MNJR).

1976 marked a turning point in Bedolla's career; he served as a regional youth delegate from the CNOP in northwestern Mexico, and in the same year, he became Chief of the Section of Political Investigations in the local department of government in the municipality of Ecatepec de Morelos, beginning what would become a lengthy political career in the State of Mexico. He became a secretarial advisor in Ecatepec the next year; meanwhile, he became a coordinator in the CNOP in 1976, and the municipal president of the MNJR in 1977. From 1978 to 1980, he began a short stint in the SHCP, where he worked as an inspector and headed the Center for Identification of Personnel.

From 1979 to 1980, Bedolla served as a private secretary to the municipal president of Ecatepec, then as a municipal secretary in the early 1980s. During this time, Bedolla also obtained an undergraduate degree in political science and public administration from the UNAM. After a year as the federal director of Planning of Personal Development in the Secretariat of Programming and Budget (SPP), Bedolla went to work for the INEGI, as an administrative coordinator, federal director of audits, budget controller, and internal comptroller, all between 1985 and 1986.

=== 1990s: First legislative term and return to PRI action ===
After two years as a municipal secretary in Ecatepec, voters sent Bedolla López to public office for the first time as he became a local deputy to the LI Legislature of the Congress of the State of Mexico, between 1990 and 1993. Once his term concluded, Bedolla became more active in PRI politics than he had been in the 1980s: he coordinated municipal committees for the State Front of Organizations and Citizens and served as the FEOC's special delegate to Toluca, Ciudad Nezahualcóyotl and Cocotitlán, also serving as a district delegate in the state PRI.

=== 2000s: San Lázaro and the state government ===
In 2002, Bedolla was tapped to become the Secretary of Metropolitan Development in the State of Mexico. He left that post a year later to become a federal deputy for the first time, in the LIX Legislature, for the State of Mexico 17th district. He was a parliamentary group coordinator and sat on commissions related to Metropolitan Development, Governance, and Special for Planning to Define the Future of Mexico.

When that term ended, he briefly served as the director general of the Technological Center of Higher Studies in Chimalhuacán and as a regional director general in the state government for the Texcoco Region before being tapped as state deputy secretary of government.

Bedolla returned to the state congress in 2009, in its LVII Legislature. He presided over two commissions: Social Development and Tracking and Evaluation of Social Programs.

=== 2010s: Municipal presidency and return to the Chamber of Deputies ===
In 2012, Bedolla graduated from the UNAM once again, this time with a master's degree in political science; three years later, he would obtain a doctorate in public administration from the same institution.

From 2011 to 2012, Bedolla was the PRI's deputy secretary of organization. In July 2012, voters in Ecatepec, the city where he had spent much of his early political life, elected Bedolla as municipal president with 80,000 more votes than the second-place PRD candidate, and he took the position on 1 January 2013. His administration was marked by lows such as the 30–30 disaster, in which a stampede developed at a La Arrolladora Banda El Limón concert, where three people died, as well as a general increase in crime and car thefts.

On 21 January 2015, Bedolla asked for license to step down as the municipal president of Ecatepec in order to pursue a successful bid to return to the Chamber of Deputies. He presided over the Commission for Productive Projects in Marginalized Zones and served on three others: Social Security, Radio and Television, and Oversight of the Superior Auditor of the Federation.
