= Jessica Salazar Trejo =

Mexican politician

- Born: 30 May 1991 (age 34); Mexico City, Mexico
- Occupation: Politician
- Political party: PRD

Jessica Salazar Trejo (born 30 May 1991) is a Mexican politician affiliated with the Party of the Democratic Revolution (PRD).

In the 2012 general election, at the age of 21, she was elected to the Chamber of Deputies to represent the State of Mexico's 17th district during the 62nd session of Congress.
