= Nicolás Romero (colonel) =

Mexican military figure

Nicolás Romero (born in Nopala, Hidalgo, 6 December 1827; died in Mexico City, 11 March 1865) was a Mexican military figure.

He had agricultural and textile businesses in what is the modern-day state of Hidalgo. Upon the outbreak of the Reform War in 1858, he joined the Liberal forces under Aureliano Rivera.

When Bonapartist France invaded in 1861, he engaged the invaders in guerrilla warfare, fighting in the states of México, Guerrero, Querétaro and Michoacán under Gen. Vicente Riva Palacio; there, his exploits earned him the nom de guerre León de la Montaña ("mountain lion"). While he was hiding in a tree in Papazindán, Michoacán, he was sighted by a trumpeter and captured by the French. From there he was taken to Mexico City where he was court martialed and, after denouncing the French invasion and rejecting to recognize their jurisdiction, he was found guilty and executed by a firing squad.

Ciudad Nicolás Romero in the State of México and Tiquicheo de Nicolás Romero in Michoacán bear his name.
