= Temoaya =

- Municipality
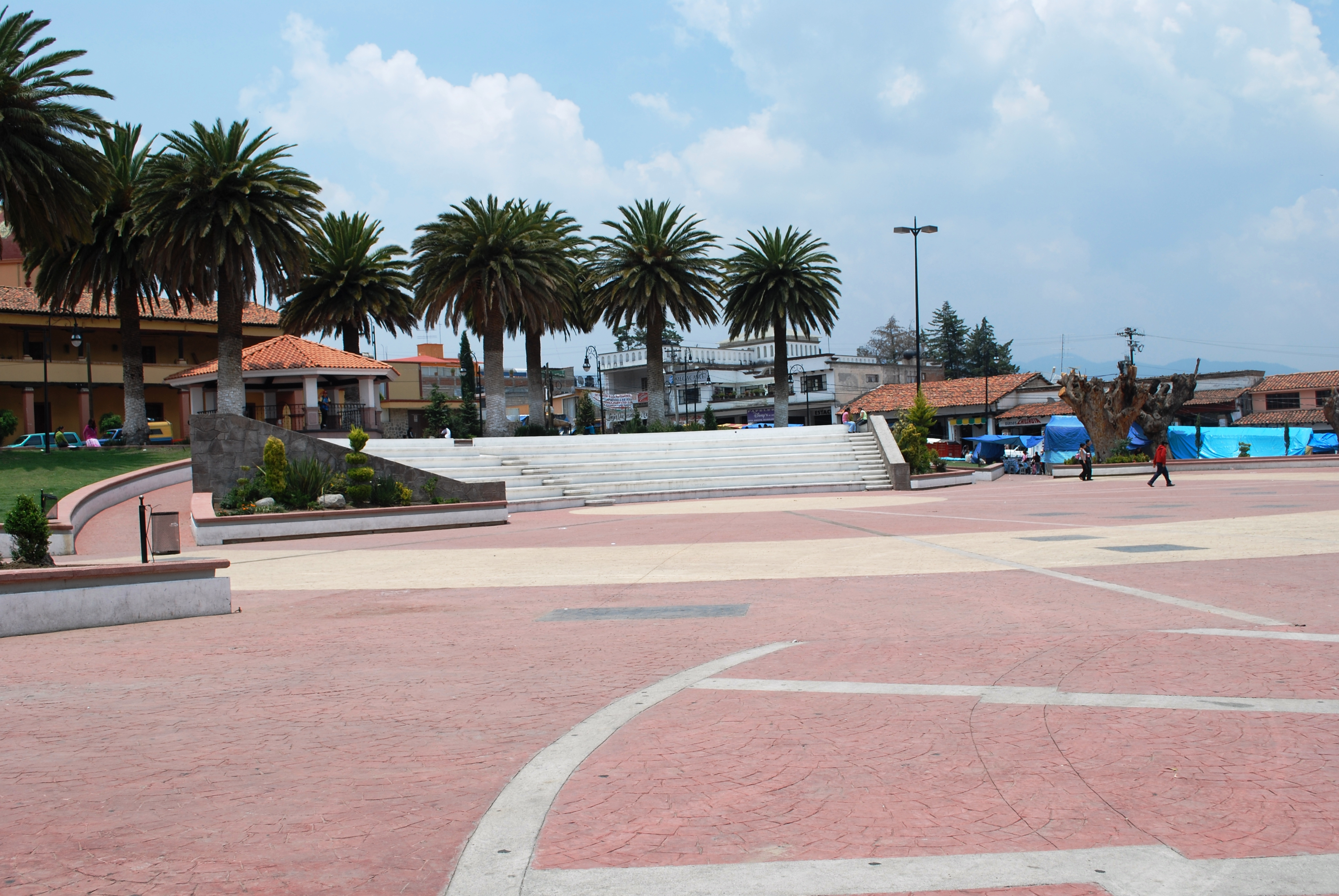
- Main plaza of Temoaya

- Coat of arms
- Interactive map of Temoaya
- Coordinates: 19°28′07″N 99°35′36″W
- Country: Mexico
- State: State of Mexico
- Municipal Seat: Temoaya
- Town Founded: 1220
- Municipality Founded: 1820

Government
  - Municipal President: C. Enrique Valdes Garcia
- Elevation (of seat): 2,670 m (8,760 ft)

Population (2005) Municipality
  - Municipality: 77,714
  - Seat: 2,987
- Time zone: UTC-6 (Central)
- Postal code (of seat): 50850
- Website: http://www.temoaya.gob.mx/

Temoaya is a municipality in the State of Mexico, Mexico. Its municipal seat is the town of Temoaya which is the sixth largest town in the municipality. It is located 18 kilometres (11 mi) from Toluca and 85 kilometres (53 mi) from Mexico City. It is known for its large ethnic Otomi population, the Centro Ceremonial Otomí and its tradition of making Persian style rugs using Mexican designs.

The name “Temoaya” comes from the Nahuatl phrase “Temoayan” which means “place of descending.” The Aztec glyph which depicts the municipality shows footprints descending a mountain. In local Otomi, the town is called "Nthekunthe" (meeting place between brothers), however more originally the settlement was named "Ndongu" ("house of the rock" or "casa grande", a large public structure).

== History ==
There have been humans in the Temoaya area since the prehistoric period. Remains from this time such as utensils, tools, human figures and mammoth bones have been found in various parts of the municipality. The Otomi have been living in this area since very far back in the pre-Hispanic era as one of the first ethnicities to live in the Valley of Mexico and northern Toluca Valley. There are archeological remains from this culture that date back at least as far as the pre-Classic era. Intense population of the Toluca Valley dates back to the 12th century, with the settlement of the Xiquipilco or Jiquipilco el Viejo site antecedent to modern Temoaya. No documents from this era survive but it is likely that modern Temoaya was the result of a division of Xiquipilco as it existed when the Aztecs came to the area at the end of the 15th century.

The Otomis of this region gained a reputation as fierce warriors over the pre-Hispanic period, fighting off the Toltecs, the Chichimecas under Xolotl and the Aztecs in the 15th century. Among the Aztecs, the Otomi also had a reputation of being barbarous, polygamous and sexually immoral. The Otomis of Xiquipilco fought against the Purépecha in 1462. Oral tradition states that until 1478, Tlilcuetzpalin, lord of the Otomi, defended the area from Aztec invasion, wounding Aztec emperor Axayacatl in battle. The Otomi here were conquered in 1486 by Ahuizotl, but chafed under Aztec rule, occasionally scheming with the Purépecha to try and wrest more sovereignty.

During the Spanish conquest of the Aztec Empire, the Otomi here sided with the Spanish. The first contact with the Spanish came in 1521, when Gonzalo de Sandoval was fighting against the Matlatzincas. Shortly the conquest, Frair Alonso Antonio Rangel began evangelization efforts in the area. The church established in Temoaya was dedicated to the Saint James. The area became part of the encomienda of Pedro Núñez, who divided much of the land into haciendas for other Spaniards. The Spanish town of Temoaya was officially founded in 1593, although the population center for the area remained at Xiquipilco for some time.

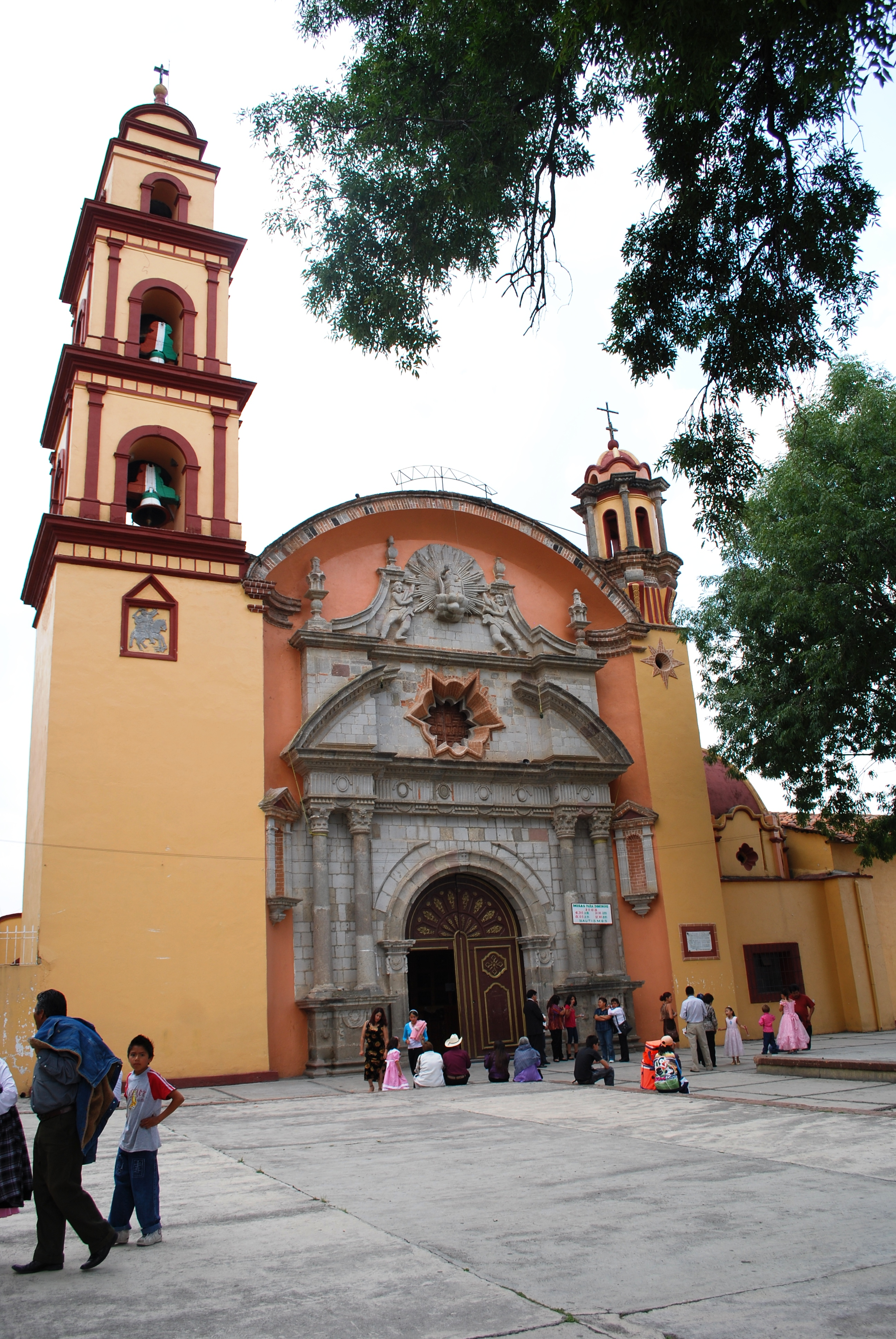
Facade of the Sanctuary of Señor Santiago

In the mid 16th century, Temoaya belonged to the jurisdiction of Xiquipilco although it had its own town council. By the end of the century, the area became an independent jurisdiction with old Xiquipilco completely abandoned. The municipality now known as Jiquipilco was known in early colonial times as San Juan. The raising of livestock on large haciendas made the areas one of the more prosperous in the areas, supplying much of the meat consumed in Mexico City. The Buenavista Hacienda alone extended over 4,000 hectares in the 17th century.

Until 1720, Temoaya was grouped ecclesiastically with San Juan (today Jiquipilco) and other towns. During that year, the church in Temoaya was granted parish status. This parish would roughly be the territory the municipality is now.

During the Mexican War of Independence, Miguel Hidalgo y Costilla passed through Temoaya after the Battle of Monte de las Cruces. The municipality was erected in 1820 under the Cadiz Constitution. After Independence, authorities were elected by the municipal residents. The municipality was refounded in 1870 when Mexico State lost a significant part of its territory to the states of Guerrero, Morelos and Hidalgo.

Economic and political turmoil during the rule of Porfirio Díaz forced many from Temoaya to move to Toluca, but most would return to Temoaya after the Mexican Revolution . During the Mexican Revolution, a number of armed groups struggled over the territory. In 1914, a Zapatista group sacked areas of the municipality. After this event, 100 volunteers banded together under Higinio Guadarramo and Melesio Arzate to defend the town.

From the end of hostilities through most of the rest of the 20th century, much of the town's public works were undertaken.

The production of hand-knotted rugs began here in 1970.(encmuc) Prior to rugmaking, the municipality had a reputation for weaving, making pre-Hispanic garments such as ayates, sashes, chincuetes and sarapes on backstrap looms.

Today, Temoaya is considered to be a center of the Otomi people as it has the most people of this ethnicity in Mexico State. In 1980, the Otomi Ceremonial Center was constructed in the municipality to preserve traditions and preserve Otomi identity.

== The town ==
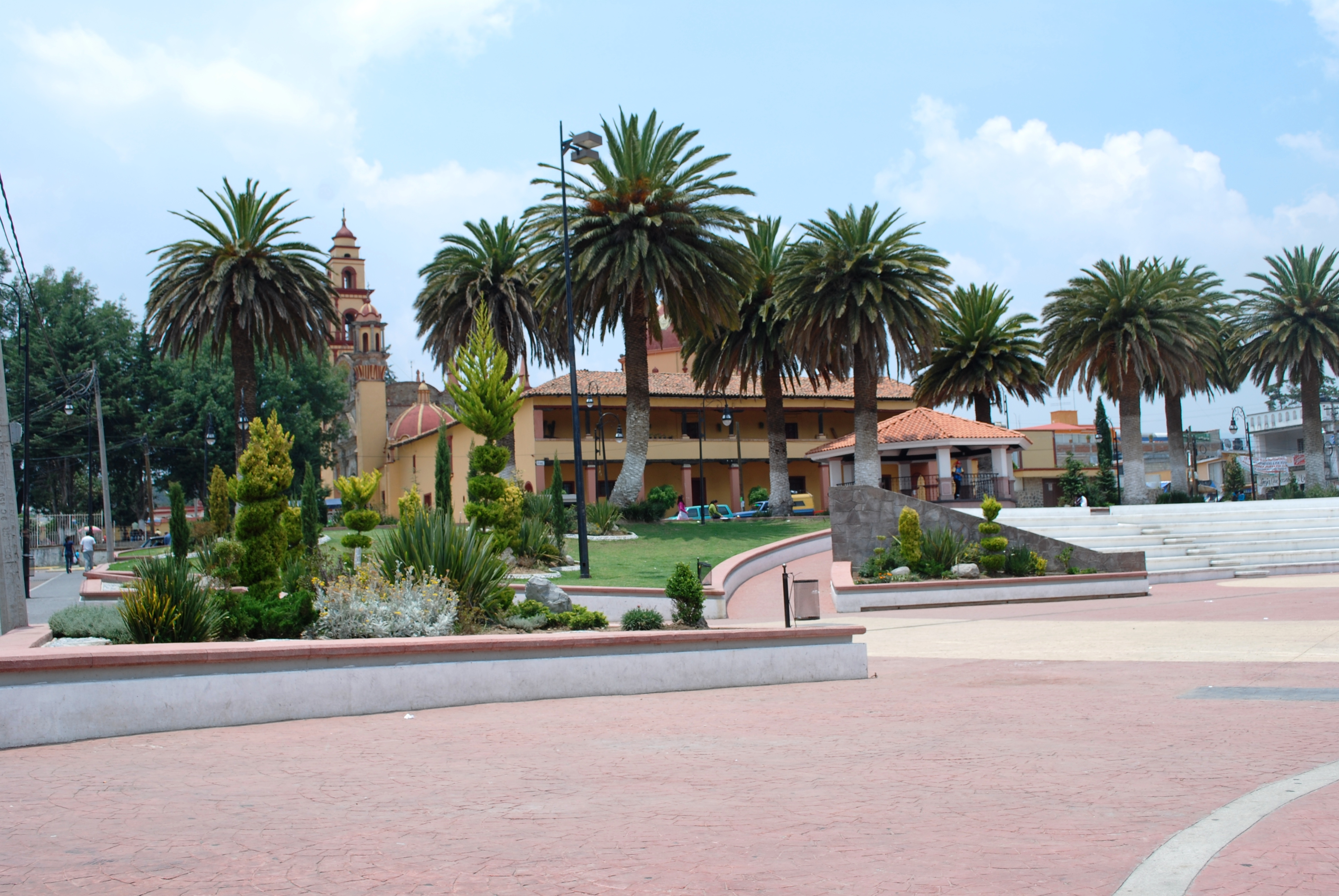
Looking in the direction of the church from the plaza

The town and seat of the municipality is the center of commerce for the area, providing basic needs such as food, tools, hardware, paper, sewing supplies, clothes and other items. Much of the commerce is done by sidewalk vendors and the weekly tianguis on Sundays is important, as the seat does not have a permanent market. Local dishes such as barbacoa, chicharrón, carnitas and others are mostly available during the Sunday market. The center of the town in a large plaza, which is surrounded by many old adobe houses with red tile roofs. Away from the main square, many of the buildings date from the 19th century.

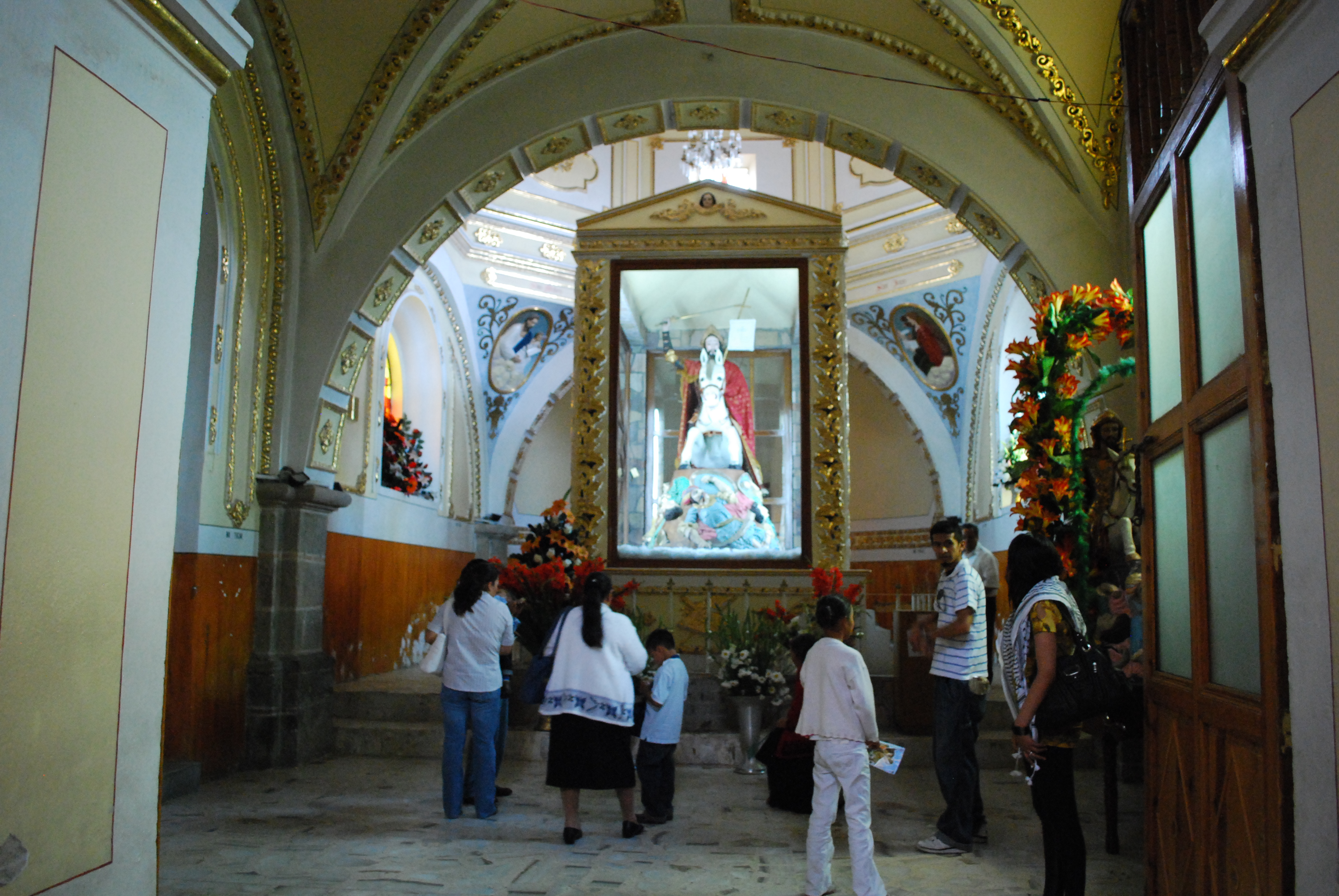
Image of Señor Santiago

The main church or the Sanctuary of Señor Santiago is just north of the plaza. The main nave of the church was begun in the 16th century by the Franciscans who came to evangelize the area. The church suffered a fire at the end of the 16th century. The main feature of the church is a very large equestrian sculpture of Saint James the Moor-slayer, which is the only one of its kind in Latin America, due to its size and age. It was carved by indigenous carvers in the early colonial period and has pre-Hispanic elements. Because of the importance of this image and the pilgrims it attracts, the church received the title of “sanctuary” in 1986 This church is the main one for the municipality, complemented by smaller ones in communities such as San Pedro Arriba, La Magdalena Tenexpan, San Diego Alcalá and San Lorenzo Oyamel. The lienzo charro or charreada ring is the property of the Asociacion de Charros de Temoaya. It was constructed between 1982 and 1996. The major event to take place here is the annual commemoration of the Day of the Charro on 14 September. In addition to charreada, the ring also hosts events such as lucha libre, boxing and political events

The town has bus service from Cuatro Caminos in Mexico City.

== Culture ==
The base of the culture here is the significant Otomi population. Many of these people can be identified, especially during festivals wearing traditional clothing, which for women is heavily embroidered.

The patron saint of the seat and municipality is Saint James, locally called Señor Santiago, whose feast day is 25 July. Traditional dances featuring locally designed sarapes are performed accompanied by drums and violins. The most common dance is called the Danza de Pastoras, related to the caring of livestock. Pre-Hispanic dance in costume, such as “santigueros” and “concheros” are also performed. On major holidays, charreadas are performed.

Another important commemoration for the Otomi population is the “moshte” which is related to the harvest. It is related to Day of the Dead. During this and other ethnic Otomi celebrations music such as Chimarecú, Naki ma Tosho, Njú and Rosa María are played, but this tradition is in danger of disappearing.

== Centro Ceremonial Otomí ==
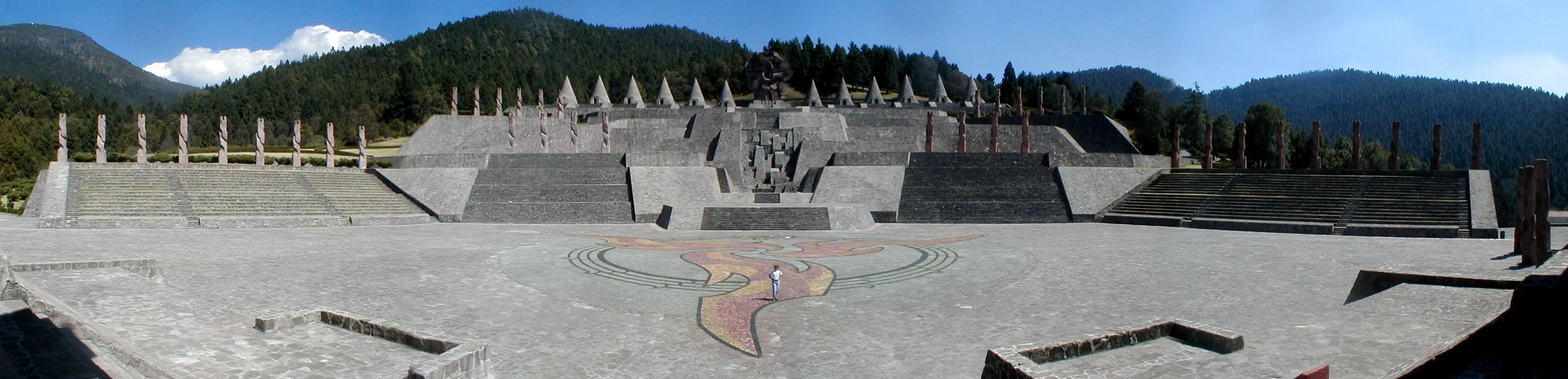
Panorama of the Otomi Ceremonial Center.

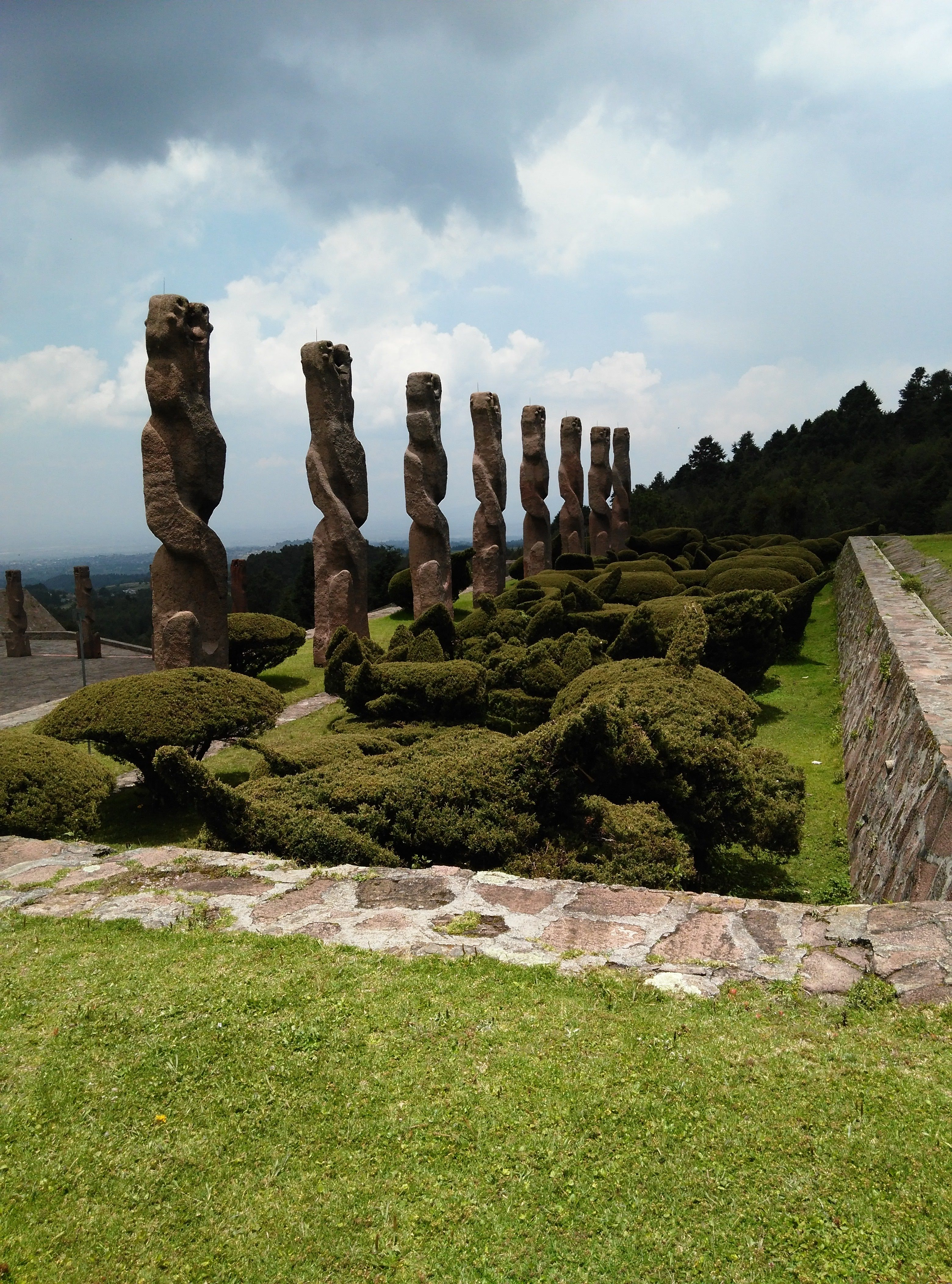
Statues at Otomi Ceremonial Center.

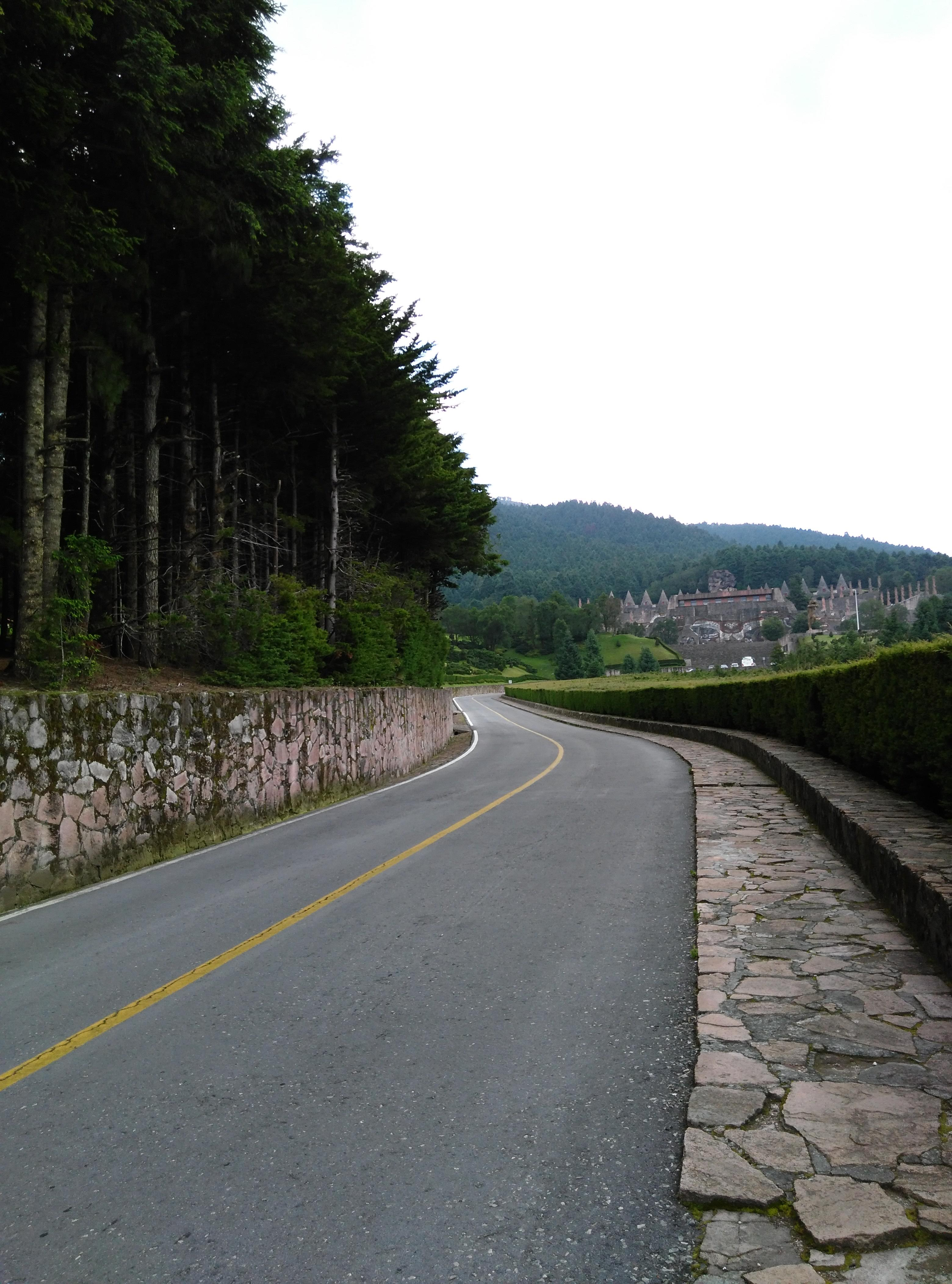
Road leading to Entrance to the Otomi Ceremonial Center (seen in the background).

Just outside the municipal seat is the Centro Ceremonial Otomí or Otomi Ceremonial Center. This center is the result of efforts to create a recognized space to preserve and promote the Otomi culture. These efforts were begun in 1977 on the part of Otomi elders and some local ejidos. The foundation was formally established in 1980 and construction of the monumental facility began in 1988.

The site and organization aims to recreate Otomi ceremonies of centuries past even though the written and archeological evidence as to what they were is scarce. On the second Sunday of each month, a ritual is performed there to honor the elements of earth, air, fire, and water, as well as to supplicate to the gods with offerings. This ritual is headed by the members of the Otomi Supreme Council.

The complex is constructed on a mountain called Cerro La Catedral. The entrance of the center has a sculpture of a warrior of the Botzanga Otomi who fought against the Aztec emperor Axayacatl. The first plaza is called the Plaza del Coloso (Plaza of the Colossus), and is named after a giant figure of Tahaay, the lord messenger of fire and life. At the back is a mural of Da-mishi, the jaguar that walks and talks done by Luis de Aragón.

Ascending the hill is the Glorieta del Centinela (Roundabout of the Sentinel) to which indications of the four cardinal directions meet. Next is the Plaza del Sagitario, the main one, which is surrounded by 45 enormous sculptures that act as guards. This plaza also features the Assembly Hall, with its seven columns. These total 52, the number of years on the Aztec calendar. This building houses the Otomi Supreme Council, and the seven columns are thought to be associated with the seven musical notes, the seven colors of the rainbow, and the seven days of the week.

At the most elevated spot are twelve silos or cones, each representing a generation of Otomis on which is a sculpture of Tata Jiade, the Sun. While the construction is meant to reflect Otomi culture before the 9th century CE and Nahua influence, this latter influence is acknowledged by an image of Quetzalcoatl.

The Otomi Ceremonial Center has a small teaching museum with a permanent exhibition of artifacts, history of the Otomi people, and past and present crafts. This museum is called the "Nguu Ro Ya Hnhnu" ("Museum of the Otomi Culture").

The complex is located on an ecological reserve called the Otomi-Mexico State Park. This park extends over 50 hectares (120 acres), most of which is covered in pine, oyamel, and holm oak forest. This part of the ceremonial center has camping and hiking facilities. The complex is notable for having appeared in the James Bond film Licence to Kill (1989), as well as a Sofi Tukker music video for "Swing".

== Rug making ==
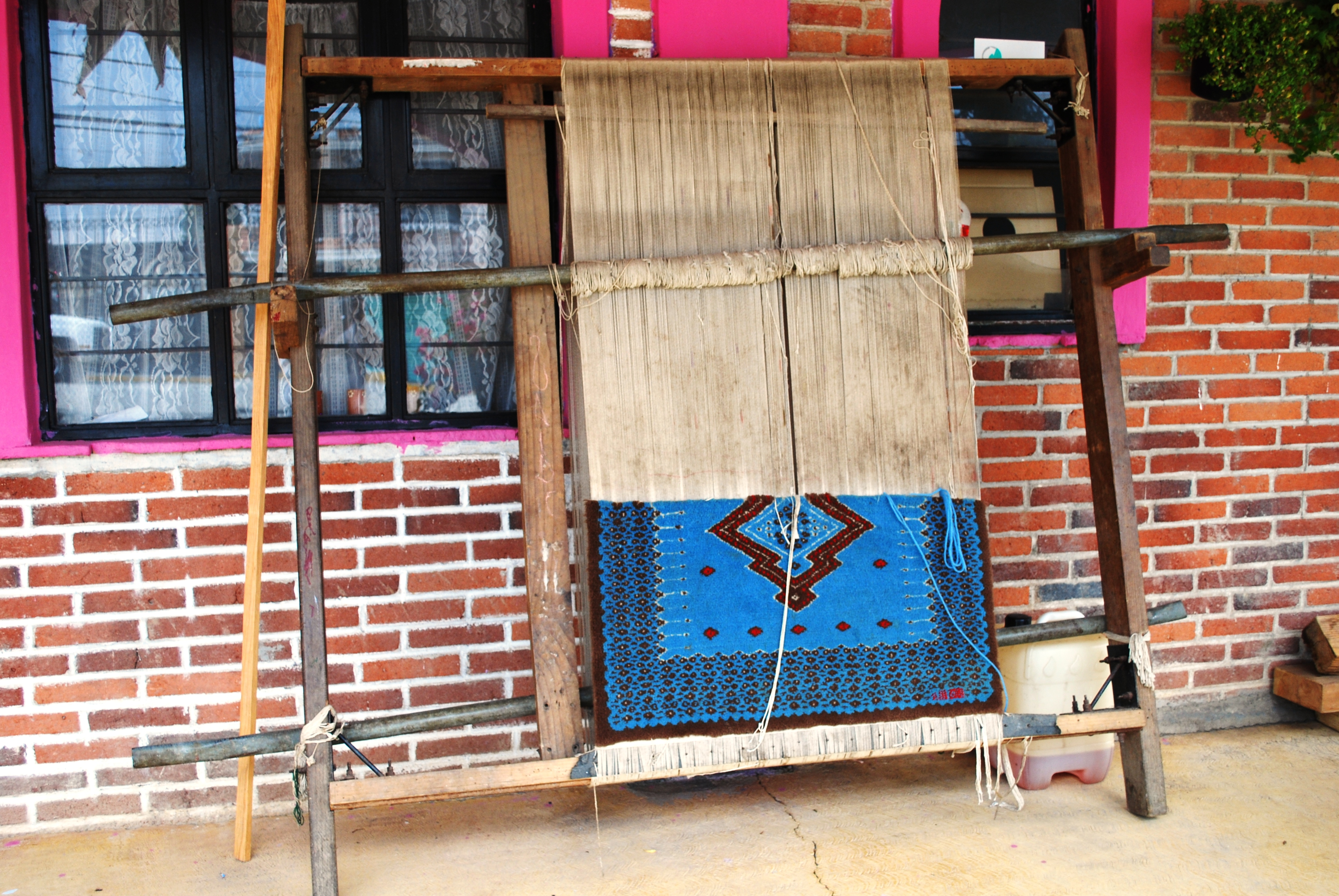
Rug display at the Centro Artesannal Tapetes Mexicanos

The municipality is also known for the making is Persian-style handknotted rugs. The making of these rugs was begun in 1968 with the aim of creating jobs in the region. It was initially sponsored by the Bank of Mexico; later the project was funded by the State of Mexico. This project was later abandoned due to poor management, but families here continued to make the rugs on their own. In 1999, a new organization, Sociedad Cooperativa de Tapetes Anudados a Mano Temoaya (http://tapetestemoaya.com/) took over but remained independent of the government. Although most rugs are made in a community called San Pedro Arriba (5 km from the seat), the cooperative's store, Centro Artesanal “Tapetes Mexicanos” is located in San Pedro Abajo.

While the techniques used are that of Oriental rugs, the designs used are indigenous to Mexico. Most are Otomi but designs from other cultures such as those from Chiapas, Nayarit and Guanajuato are also used. Common themes include birds, flowers, geometric figures, elements from natures, as well as magical and religious signs. Approximately one hundred colors are used in forty four basic designs which have 145 variations. The rugs are all hand knotted, mostly by women, using virgin wool which is brought into the municipality from other places. Each square meter takes about forty days to complete. The rugs are knotted on wooden frames which have been strung with heavy duty cotton string to serve as the base. Many of these rugs come with certificates of authenticity and a number have serial numbers worked into the edge of the design.

== The municipality ==
=== Geography and climate ===
The town of Temoaya is the governing authority for seventy eight other communities, which together cover an area of 199.63km2. Only about four percent (2987) of the municipal population of 77,714 lives in the town proper. The municipality borders the municipalities of Jiquipilco, Nicolás Romero, Toluca, Otzolotepec, Isidro Fabela, Jilotzingo, Ixtlahuaca and Almoloya de Juárez.

The municipality is relatively isolated due to the narrow road leading here from Toluca. The territory of the municipality is divided into parts. The western part is mountainous, part of the Sierra de Monte Alto. This range contains peaks such as the Cerro Gordo, Cerro Los Lobos, Xitoxi, Nepeni and other. The other is relatively flat. Surface water consists of small rivers such as the Miranda, Caballero and Temoaya, with the Lerma River forming one of the municipality's boundaries. Another source of water is fresh water springs such as El Capulín, Caballero, Santiago, Tres Ojuelos and Agua Blanca. There is one dam on the Lerma River in this municipality called the Alzate.

The climate is temperate and relatively humid with rains mostly in the summer. Average temperature is 13.4C, ranging between 9 and 35.5C. It is one of the coldest municipalities in the Toluca Valley due to its altitude. Frosts can occur between October and April and morning fog is not uncommon the rest of the year. In the higher elevations there are forest with pine, cedar, oyamel and other trees. In the lower areas there are some broadleaf trees but there are more areas with grass and shrub. Most of the flat areas are cultivated with both field crops and orchards. Very little wildlife remains due to the degradation of most of the ecosystem here. Some small mammals such as squirrels, rabbits and the like remain as well as some bird species. Aquatic life has completely disappeared from the Lerma River area.

=== Economy ===
The main economic activity of the municipality is agriculture, to which about 66% of the territory is dedicated. Eighty eight percent of the land is planted to corn. Other crops include fava beans, maguey, and some fruit trees. Livestock is raised as a complement to agriculture for domestic consumption. The most common animals are turkeys and sheep, especially among the Otomi. This employs about 26.5% of the population.

Industry is limited to the production of handcrafts. Some of the wares produced include cheeses, bread, tortillas, brooms, ironing boards, and various wood products. Textiles are prominent and include chincuetes, sarape, wraps, knitted items and embroidery. The main income producer is the making of Persian-style rugs for the national and international market. A cooperative named “Tapetes Mexicanos” consists of about 300 artisans with another 900 working independently. Another craft in the municipality is the making of large clay pots used for the making of mole This type of industry employs about twenty two percent of the population. The rest, 46% work in commerce and services. The trend overall in the municipality has been away from agriculture and towards commerce.

In some areas of the municipality, there are deposits of sand, gravel and other construction materials. The remaining forest areas still have logging timber but their harvest is heavily regulated. The municipality has 1,089.7 hectares of surface water with some fish farming practiced, mostly producing trout. The municipality has several attractions suitable for tourism such as fresh water springs.

=== Demographics ===
Temoaya has the highest population of indigenous people in the state of Mexico, with about 38% of the population speaking an indigenous language. The municipality is losing population, with many leaving to work in nearby Mexico City. However, most of these people keep their ties to their home municipality. Only about one percent of the municipality's residents were born somewhere else. Despite, its proximity to Mexico City and Toluca, the municipality is rural with only limited development.

=== Important sites outside the seat ===
The Finca La Venturosa farm was founded by the Colín Castelán family in the 1990s. They acquired the land in 1994, after visiting the area and seeing how ecologically deteriorated it was. They began to rehabilitate the forest area by planting 5,000 trees that first summer. Since then, they have reforested 12.5 of the 14.5 hectares of the farm. They have been working with neighbors to reforest another 21 hectares. This has been sufficient to draw back a number of wild species back to the area. In 1999, they began to build tourist facilities such as a restaurant and cabins as well as playgrounds and a football/basketball court. There are also campgrounds and patrolled hiking paths

The San José Buenavista Hacienda was founded in the 16th century mostly for agricultural purposes. Later it added activities such as cattle raising, and cheese and butter making. This was the site of the first primary school for girls in Temoaya. Today, it can be rented for events with its main house and chapel able to accommodate hundreds of people. Other haciendas and farms from the colonial era include Rancho de Cordero, and Rancho de Luna.

Xiquilpilco El Viejo (Old Juiquipilco) is an unexplored archeological zone with an ancient teocalli or sacred precinct located from the town of Temoaya. In the area, loose artifacts such as clay figures, arrowheads, pots and more can still be found. It is considered to be the “cradle” of the Otomi by people of the area. The municipality conserves a number of the buildings here as part of the municipality's heritage. The site has the remains of a Catholic church constructed in the 16th century and dedicated to Saint James.
