= Hugo de la Rosa García =

Mexican politician

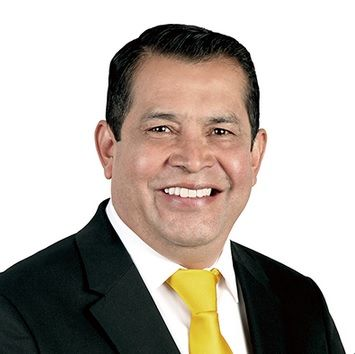
- Born: 2 April 1958 (age 68); Santiago Xiacui, Oaxaca, Mexico
- Occupation: Politician
- Political party: PRD, Morena

Juan Hugo de la Rosa García (born 2 April 1958) is a Mexican politician. He has been affiliated with both the Party of the Democratic Revolution (PRD) and the National Regeneration Movement (Morena).

In the 2006 general election he was elected to the Chamber of Deputies to represent the State of Mexico's 31st district (Ciudad Nezahualcóyotl) for the PRD. He returned to Congress in the 2024 general election on the Morena ticket for the State of Mexico's 17th district (Ecatepec de Morelos).

Between his stints in Congress, he served two terms (2016–2018 and 2019–2021) as municipal president of Ciudad Nezahualcóyotl for the PRD.
