= Ixtlahuaca de Rayón =

Ixtlahuaca (de Rayón)
- Town & Municipality
- Coat of arms
- Interactive map of Ixtlahuaca (de Rayón)
- Coordinates: 19°34′08″N 99°46′01″W
- Country: Mexico
- State: State of Mexico
- Municipal Status: 1816

Government
  - Municipal President: Enrique Galicia Hernandez (2025-2027)
- Elevation (of seat): 2,540 m (8,330 ft)

Population (2005) Municipality
  - Municipality: 126,505
  - Seat: 7,114
- Time zone: UTC-6 (Central)
- Postal code (of seat): 50740
- Website: (in Spanish) http://www.ixtlahuaca.gob.mx

Ixtlahuaca de Rayón (often just simply called "Ixtlahuaca", Otomi: Hiafi) is the municipal seat and 5th largest city in the municipality of Ixtlahuaca (not Ixtlahuaca del Rayón) north of Toluca in the northwest part of the State of Mexico, in Mexico. The distance between Mexico City and Ixtlahuaca is 32 km. The name Ixthahuaca comes from Náhuatl and means plains without trees. The city and municipality were officially established by decree on November 14, 1816 by the Congress of the State of Mexico.

== The town of Ixtlahuaca de Rayón ==
The city of Ixtlahuca de Rayón had a population of 7,114 at the 2005 census. When the town was officially established, the appendage of "de Rayón" was added to the name in honor of Francisco López Rayón who was executed there by royalist forces during the Mexican War of Independence on the side of the municipal palace. The original Mazahua town was located about 4 miles east of the current city. The population center was moved in 1545 when it was decided that the area needed a parish church of its own (it had been dependent on the parish of Tlalchichilpan prior), and the priest decided upon the location, finishing construction in 1552. Viceroy Luis de Velasco designated the area as a town. Ixtlahuaca gained city status in 1992.

== The municipality of Ixtlahuaca ==
The municipality of Ixtlahuaca is one of 125 municipalities in the State of Mexico. Its largest cities are San Bartolo del LLano, San Pedro Los Baños, Santo Domingo de Guzmán, Emiliano Zapata, and the city of Ixtlahuaca del Rayón.

As municipal seat, Ixtlahuaca de Rayón has governing jurisdiction over the following communities: Barrio de San Pedro, Barrio de San Pedro la Cabecera, Barrio de Santo Domingo Huereje, Barrio de Shira, Barrio de Trojes, Barrio San Joaquín la Cabecera, Colonia Cuauhtémoc, Colonia Francisco I. Madero, Colonia Guadalupe del Río, Colonia Isidro Fabela (La Lomita), Colonia Luis Donaldo Colosio, Colonia San Francisco de Asís, Colonia Vicente Guerrero, Dolores Enyege, Ejido 20 de Nov. la Concepción de los Baños, Ejido de Atotonilco, Ejido de Huereje, Ejido de la Concepción de los Baños, Ejido de la Concepción de los Baños Primero, Ejido de San Jerónimo Ixtlapantongo, Ejido la Purísima, Ejido San Lorenzo Toxico Manzana Octava, Ejido San Lorenzo Toxico Manzana Séptima, Ejido San Lorenzo Toxico Manzana Sexta, El Rincón de los Perales, Emiliano Zapata (Santo Domingo), Fraccionamiento Hacienda la Purísima, Guadalupe Cachi, Jalpa de Dolores, Jalpa de los Baños, La Concepción Enyege, La Concepción los Baños, La Guadalupana (El Sauco), Rancho San Francisco, Rancho San José Huereje, San Andrés del Pedregal, San Antonio Bonixi, San Antonio de los Remedios, San Bartolo del Llano, San Cristóbal los Baños, San Francisco de Guzmán, San Francisco del Río, San Francisco Ixtlahuaca, San Ignacio del Pedregal, San Ildefonso, San Isidro Boxipe, San Jerónimo Ixtapantongo, San Jerónimo la Cañada, San José del Río, San Juan de las Manzanas, San Lorenzo Toxico, San Mateo Ixtlahuaca, San Miguel el Alto (Ranchos Viejos) San Miguel Enyege, San Pablo de los Remedios, San Pedro los Baños, Santa Ana Ixtlahuaca (Sta. Ana Ixtlahuacingo), Santa Ana la Ladera, Santa María del Llano, and Santo Domingo de Guzmán.

It has an area of 336.49 km^{2}. The total population of the municipality is 126,505 as of 2005.

Ixtlahuaca borders municipalities of Jocotitlán, Jiquipilco, Temoaya, Almoloya de Juárez, San Felipe del Progreso and Villa Victoria.

The area was originally called J'apui, which comes from the Mazahua language, as a number of Mazahua tribes came to settle the land near the Xocotépetl volcano. Besides Mazahuas, it was also inhabited by Nahuas, Otomi, and Matlatzinca people. The area was conquered by Moctezuma II just before the arrival of the Spanish, and became the capital of a strategic province along the border with the Purepecha Empire. The Mazahuas, along with other tribes that inhabited the areas west and north of Tenochtitlan (now Mexico City) submitted to Spanish domination without a fight and their lands were distributed among Hernán Cortés's soldiers.
