= The Prom Kings =

Studio album by The Prom Kings
- Released: August 2, 2005
- Genres: Rock; post-grunge
- Length: 40:39
- Label: Three Kings DBC
- Producers: Andrew Duncan, Michael Carney

Singles from The Prom Kings
- 1. "Alone" Released: 2005

Professional ratings
Review scores
Source	Rating
Allmusic	1.5/5 stars

The Prom Kings were an American rock band based in Los Angeles, California that formed in 2001. The band released their self-titled debut album on August 2, 2005. Their first single, "Alone," started getting played on American rock radio stations in January 2005. The Prom Kings were signed with the independent record label Three Kings DBC. The record label's website has been taken down as of 2011. The Prom Kings released their second single, "Black Gold," on December 26, 2006. The band consisted of Fredrik Ramberg (guitar), Renato López (guitar), Henry Strauch (drums), Mauricio Jacome (bass), and Chris Carney (vocals).

AllMusic reviewed the band's first album by saying "They're no doubt rolling in a nondescript grey Chevy Malibu, because that's about how distinctive this album is..." citing the album's generic blandness.

Lead singer Chris Carney was later featured on the show twentyfourseven, which aired on MTV from December 2006 to February 2007. Carney died of injuries sustained in a traffic accident on December 4, 2015. He was 35 years old. Renato López was found dead of gunshot wounds in Santa María Mazatla, Mexico in November 2016. He was 33 years old.

== The Prom Kings track listing ==
All songs written by The Prom Kings and Michael Carney except where noted.

No.	Title	Length
1.	"Angels" (The Prom Kings, Michael Carney, Josh Baker)	3:49
2.	"Birthday" (The Prom Kings, Michael Carney, Andrew Duncan)	3:53
3.	"Fade" (The Prom Kings, Michael Carney, Andrew Duncan)	5:13
4.	"Better Man" (The Prom Kings, Michael Carney, Josh Baker)	3:41
5.	"Alone"	3:39
6.	"Lines" (The Prom Kings, Michael Carney, Josh Baker)	3:26
7.	"Down" (The Prom Kings, Michael Carney, Andrew Duncan, The Game)	3:36
8.	"Blow" (The Prom Kings, Michael Carney, Andrew Duncan)	5:14
9.	"Bleeding" (The Prom Kings, Michael Carney, Josh Baker)	4:17
10.	"The One" (The Prom Kings, Michael Carney, Andrew Duncan, David Cooper)	3:51
Total length:		40:39

== Chart performance ==
Album

Chart (2005)	Peak position
US Heatseekers Albums	30

Singles

Chart (2005)	Single	Peak position
US Billboard 200 Mainstream Rock Tracks	"Alone"	24

== Discography ==
The Prom Kings discography
- Studio albums: 1
- Singles: 2
- Music videos: 1

=== Studio albums ===
- The Prom Kings (2005, Three Kings DBC)

=== Singles ===
- Alone (2005)
- Black Gold (2006)

=== Music videos ===
Year	Title
2005	"Alone"

== Personnel ==
Performance and production credits are adapted from the album's liner notes.

The Prom Kings

- Joey Hullearn - guitars
- Mauricio Brandao - bass
- Luke Pickerill - drums
- Chris Carney - vocals

Production

- Produced by Andrew Duncan & Michael Carney at The Castle
- Engineered by Csaba Petocz & Aldo Ruggiero
- Assistant engineers: Seth Paulus, Curt Kroeger & Dave Fleming
- Programming by Andrew Duncan
- Strings arranged by David Campbell
- Mixed by Mike Plotnikoff at Royaltone Studios
- A&R - Michael Carney, Alex Cortez & Jared Levine
- Executive producer - Michael Carney, Andrew Duncan, & Zane Stoddard
- Management - Focus 3 Entertainment
- Layout - Greg Patterson
- Photography - Jeff Gros & TJ Bode

== Appearances ==
- The song "Birthday" was featured on the ESPN SportsCenter television program on July 4, 2005.
- The song "Blow" was featured in both the movie and on the official soundtrack for The Island in 2005, a commercial for the DVD release of the film Ghost Rider in 2007, and in both the movie and on the official soundtrack for TT3D: Closer to the Edge in 2011.
- The song "Down" was featured on the soundtrack of the EA Sports game Arena Football.
