= Ciudad Nicolás Romero =

City and municipality in State of Mexico, Mexico

Nicolás Romero
- City and municipality
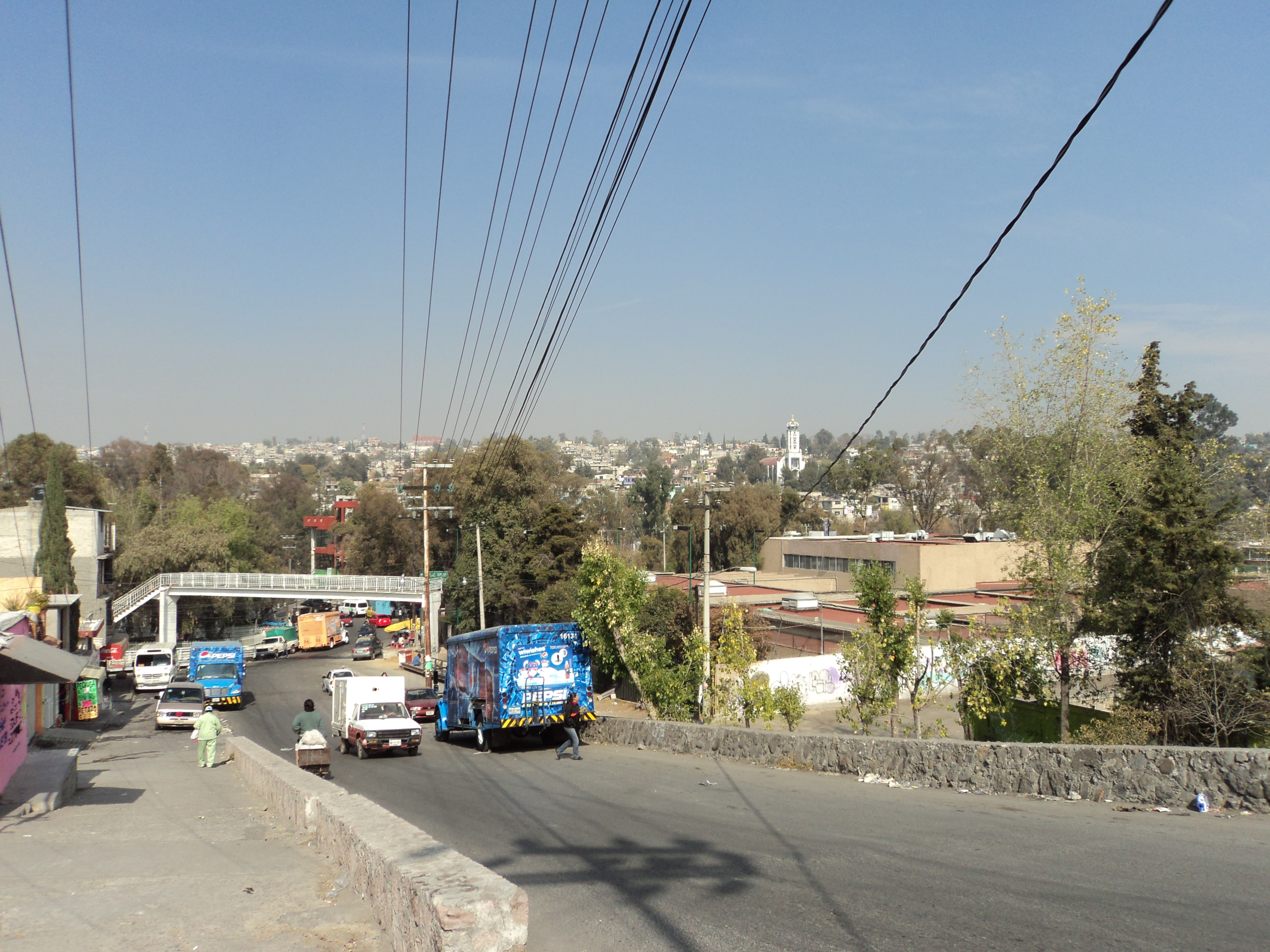
- San Ildefonso, Ciudad Nicolás Romero

- Location within Mexico
- Coordinates: 19°37′30″N 99°18′51″W
- Country: Mexico
- State: State of Mexico
- Region: Naucalpan
- Metro area: Greater Mexico City
- Municipal Status: June 29, 1820
- Municipal Seat: Villa Nicolás Romero

Government
  - Type: Ayuntamiento
  - Municipal President: Martín Sobreyra Peña (2013–2015)

Area
  - Land: 235.65 km^{2} (90.98 sq mi)
  - Water: 0.46 km^{2} (0.18 sq mi)
- Elevation (of seat): 2,390 m (7,840 ft)

Population (2010)
  - Municipality: 366,602
- Time zone: UTC-6 (CST)
- Postal code (of seat): 54400
- Area code: 55
- Demonym: Nicolásromerense
- Website: Official website (in Spanish)

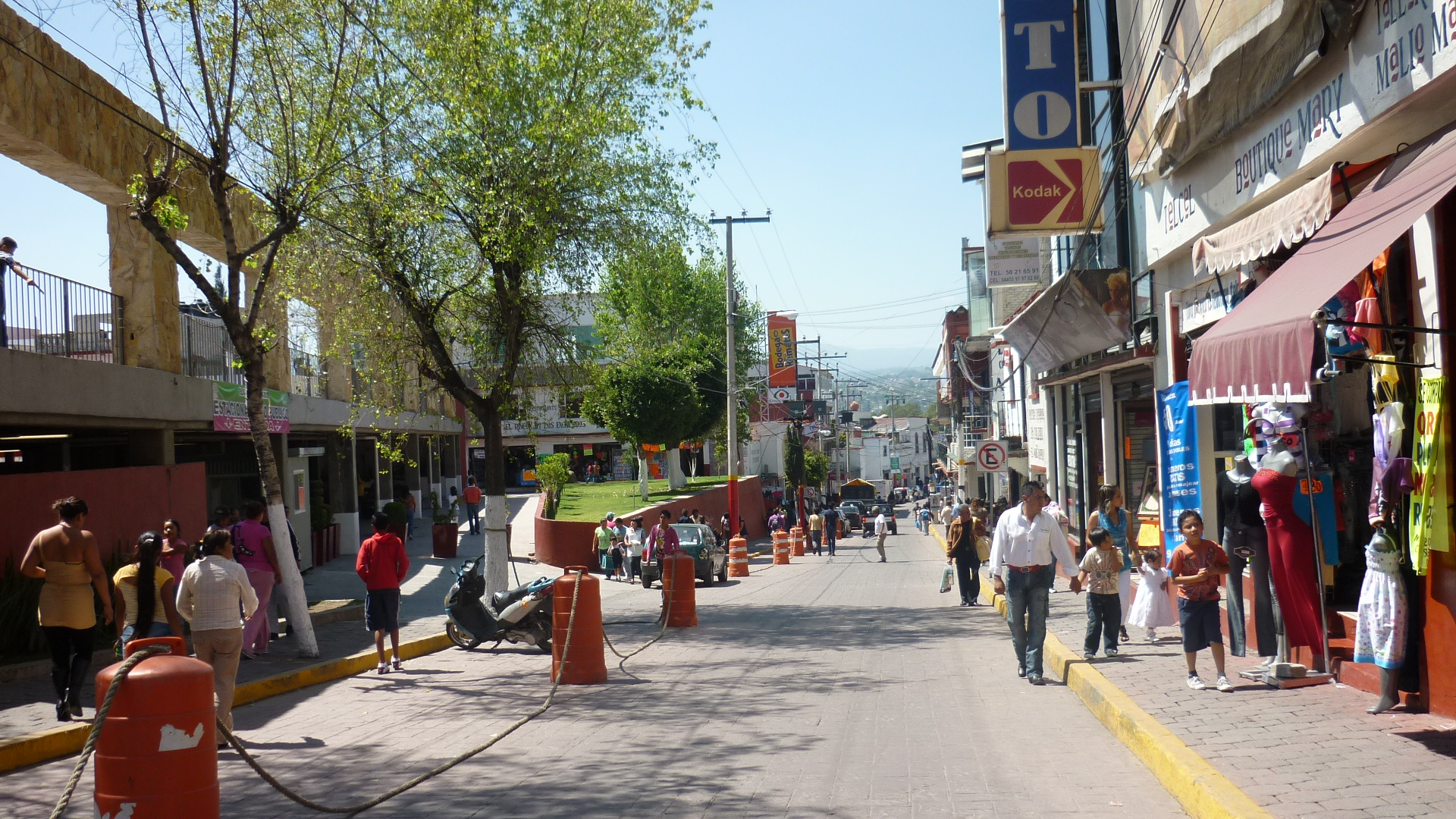
View of Ciudad Nicolás Romero.

Ciudad Nicolás Romero is the largest city and municipal seat of the municipality of Nicolás Romero in the State of Mexico, Mexico. It is located 58 km from the city of Toluca, the state capital and lies in the north-central part of the state, just northwest of the Federal District (Mexico City). The seat/municipality's current name is to honor Nicolás Romero, who fought for Benito Juárez during the Reform War and the French intervention in Mexico. He was executed there by the French. The town adopted this name in 1898. The area was settled by the Otomi and named Azcapotzaltongo ("among the ant hills" in Náhuatl) by the Aztecs after conquering it. During colonial times, it was known as San Pedro Azcapotzaltongo. It was then called Monte Bajo from 1821 to 1898, when the current name was adopted. Both the municipality and city are commonly referred to as Nicolás Romero.

== The city ==
Industrialization began here in the middle of the 19th century with factories like the “Molino Viejo” (now La Colmena), "Rio Grande" and "San Ildefonso" textile factories as well as the thread manufacturer Barrón, all of which are still in operation. This would continue through the 20th century with paper products and other types of production. In 1898, the seat was named "Villa Nicolás Romero", after achieving town status. In 1998 the town was elevated to city status and its current name is "Ciudad Nicolás Romero".

The city had a 2005 census population of 242,798 inhabitants, representing 79% of the municipality's population.

== The municipality ==
As municipal seat, Ciudad Nicolás Romero has governing jurisdiction over the following communities: Colonia 5 de Febrero, Colonia Buena Vista, Los Manantiales, El Puerto, Quinto Barrio (Ejido Cahuacán), Santa María Magdalena Cahuacán, Caja de Agua, Barron, Colonia Morelos, Progreso Industrial, Puerto Magú, San Francisco Magú, San José el Vidrio, San Juan de las Tablas, San Miguel Hila, Transfiguración, La Concepción (El Escobal), Ranchería los Duraznos, El Tanque, Paredeño (Rancho Paredeño), Loma del Río, Joya del Tejocote, Loma Larga, Colonia el Mirador, Puentecillas, Cahuacán, Ejido Magú, El Esclavo, Las Espinas, Miranda, Pueblo Nuevo, San José, Barrio de la Luz, Loma de Guadalupe (La Biznaga), Colonia Llano Grande (Nuevo Ejido), Veintidós de Febrero, Colonia los Tubos, Barrio de Guadalupe, Los Pilares, Loma de San José, Las Milpitas, La Cantera, La Estancia, San José los Barbechos (Los Barbechos), Colonia San Miguel, Ampliación el Rosario, and Loma de Chapultepec.

The municipality has a total area of 233.51 square km (90.16 sq mi) and a population of 350,000. It borders the municipalities of Villa del Carbón, Tepotzotlán, Atizapán de Zaragoza, Isidro Fabela, Cuautitlán Izcalli, Jiquipilco and Temoaya.

=== History ===
The area was occupied by the Otomi (who called themselves the "hñahñu"), who had been nomadic. The area the current municipality is located in became a tributary state of the Aztec Triple Alliance, in 1430, with the district's seat at Cahuacán subject to Tlacupan in what is now Tacuba. In the current municipality, four prehispanic towns still remain: Azcapotzaltongo, Cahuacán, Tlillan and Magú. After the Conquest, land here was redistributed among the conquering Spanish; however, starting in 1537 indigenous leaders began to struggle to regain the lost lands and water rights, a fight that has continued for over 400 years to the beginning of the ejido reform. In the cases of Ejido San Miguel Hila and Ejido Los Comuneros, the issues are still not resolved. In 1820, the municipality of Monte Bajo was created, which included what is now Nicolás Romero and parts of Atizapán de Zaragoza.
