= Josué Valdés Huezo =

Mexican politician

- Born: Josué Cirino Valdés Huezo; 22 March 1975 (age 51); State of Mexico, Mexico
- Occupation: Politician
- Political party: PRI

Josué Cirino Valdés Huezo (born 22 March 1975) is a Mexican politician from the Institutional Revolutionary Party (PRI). In the 2009 mid-terms he was elected to the Chamber of Deputies to represent the State of Mexico's 17th district during the 61st session of Congress.
