= Jocotitlán =

- Town and Municipality
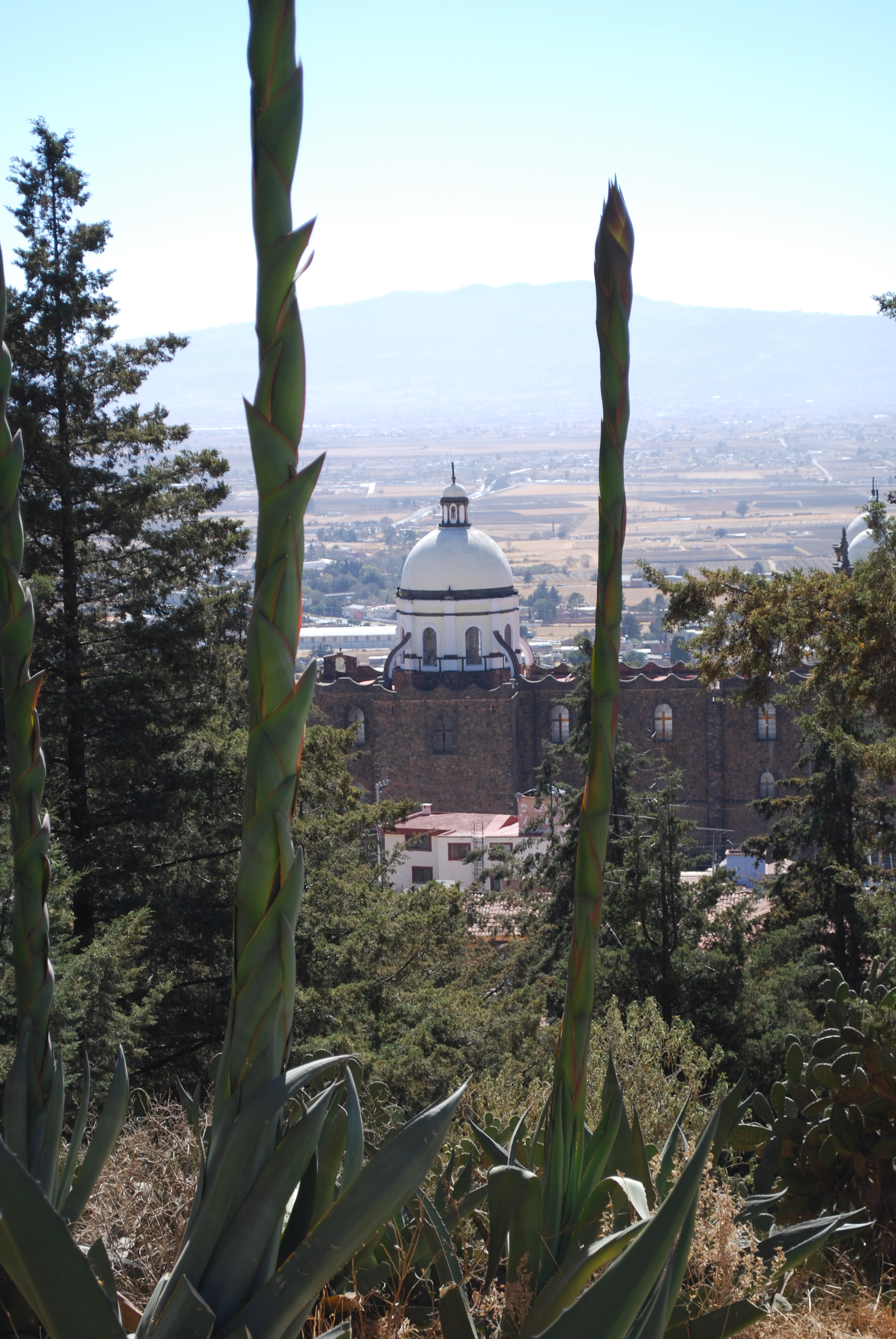
- Overlooking the church and municipality of Jocotitlán

- Location within Mexico
- Coordinates: 19°42′26″N 99°47′12″W
- Country: Mexico
- State: State of Mexico
- Founded: 1540
- Municipal Status: 1820

Government
  - Municipal President: C. José Jesús Cedillo Gonzalez
- Elevation (of seat): 2,650 m (8,690 ft)

Population (2005) Municipality
  - Municipality: 55,403
  - Seat: 7,457
- Time zone: UTC-6 (Central)
- Postal code (of seat): 50700
- Area code: 712
- Website: (in Spanish)

Jocotitlán is a municipality located in the northwestern part of the State of Mexico on the central highlands of the country of Mexico. The municipal seat is the town of Jocotitlán and is located at the foot of the Jocotitlán or Xocotépetl volcano, while most of the rest of the municipality is in the Ixtlahuaca Valley. The area has culturally been Mazahua since the pre-Hispanic period, with this indigenous group's traditions strongest in a number of smaller communities in the municipality. Jocotitlán is also home to the Pasteje Industrial Park, which was established in the 1960s, and began the industrialization of the economy. Today, about half of the municipality is employed in industry.

== The town ==
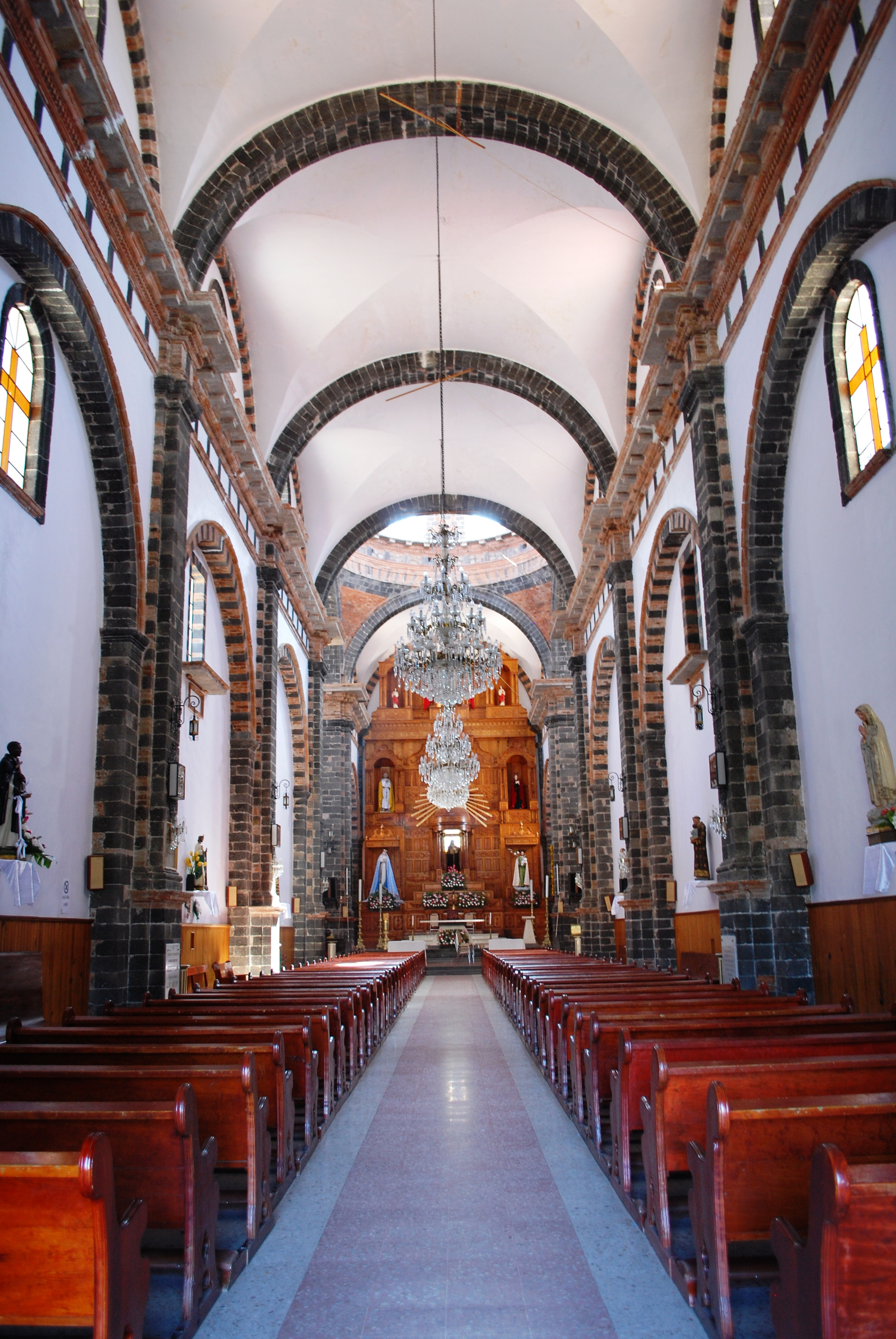
Nave of the Jesús Nazareno Church

The town of Jocotitlán is located at the foot of the Jocotitlán or Xocotepetl volcano in the northwest part of the State of Mexico, near the cities of Atlacomulco and Ixtlahuaca. It looks over a relatively flat area which is the Ixtlahuaca Valley. The center of this town has cobblestone streets and houses with red tile roofs. The social center of the community is the main plaza, with the parish church on the east side. The main plaza has two levels. The upper level contains a kiosk and a number of trees. Next to the plaza and the church, there is an enclosed rink for futbol rápido (fast soccer).

The parish church is named the Jesús Nazareno (Jesus the Nazarene) Church. The church was established in the 1575, and since then, it has had three phases of construction. The atrium cross is from the original 16th century construction, which was built by the Franciscans. The current building was begun in the 1860s, built in black sandstone with brick accents in Neoclassical style. However, the bell towers were not completed until 1983, over a century later. The interior has a single nave, and contains a monolithic baptismal font which is probably from the 16th century. On the south side of the church, there is a large chapel decorated in white and gold in Neoclassical style called the Santísimo.

Across the street from the main plaza on the south side, there is a commercial center called the "portales." One of the structures here serves as the cultural center for the community, called the Casa de Cultura Lic. Diego de Nájera Yanguas. It is named for a former parish priest who published a book in the Mazahua language. This cultural center offers classes in dance, painting, English and other subjects.

The municipal market is located a bit further south at the intersection of Jesus Cardozo and Rivapalacio Streets. The market mostly sells staple products for local consumption. It also contains food stands which sell local and regional specialties such as barbacoa, mole, quelites (a name for various types of edible greens), and dishes which contains local specialty ingredients such as wild mushrooms, escamoles, maguey flowers, ant eggs and "cupiches" (a kind of butterfly larvae).

== The municipality ==
As municipal seat, the town of Jocotitlán is the governing authority for about eighty other named communities, which together cover a territory of 276.77 km^{2}. This territory is also Jocotitlán. The municipality has a total population of over 26,000 people, but only about 3,600 live in the town proper. It borders the municipalities of Atlacomulco, Ixtlahuaca, Jiquipilco, San Bartolo Morelos, El Oro, Temascalcingo and San Felipe del Progreso. Only the town proper is considered to be urbanized, the rest of the territory is still relatively rural. This municipality is divided into three zones: the east centered on Santiago Yeche, the center centered on the town of Jocotitlán and the west centered on San Miguel Tenochtitlán. The city council is made up of a municipal president and representatives from the various communities of the municipality.

== History ==
The name Jocotitlán is from Nahuatl and means "among the sour fruit trees." The Aztec glyph for the municipal contains an image of the god Otonteuctli. It is not known if the Mazahuas worshipped the deity before Aztec domination, but this deity was recognized by neighboring Otomis and Tepanecs.

By the Classic period (200 to 600 CE), there were sedentary agricultural villages in the area, which had contact with Teotihuacan, and whose inhabitants spoke a language of the Oto-mazhaua family. However, Teotihuacan's influence in the area came late in the period, as the area was on the margin of the city's sphere. For the period of 600 to 900 CE, there is a lack of archeological evidence and ceramics do not show a great deal of sophistication. Jocotitlán was part of an area called Mazahuacan, or land of the Mazahua, and the town was originally a Mazahua settlement. This settlement, along with the rest of the area, was conquered by the Aztecs in 1478. It became the capital of a small tributary province, paid tribute in maguey mantas and food, and fought wars with Acámbaro.

After the Spanish subdued the area in 1520, lands were portioned out among the conquistadors as encomiendas. The area of Jocotitlán, then spelled Xocotitlán, along with Atlacomulco, was given to Francisco de Villegas. The Spanish town of Jocotitlán was officially established by royal decree in 1540. Diego Nájera was assigned as the area's priest in 1592, and by the time he died in 1635, was highly regarded by the Mazahuas. He learned both the culture and the language of the Mazahua people he served. Nájera wrote "La Doctrina y Enseñanza en la Lengua Mazahua" as a guide for priests to teach the Catholic faith in the Mazahua language. It was published in 1637. It is the only known book published in this language.

During the beginning of the Mexican War of Independence, Miguel Hidalgo y Costilla and his army passed through the municipality on his way to Mexico City. The parish priest of Jocotitlán, José Ignacio Muñiz y Acosta issued the formal edit excommunicating Hidalgo. The following year, in 1811, the town of Jocotitlán was attacked by royalist forces under Juan Bautista de la Torre, eliminating the nascent insurgency here and leaving much of the town destroyed. However, a number of residents would still participate in the insurgency during the war, mostly under Francisco López Rayón.

The adoption of the Cadiz Constitution in Spanish controlled lands was formally recognized in Jocotitlán on 7 July 1820. However, this constitution required the naming of municipal authorities although there was yet no municipality. This was rectified on 19 July, with the formation of an “ayuntamiento” or municipal council and the marking of territory which contained 1,000 people. The municipality was created by joining the haciendas of Tiacaque, Villeje, Pasteje, Nenanci and Caro. The towns and villages at that time were mostly communities of laborers on these haciendas. The first municipal president was C. Antonio del Valle. In 1823, some of its territory, called Tapaxco, was separated from the municipality. The State of Mexico ratified the establishment of the municipality in 1825.

In the 19th century, political sentiment in the municipality leaned towards centralized government (as opposed to a federalist system), opposing Liberal leaders such as Valentín Gómez Farías. During the Reform War, they adhered to the Plan of Tacubaya, and Liberal forces sacked the town in 1859. That same year, there was also an uprising of the Mazahua population as well. During the reign of Maximilian I, a number of individuals gained control of large areas of land in the municipality. In the latter part of the century, there was a push to provide education, telegraph and telephone to the area, along with a number of public works. At the end of the century, it was the fourth most populous municipality in its district and participated in the World's Fair in Chicago, exhibiting its cereals production, along with others from the State of Mexico.

No major battles of the Mexican Revolution occurred here, but a number of people who went to fight for the various rebel forces. However, the war caused widespread hunger in the area as the economy suffered. It also suffered epidemics and an earthquake in 1912. In 1913, a merchant and city official by the name of León Paniagua managed to get the town spared from an attack by a rebel group looking for sack the area. However, in 1915, a group of 200 Zapatistas attacked taking money and supplies.

After the war, the haciendas of the area were broken up and the land redistributed. The rest of the 20th century is dominated by economic change with the introduction of technology and industrialization as well as the urbanization of the municipal seat. From the 1930s to the 1960s, electricity was introduced, along with water pipes and the construction of schools. A theatre and library were also constructed.

In the 1960s, a company named IUSA bought much of the former hacienda of Pasteje, as part of a move of its operations away from Mexico City. The property was about five percent of the municipality's territory, but it had no water or electrical services. The company had to drill its own wells and negotiate with authorities to get connected to the grid. The workers of the area at that time had no experience working in industry. The company set wages lower than the national average, but also opened schools and training courses to workers. Workers at that time were forbidden to travel to Toluca or Mexico City, likely to prevent them from knowing how low their wages were. Despite, the initial difficulties, this was the beginning of the Pasteje Industrial Park, and the start of the industrialization of the area's economy. In the 1970s, the company established a school, which would eventually offer classes from high school/technical school level all the way to preschool for local area youth, with much of the cost of attending paid for by local industries. The growth of the industrial park became the main impetus for the area's population growth from then to the present.

In 1983, the village of Jocotitlán was officially declared to be a town, with several smaller communities in the municipality elevated to village status. Starting from the 1990 Census, the municipality ceased to be officially considered a rural farming area, and considered to be industrial. Today, both are still part of the municipality's economy. Infrastructure remains a problem as it lags behind need. The number of those with professional studies have increased due to the improvement of the area's educational system.

== Geography ==
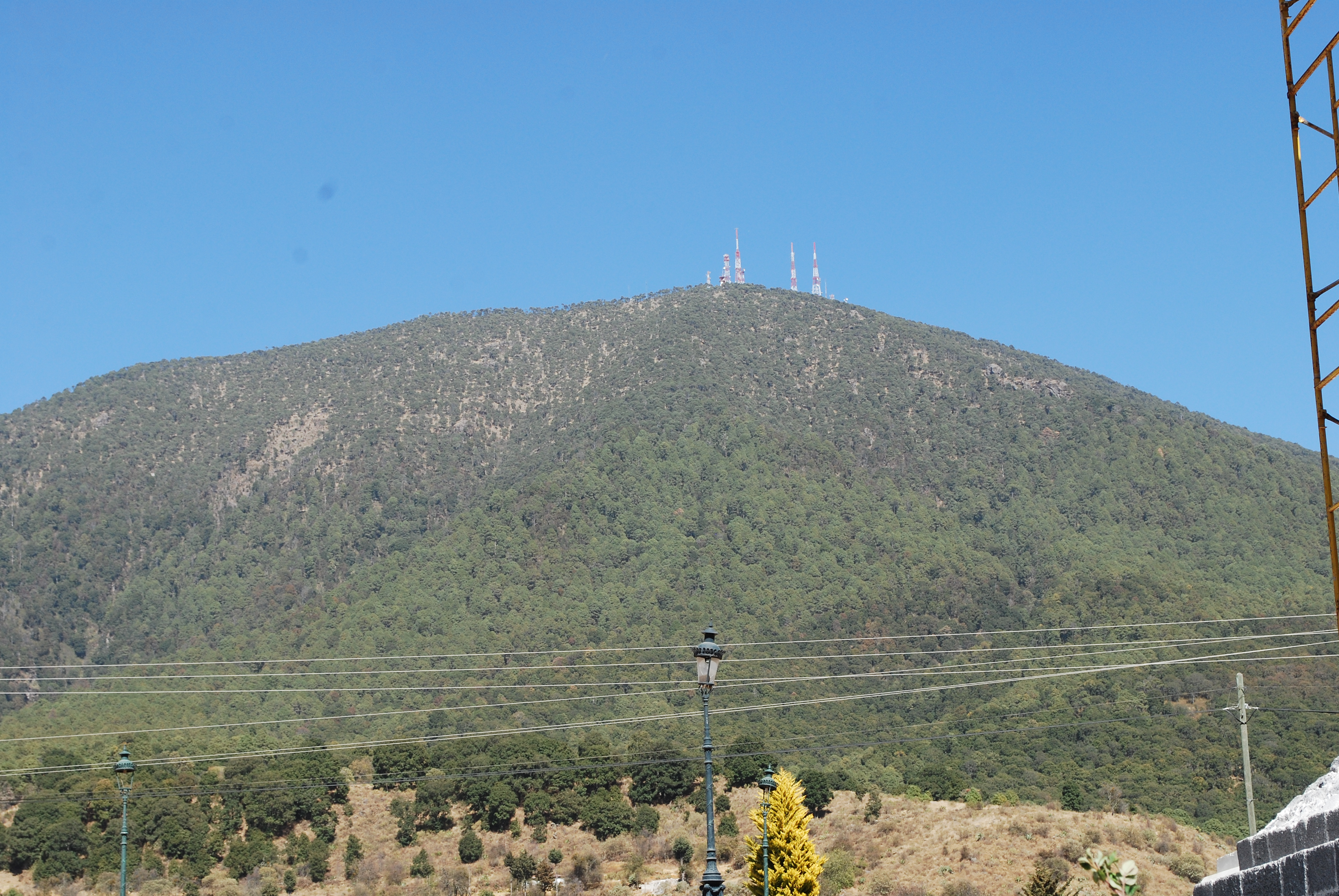
View of the Jocotitlán Volcano

The municipality is located between Ixtlahuaca and Atlacomulco, fifty four kilometers north of the state capital of Toluca. This area is in the northwest of the state, in the Ixtlahuaca Valley, which is formed by small mountain chains that belong to the Sierra Madre Occidental, with some formations as a result of being on the Trans-Mexican Volcanic Belt. Elevation varies from 2,530 masl next to the Lerma River on the far south to 2,900, on one side of the Jocotitlán volcano, with an average of 2,770. However, much of the land in the area is relatively flat and covers much of the Ixtlahuaca Valley. The municipal seat is on the side of the volcano, with the rest of the municipality on the valley floor. Other elevations include hills in San Miguel Tenochtitlán, and Santiago Casandeje.

The Jocotitlán volcano or Xocotépetl is an isolated volcano and is the tallest peak in the immediate area. It is inactive with an altitude of 3,928 meters above sea level at its peak, rising 1,300 meters above valley floor. The volcano developed during the Pleistocene of andesitic-to-dacitic lava flows. The most prominent feature of the volcano is a horseshoe-shaped escarpment open to the northeast that formed as a result of gravitational failure of the summit during the early Holocene. The resulting debris-avalanche deposit covers an eighty km^{2} area to the northeast, although much of soils all around contain volcanic residues. The last known eruption occurred about 700 years ago, but there is still a possibility of it reactivating and should be monitored. The volcano is part of an ecological reserve as part of the Isidro Fabela State Park. On the road that leads up the volcano, there is a statue of the Virgin Mary. This road leads to a lookout point at the top, which allows for a view of about forty km in all directions. Visible from the valley floor are the radio and television transmission towers that are at the top.

The rest of the municipality is basically flat, with a number of small ponds and lakes such as Santa Elena, San Clemente, Hierbabuena, La Soledad, El Toril, Los Árboles, San Jacinto, Cuendo, La Redonda, La Gorupa and Pasteje. There are also fresh water springs such as Las Fuentes, which supplies the municipal seat with its potable water. In areas without springs or ponds, there are wells, the largest of which is called Mavaro at the Lic. Andres Molina Enriquez Technical School.

=== Climate ===
The climate is classified as temperate and semi humid with rains in the summer. The average annual temperature is 13.2 °C, with high reaching about 31 °C and lows to 4 °C. There can be frosts in late December and early January with the occasional snow, especially on the volcano.

=== Flora and fauna ===
Tree species in the area include pine, oyamel, holm oak, cedar, eucalyptus and willow, but most trees are located on the volcano. The valley area is mostly farmland with some areas of grass, nopal cactus and other arid area plants. There are a large number of wild herbs, many of which are used for cooking and medicine. Most flowers in the area are cultivated. Wildlife includes rabbits, coyotes, bobcats, skunks, opossum, armadillos, squirrels, bats and foxes. Bodies of water often contains carp.

== Education ==
There are 119 schools in the municipality, which provide education from preschool to high school. However, the illiteracy rate is relatively high at 11.2%. There are libraries in the town of Jocotitlán, Los Reyes, Santa María Citendeje and San Miguel Tenochtitlán, as well as two reading rooms in Mavoro and San Francisco Cheje. There are two cultural centers, one in the municipal seat and another in San Miguel Tenochtitlan.

The Jocotitlán Technological Institute (Tecnológico de Estudios Superiores de Jocotitlán) was established in 1998 as a public institution for the north of Mexico State. Since its establishment, it has contributed to the economic development of the Atlacomulco region by allowing access to higher education in the sciences and technology. This has helped create a workforce to sustain and encourage development of industry in the area. The school began with two majors and seventy nine students. By 2015, it had nine majors and over 3,000 students from thirty one of the state's municipalities. These majors are electro-mechanical engineering, industrial engineering, computer systems engineering, mechatronics, architecture, accounting, business development, chemistry and materials engineering. The campus covers twenty hectares with several classroom buildings, an engineering method laboratory, a library, and various sporting facilities.

In addition to the various local public schools, IUSA and other industrial enterprises have established and sponsor a school for local youth from preschool to technical training above the high school level. These began as technical training programs when the industrial park was first established in the 1960s, which the included classes to get diplomas for primary and middle school levels. This training developed into a formal school for local children, even negotiating with the Secretariat of Public Education for a reduction of the number of years needed to graduate primary, secondary and technical schools, in order to meet the demands of the industry. Primary school could be done in four instead of six years, with eight-hour school days, and no vacation time. Much of the technical training has been provided by engineers brought in from Mexico City and Toluca. This school is known as the Escuela de Capacitación Técnica Industrial.

The Escuela de Bellas Artes (School of Fine Arts) was established in 1991 in the town by artists such as Jorge Monroy Martínez, Antonio Cardoso, Ignacio Cedillo Martínez and Ricardo Rocha. It offers classes in history, dance, theater, music and painting for both children and adults. It also offers a bachelor's in regional dance.

== Economy ==
The municipality belongs to Economic Region V of Atlacomulco. The level of economic marginalization in the municipality is considered to be low. Jocotitlán is within the megalopolis of Mexico City, which includes most of the State of Mexico. The metropolitan area has shifted industry away from the Federal District itself and the cities that border it into further outlying areas, as these areas have shifted from agriculture to industry and commerce. Jocotitlan is one of a number of areas which have industrialized as companies move out of the central core of the megalopolis. Much of what has made this possible is the lowering of the cost of transportation.

Today, about half of the municipality's employed population works in industry, with the rest divided between agriculture and commerce. The municipality has 26,000 hectares of cultivable land. Most of this is used for crops only during the rainy season, with only about 5,000 hectares irrigated. Principle crops include corn, wheat, barley, animal feed, peas, potatoes and beans. Crops are grown for both auto consumption and for sale. Livestock includes cows, pigs, sheep and domestic fowl. There are a few major livestock producers such as the Pasteje and Santiago Yeche ranches. There are 2,470 hectares of forest.

In 2003, a company called Bionatur Ivernaderos Biologicos established a greenhouse facility on 200 hectares in the Pasteje Industrial Park to grow tomatoes. It consists of 100 hectares of greenhouses and five plants to process and pack the tomatoes. The greenhouses produce sixty five kilograms of tomatoes per square meter, while conventional farming methods only produce five. The tomatoes are grown under very strict conditions watered by a drip system, all of which is monitored by computers. Since it opened, the enterprise has employed over 45,000 workers, with about half of the tomatoes exported. Industry is the major employer, with most of it concentrated at the Pasteje facility. It was established in the 1960s and by the 1990s there were about fifty industrial enterprises employing over 7,000 people. Industry generates 94.54% of new employment in the municipality. Before the 1980s, about seventy percent of the municipality's population was dedicated to agriculture. The major shift away from this occurred in the 1980s, because of the complex, but the trend continues. Eighty eight percent of workers who are not self-employed work in manufacturing. The industrial complex has been attracting migration to the area, mostly settling in the town of Jocotitlán and the community of Santiago Yeche.

The industrial park has its origins in the arrival of IUSA to the former Pasteje hacienda in the 1960s, and this company continues to be the most important enterprise. The park has succeeded because of its proximity to the cities of Toluca and Mexico City, as well as easy access to the Toluca-Atlacomulco highway. Most of the products produced in the industrial park are for export, with most going to the United States, Cuba, Nicaragua and Venezuela. Roughly 12,000 people work at the various enterprises of Pasteje, commuting from Atlacomulco, San Mateo Reyes, Concepción de los Baños, San Pedro de los Baños, Ixtlahuaca, Toluca and Santiago Yecha. Those who are unionized belong to an organization completely separate from the state level unions.

Near the complex, a shopping center called Plaza Mariana was built to sell merchandise to workers, and offer them credit, which could be deducted directly from their salaries. It also offers discounts to those working at certain enterprises such as IUSA.

Other enterprises in the municipality are limited. The percentage of people employed in commerce has grown in response to the growth in population. The municipality has a number of minor tourist attractions such as the Xocotepetl Volcano, the colonial look of the town center, and the Jesus Nazareno church which its important atrium cross. Mining is limited to building stone such as tezontle. San Juan Coajomulco, San Miguel Tenochtitlán y Santiago Casandejé are known for their pottery. In Jocotitlan and Mavaró, there are knit items, with woolen textiles found in Coajomulco, Casandeje, Citendeje, San Miguel Tenochtitlán and Mavoro, especially blankets, wraps and huipils.

== Demographics ==
Its population has grown from 19,920 in 1960 to 55,403 in 2005; however its growth rate is 0.25%, about half of that of the State of Mexico. The area is still identified as being Mazahua, although in 2005, there were 1,408 who spoke an indigenous language, down from 1735 in 1995. Mazahua traditions are strongest in the communities of Santiago Casandeje, Citendeje, Coajomulco, San Miguel Tenochtitlán and Concepción Caro, which are known for their traditional music, wool textiles and ceramics.

The overwhelming majority of the population is Catholic, with a small Evangelical community in San Miguel Tenochtitlán. Many of the religious traditions are a fusion of Catholic and Mazahua rituals. Aside from the parish in the municipal seat, other important churches include those in Santiago Yeche (built in the 17th century), San Miguel Tenochtitlán, San María Citendeje, Santiago Casandeje, Santa María Endare and San Francisco Cheje. The most important religious events are during Holy Week. In Santiago Yeche, Endare, Los Reyes and San Miguel Tenochtitlán the Passion is recreated with live actors. In the town of Jocotitlán, they use images from the 17th and 18th centuries. The Procession of Silence takes place on Maundy Thursday, during which around 5,000 men walk in the center of the town with a candle in hand in silence.

== Tiacaque ==
The Parque Ecológico Tiacaque (Tiacaque Ecological Park) is a recreational park and reserve established on what was the Tiacaque Hacienda. Since 2002, the operation of the park has been in the hands of a local Mazahua community, most of which lives in the nearby village of San Félix. The park extends over twenty seven hectares and is centered on a lake called San Félix, which was created by a dam. The lake contains carp and a fish called "charal". It also has a facility for raising trout. Surrounding the lake, there is a small forest with ash, holm oak and tejocote trees, along with a number of fresh water springs and a water fall. Wildlife seen at the park includes rabbits, squirrels and armadillos. Activities include boating, hiking and fishing. There are also three cabins for rent and a camping area. The constructions on this land are made of adobe and other rustic materials and include a restaurant, which specializes in trout. The project benefits about eighty indigenous families, and it overseen by a committee from the community.

== Transportation ==
Bus service is available from Atlacomulco and Ixtlahuaca for about 12 pesos. One can get to Ixtlahuaca from Toluca either from the terminal or at the corner of Alfredo del Mazo and Lopez Portillo for 22 pesos currently. There is also an abundance of taxis colectivos (shared taxis) operating from Ixtlahuaca and Atlacomulco for about the same price.
