= Jocotitlán (volcano) =

Volcano in Mexico

- Xocotépetl
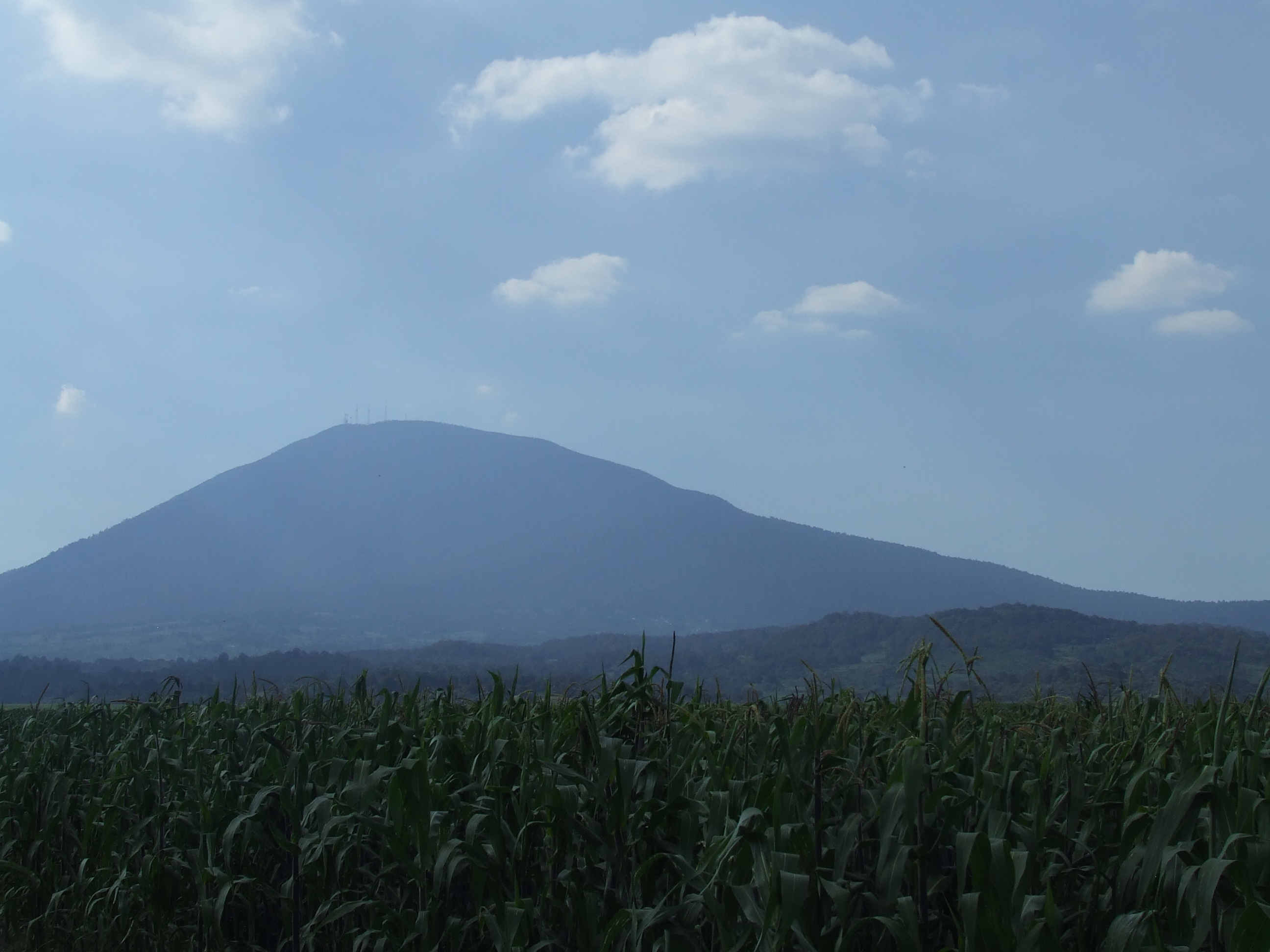

Highest point
- Elevation: 3,910 m (12,830 ft)
- Prominence: 1,200 m (3,900 ft)
- Listing: Mexico highest major peaks 12th
- Coordinates: 19°44′17″N 99°45′32″W

Geography
- Location within Mexico
- Location: State of Mexico, Mexico

Geology
- Mountain type: stratovolcano
- Volcanic belt: Trans-Mexican Volcanic Belt
- Last eruption: 1180 AD ± 100 years

Climbing
- Easiest route: hiking trail

Jocotitlán, also known as Xocotépetl (from Nahuatl languages Xocotepētl 'mountain of the sweet and sour fruits'), is a volcano in the Jocotitlán and Atlacomulco municipalities, in the State of Mexico. At 3,910 metres (12,828 ft) above sea level, its summit is the 12th highest peak of Mexico. (Note: As per convention, a summit is considered a peak with at least 500 meters of topographic prominence. Other peaks in Mexico lie higher, but are not prominent enough. For example, mount Tlachichihuatzi has an altitude of 4111 m, but a prominence of only 41 m.)

Jocotitlán volcano lies in the northern part of the Toluca Valley. It is part of the Eje Neovolcánico, a volcanic belt that traverses south-central Mexico. It is a stratovolcano formed by tephra and solidified lava flows. The volcano lies within the Isidro Fabela state park, (Note: Isidro Fabela (1882-1964) was a writer and politician native to the region.) a protected area of 3701 ha established in 1975.

Jocotitlán was considered holy by the Mazahua and Otomi peoples. The former called it Nguemore ("sacred mountain"), while the latter called it Gumidi ("he who sits facing straight forward"). In Pre-Columbian Mexico, the volcano held a sanctuary for Otontecuhtli, the Otomi king of the gods, also known to the Nahua people as fire god Xiuhtecuhtli. The volcano has also held a Catholic chapel since the 1980s. At 3,670 metres (12,041 ft), it is probably one of the highest chapels in Mexico.

Jocotitlán is a potentially active volcano, having erupted at least twice in the last 10,000 years. A series of cinder cones lying just north of the Jocotitlán volcano shows how intense the volcanic activity in the region is. If it erupts, the volcano could pose a serious threat to Greater Toluca and even Greater Mexico City.

The volcano can be easily climbed from the town of Jocotitlán. A winding 19 km country lane leads up to the microwave antenna located near the summit.
