= Hugo Eduardo Martínez Padilla =

Mexican politician

- Born: 19 May 1971 (age 55); State of Mexico, Mexico
- Occupation: Politician
- Political party: PRD

Hugo Eduardo Martínez Padilla (born 19 May 1971) is a Mexican politician affiliated with the Party of the Democratic Revolution (PRD).

In the 2006 general election he was elected to the Chamber of Deputies to represent the State of Mexico's 17th district during the 60th session of Congress.
