= Jiquipilco =

Town & Municipality in State of Mexico, Mexico

Jiquipilco Municipality
- Municipality
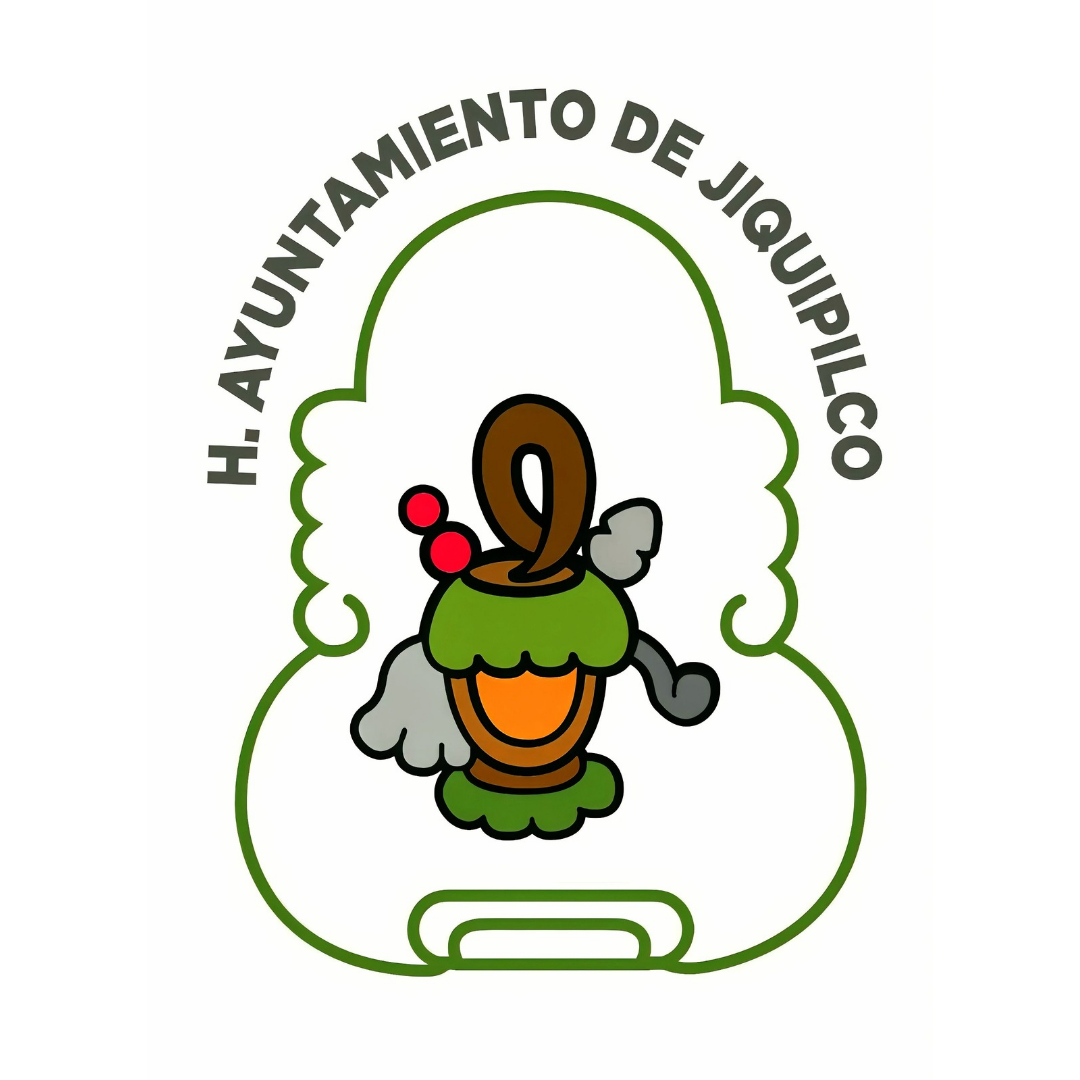
- Coat of arms

- Location within Mexico
- Coordinates: 19°33′26″N 99°36′27″W
- Country: Mexico
- State: State of Mexico
- Founded: 1593
- Municipal Status: 1824

Government
  - Municipal President: Antonio Escobar Félix (2024-2027)
- Elevation (of seat): 2,657 m (8,717 ft)

Population (2005) Municipality
  - Municipality: 59,969
  - Seat: 1,880
- Time zone: UTC-6 (Central)
- Postal code (of seat): 50800
- Website: (in Spanish) http://www.jiquipilco.gob.mx/wb2

Jiquipilco Municipality is one of the municipalities of the State of Mexico in Mexico. It is north of the Toluca Valley, part of the region consisting of the southern and western slopes of Cerro La Catedral, which has a concentration of speakers of the Otomi language. It is about 40 km from Toluca, the state capital. The name is a corruption of the Nahuatl "Xiquipilco", meaning "in the saddlebags". Jiquipilco is situated on the transversal volcanic axis that crosses Mexico in an area surrounded by lakes and volcanoes. This portion is called "Anahuac".

== Municipal seat ==
The town had a population of 1,880 as of the 2005 INEGI census. It lies at an elevation of 2,657 meters above sea level.

=== History ===
1274 BC. The first Otomi settlements are established in Jiquipilco.

1442 AD. Battle of Jiquipilco against the Tarascans on March 20.

1450. On March 8, Tlilcuetzpallin (in Nahuatl) or Botzanga (in Otomi), "Black Lizard," the ruler of Xiquipilco, is born.

1477-1479. Mexica troops under Axayácatl subdue Xiquipilco, Xocotitlán, and Atlacomulco. Tlilcuetzpallin is captured and taken to Tenochtitlán by Mexica troops, where he is later sacrificed.

1593. On March 6, the town of San Juan de las Huertas is founded, which will later become the municipal seat under the name of San Juan Jiquipilco.

1810. Miguel Hidalgo y Costilla spends the night at the La Dolorosa Hacienda (formerly the Nixiní Hacienda) in the community of San Antonio Nixiní on November 4.

1822. The Municipality of Jiquipilco is established by decree of Agustín de Iturbide as an entity dependent on the Mexican Empire on September 27.

1828. Bartolomé Navarrete Ballesteros, a reformer of the telegraph and lightning rod, is born on April 28.

1853. A group of people from Jiquipilco join the troops of General Juan Álvarez Hurtado.

1865. A contingent of 241 soldiers from the municipality of Jiquipilco departs to fight the French troops.

1894. The first smallpox vaccination campaign is carried out in Jiquipilco.

1914. A group of Zapatistas passed through Hacienda Santa Isabel (formerly Hacienda Santa Isabel) in the community of Santa Isabel, where they stole oxen.

1929. A clock of German origin was installed in the parish church of San Juan Bautista.

1953. The first deep well was drilled by the Department of the Federal District.

1963. On June 1, the governor began talks with the residents of Jiquipilco and Temoaya to connect the two municipalities. This resulted in the construction of the Jiquipilco-Temoaya highway, helping to ease the resentment between the two towns that had existed since their separation.

1975. Paving began on the toll-free State Highway MEX 3, better known as the Ixtlahuaca-Jiquipilco-Naucalpan highway.

1979. The Fiesta of the Lord of Jiquipilco was inaugurated.

1985. The September 19th earthquake damaged numerous religious temples and educational centers, causing cracks in their structures.

1996. Sonia Becerril Quijada became the first female mayor of Jiquipilco.

1996. The Mexican Postal Service and Telecomm-Telegraph office (now the Financial Institution for Well-being) was inaugurated next to the municipal palace and the "Sor Juana Inés de la Cruz" House of Culture, which now houses the Tlilcuetzpallin Museum and a theater named after Mayor Sonia Becerril Quijada.

2000. On May 11, the municipality received its first-ever visit from a Mexican president, Ernesto Zedillo Ponce de León, accompanied by then-Governor Arturo Montiel Rojas. They visited the Ejido Loma de Malacota community.

=== Notable sites ===
In addition to the town chapel, other attractions are the sanctuary of Santa Cruz Tepexpán, which dates from the 16th and 18th centuries, and the chapel of San Felipe Santiago, constructed around the end of the 16th century. A number of colonial era buildings have been preserved such as the ex–haciendas of Mañí, Nixiní, Santa Isabel, Boximo, some of whose structures are in ruins.

== Localities ==
As municipal seat, the town of Jiquipilco has governing jurisdiction over the following communities: Barrio Primero Buenos Aires, Bóximo, Buenavista, Buenos Aires, Colonia Benito Juárez, San Felipe Santiago, Colonia Flores Magón, Colonia la Purísima, Colonia Morelos, Dolores Amarillas, Ejido de Mañi, Ejido de Moxteje, Ejido de Santa María Nativitas, Ejido de Santa María Nativitas el Colector, Ejido Llano Grande (Planta Piloto), El Jaral (Tierra Montón), El Rincón Loma de Hidalgo, El Santuario del Señor del Cerrito, Hacienda Nixini Jiquipilco, La Nopalera, La Pastora, Las Golondrinas, Las Palomitas (Puerto Jiquipilli), Loma de Endotzi (Manzana Sexta), Loma de Hidalgo, Loma de San Felipe, Loma de San Pedro, Loma del Astillero, Loma del Madroño, Loma del Sitio, Loma Hermosa, Loma Hidalgo Colonia Benito Juárez, Loma Hidalgo Manzana Cuarta, Loma Vicente Guerrero, Los Ortiz, Manzana Cuarta, Manzana Cuarta de Santa Cruz Tepexpan, Manzana Primera la Capilla, Manzana Primera Parte Alta, Manzana Quinta (La Cañada), Manzana Quinta de San Bartolo Oxtotitlán, Manzana Segunda, Manzana Segunda de Santa Cruz Tepexpan, Manzana Sexta Parte Alta, Manzana Sexta Parte Baja, Manzana Sexta Parte Centro, Manzana Tercera (Bodo), Manzana Tercera de Santa Cruz Tepexpan, Manzana Tercera Juashi, Manzana Tercera Loma de Hidalgo, Manzana Tercera Panthé, Manzana Tercera Parte Baja, Moxteje, Palo Gacho, Pie del Cerro, Portezuelo, Primera Manzana de Santa Cruz Tepexpan, Ranchería de Mañi (Ex-hacienda de Mañi), Ranchería de Sila (Ejido de Sila), Rancho Alegre, Rancho Colorado, Rancho Loma de Malacota, Rancho los Quiroz, Rancho Santa Lucía, San Antonio Nixini, San Bartolo Oxtotitlán, San Felipe Santiago, San Francisco el Alto, San Isidro, San José del Sitio, San Martín Morelos, San Miguel Yuxtepec, Santa Isabel, Santa María Nativitas, Sección del Cerrito, and Tierra Blanca.

The municipality of Jiquipilco was founded in 1822 and has a total extension of 276.5 square km. It borders the following municipalities; San Bartolo Morelos, Villa del Carbón, Ciudad Nicholás Romero, Temoaya, Ixtlahuaca, and Jocotitlán. The population is 59,969.

A significant number of people leave the town every year in search of employment, mainly young people under 30. Many of them go to Mexico City or Toluca.

Modern Jiquipilco was founded on March 6, 1593.

The economy of Jiquipilco is based on agriculture and stockbreeding. The principal crops are wheat, barley and oats. Because of the difficult local topography, people continue to apply old techniques, and few farmers use mechanized equipment. Livestock is mainly represented by cattle, sheep, pigs and goats. The municipality also has abundant minerals, mostly nonmetallic, such as silica sand and gravel, and stone, obsidian and quartz, which find use in used mostly in construction and road paving.

=== History ===
The Otomis first came to this area around 1274. According to legend, they settled here coming from a land called "Xicomostoc", where seven tribes of Otomis came from to settle in places like Jilotepec, Acxotlán, Tepexí as well as the highlands of Jiquipilco, here leading a hunting and gathering existence. The Purépecha fought here with the Otomis as they tried to conquer Matlatzinca lands. In 1478, the Aztecs invaded Matlatzinca lands, and the Aztec prince Azayácatzin personally battled the Otomi prince Tlilcuetepalin (the Black Lizard) who won the fight, thereby saving Xiquipilco.

After the Spaniards subjugated Toluca, Gonzalo de Sandoval, known as the right arm of Hernán Cortés, promised to bring Jiquipilco under Spanish dominion in 15 days; however, he found an area populated by men who preferred to die on the battlefield. The Spanish eventually did succeed in bringing Jiquipilco into the dominion of New Spain.
