= Jilotzingo =

Coordinates: 19°24′N 99°14′W

- Municipality
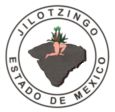
- Coat of arms

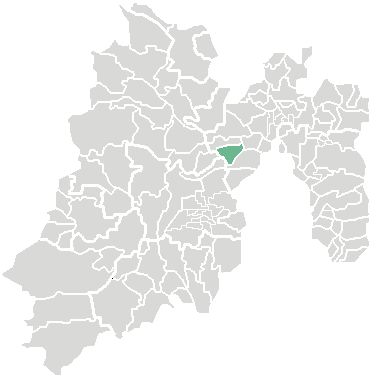
- Location of the municipality in Mexico State
- Country: Mexico
- State: Mexico (state)

Area
  - Total: 143.66 km^{2} (55.47 sq mi)

Population (2005)
  - Total: 13,825
- Time zone: UTC-6 (Central Standard Time)

Jilotzingo is one of 125 municipalities in the State of Mexico in Mexico. The municipal seat is the town of Santa Ana Jilotzingo, which is the 4th largest town in the municipality. The municipality covers an area of 143.66 km^{2}.

As of 2005, the municipality had a total population of 13,825.

In 2016, the mayor Juan Antonio Mayen Saucedo was murdered and the body of TV presenter Renato López was found.
